= List of highways numbered 25 Business =

Route 25 Business or Highway 25 Business may refer to:

- Interstate 25 Business
- U.S. Route 25 Business
- Arkansas Highway 25B
- Maine State Route 25 Business
- Mississippi Highway 25 Business
- New York State Route 25A Business (former)

== See also ==
- List of highways numbered 25
- List of highways numbered 25A
- List of highways numbered 25AD
- List of highways numbered 25B
- List of highways numbered 25C
- List of highways numbered 25T
