= New York State Route 73 =

State highway in Essex County, New York, US

New York State Route 73
- NY 73 highlighted in red, and Reference Route 913Q in blue

Route information
- Maintained by NYSDOT
- Length: 27.55 mi (44.34 km)
- Existed: 1930–present

Major junctions
- East end: US 9 in Elizabethtown
- NY 9N in Keene
- West end: NY 86 in Lake Placid

Location
- Country: United States
- State: New York
- Counties: Essex

Highway system
- New York Highways; Interstate; US; State; Reference; Parkways
← NY 72	→ NY 74
← NY 86	NY 86A	→ I-87

New York State Route 73 (NY 73) is a 27.55-mile-long (44.34 km) state highway located entirely within Essex County, New York, in the United States. The highway begins at an intersection with NY 86 in the village of Lake Placid and ends at a junction with U.S. Route 9 (US 9) north of the hamlet of Underwood in the extreme southwestern corner of the town of Elizabethtown. NY 73 meanders through a mountainous region of Adirondack Park and passes by several named peaks, including Porter Mountain and Lower Wolfjaw Mountain. Along the way, the route has a short concurrency with NY 9N in the town of Keene.

In the early 19th century, Lake Placid and Keene were connected by the North West Bay Road, an east–west highway linking Hopkinton to Westport. The highway was initially a crude, impassable road; however, it was significantly improved by the state of New York in the mid-1810s. A highway linking Keene to Underwood was constructed by 1846; at Underwood, the road connected to a stagecoach road that went from Albany to the Canada–US border. The latter road became the basis for most of modern US 9.

NY 73 was assigned as part of the 1930 renumbering of state highways in New York from NY 28N in Tahawus to NY 22 in Ticonderoga. The portion of the route from Tahawus to North Hudson followed the Blue Ridge Road; from North Hudson to Schroon, NY 73 overlapped US 9. At the time, modern NY 73 was designated as New York State Route 86A from Lake Placid to Keene. By the following year, the remainder of current NY 73 had become New York State Route 427. NY 73 was cut back to Schroon c. 1936 while NY 427 was replaced by an extended NY 86A c. 1938. In 1952, NY 73 was extended northward to Lake Placid, supplanting NY 86A. The eastern terminus of NY 73 was moved to the vicinity of Underwood on July 1, 1972, and the former routing of NY 73 from Schroon to Ticonderoga became NY 74.

== Route description ==
NY 73 begins at a traffic light along NY 86 near the eastern end of the village of Lake Placid in the town of North Elba. The highway heads towards the southwest, passing homes as Sentinel Road. At the intersection with Mill Pond Road, NY 73 passes a small pond, crossing over an associated creek. For that short time, the highway takes on a more southerly direction, mainly to the southeast. The surroundings of the highway remain the same as NY 73 leaves Lake Placid via Cascade Road.

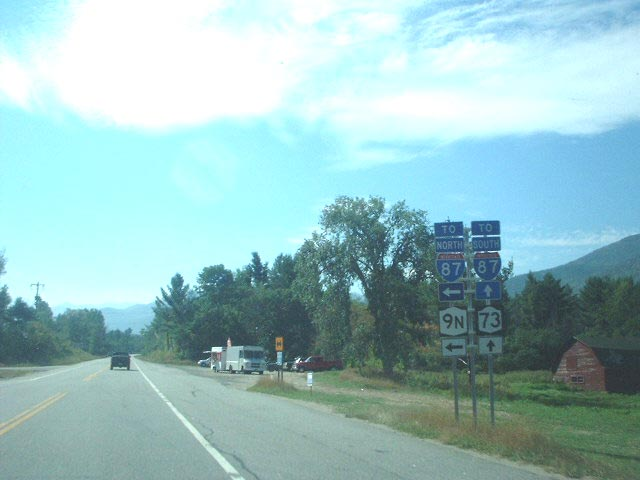
NY 73 at NY 9N in Keene

NY 73 exits Lake Placid, where it passes Lake Placid Airport. There, County Route 35 (CR 35) merges from the northwest, providing a bypass around the village of Lake Placid to NY 86. Just south of North Elba, NY 73 passes the Lake Placid Olympic Ski Jumping Complex, accessible via John Brown Road (unsigned NY 910M) to nearby John Brown's Farm at the intersection with CR 35. The highway crosses the West Branch of the Ausable River, intersecting with CR 21 at an elevation of 1,800 feet (550 m).

Cascade Road makes several turns, passing south of the Craig Wood Golf Course. After the golf course, NY 73 climbs in elevation, up to 2,000 feet (610 m). The highway turns from the southeast to the east, and to the southeast once more as it rounds Round Lake, where it intersects Bobsled Run Lane (unsigned New York State Route 913Q). The road passes Mud Pond, where it turns to the northeast along the side of a high ridge. Pitchoff Mountain is directly to the northwest as NY 73 passes Upper Cascade and Lower Cascade Lakes.

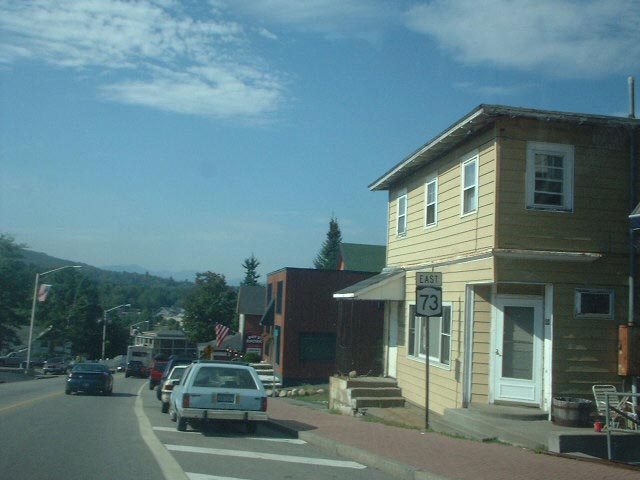
First reassurance shield along NY 73 eastbound in Lake Placid

NY 73 begins to descend in elevation, while CR 51 splits off and NY 73 heads into Keene. After crossing the East Branch of the Ausable River, NY 73 merges in with NY 9N. The two roads continue to drop in elevation, passing and circling mountains as they head along. After Norton Cemetery, NY 9N splits off to the east and NY 73 continues southward. NY 73 now runs along the East Branch, intersecting with county and local roads as it heads southward.

The highway heads along the base of Porter Mountain and into Keene Valley, crosses Johns Brook and heads through downtown. Lower Wolfjaw Mountain, which averages the same height as Porter, is nearby. NY 73 continues, eventually crossing the Ausable River branch, later coming in the towns of Elizabethtown and North Hudson. There are a few more ponds and mountains before NY 73 ends at an intersection with US 9.

According to estimates made by the New York State Department of Transportation (NYSDOT) in 2009, NY 73 serves an average of 1,950 vehicles per day from US 9 to the east end of the NY 9N overlap in Keene. The overlap with NY 9N accumulated an average of 4,360 vehicles, with the stretch up to the control station at having a less amount of traffic. After NY 913Q, the average increases, peaking at 4,810 vehicles at NY 86 in Lake Placid.

== History ==
=== Early highways ===
==== North West Bay Road ====
The area that is now known as the hamlet of Keene—the modern junction of NY 9N and NY 73—was first settled at the beginning of the 19th century. Many of the early settlers arrived in the region by traveling along a rough and nearly unusable highway connecting what became Keene to Jay in the north and Lewis in the east. By 1810, part of the crude roadway had been supplanted by a privately funded highway leading westward from Westport to at least North Elba and possibly to Saranac Lake by way of Keene. On April 5, 1810, the New York State Legislature passed an act establishing a new state highway linking Westport to Hopkinton by way of Keene and Saranac Lake. The highway incorporated the entirety of the pre-existing roadway between Westport and Saranac Lake.

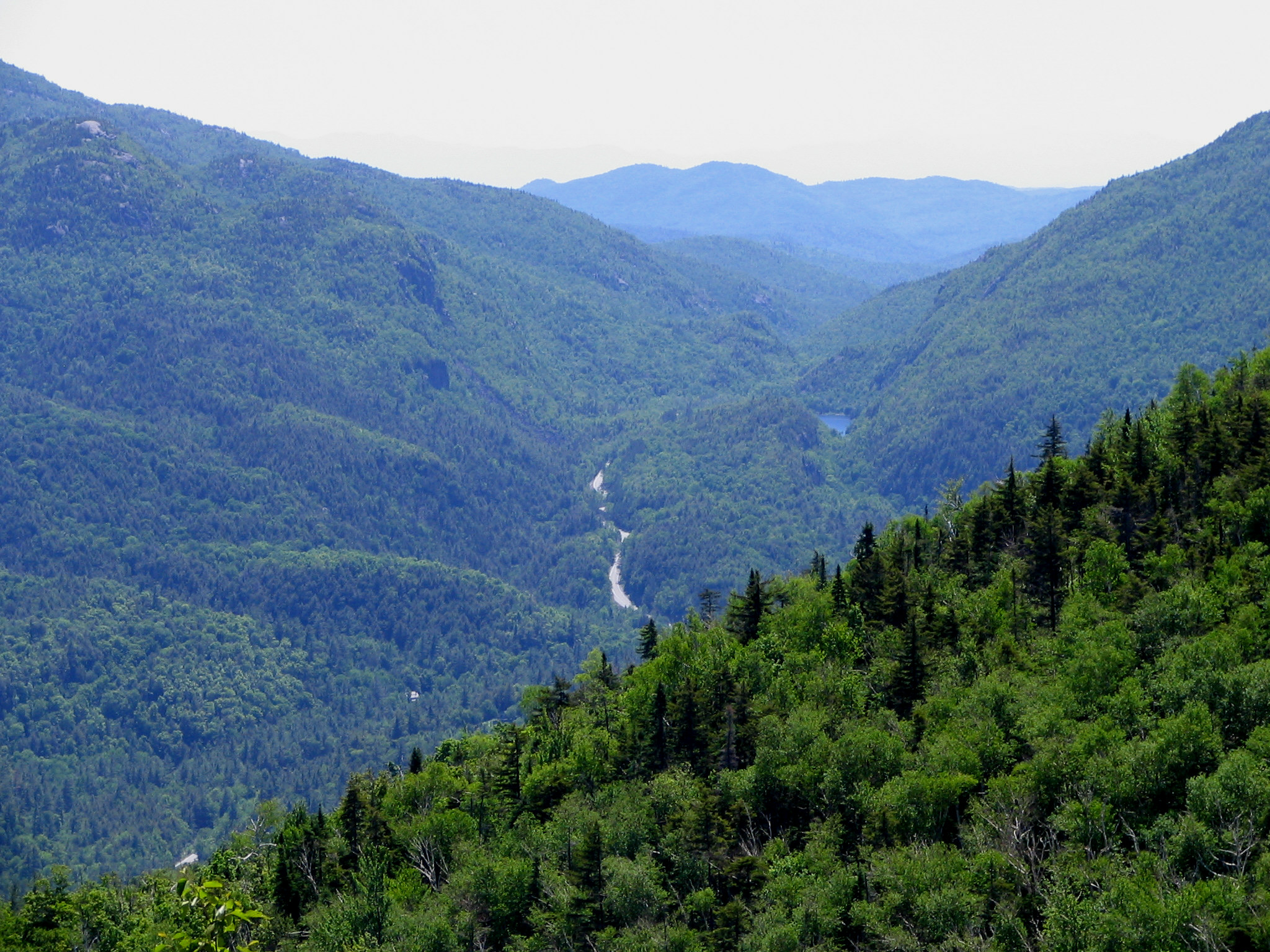
NY 73 through Keene Valley as seen from Rooster Comb Mountain

Initially, the state highway was poorly constructed and largely impassable, mirroring the condition of the roadways that preceded it. An act passed by the state legislature on June 19, 1812, indicated that the funds that had been allocated to the highway were "entirely inadequate to open and improve" the road. On April 17, 1816, the state attempted to correct the issue by approving a measure that appointed two sets of commissioners to oversee the reconstruction of the highway. Each set was to work on opposite ends of the route and eventually converge at a point midway along the route. Work on the highway was completed by 1818. The road was officially named the "North West Bay Road"; however, it eventually became known as the "Old Military Road". The route did not enter the village of Lake Placid; instead, it bypassed it to the southwest. This portion of the highway is still known today by the latter name.

==== Other highways ====
The highway through Keene Valley from Underwood to Keene was built by 1846. At its southern end, it connected to a major stagecoach road that connected Albany to the Canadian border. The route fostered the rise of local lumber and tanning industries; up to 40 wagon loads of timber used the stagecoach route daily. Various hotels and taverns opened in the nearby town of North Hudson to serve travelers along the route.

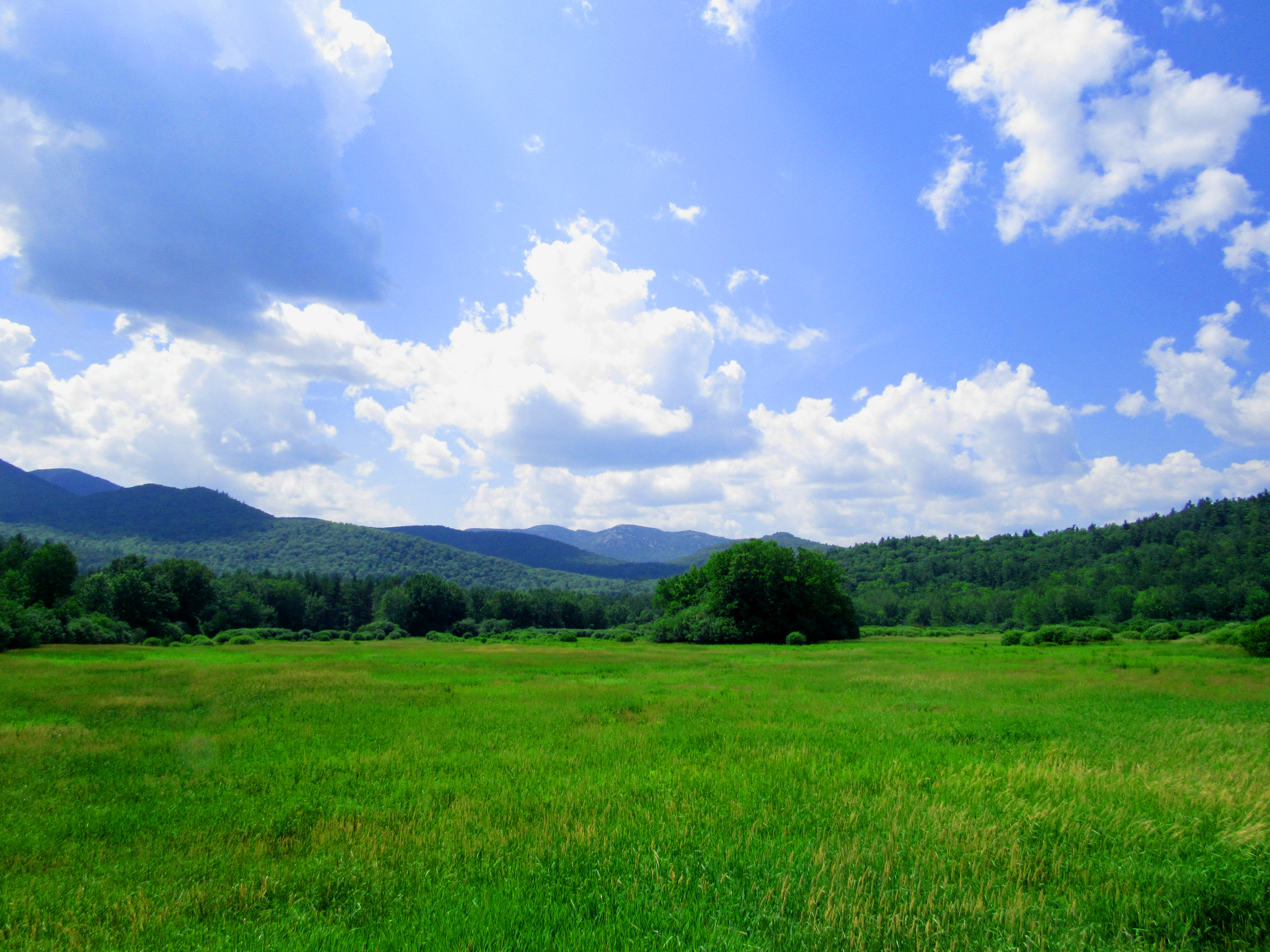
Scenic view from Route 73 in Keene, NY.

=== State ownership and designations ===
In 1909, the state of New York began to take control of many private highways across the state under the terms of the new highway law developed in 1908. One of these highways was the old north–south stagecoach road from Albany to Canada. Most of the highway north of modern NY 8 in Chester became the northern half of Route 22, an unsigned legislative route, under the text of the highway law. In 1913, the New York State Legislature created Route 22-b, a spur route connecting Route 22 in Schroon to the then-village of Ticonderoga. On March 1, 1921, Route 22-b became part of Route 48, a new route created as part of a partial renumbering of New York's legislative route system. The path of the former Albany–Canada stagecoach route was largely designated as US 9 in 1927.

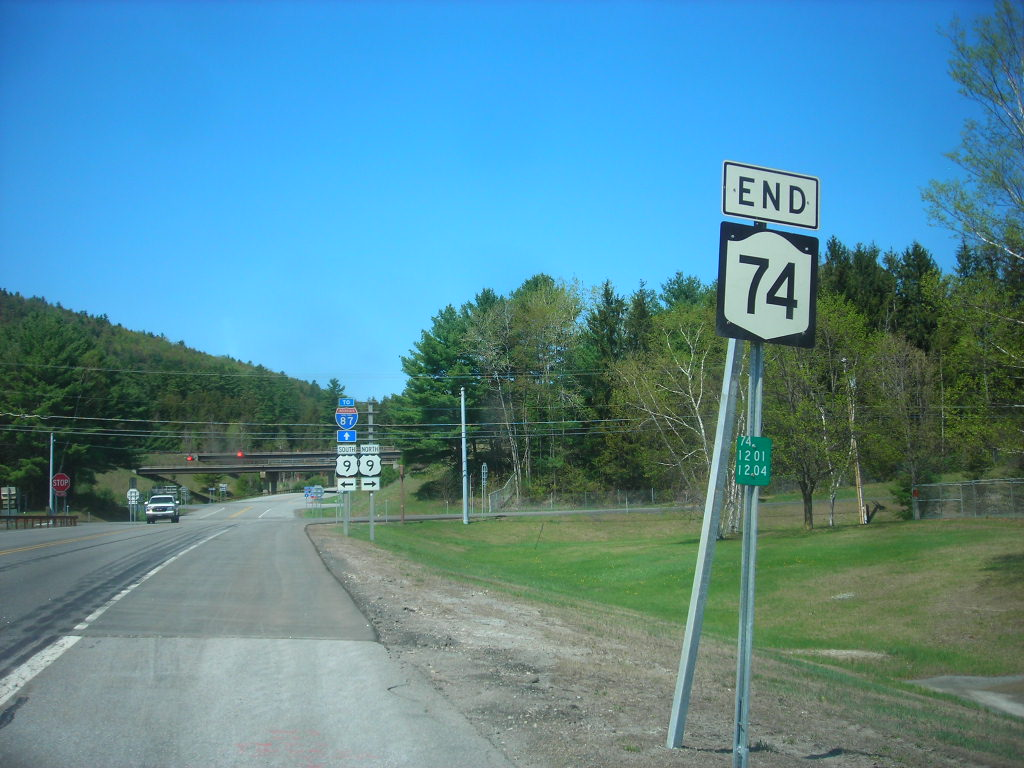
Signage at the former western terminus of NY 73 in Schroon

NY 73 was assigned as part of the 1930 renumbering of state highways in New York; however, it did not initially follow any of its modern routing. It began at an intersection with NY 28N in Tahawus and followed the Blue Ridge Road east to US 9 in North Hudson. From there, it overlapped US 9 south to Schroon, where it proceeded eastward on the former legislative Route 48 to Ticonderoga, where it ended at a junction with NY 22. At the time, modern NY 73 from Lake Placid to Keene—identical to the old North West Bay Road east of the Lake Placid area—was assigned NY 86A. The remainder of what is now NY 73 from Keene south to Underwood was designated as NY 427 within a year's time.

The portion of NY 73 between Tahawus and North Hudson was removed from the state highway system c. 1936. As a result, NY 73 was truncated to a new western terminus at US 9 in Schroon, eliminating the concurrency with US 9. To the north, NY 427 was supplanted by an extended NY 86A c. 1938. In November 1952, NY 73 was extended eastward through Ticonderoga to the ferry dock on Lake Champlain, where it connected to the Fort Ticonderoga–Larrabees Point Ferry. The change supplanted NY 347, a short spur route off NY 22 that had been in place since c. 1934. A month earlier, NY 73 was extended northward to Lake Placid via Underwood and Keene, replacing NY 86A and overlapping US 9 from Severance to Underwood. NY 73 was truncated to its current eastern terminus in Underwood on July 1, 1971, eliminating the 16-mile (26 km) overlap with US 9. Its former routing from Schroon to Lake Champlain was renumbered to NY 74.

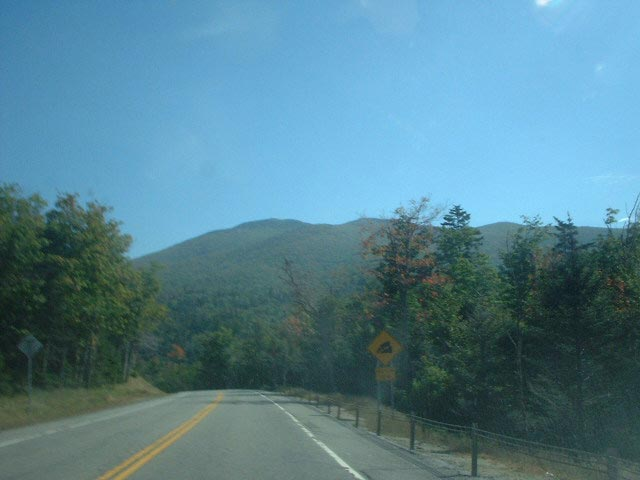
NY 73 approaching a steep grade with a mountain of the Adirondacks in view

On September 14, 1994, the state of New York signed a proposal to turn NY 73 into a scenic byway into law. The 30-mile (48 km) byway, known as the "High Peaks Scenic Byway", begins at the western terminus of NY 73 in Lake Placid and follows NY 73 and US 9 to Interstate 87 exit 30. In December 1994, the group Scenic America designated the highway as one of the ten most scenic areas in the nation.

== Future ==
In 2009, NYSDOT has made plans to repair seven bridges along NY 73. The seven projects will cost the state an estimated $11.1 million (equivalent to $16.3 million in 2024) and are tentatively scheduled to begin at various times between 2013 and 2016. The $11 million cost includes $4.3 million for two bridges over the West Branch of the Ausable River that were built in 1932, $1.3 million for a bridge over the Southern Fork of the Bouquet River in Keene, $2.6 million for two bridges over Beede Brook that were built in 1935 and 1936, $1.3 million for a bridge over the outlet of Lower Cascade Lake, and $1.6 million for a bridge over Johns Brook.

== Major intersections ==
Note: Although NY 73 is signed east-west, traffic data reports, inventory listings and reference markers indicate that it is a north-south route. The entire route is in Essex County.

Location	mi	km	Destinations	Notes
Elizabethtown	0.00	0.00	US 9 to I-87 – Elizabethtown, Schroon Lake, Ticonderoga	Eastern terminus; to I-87 via US 9 south
Keene	11.48	18.48	NY 9N south to I-87 north – Elizabethtown	Southern terminus of NY 9N / NY 73 overlap
Keene	13.32	21.44	NY 9N north – Upper Jay, Whiteface Mountain	Northern terminus of NY 9N / NY 73 overlap; hamlet of Keene
North Elba	21.22	34.15	Bobsled Run Lane ( NY 913Q) – Mount Van Hoevenberg	Eastern terminus of unsigned NY 913Q
North Elba	26.02	41.88	John Brown Road ( NY 910M) – John Brown Farm	Northern terminus of unsigned NY 910M
Lake Placid	27.55	44.34	NY 86 (Main Street / Wilmington Road) – Saranac Lake, Wilmington, Whiteface Mountain	Western terminus
1.000 mi = 1.609 km; 1.000 km = 0.621 mi: Concurrency terminus

== See also ==
- New York State Route 97, another state highway that is entirely a scenic byway
