= Autoroute 25 =

Autoroute 25 may refer to:

- A25 autoroute, in France
- Quebec Autoroute 25, in Quebec, Canada

== See also ==
- A25 roads
- List of highways numbered 25
