= State Route 74 (New York–Vermont) =

Highway in Vermont and New York

Route 74
- NY 74 and VT 74 highlighted in red

Route information
- Maintained by NYSDOT and VTrans
- Length: 33.713 mi (54.256 km) 20.45 mi in New York; 13.263 mi in Vermont
- History: NY 74 designated NY 73 in 1930; renumbered to NY 74 on July 1, 1972; VT 74 assigned 1954

Major junctions
- West end: I-87 in Schroon, New York
- NY 9N / NY 22 in Ticonderoga, New York; VT 22A in Shoreham, Vermont
- East end: VT 30 in Cornwall, Vermont

Location
- Country: United States
- States: New York, Vermont
- Counties: New York: Essex; Vermont: Addison

Highway system
- New York Highways; Interstate; US; State; Reference; Parkways
- State highways in Vermont
| ← NY 73 | New York | → NY 75 |
| ← VT 73A | Vermont | → VT 78 |
| ← VT F-8 | VT F-9 | → VT F-10 |

New York State Route 74 (NY 74) and Vermont Route 74 (VT 74) are state highways in the northeastern United States, connected by one of the last remaining cable ferries in North America. Together they extend for 34 miles (55 km) through Essex County, New York, and Addison County, Vermont. NY 74 begins at exit 28 off Interstate 87 (I-87) in the hamlet of Severance in the Adirondack Mountains region of the northern part of New York State. It extends 20.44 miles (32.89 km) to the western shore of Lake Champlain in Ticonderoga. There, the seasonal Fort Ticonderoga–Larrabees Point Ferry carries cars across the state border into Vermont, where VT 74 starts at the lake's eastern shore and terminates 13.26 miles (21.34 km) later at a junction with VT 30 in the town of Cornwall.

The ferry connecting the two highways, predating both NY 74 and VT 74, began operation in 1759 on an informal basis. The ferry operation was formalized at the close of the 18th century and upgraded to a cable system in 1946.

Due to extensive changes in designations in both states during the 20th century, the entire length of the present highway consists of renamed segments from other highways. The New York portion of the cross-state Route 74 west of Ticonderoga was designated as part of NY 73 in the 1930 renumbering of state highways in New York, while the Vermont section carried several different designations from the 1920s to the late 1930s, when it became solely part of Vermont Route F-9. NY 73 was extended east to Lake Champlain in the 1950s—replacing New York State Route 347—and VT F-9 was split into VT 73 and VT 74 shortly afterward. The Schroon–Ticonderoga highway was redesignated as NY 74 on July 1, 1972 after NY 73 was cut back to its current eastern terminus in Elizabethtown.

== Route description ==
=== NY 74 ===
NY 74 originates at exit 28 of the Adirondack Northway (I-87) in the town of Schroon. The starting interchange is close to local landmark Severance Hill, which reaches an elevation of 1,600 feet (490 m). NY 74 intersects the north–south U.S. Route 9 (US 9) shortly after the northbound ramps of the Adirondack Northway. It then meets Stowell Road just before crossing the Schroon River. The highway meets a few local road intersections just south of Goosebury Hill before encountering Paradox Lake. NY 74 runs mostly parallel to the lake and intersects with a local campground entrance road as it continues eastward from Schroon.

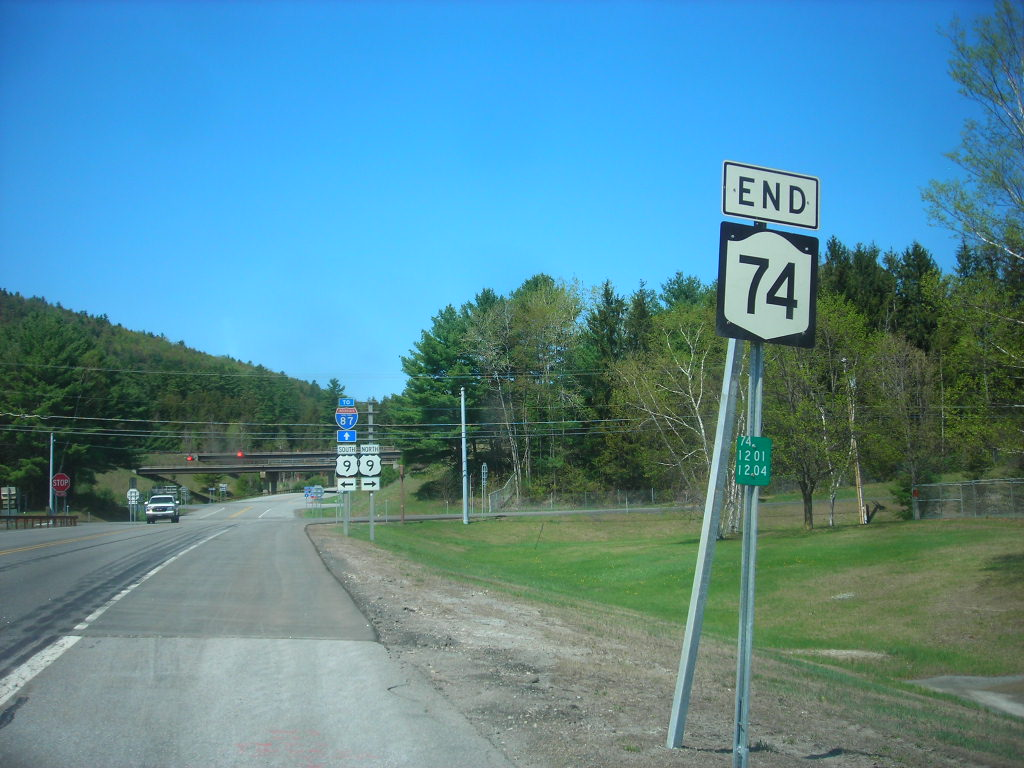
The western terminus of NY 74 at I-87. The end sign, however, is located at US 9.

Cotters Pond is a small landmark located beyond a few mountains and hills on the southern side of NY 74 near the end of Paradox Lake. Cotters Pond, by state law, is a water body that cannot be used for baitfishing; this was designated by the New York State Department of Environmental Conservation. Shortly afterward, NY 74 passes Bumbo Pond and enters the hamlet of Paradox. After leaving Paradox, NY 74 turns to the southeast along the base of Skiff Mountain. The highway then approaches a creek that flows into Eagle Lake. NY 74 crosses over Eagle Lake and runs along the base of Eagle Cliff and the shores of the lake. After leaving Eagle Lake, the highway intersects with County Route 2 (CR 2), the first numbered highway that NY 74 encounters after US 9.

This stretch of NY 74 skirts the base of Keeney Mountain, which peaks at 1,400 feet (430 m). NY 74 then intersects with CR 56, which parallels the main route to the south. CR 56 merges back with NY 74, which leaves the mountainous region for the hamlet of Ticonderoga. NY 74 intersects with NY 9N and NY 22 in the hamlet; the latter of the two highways becomes concurrent with NY 74. NY 22 and NY 74 continue to the east, heading around the outskirts of Ticonderoga. NY 74 intersects with CR 49 before NY 74 turns to the southeast. NY 22 and NY 74 head southward toward the center of Ticonderoga. At the intersection with Montcalm Street, NY 74 turns eastward off NY 22, which heads southward for Washington County.

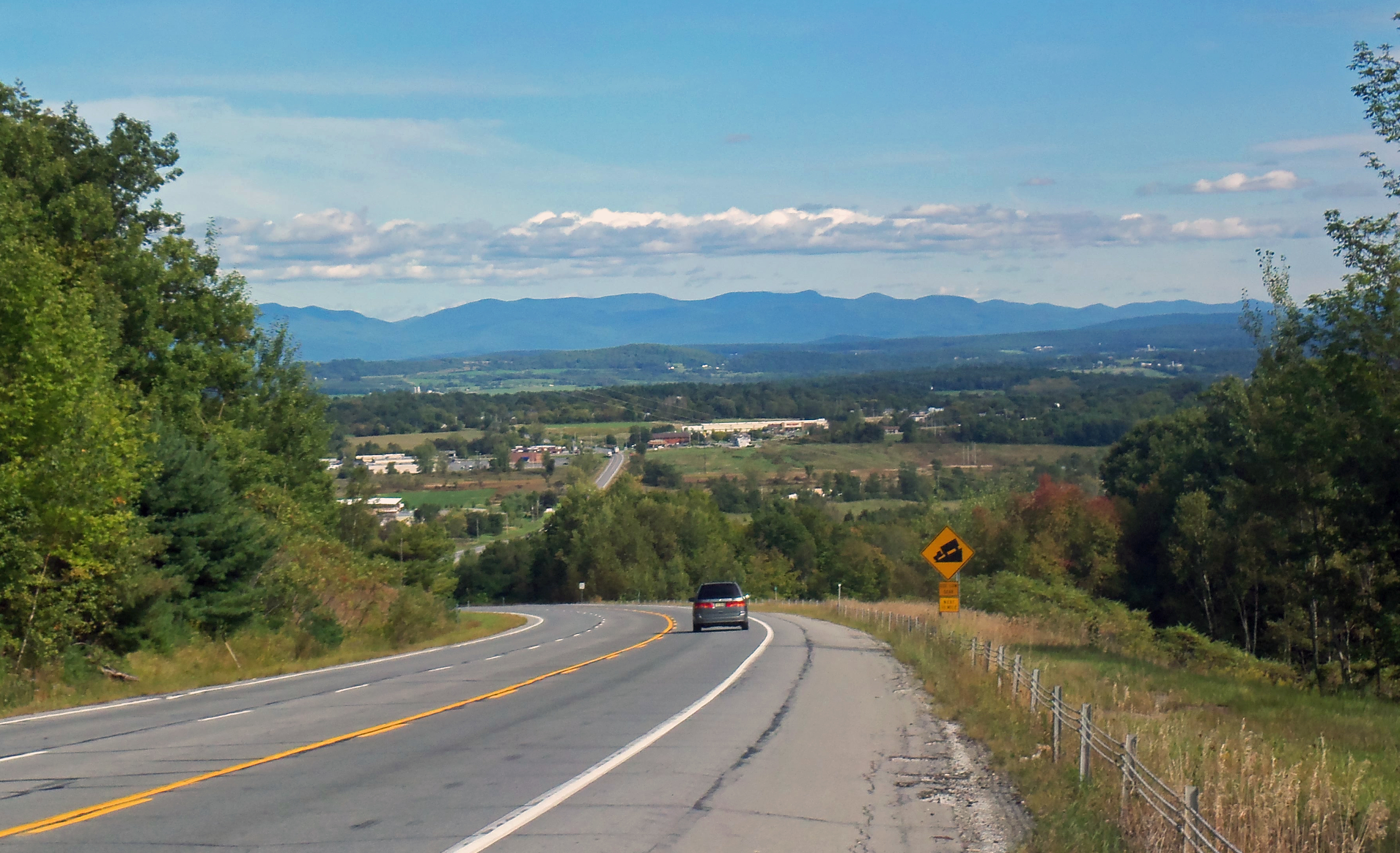
View towards Vermont as NY 74 descends to Ticonderoga

NY 74 crosses local roads as it continues eastward toward Lake Champlain. The highway passes the entrance to Fort Ticonderoga and the Ticonderoga Amtrak station. The New York portion of NY 74 terminates at a ferry landing by Lake Champlain at the state border.

=== Fort Ticonderoga–Larrabees Point Ferry ===
The Fort Ticonderoga–Larrabees Point Ferry is the oldest and southernmost ferry on Lake Champlain. Its cable system consists of two 1.1-inch (2.8 cm) steel cables in parallel alignment. The current ferry barge, in operation since 1959, is powered by a sixteen-ton tugboat built in 1979 that can hold up to 18 cars. The seasonal ferry route is half a mile long and operates from May through October. The seven-minute passage operates during daylight hours.

=== VT 74 ===
After crossing the state line via the Fort Ticonderoga–Larrabees Point Ferry, VT 74 begins its track into Vermont. The highway heads a short distance to the north, passing a thinly populated area in Shoreham, as intermittent forest yields to fields and farmlands. After 0.49 miles (790 m) from the border, VT 74 intersects with VT 73 before encountering Barnum Hill Road. Near the Barnum Hill intersection, VT 74 passes developed areas and bends more toward the north. VT 74 then turns to the northeast at Smith Street and enters a patch of forest. Afterward VT 74 climbs a hill and intersects with Harrington Hill Road where it turns northward once again.

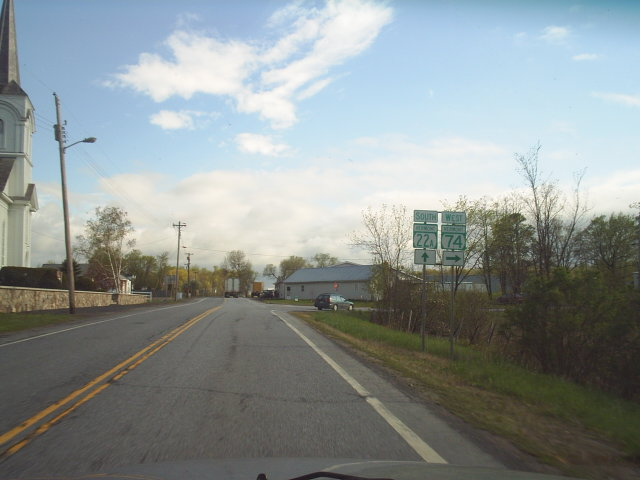
Signs at the southern end of VT 74's concurrency with VT 22A

Fields and forests surround this thinly populated stretch of highway. At the intersection with Blue Harbor Road, VT 74 turns to the east and heads toward downtown Shoreham. Within central Shoreham, VT 74 is known as Main Street and has a short concurrency with VT 22A. As VT 74 leaves the densely populated portion of Shoreham, the concurrency ends and VT 74 takes an eastward turn toward Cornwall.

As VT 74 returns to the rural countryside it bends toward the northeast for most of the distance to Cornwall. Through this stretch the highway winds through forests and occasional farmland. VT 74 straightens at an intersection with Bates Road. A connector road called North Palmer Road merges with VT 74 shortly afterward. VT 74 winds again for a stretch and straightens a second time near the intersection with Elmendorf Road as it continues toward Cornwall, intersecting with several town highways and approaching increasingly residential areas. At Clark Road in Cornwall, VT 74 turns to the northeast once again, passing through more forests before terminating at VT 30 in Cornwall.

== Early history ==
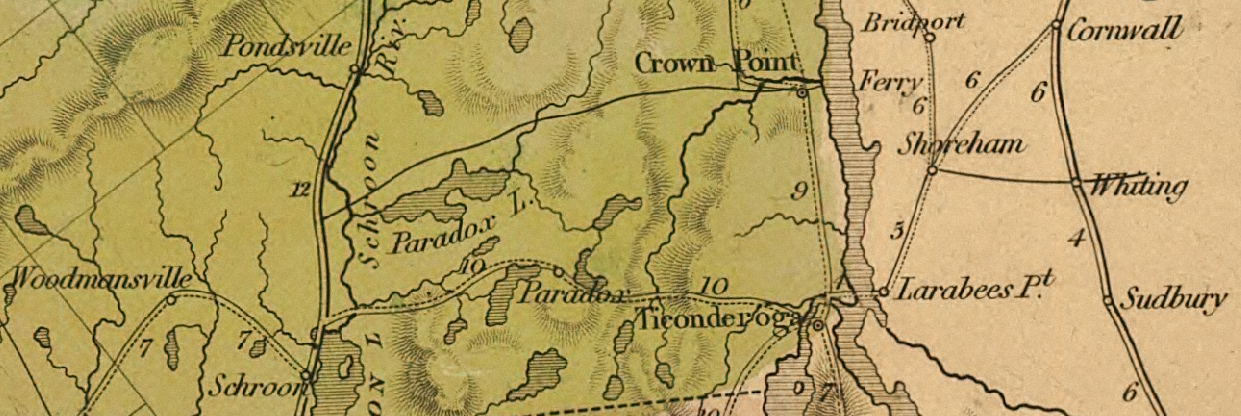
The predecessor of NY 79 and surrounding region, detail from an 1839 map of New York State

=== Schroon and its early highways ===
Settlers of European descent began to populate the region near modern Schroon around 1797. The area's first municipality was the town of Crown Point, which originally included considerable portions of thinly populated land that later developed into separate townships. The first of these divisions occurred on March 20, 1804 with the establishment of the town of Schroon. Minerva split from Crown Point in March 1817, before another municipal reorganization in 1840 implemented further reductions to the land area of Crown Point. During this period two thoroughfares served the area that correspond to parts of modern NY 74 and US 9. One of these old state roads traversed the route covered by the current alignment of NY 74 from Schroon to Ticonderoga.

The entire length of NY 74 from Ticonderoga to Schroon covers the route that the Ticonderoga and Schroon Turnpike Road Company (chartered in April 1832) was to toll. Two toll gates were to be erected specifically for use on the highway, and the charter allowed for additional toll gates at a spacing of approximately one for every ten miles of completed highway. The turnpike management was to raise funds by selling 600 shares valued at $25 (equivalent to $806 in 2025) each. $20,000 (equivalent to $689,451 in 2024) was also set aside for properties along the highway. Beyond its charter, there is no further mention of the company in New York state law; therefore, it's possible that the company folded before the completion of a turnpike.

== Designation history ==
=== Designations from 1913 to the 1930s ===
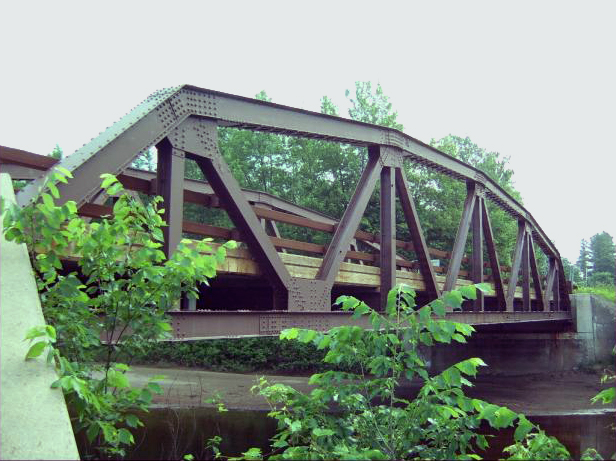
A truss bridge on NY 74 in Essex County

In 1913, the New York State Legislature designated most of modern NY 74 as Route 22-b, an unsigned legislative route. It ran for 17.06 miles (27.46 km) from Route 22 (now US 9) in Schroon to the western edge of the then-village of Ticonderoga. On March 1, 1921, Route 22-b became part of Route 48, a new route created as part of a partial renumbering of New York's legislative route system. In 1924, when state highways were first publicly signed with route numbers, the highway from Schroon to Ticonderoga remained unnumbered. During the 1930 renumbering of state highways in New York, the segment of modern NY 74 between US 9 in Schroon and NY 22 in Ticonderoga was designated as part of NY 73, a route extending from NY 28N in Tahawus to Ticonderoga. NY 73 followed the Blue Ridge Road from Tahawus to North Hudson and had an overlap with US 9 from North Hudson to Schroon.

The portion of NY 73 between Tahawus and North Hudson was removed from the state highway system c. 1936. As a result, NY 73 was truncated to a new western terminus at US 9 in Schroon, eliminating the concurrency with US 9.

The Blue Ridge Road is now designated as CR 84 from NY 28N in Tawahus to the Adirondack Northway in North Hudson, and as NY 910K, a short unsigned reference route, from the Northway to US 9.

On the Vermont side, the road connecting Larrabees Point to the main north–south highways in the area was designated as VT F-9 by 1926. VT F-9 began at the ferry landing at Larrabees Point and continued northeast to Shoreham Center, where it briefly overlapped with then-VT 30A (modern VT 22A). Past VT 30A, VT F-9 continued east along what are now town highways through Whiting to Leicester, where it ended at a junction with US 7. At the time, modern VT 74 between Shoreham and Cornwall centers was known as VT F-9A while what is now VT 73 from Larrabees Point to Brown Lane north of the town center of Orwell was part of VT F-10A.

=== Changes from 1933 onward ===
By 1933, the highway linking NY 22 in Ticonderoga to the ferry for Larrabees Point became part of NY 8. NY 8 was realigned c. 1934 to follow NY 22 north from Ticonderoga to Crown Point, where it left NY 22 to follow NY 347 (modern NY 185) to the Champlain Bridge. The NY 347 designation was reassigned to NY 8's former routing between NY 22 and the ferry landing east of Ticonderoga.

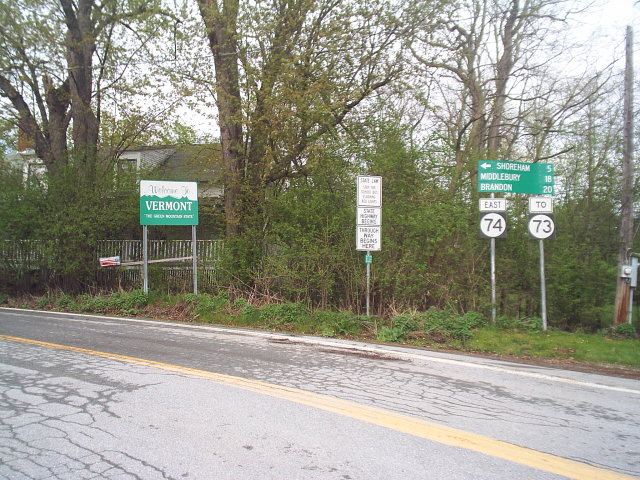
VT 74 departing from the Larabees Point ferry landing

VT F-9, meanwhile, was extended southward to Orwell over VT F-10A by 1938. Like VT F-10A, it initially bypassed Orwell to the north on Brown Lane; however, it was realigned in the late 1930s to follow modern VT 73 into Orwell. Around the same time, VT F-9 was realigned east of Shoreham to follow VT F-9A northeast to Cornwall. The VT F-9A designation was eliminated while the former routing of VT F-9 between Shoreham and Leicester became unnumbered. In November 1952, New York extended NY 73 east to the ferry landing by way of NY 347 and Wicker and Montcalm Streets. Vermont renumbered the Larrabees Point–Orwell section of VT F-9 to VT 73 in 1954 in order to match the New York route number. At the same time, the Larrabees Point–Cornwall section of VT F-9 was renumbered by Vermont to VT 74.

NY 73 was truncated to its current eastern terminus in Underwood on July 1, 1972, eliminating a lengthy overlap with US 9, while its former routing from Schroon to Lake Champlain was renumbered to NY 74, matching the other Vermont route number that ends in Larrabees Point. The already existing NY 74 in Chautauqua County (in the Jamestown area) was renumbered to NY 474 as a result. The opening of the Adirondack Northway in 1967 also resulted in a slight shift of the western terminus of NY 74 from US 9 to I-87. By 1981, NY 74 was rerouted to follow its current alignment around the northeastern edge of Ticonderoga, on a concurrency with NY 22. The highway has remained the same since that date.

The New York State Department of Transportation has announced a project to repave NY 74 from Chilson to Paradox. The project is in preliminary development, with construction is expected to begin in early 2013 and reach completion about a year later. Funding will come from state sources and run an estimated cost of $8.6 million.

== Ferry history ==
According to its website, the ferry operated informally from 1759 and in an organized way from 1799. The earliest ferries are believed to have been rowboats or canoes; "a double-ended sailing scow was in service by 1800. This vessel was about 30 feet (9.1 m) long, with a mainsail that would swing completely around the mast to provide a simple means of reversing course."

Ferry size continued to increase with traffic until the system upgraded to a cable guidance system in 1946. John S. Larrabee of Vermont established the first regular ferry at the location in the late 18th century. The Vermont State Legislature approved a franchise for a ferry from Larrabees Point to Ticonderoga in 1907, to the Shoreham and Ticonderoga Ferry Company. The New York State Legislature granted the ferry a franchise in 1918.

== Major intersections ==
| State | County | Location | mi | km | Destinations | Notes |
|---|---|---|---|---|---|---|
| New York | Essex | Schroon | 0.00 | 0.00 | I-87 – Plattsburgh, Montreal, Albany | Western terminus, exit 28 on I-87 |
| New York | Essex | Schroon | 0.17 | 0.27 | US 9 – Schroon Lake, North Hudson, Elizabethtown | |
| New York | Essex | Ticonderoga | 17.41 | 28.02 | NY 9N (Wicker Street) / NY 22 north – Ticonderoga, Crown Point | Western end of NY 22 concurrency |
| New York | Essex | Ticonderoga | 19.03 | 30.63 | NY 22 south (Mountain Road) – Whitehall | Eastern end of NY 22 concurrency |
| Lake Champlain | | | 20.45 0.000 | 32.91 0.000 | Fort Ticonderoga–Larrabees Point Ferry; New York–Vermont state line | |
| Vermont | Addison | Shoreham | 0.493 | 0.793 | VT 73 east – Orwell, Brandon | Western terminus of VT 73 |
| Vermont | Addison | Shoreham | 5.241 | 8.435 | VT 22A south – Orwell, Fair Haven | Western end of VT 22A concurrency |
| Vermont | Addison | Shoreham | 5.670 | 9.125 | VT 22A north – Bridport, Vergennes | Eastern end of VT 22A concurrency |
| Vermont | Addison | Cornwall | 13.263 | 21.345 | VT 30 – Middlebury, Whiting | Eastern terminus |
1.000 mi = 1.609 km; 1.000 km = 0.621 mi: Concurrency terminus; Route transition
