= New York State Route 9W =

New York State Route 9W may refer to:

- New York State Route 9W (1927–1930) in Essex and Clinton counties
- U.S. Route 9W, The route that parallels the western side of the Hudson River
