= A25 =

A25, A 25 or A-25 may refer to:

- Aero A.25, a Czech military training aircraft of the 1920s
- HLA-A25, an HLA-A serotype
- Junkers A 25, a German two-seater cantilever monoplane
- Article 25, a UK development and disaster relief charity
- A25 accident report form formerly used by the Fleet Air Arm and featured in a World War II song
- Samsung Galaxy A25, an Android-based smartphone by Samsung Electronics

== See also ==
- English Opening in the Encyclopaedia of Chess Openings
- Curtiss A-25 Shrike, a World War II dive bomber variant of SB2C Helldiver
- List of highways numbered 25

== Roads ==
- List of A25 roads
