= List of highways in Essex County, New York =

- Standard route marker for county routes in Essex County

- Map of Essex County's highway system

Highway names
- Interstates: Interstate X (I-X)
- US Highways: U.S. Route X (US X)
- State: New York State Route X (NY X)
- County: County Route X (CR X)

System links
- New York Highways; Interstate; US; State; Reference; Parkways

The highway system of Essex County, New York, comprises 1,367.8 miles (2,201.3 km) of roads maintained by the New York State Department of Transportation, the county, and its towns and villages. Eighteen state-maintained highways enter the county, which account for a combined 329.4 miles (530.1 km) of the state highway mileage in New York. The state roads are supplemented by 356.7 miles (574.1 km) of county-maintained highways, most of which serve as collector roads between state highways. Several highways within the borders of the county serve as connections to ferry landings and bridges across Lake Champlain.

Essex County is served by one Interstate Highway, I-87, known locally as the Adirondack Northway. US 9, the only United States Numbered Highway in the county, closely parallels I-87 as both highways head north–south across the county. Essex County is also served by 11 state touring routes and six reference routes, the latter of which are short unsigned connectors. The longest touring route in Essex County is NY 9N, which runs for 67.69 miles (108.94 km) through the county. The county's shortest touring route is NY 373, which runs for 3.20 miles (5.15 km) in the northeastern part of Essex County.

== Highways ==
=== Interstate and US Highways ===
There is one interstate highway in Essex County, I-87, stretching for 57.23 miles (92.10 km) from the Warren County line near Schroon Lake to the Clinton County line north of Keeseville. The highway was assigned after being built in 1967 to connect Keeseville to the Clinton County line, paralleling the alignment of US 9.

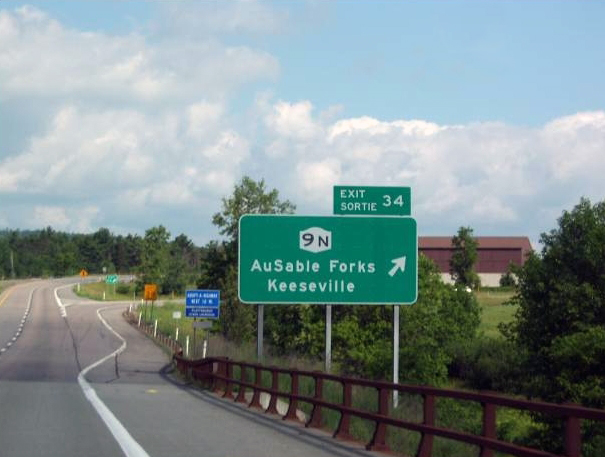
Signage for exit 34 (NY 915F) along the Northway (I-87)

There is one U.S. Route in Essex County, US 9, which runs for 58.99 miles (94.94 km) in two segments. The first, spanning 57.83 miles (93.07 km), enters from Warren County near Schroon Lake before entering Clinton County temporarily. The second, spanning 1.16 miles (1.87 km), stretches from both lines of Clinton County. US 9 was assigned in the area in 1926 along a stagecoach route and has remained virtually unchanged since.

=== State touring routes ===
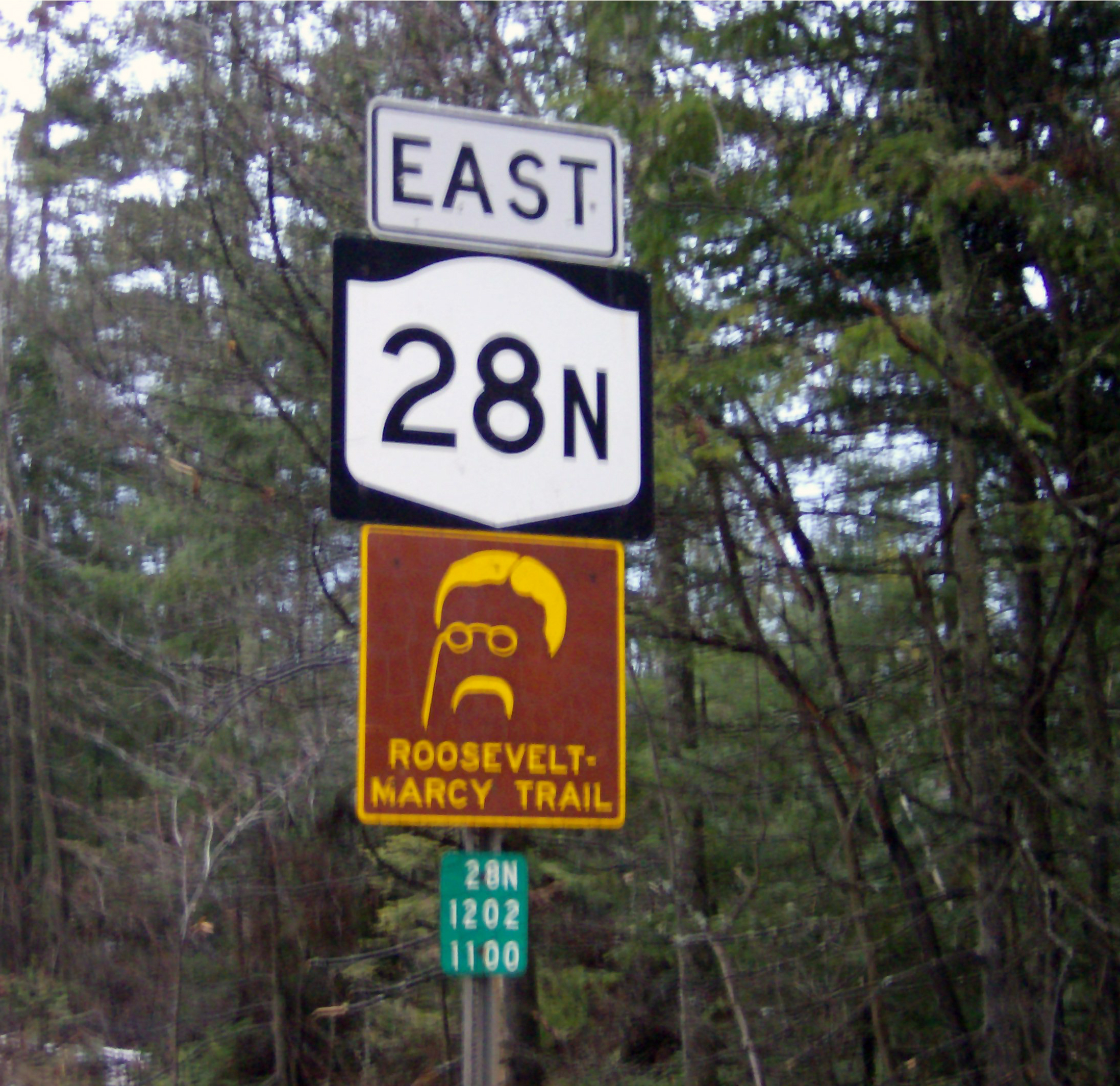
NY 28N sign along with Roosevelt–Marcy Trail Marker

There are 10 state touring routes in Essex county, the longest of which is NY 9N at 67.69 miles (108.94 km), which stretches from the Warren County line near Lake George to the Clinton County line north of Willsboro. The shortest is NY 373, running for 3.20 miles (5.15 km). Some state highways which once entered Essex County have been eliminated, including NY 192 (now part of NY 86), NY 427 and NY 86A (both now part of NY 73); others, like NY 8, still exist but no longer pass through the county. NY 8 was once concurrent with Routes 9N and 22, which continue into Essex County from Warren County, and the route ended in Crown Point at the Vermont border. The northernmost segment of NY 8's former routing through the county is now NY 185.

=== State reference routes ===
There are six reference routes in Essex County; a seventh, NY 910L, was redesignated NY 185 on April 4, 2008, as part of a New York State Department of Transportation project to rehabilitate the Champlain Bridge. Around this time, there was an addition to the highway system, with the designation of NY 915K, a short connector leading to exit 33 on the Adirondack Northway. The longest reference route is NY 910M at 0.81 miles (1.30 km), running from John Brown's Grave to NY 73. The other three reference routes are NY 910K (part of the Blue Ridge Road), NY 912T (the shortest reference route, at 0.12 miles (0.19 km), and a connector to NY 373), and NY 913Q, which serves Mount Van Hoevenberg in North Elba.

=== County routes ===
There are over 60 county routes in Essex County, signed with the pentagonal county highway shields found in most of the state. The first in order is CR 2, also known as Corduroy Road and Creek Road in Ticonderoga; the last is CR 86E, known locally as Saint Huberts Road in Saint Huberts. In Keene, there are five county routes along NY 73 that are former alignments of NY 86A, which previously ran along that alignment.

== List of Interstate, US, and state highways ==
The chart below shows the Interstate, U.S., and state highways that enter or have previously entered Essex County, and the towns they serve or served in order of how the road encounters them. The "Formed" column refers to the date that the route was assigned or extended into the county; likewise, "Removed" refers to the date that the route ceased to exist within the Essex County limits. The measurements given in the "Length" columns refer to a route's length within Essex County.

Route	Length (mi)	Length (km)	Formed	Removed	Locations
I-87	57.23	92.10	1967	—	Schroon, North Hudson, Elizabethtown, Westport, Lewis, Chesterfield
US 9	58.99	94.94	1926	—	South Schroon, Schroon Lake, Schroon, North Hudson, Underwood, New Russia, Elizabethtown, Lewis, Chesterfield, Keeseville, Ausable Chasm
NY 3	6.90	11.10	1924	—	Saranac Lake, Bloomingdale, St. Armand
NY 8	26.03	41.89	1930	1960s	Ticonderoga, Crown Point
NY 9N	67.69	108.94	1930	—	Ticonderoga, Crown Point, Port Henry, Moriah, Westport, Elizabethtown, Keene, Upper Jay, Jay, Au Sable Forks
NY 22	61.02	98.20	1924	—	Ticonderoga, Crown Point, Port Henry, Moriah, Westport, Wadhams, Whallonsburg, Essex, Willsboro, Chesterfield, Keeseville
NY 28N	26.81	43.15	1930	—	Olmstedville, Minerva, Newcomb
NY 73	27.60	44.42	1930	—	Lake Placid, North Elba, Keene, Keene Valley, Underwood
NY 74	20.44	32.89	1930	—	Schroon, Severance, Paradox, Ticonderoga
NY 86	26.65	42.89	1930	—	Jay, Wilmington, Lake Placid, Ray Brook, Saranac Lake, North Elba
NY 86A	11.48	18.48	1930	mid-1950s	Lake Placid, North Elba, Keene
NY 185	3.93	6.32	2008	—	Crown Point
NY 192	0.53	0.85	1930	1988	Saint Armand
NY 195	8.38	13.49	1930	mid-1930s	Elizabethtown, Westport
NY 347	4.11	6.61	1930	mid-1930s	Crown Point
NY 347	1.38	2.22	mid-1930s	1950s	Ticonderoga
NY 373	3.20	5.15	1930	—	Ausable Chasm, Port Kent
NY 427	14.27	22.97	1930	1940s	Keene
NY 431	7.96	12.81	1935	—	Wilmington, North Pole, Whiteface Mountain
NY 910K	0.72	1.16	—	—	North Hudson
NY 910M	0.81	1.30	—	—	North Elba
NY 912T	0.12	0.19	—	—	Chesterfield
NY 913Q	0.74	1.19	—	—	North Elba
NY 915F	0.34	0.55	—	—	Chesterfield
NY 915K	0.19	0.31	by 2009	—	Chesterfield

== List of county routes ==
County routes in Essex County are signed with the Manual on Uniform Traffic Control Devices-standard yellow-on-blue pentagon route marker.

Route	Length (mi)	Length (km)	From	Via	To	Notes
CR 2	9.86	15.87	NY 74 in Ticonderoga	Corduroy and Creek roads	NY 9N / NY 22 / CR 45 in Crown Point	
CR 3	2.14	3.44	Warren County line	Black Point Road in Ticonderoga	South of Colonial Street	
CR 4 (1)	15.21	24.48	US 9 in North Hudson	Caza Turn, Ensign Pond, and Dugway roads and Broad Street	Port Henry village line in Moriah	
CR 4 (2)	0.16	0.26	CR 4 (segment 1)	Caza Turn Road in North Hudson	US 9	
CR 5	2.86	4.60	CR 77	Baldwin Road in Ticonderoga	Dead end	
CR 6	8.06	12.97	US 9 in North Hudson	Tracy and Power House roads	CR 79 in Moriah	
CR 6A	2.88	4.63	CR 70	Silver Hill Road in Moriah	CR 70	
CR 7	26.23	42.21	NY 9N / NY 22 in Ticonderoga	Vineyard, Bradford Hill, White Church, Moriah, Center, Plank, Fisher Hill, and Lincoln Pond roads	NY 9N in Elizabethtown	
CR 7B	1.46	2.35	CR 7	Bartlett Pond Road in Moriah	Dead end	
CR 8	7.16	11.52	US 9 in Elizabethtown	Elizabethtown–Wadhams Road	NY 22 in Westport	
CR 10	12.11	19.49	Cross Street in Elizabethtown	Fox Run and Lewis-Wadhams roads	NY 22 in Westport	
CR 10A	1.09	1.75	NY 9N	Water Street in Elizabethtown	US 9 / NY 9N	
CR 11	0.41	0.66	Warren County line (becomes CR 21A)	Trout Brook Road in Ticonderoga	NY 9N	
CR 12	11.49	18.49	Seventy Road in Lewis	Wells Hill Road, Stowersville Road, and Jersey Street	NY 22 in Essex	Formerly had two discontinuous segments; the western segment was redesignated CR 83
CR 13	6.17	9.93	NY 9N	Hurricane Road in Keene	NY 9N / NY 73	
CR 14	3.68	5.92	US 9 in Lewis	Deerhead Road	CR 57 in Willsboro	
CR 15	2.66	4.28	Dead end at Augur Lake	Augur Lake Road in Chesterfield	US 9 / NY 22	
CR 16	3.06	4.92	Keeseville village line	Clinton Street and Port Douglas Road in Chesterfield	Colear Bay Road at Lake Champlain	
CR 17	2.08	3.35	Keeseville village line	Soper Road in Chesterfield	NY 373	
CR 18	5.87	9.45	NY 3	River Road in St. Armand	Franklin County line (becomes CR 48)	
CR 19	3.75	6.04	NY 86 / NY 431	Bonnie View Road in Wilmington	Clinton County line	
CR 20	0.99	1.59	Franklin County line	Trudeau Road in St. Armand	NY 3	
CR 21	4.06	6.53	NY 73	River Road in North Elba	NY 86	Designated as the "10th Mountain Division Memorial Trail"
CR 23	3.70	5.95	Dead end	Averyville Lane in North Elba	CR 35	
CR 24	12.82	20.63	CR 30 in Minerva	Irishtown and Hoffman roads	US 9 in Schroon	
CR 25	9.86	15.87	CR 84	Tahawus and Upper Works roads in Newcomb	Dead end	
CR 26	2.53	4.07	Dead end near Heaven Hill	Bear Cub Lane in North Elba	CR 35	
CR 26A			—	Newman Road in North Elba	—	
CR 27	4.95	7.97	CR 62	Farrell and Point roads in Willsboro	Sabousin Drive	
CR 28	6.24	10.04	NY 22	Highlands Road in Chesterfield	CR 16	
CR 29	2.86	4.60	NY 28N	Olmstedville Road in Minerva	Warren County line (becomes CR 19)	
CR 29A	0.53	0.85	CR 30	Donnelly Road in Minerva	CR 29	
CR 30	3.96	6.37	Warren County line	Church Road and Morse Memorial Highway in Minerva	NY 28N	
CR 31	1.48	2.38	NY 86	Whiteface Inn Lane in North Elba	Dead end	
CR 32	1.62	2.61	NY 86	Raybrook Road in North Elba	NY 86	
CR 33	2.31	3.72	NY 86	McKenzie Pond Road in North Elba	Saranac Lake village line	
CR 34	6.63	10.67	CR 29 in Minerva	Trout Brook Road	CR 24 in Schroon	Also known as CR 24B
CR 35	3.66	5.89	NY 86	Old Military Road in North Elba	NY 73	
CR 36	0.54	0.87	NY 28N	Wilson Road in Minerva	CR 30	
CR 37	3.64	5.86	Bennett Road	14th, Town Shed, Longs Hill, and O'Neil roads in Minerva	CR 24	
CR 38	0.95	1.53	Warren County line (becomes CR 21A)	New Hague Road in Ticonderoga	Warren County line (becomes CR 21A)	
CR 39	3.17	5.10	NY 74	Putts Pond Road in Ticonderoga	Dead end	
CR 40	1.10	1.77	NY 73	Alstead Hill Lane in Keene	Bartlett Road	
CR 41	0.69	1.11	Washington County line (becomes CR 2)	Lower Road in Ticonderoga	NY 22	
CR 42	3.97	6.39	CR 4	Windy Hill and Tarbell Hill roads in Moriah	CR 4	
CR 43	4.17	6.71	NY 9N / NY 22	Shore–Airport Road in Ticonderoga	NY 22 / NY 74	
CR 44	5.61	9.03	NY 9N in Moriah	Stevenson Road	Washington Street in Westport	
CR 45	1.36	2.19	NY 9N / NY 22	Sugar Hill Road in Crown Point	NY 9N / NY 22 / CR 2	
CR 46	2.04	3.28	CR 2	Factoryville Road in Crown Point	NY 9N / NY 22	
CR 47	4.09	6.58	CR 2	Amy Hill Road and Pearl Street in Crown Point	CR 2	
CR 48 (1)	3.40	5.47	CR 56	Old Chilson Road in Ticonderoga	NY 9N	
CR 48 (2)	3.44	5.54	NY 9N / NY 22	Lake Road in Crown Point	NY 185	
CR 49	2.86	4.60	CR 43	Delano Road in Ticonderoga	NY 22 / NY 74	
CR 50	2.87	4.62	CR 7	Russell Street in Crown Point	NY 9N / NY 22	
CR 51	0.96	1.54	NY 73	Gilmore Hill Road in Keene	NY 73	
CR 52	2.00	3.22	NY 9N	Styles Brook Road in Keene	Upland Meadows Road	
CR 53	1.26	2.03	CR 10	Cutting Road in Lewis	US 9	
CR 54	3.21	5.17	CR 7	Pilfershire Road in Moriah	NY 9N / NY 22	
CR 55	6.98	11.23	CR 10	Sayre, Walker, and Whallons Bay roads in Essex	CR 80	Also known as CR 22K; discontinuous at the Boquet River
CR 56	2.22	3.57	NY 74	Middle Chilson Road in Ticonderoga	NY 74	
CR 57	1.47	2.37	CR 12 in Essex	Reber Road	CR 14 in Willsboro	
CR 58	2.81	4.52	CR 83	Valley Road in Jay	CR 82	
CR 59	2.61	4.20	NY 9N	Youngs Road in Westport	CR 8	
CR 60	1.92	3.09	NY 9N	Sam Spear Road in Westport	NY 22	
CR 61	0.26	0.42	CR 14	Maple Street in Willsboro	NY 22	
CR 62	2.07	3.33	NY 22	Farrell Road in Willsboro	CR 27	Also known as CR 27B
CR 63	0.88	1.42	NY 86	Fox Farm Road in Wilmington	CR 83	
CR 64	5.88	9.46	CR 83	Randys Lane and Stickney Bridge Road in Jay	NY 9N	
CR 65	2.55	4.10	CR 64	Sheldrake Road in Jay	NY 9N	
CR 66	6.11	9.83	CR 55 in Essex	Middle Road	NY 22 in Willsboro	Also known as CR 22M
CR 67	1.67	2.69	NY 915F near I-87 exit 27	Old Schroon Road in Schroon	US 9	
CR 68	6.12	9.85	CR 57	Sunset Drive in Willsboro	CR 66	
CR 69	2.46	3.96	NY 73	Hulls Falls Road in Keene	NY 73	
CR 70	3.76	6.05	CR 7	Witherbee and Dalton Hill roads in Moriah	CR 7	
CR 71	5.55	8.93	US 9 / NY 22	Mace Chasm and Old Chasm roads in Chesterfield	NY 373	
CR 72	4.40	7.08	Franklin County line in St. Armand (becomes CR 48)	Gillespie Drive	NY 431 in Wilmington	Also known as CR 18A
CR 75	0.39	0.63	NY 28N	Eaton Lane in Newcomb	CR 84	
CR 76	0.83	1.34	CR 25	Tahawus Road in Newcomb	End of county maintenance	
CR 77	1.33	2.14	NY 9N	Alexandria Avenue in Ticonderoga	Lake George Avenue	
CR 78	3.31	5.33	US 9	Johnson Pond Road in North Hudson	Schroon town line	
CR 79	0.97	1.56	CR 70	Raymond Wright Way in Moriah	CR 7	
CR 80	10.32	16.61	NY 22 in Westport	Lake Shore Road and Main Street	NY 22 in Essex	Also known as CR 22J
CR 81	0.51	0.82	Franklin County line (becomes CR 55)	St. Regis Street in St. Armand	NY 3	Formerly part of NY 192
CR 82	4.12	6.63	CR 85	Glen Road in Jay	NY 9N	
CR 83	11.03	17.75	NY 9N in Jay	Jay Mountain, Trumbulls, Springfield, and Haselton roads	Clinton County line in Jay	
CR 84	18.56	29.87	NY 28N in Newcomb	Blue Ridge Road	I-87 in North Hudson (becomes NY 910K)	Also known as CR 2B
CR 85	2.58	4.15	NY 9N	Trumbulls Road in Jay	CR 82	
CR 86A	1.19	1.92	NY 73	Ausable Road in Keene	NY 73	Old alignment of former NY 86A; not signed
CR 86B	0.67	1.08	NY 73	Adirondack and Market streets in Keene Valley	NY 73	Old alignment of former NY 86A; not signed
CR 86C	0.33	0.53	NY 73	Cemetery Lane in Keene Valley	NY 73	Old alignment of former NY 86A; not signed
CR 86D	0.81	1.30	NY 73	Airport Lane in Keene Valley	NY 73	Old alignment of former NY 86A; not signed
CR 86E	0.33	0.53	NY 73	Saint Huberts Road in Keene	NY 73	Old alignment of former NY 86A; not signed
CR 88 (1)	4.48	7.21	CR 57	Mountain View Drive in Willsboro	NY 22	
CR 88 (2)	0.25	0.40	CR 88 (segment 1)	Maple Street in Willsboro	NY 22	

== See also ==
- County routes in New York
