= List of A25 roads =

This is a list of roads designated A25. Road entries are sorted in alphabetical order of country.

- Barton Highway A25 (Australia), a road connecting Canberra and Yass
- A25 motorway (Austria), a road connecting Ansfelden and the A1 to Wels and the A8
- A25 road (Belgium), a motorway
- Quebec Autoroute 25 (Canada), a road connecting Longueuil and Saint-Esprit via Montreal
- A25 road (England), a road connecting Guildford, Surrey and Maidstone, Kent
- A25 autoroute (France), a road connecting Dunkerque and Lille
- A 25 motorway (Germany), a road connecting Hamburg and Geesthacht
- A25 road (Isle of Man), a road connecting Douglas and Ballasalla
- autostrada A25 (Italy), a road connecting Rome and Pescara
- A25 road (Northern Ireland), a road connecting Strangford and Castleblayney
- A25 motorway (Portugal), a road connecting Aveiro and Vilar Formoso
- A 25 road (Sri Lanka), a road connecting Siyabalanduwa and Ampara

== See also ==
- list of highways numbered 25
