= Blue Ridge Road =

Highway in New York

Blue Ridge Road
- New York State Route 910K
- Map of Essex County with Essex CR 84 highlighted in red and NY 910K in blue

Route information
- Maintained by NYSDOT and Essex County
- Length: 19.28 mi (31.03 km)

Major junctions
- West end: NY 28N in Newcomb
- East end: US 9 in North Hudson

Location
- Country: United States
- State: New York
- County: Essex

Highway system
- County routes in New York; County Routes in Essex County

Blue Ridge Road is a 19.2-mile (30.9 km) long roadway in Essex County, New York, in the United States. The road is designated as County Route 84 (CR 84) from NY 28N in Newcomb to Interstate 87 (I-87) in North Hudson, and as New York State Route 910K (NY 910K) between I-87 and U.S. Route 9 (US 9) in North Hudson. The CR 84 portion is an 18-mile (29 km), two-lane stretch of rural highway maintained by the Essex County Department of Public Works' Highway Division while NY 910K is a 1 mile (1.6 km) highway maintained by the New York State Department of Transportation (NYSDOT). All of Blue Ridge Road has been designated as the "Blue Ridge Road Scenic Byway" by NYSDOT.

Blue Ridge Road was designated as part of NY 73 in the 1930 renumbering of state routes in New York. NY 73 was truncated to Schroon in the mid-1930s.

== Route description ==
Blue Ridge Road consists of Essex County's CR 84, which composes the bulk of the route, and NY 910K, which is a short, state-maintained roadway connecting I-87 to US 9. The entirety of Blue Ridge Road is designated as the "Blue Ridge Road Scenic Byway", a New York State Scenic Byway, by NYSDOT.

=== County Route 84 ===
Blue Ridge Road begins at an intersection with NY 28N and CR 75 (Eaton Lane) in the area south of Tahawus (pronounced "ta-hawz"). The road heads to the northeast, initially paralleling the Hudson River, then intersects with CR 25 (Tahawus Road), which heads north to the hamlet of Tahawus. After that, the route diverges from the Hudson River, turning to the southeast and climbing slightly to the side of Pine Hill, before progressing downhill. At the base of the mountain, CR 84 crosses over Vanderwhacker Brook, which flows into nearby Vanderwhacker Pond. The road winds its way around several different mountain peaks, passing to the north of Cheney Pond.

After passing through the hamlet of Boreas River, CR 84 briefly follows Wolf Pond Brook, which eventually turns north for nearby Wolf Pond. The road continues eastward past Sand Pond and begins to descend, roughly following Sand Pond Brook. It passes along the base of Ragged Mountain, a peak in the Adirondacks, after which the road runs along the edge of the valley of the stream known as "The Branch." At the base of Three Brothers Mountain, CR 84 curves northeast before making a turn to the southeast, soon entering the hamlet of Blue Ridge.

With The Branch still paralleling to the south, CR 84 continues its eastward descent and eventually intersects with its first road in several miles, Lazy Street, which provides access to the creek. At the base of Nippletop Mountain, Blue Ridge Road passes along the north shore of Palmer Pond, a small pond visible from the Adirondack Northway (I-87). Soon after, Blue Ridge Road intersects with the ramps leading to and from the Northway and the county-maintained portion of Blue Ridge Road ends.

=== NY 910K ===
The eastern end of Blue Ridge Road, beginning at the ramps to and from the Adirondack Northway, is maintained by NYSDOT as NY 910K. The route heads eastward from the Northway ramps to nearby US 9. On this 0.72-mile (1.16 km) stretch, there is one intermediate intersection, this being with an unnamed roadway. The route ends at US 9 in the hamlet of North Hudson.

== History ==
The entirety of Blue Ridge Road was designated as the westernmost portion of NY 73 in the 1930 renumbering of state highways in New York. NY 73 initially ran from NY 28N east to an intersection with US 9 in North Hudson, where NY 73 turned south to follow US 9 toward Schroon. The route was truncated c. 1936 to begin at US 9 in Schroon. NY 73's former alignment along Blue Ridge Road was redesignated as CR 2B by 1969. The section between the Northway and US 9 was later transferred to the state and assigned the NY 910K designation. On May 21, 2009, New York Governor David Paterson announced that stimulus money from the American Recovery and Reinvestment Act would be used to reconstruct the CR 84 segment of the Blue Ridge Road, seeing it as a major connector from NY 28N to I-87.

== Major intersections ==
The entire route is in Essex County.

Location	mi	km	Destinations	Notes
Newcomb	0.00	0.00	NY 28N – Newcomb, Minerva	
North Hudson	18.56	29.87	I-87	Exit 29 on I-87 / Northway
North Hudson	19.28	31.03	US 9 – North Hudson, Port Henry, Schroon Lake (hamlet)	
1.000 mi = 1.609 km; 1.000 km = 0.621 mi

== See also ==
- State Route 74 (New York–Vermont), part of which was also formerly NY 73
