= List of highways numbered 25 =

The following highways are numbered 25:

== International ==
- AH25 Asian Highway 25
- E25 European route E25
- Arab Mashreq Road 25

== Argentina ==
- National Route 25

== Australia ==
- Barton Highway (A25) ( – Under Construction)
- Palmerston Highway (State Route 25) – (Queensland)
- – King Island (Tasmania)

== Austria ==
- Welser Autobahn

== Canada ==
- Alberta Highway 25
- Manitoba Highway 25
- Ontario Highway 25 (former)
- Prince Edward Island Route 25
- Quebec Autoroute 25
- Saskatchewan Highway 25

== China ==
- G25 Expressway

== Colombia ==
- National Route 25

== Cuba ==
- Highway 2–25

== Czech Republic ==
- I/25 Highway; Czech: Silnice I/25

== Finland ==
- Finnish national road 25

== Germany ==
- Bundesautobahn 25

== Greece ==
- A25 motorway
- EO25 road

== Iceland ==
- Route 25 (Iceland)

== India ==
- NH 25

== Ireland ==
- N25 road (Ireland)

== Israel ==
- Highway 25 (Israel)

== Italy ==
- Autostrada A25

== Japan ==
- Japan National Route 25
- Meihan Expressway
- Nishi-Meihan Expressway

== Jordan ==
- Highway 25

== Korea, South ==
- Expressway 25
  - Honam Expressway
  - Nonsan–Cheonan Expressway
- National Route 25

== Malaysia ==
- Kuala Lumpur–Kuala Selangor Expressway

== Mexico ==
- Mexican Federal Highway 25

== New Zealand ==
- New Zealand State Highway 25
  - New Zealand State Highway 25A

== Portugal ==
- A25 motorway (Portugal)

== Romania ==
- Drumul Național 25 (DN25)

== United Kingdom ==
- British A25 (Addington-Guilford)
- M25 (London Circular)
- A25 road (Northern Ireland)

== United States ==
- Interstate 25
- U.S. Route 25
  - U.S. Route 25W
  - U.S. Route 25E
- New England Route 25 (former)
- Alabama State Route 25
  - County Route 25 (Lee County, Alabama)
- Arkansas Highway 25
- California State Route 25
  - County Route A25 (California)
  - County Route J25 (California)
  - County Route S25 (California)
- Colorado State Highway 25 (former)
- Connecticut Route 25
- Florida State Road 25
  - County Road 25 (Lake County, Florida)
  - County Road 25 (Marion County, Florida)
- Georgia State Route 25
- Idaho State Highway 25
- Illinois Route 25
- Indiana State Road 25
- Iowa Highway 25
- K-25 (Kansas highway)
- Louisiana Highway 25
- Maine State Route 25
- Maryland Route 25
- Massachusetts Route 25
- M-25 (Michigan highway)
- Minnesota State Highway 25
  - County Road 25 (Hennepin County, Minnesota)
  - County Road 25 (Ramsey County, Minnesota)
  - County Road 25 (Washington County, Minnesota)
- Mississippi Highway 25
- Missouri Route 25
- Montana Highway 25
- Nebraska Highway 25
- Nevada State Route 25 (former)
- New Hampshire Route 25
- New Jersey Route 25 (former)
  - County Route 25 (Monmouth County, New Jersey)
- New York State Route 25
  - County Route 25 (Allegany County, New York)
  - County Route 25 (Cattaraugus County, New York)
  - County Route 25 (Chenango County, New York)
  - County Route 25 (Columbia County, New York)
  - County Route 25 (Essex County, New York)
  - County Route 25 (Genesee County, New York)
  - County Route 25 (Jefferson County, New York)
  - County Route 25 (Nassau County, New York)
  - County Route 25 (Niagara County, New York)
  - County Route 25 (Oneida County, New York)
  - County Route 25 (Onondaga County, New York)
  - County Route 25 (Ontario County, New York)
  - County Route 25 (Oswego County, New York)
  - County Route 25 (Otsego County, New York)
  - County Route 25 (Schoharie County, New York)
  - County Route 25 (Suffolk County, New York)
  - County Route 25 (Sullivan County, New York)
  - County Route 25 (Tioga County, New York)
  - County Route 25 (Ulster County, New York)
  - County Route 25 (Washington County, New York)
  - County Route 25 (Westchester County, New York)
  - County Route 25 (Yates County, New York)
- North Carolina Highway 25 (former)
- North Dakota Highway 25
- Ohio State Route 25
- Oklahoma State Highway 25
- Redwood Highway No. 25 in Oregon
- Pennsylvania Route 25
- South Carolina Highway 25 (former)
- South Dakota Highway 25
- Tennessee State Route 25
- Texas State Highway 25
  - Texas State Highway Loop 25
  - Farm to Market Road 25 (former)
  - Texas Park Road 25
- Utah State Route 25
- Vermont Route 25
- State Route 25 (Virginia 1918-1933) (former)
- Washington State Route 25
- West Virginia Route 25
- Wisconsin Highway 25

Territories

- Puerto Rico Highway 25
  - Puerto Rico Highway 25R

== See also ==
- List of A25 roads
- List of highways numbered 25A
- List of highways numbered 25B
- List of highways numbered 25C

Preceded by 24	Lists of highways	Succeeded by 26
