= New York State Route 9N =

Highway in New York

New York State Route 9N
- Map of northern New York with NY 9N highlighted in red

Route information
- Auxiliary route of US 9
- Maintained by NYSDOT and the city of Saratoga Springs
- Length: 143.49 mi (230.92 km)
- Existed: 1930–present

Major junctions
- South end: US 9 / NY 29 / NY 50 / NY 9P in Saratoga Springs
- I-87 / US 9 / NY 9L in Lake George; NY 8 in Hague; NY 74 in Ticonderoga; NY 22 from Ticonderoga to Westport; I-87 in Westport; NY 73 in Keene; NY 86 in Jay; I-87 in Au Sable
- North end: US 9 / NY 22 in Keeseville

Location
- Country: United States
- State: New York
- Counties: Saratoga, Warren, Essex, Clinton

Highway system
- New York Highways; Interstate; US; State; Reference; Parkways
← NY 9M	→ NY 9P
← NY 9J	NY 9K	→ NY 9L

New York State Route 9N (NY 9N) is a north–south state highway in northeastern New York in the United States. It extends from an intersection with U.S. Route 9 (US 9), NY 29, and NY 50 in the city of Saratoga Springs to a junction with US 9 and NY 22 in the Clinton County hamlet of Keeseville. At 143.49 miles (230.92 km) in total length, NY 9N is the longest letter-suffixed route in the state. It is concurrent with its parent route for 1 mile (1.6 km) in the village of Lake George and for three blocks in the hamlet of Elizabethtown.

Much of NY 9N runs alongside either a river or a lake. It follows the Hudson River through northern Saratoga County and southern Warren County, the entirety of Lake George's western shoreline, the west edge of Lake Champlain between Ticonderoga and Westport, and the Ausable River from Keene to Keeseville. The other portions of NY 9N pass through predominantly rural and mountainous regions of the Adirondack Mountains.

The NY 9N designation was originally created as part of the 1930 renumbering of state highways in New York to replace New York State Route 9W, a route assigned to an alternate routing of US 9 from Elizabethtown to Keeseville. NY 9N was extended southward to Lake George in March 1936 and to Saratoga Springs in the early 1950s, supplanting several other routes (including New York State Route 9K) in the process.

== Route description ==
NY 9N is the longest suffixed route in the state, extending for 143.5 miles (230.9 km) from Saratoga Springs to Keeseville. The route stretches through four counties—Saratoga, Warren, Essex and Clinton—and serves several villages and hamlets, including Lake George, Ticonderoga, and Elizabethtown. It overlaps its parent route, US 9, in Lake George and Elizabethtown and meets Interstate 87 (I-87) four times.

=== Saratoga County ===
NY 9N begins at the intersection of Church Street, and VanDam Street in the city of Saratoga Springs. Situated on the northwestern corner of the junction is the city's post office. The route heads west, following Church Street out of the city's center. At Bensonhurst Avenue, ownership and maintenance of NY 9N shifts from the city of Saratoga Springs to the New York State Department of Transportation. As NY 9N exits the city limits and enters the town of Greenfield, it turns to follow a more northerly routing. It meets County Route 21 (CR 21) just north of the town line, where the Church Street name ends, and CR 36 (Wilton Road) 2.5 miles (4.0 km) to the north in the hamlet of Greenfield Center.

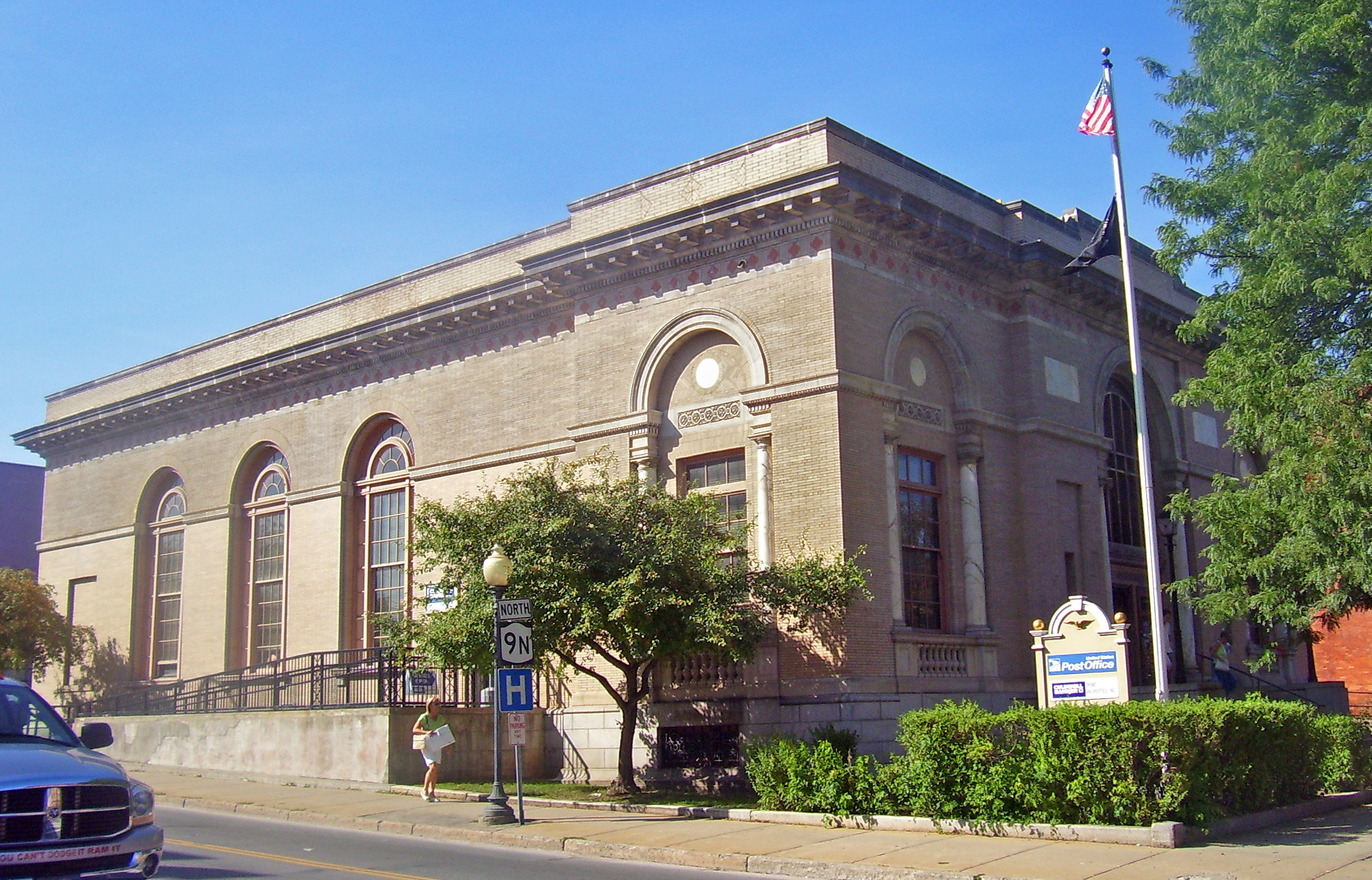
Saratoga Springs post office and first reassurance shield at NY 9N's southern terminus

The route continues on into the town of Corinth, where it crosses the Blue Line into Adirondack Park. Not far to the north, NY 9N enters the village of Corinth, situated on the west bank of the Hudson River. The highway follows Saratoga Avenue and Maple Streets into the village center, where it turns north and exits the village on Main Street. NY 9N follows the western edge of the river north for roughly 4 miles (6 km) through the towns of Corinth and Hadley before crossing over it and passing from Saratoga County to Warren County.

=== Warren County ===
Across the county line in Lake Luzerne, NY 9N begins to deviate from the Hudson River, gradually curving to the northeast as it passes through the hamlets of Lake Luzerne, Fourth Lake, and Lake Vanare, all of which are named for small lakes bearing those names near the center of the communities. Just northeast of Lake Vanare, NY 9N enters the town of Lake George, where it connects to I-87 (the Adirondack Northway) at exit 21 and meets US 9. Here, it joins its parent route northward toward the village of Lake George. The conjoined routes intersect the northern end of NY 9L just south of the village line before becoming Canada Street and entering the village limits upon crossing over West Brook. US 9 and NY 9N serve as the primary north–south thoroughfare through the village before splitting at the north end of the village. While US 9 continues to the north, NY 9N heads northeast along the western edge of Lake George.

The portion of NY 9N between Lake George village and Hague is relatively isolated, with mountains lining the western edge of the highway and the lakeshore located to the immediate east. Along this stretch, NY 9N serves numerous lakeside hamlets, the southernmost of which is Diamond Point, a community just south of the Lake George–Bolton town line. The route continues on, passing through the hamlets of Bolton and Bolton Landing, the latter of which is home to The Sagamore, a resort situated on an island in Lake George.

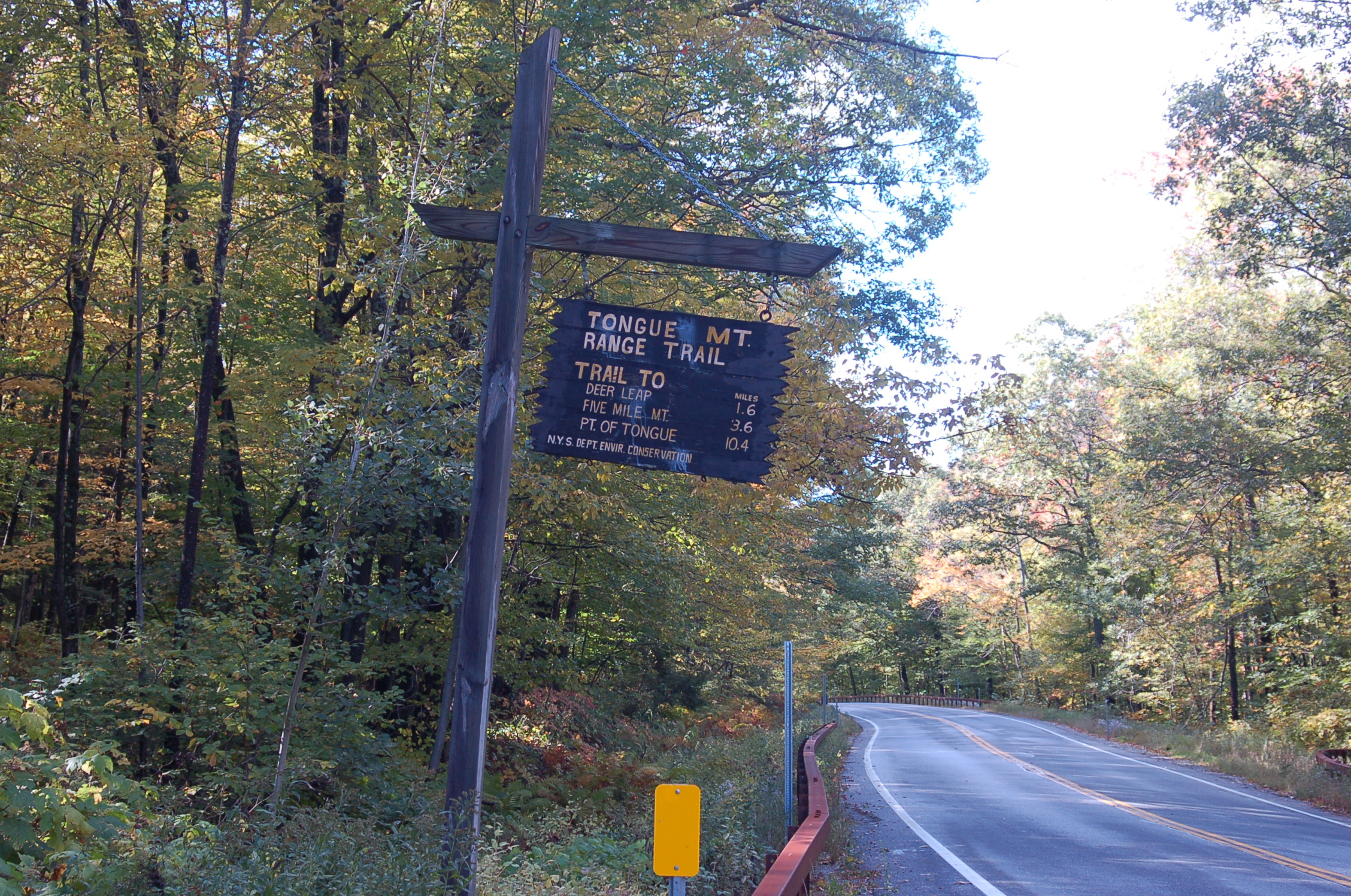
View of NY 9N from the North End Trailhead in Bolton.

North of Bolton Landing, the route leaves the main lake and instead follows the edge of Northwest Bay, an inlet separated from Lake George itself by a large, mountainous peninsula. The bay abruptly ends about 2 miles (3.2 km) to the north, at which point NY 9N curves to the east and proceeds through a pass in the mountains to rejoin the western edge of Lake George at Sabbath Day Point in the town of Hague. Here, the route turns back to the north and follows Lake George to the hamlet of Hague, where it meets the northern (signed as the eastern) terminus of NY 8. NY 9N continues to serve as the lakeside roadway for another 3 miles (5 km) before curving away from the lake and entering Essex County.

=== Essex and Clinton counties ===
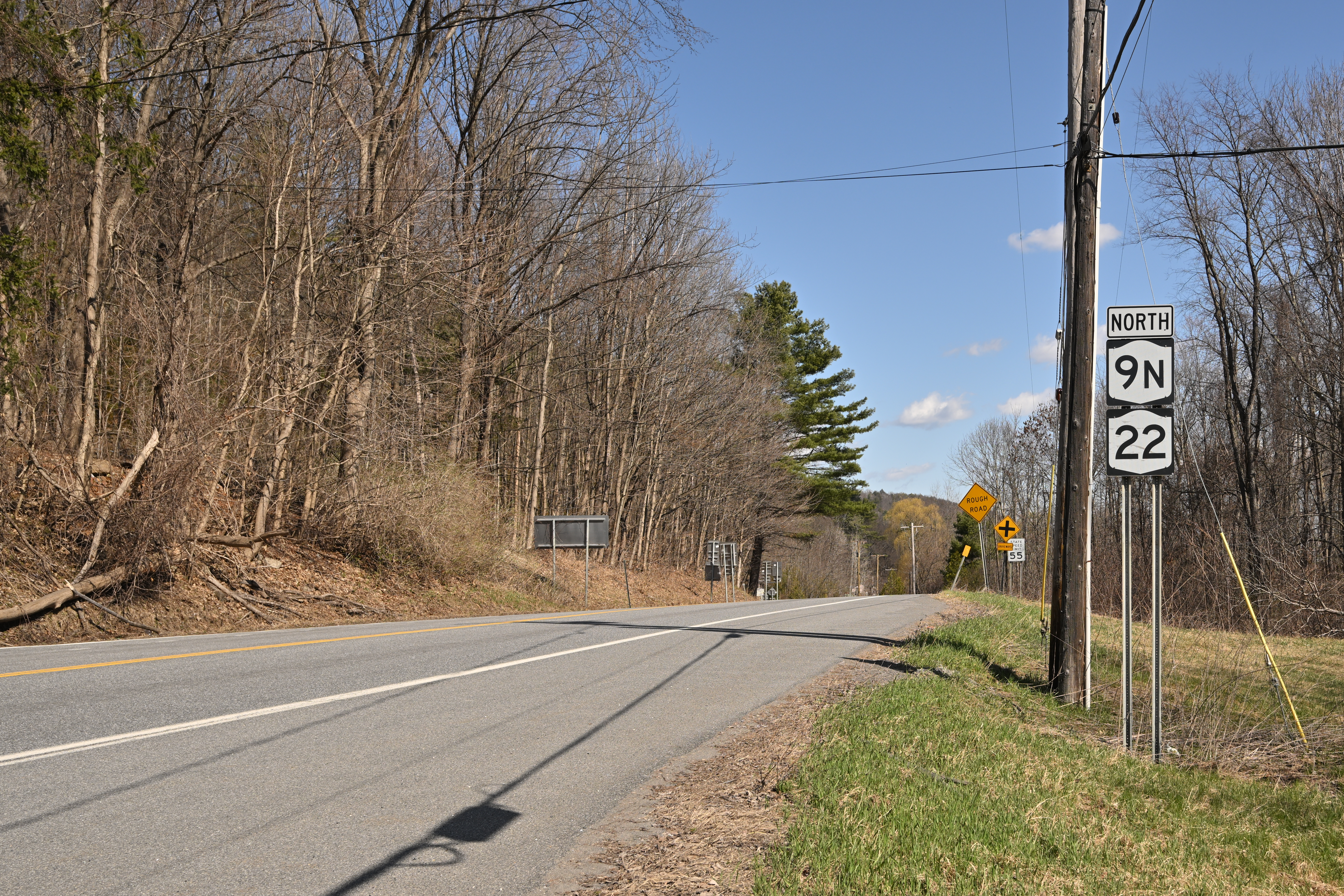
Looking north on NY-9N/NY-22, Essex County

Now in the town of Ticonderoga, NY 9N passes through a valley before curving to the east and entering the hamlet of Ticonderoga. For the most part, NY 9N bypasses the community as it turns north onto Wicker Street, the westernmost north–south through street in the hamlet. Northwest of the former village's center, NY 9N meets NY 22 and NY 74, the latter of which serves as a northerly bypass of Ticonderoga. NY 22 joins NY 9N here, following the route out of the hamlet.

NY 9N and NY 22 head generally northward through an area of lowlands, which eventually give way to Lake Champlain as the conjoined routes pass into the town of Crown Point. Once again, NY 9N serves as the lakeside highway as it follows the western edge of the lake through the hamlet of Crown Point to the peninsula that gives the town its name. While NY 9N and NY 22 pass by Crown Point to the west, NY 185 directly serves the peninsula and the Crown Point State Historic Site, located at its tip.

The routes continue northward along the lakeshore through the town of Moriah and the village of Port Henry to the town of Westport, where NY 9N and NY 22 split in the hamlet of Westport. While NY 22 continues north towards Essex, NY 9N heads west to follow a more inland routing through a series of narrow valleys. NY 9N intersects I-87 once again at exit 31 just before entering the town of Elizabethtown. The route continues west, passing over the Bouquet River and entering the hamlet of Elizabethtown, where it rejoins US 9 in the former village's center. Unlike the overlap in Lake George, this concurrency lasts for only three blocks before the two routes split.

NY 9N continues to the west for 12 miles (19 km) through deep, narrow valleys to Keene, where it meets NY 73 north of Keene Valley. Here, NY 9N turns north, joining NY 73 for 2 miles (3.2 km) to the hamlet of Keene, located on the east branch of the Ausable River. NY 73 heads off to the west from this point toward Lake Placid; however, NY 9N follows the river northward into the town of Jay, where it intersects the east end of NY 86. The highway continues alongside the western bank of the river branch to the hamlet of Au Sable Forks, situated on the Essex–Clinton County line and at the point where the Ausable River's east and west branches come together.

The highway enters Au Sable Forks from the south on South Main Street and becomes North Main Street upon crossing the west branch of the river and entering Clinton County and the town of Black Brook. NY 9N immediately turns east upon crossing the river, following Ausable Street out of the hamlet and along the northern edge of the Ausable River into the town of Au Sable. Here, NY 9N meets I-87 one final time at exit 34 just southwest of the village of Keeseville. NY 9N continues on into Keeseville, where it meets NY 22 once again at an intersection across the river from the village center. NY 22 and NY 9N come together once more, overlapping for 0.25 miles (0.40 km) to an intersection with US 9 a short distance downstream from the center of Keeseville. NY 9N comes to an end here while NY 22 turns south onto US 9.

== History ==
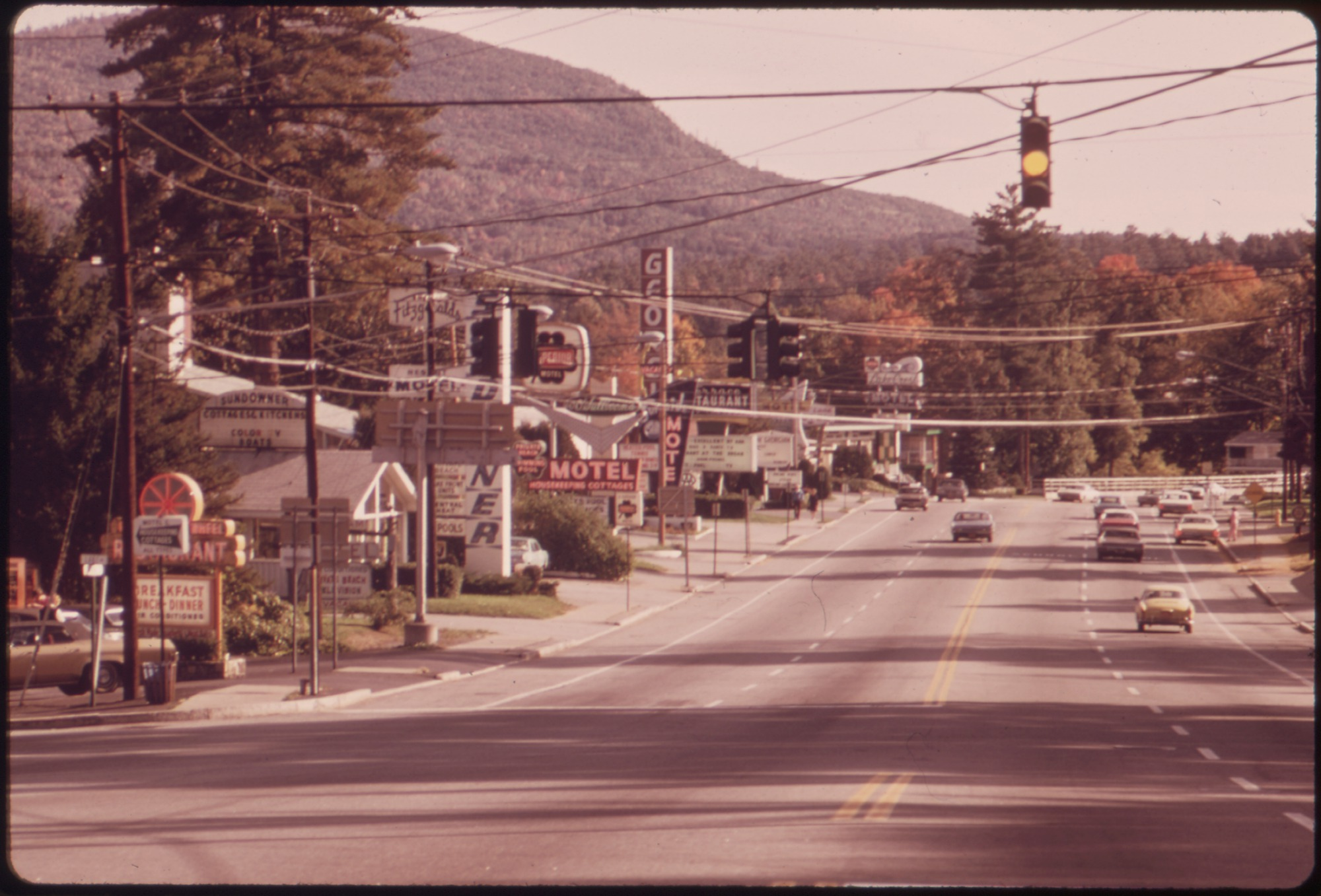
NY 9N and US 9 facing towards Lake George Village in 1973

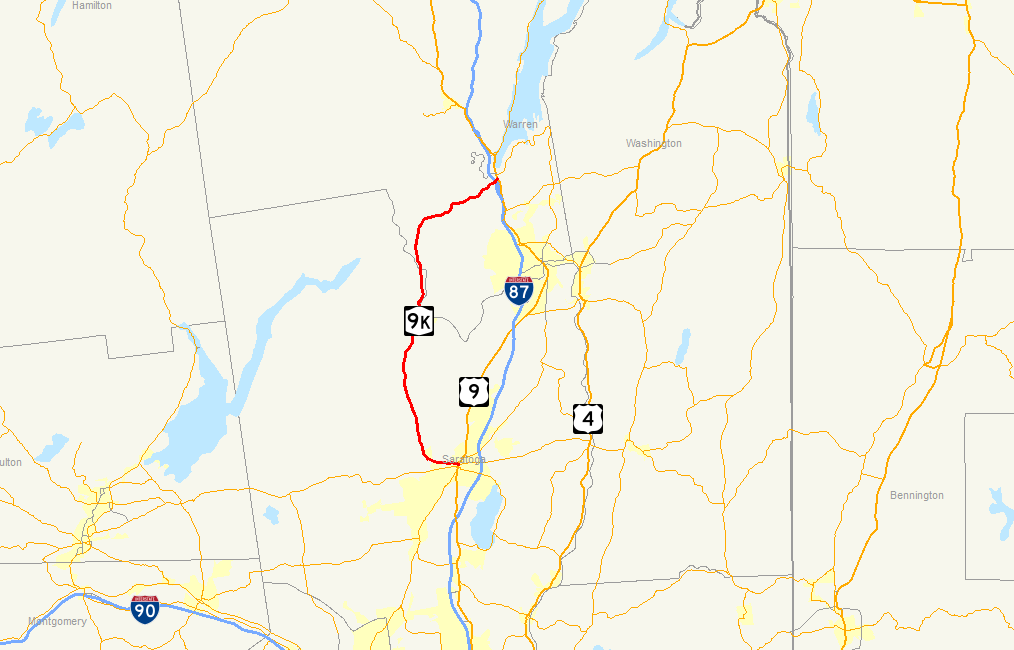
Map of the area surrounding Glens Falls and Saratoga Springs, with former NY 9K highlighted in red

In 1908, the New York State Legislature created Route 22, an unsigned legislative route that was initially split into two segments. The northern half of the route ran from Riparius to Rouses Point and mostly followed what is now US 9 between the two locations. From Elizabethtown to Keeseville, however, Route 22 followed a more westerly alignment via Keene, Jay, and Au Sable Forks. When the first set of posted routes in New York were assigned in 1924, all of legislative Route 22 north of Riparius became part of NY 6, which continued south toward Glens Falls on what is now US 9. At the same time, the section of modern NY 9N between Saratoga Springs and Lake George was designated as part of NY 10. The portion between Ticonderoga and Westport became part of a realigned NY 30 by the following year.

By 1926, the piece of current NY 9N from Hague to Ticonderoga was designated as the easternmost leg of NY 47, which continued west to Chestertown on modern NY 8. In 1927, most of NY 6 north of Round Lake was replaced by US 9 when U.S. Highways were first signed in New York. The lone exception was between Elizabethtown and Keeseville, where US 9 followed a previously unnumbered highway to the east instead. The bypassed section of NY 6 between the two locations was redesignated as NY 9W at this time. NY 9W was renumbered to NY 9N as part of the 1930 renumbering of state highways in New York, eliminating the alphanumerical duplication between itself and US 9W.

NY 47, meanwhile, became part of the new NY 8 in the 1930 renumbering, allowing the NY 47 designation to be reassigned to a previously unnumbered roadway along the western shore of Lake George between NY 8 in Hague and US 9 in Lake George village. At the same time, NY 10 was realigned south of Long Lake and replaced with NY 9K from Saratoga Springs to Lake George while the roadway connecting Ticonderoga to Westport became part of NY 22 after NY 30 was reassigned elsewhere in the state. The segment of modern NY 9N from Westport to Elizabethtown, previously unnumbered, was designated NY 195.

NY 9N was extended south to Lake George in March 1936, supplanting both NY 47 and NY 195 in an effort to aid tourists. From Westport to Hague, NY 9N overlapped with NY 22 (from Westport to Ticonderoga) and NY 8 (from Crown Point to Hague). The route was extended once more in November 1953 to its current southern terminus in Saratoga Springs, replacing NY 9K and creating a short overlap with US 9 through Lake George village in the process. The overlap with NY 8 was eliminated in the mid-1960s when that route was truncated to end at its junction with NY 9N in Hague.

== Major intersections ==
County	Location	mi	km	Destinations	Notes
Saratoga	Saratoga Springs	0.00	0.00	US 9 / NY 29 / NY 50 (Broadway) to I-87	Southern terminus
Hudson River				Bridge over Hudson River	
Warren	Town of Lake George	29.49	47.46	I-87	Exit 21 on I-87
Warren	Town of Lake George	29.69	47.78	US 9 south – Glens Falls	Southern end of US 9 concurrency
Warren	Town of Lake George	30.02	48.31	NY 9L south – Dunham Bay	Northern terminus of NY 9L
Warren	Town of Lake George	30.12	48.47	Prospect Mountain Veterans Memorial Highway (NY 917A north) – Prospect Mountain	
Warren	Village of Lake George	31.57	50.81	US 9 north – Warrensburg	Northern end of US 9 concurrency
Warren	Town of Lake George	31.94	51.40	To I-87	Access via NY 912Q
Warren	Hague	59.72	96.11	NY 8 south to I-87 – Brant Lake, Chestertown	Northern terminus of NY 8
Essex	Ticonderoga	69.33	111.58	NY 22 south / NY 74 – Schroon Lake, Whitehall	Southern end of NY 22 concurrency; hamlet of Ticonderoga
Essex	Crown Point	81.64	131.39	NY 185 east to VT 17 – Champlain Bridge	Western terminus of NY 185
Essex	Town of Westport	94.81	152.58	NY 22 north (Champlain Avenue)	Northern end of NY 22 concurrency; hamlet of Westport
Essex	Town of Westport	98.90	159.16	I-87	Exit 31 on I-87
Essex	Town of Elizabethtown	103.19	166.07	US 9 north – Keeseville	Southern end of US 9 concurrency; hamlet of Elizabethtown
Essex	Town of Elizabethtown	103.65	166.81	US 9 south – Schroon Lake	Northern end of US 9 concurrency
Essex	Keene	113.74	183.05	NY 73 east – Keene Valley	Southern end of NY 73 concurrency
Essex	Keene	115.59	186.02	NY 73 west – Lake Placid	Northern end of NY 73 concurrency; hamlet of Keene
Essex	Jay	125.21	201.51	NY 86 west – Wilmington	Eastern terminus of NY 86
Ausable River (West Branch)				West Branch Ausable River Bridge	
Clinton	Au Sable	142.06	228.62	I-87 to A-15 north	Exit 34 on I-87
Clinton	Au Sable	143.22	230.49	NY 22 north – Peru	Southern end of NY 22 concurrency; hamlet of Keeseville
Clinton	Au Sable	143.49	230.92	US 9 / NY 22 south – Ausable Chasm, Ferry to Vermont, Plattsburgh, Elizabethtown	Northern terminus; northern end of NY 22 concurrency
1.000 mi = 1.609 km; 1.000 km = 0.621 mi: Concurrency terminus
