= A-25 song =

In the Royal Navy's Fleet Air Arm, form A25 was a pilot's accident report.

It features in The A25 Song, which Cyril Tawney in his book Grey Funnel Lines says probably originated in the early years of the Second World War, and describes as "the unchallenged 'anthem' of the Fleet Air Arm".

The song is sung to the tune of "The Orange Flute", with a chorus of "Cracking show, I'm alive/But I still have to render my A25".
