= New York State Route 28N =

Highway in New York

New York State Route 28N
- NY 28N highlighted in red

Route information
- Auxiliary route of NY 28
- Maintained by NYSDOT
- Length: 50.95 mi (82.00 km)
- Existed: 1930–present

Major junctions
- West end: NY 28 / NY 30 in Indian Lake
- East end: NY 28 in Johnsburg

Location
- Country: United States
- State: New York
- Counties: Hamilton, Essex, Warren

Highway system
- New York Highways; Interstate; US; State; Reference; Parkways
← NY 28B	→ NY 29

New York State Route 28N (NY 28N) is an east–west state highway in the North Country of New York in the United States. It extends for 50.95 miles (82.00 km) through the Adirondack Mountains from Blue Mountain Lake to North Creek. The route is a northerly alternate route to NY 28 between both locations; as such, it passes through several communities that NY 28 bypasses to the south. The westernmost 10 miles (16 km) of NY 28N overlap with NY 30 through the town of Long Lake. NY 28N and NY 30 split in the hamlet of Long Lake, from where NY 30 heads to the north and NY 28N proceeds eastward through mountainous regions of Adirondack Park.

The 40-mile (64 km) section of NY 28N not concurrent with NY 30 is designated as the Roosevelt–Marcy Trail, a scenic byway named for Theodore Roosevelt, who was then the Vice President of the United States. The byway marks the path Roosevelt took in 1901 to reach North Creek from Mount Marcy after learning that President William McKinley had been assassinated. The route has a rather scant history before its designations. The road originated as an old highway stretching from Warren County to Long Lake. It was used for transportation in the iron ore industry in Newcomb, and for the lumber industry in Minerva. New York State gained control of the road in 1909. The NY 28N designation was assigned as part of the 1930 renumbering of state highways in New York, incorporating part of pre-1930 NY 10.

== Route description ==
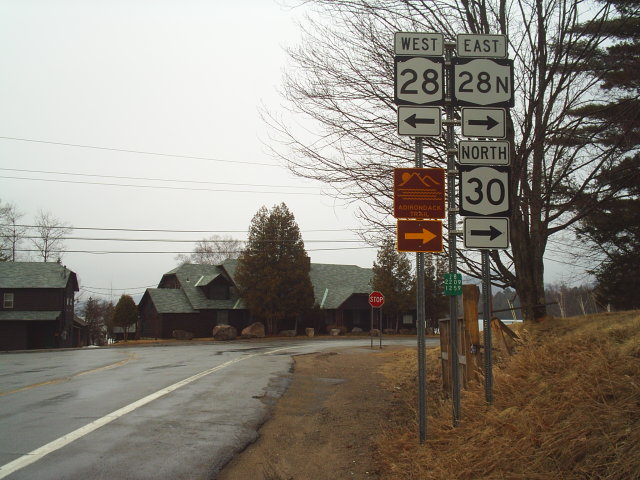
NY 28N's western terminus viewed from the intersection with NY 28 and NY 30 in Blue Mountain Lake

NY 28N begins at the intersection with NY 28 and NY 30 near the hamlet of Blue Mountain Lake within the town of Indian Lake. The highway, concurrent with Route 30, heads north through the hamlet nestled at the base of Blue Mountain, one of the highest peaks in Adirondack Park standing, 3,795 feet (1,157 m) above sea level. Routes 28N and 30 track north, gaining elevation after leaving Blue Mountain Lake. Nestled between Blue Mountain and Peaked Mountain, Routes 28N and 30 turn northeast. After intersecting Salmon Pond Road, the highways wind through the mountains and hills of the Adirondacks. Mud Pond and South Pond are on the west, and East Inlet Mountain is on the east. After paralleling Long Lake and the base of East Inlet Mountain, the highways enter the hamlet of Long Lake, where they split. Route 30 heads northwest, while NY 28N turns eastward towards Newcomb.

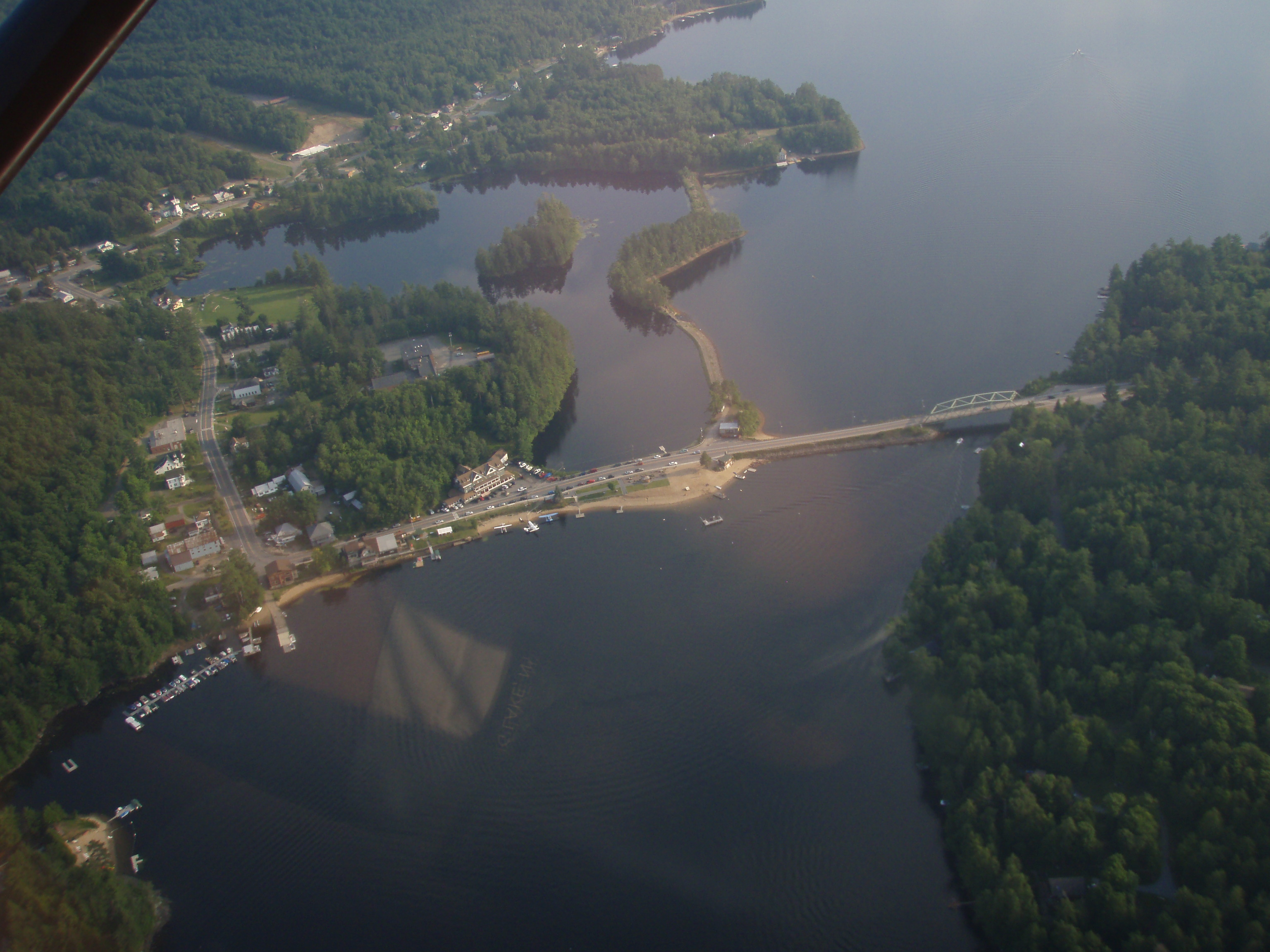
Long Lake from the air. NY 28N is visible near the patch of forests to the west.

Beyond Long Lake, NY 28N partially remains in a mountainous region; Pinnacle Mountain, a 2,159-foot (658 m) peak, rises to the north, while lowlands lie to the south. The highway progresses eastward, passing Windfall Mountain and proceeding through the center of the park. NY 28N crosses into Essex County, where it becomes the Roosevelt–Marcy Trail, one of 13 scenic byways in the Adirondack Park. The highway, first turning southeast for a short distance, turns east again, passing south of Rich Lake. The two-lane highway passes Baldwin Mountain to the north, and subsequently enters Newcomb, an isolated town between Long Lake and North Creek. The highway exits Newcomb as it approaches the shores of Harris Lake. After crossing one of those creeks, the highway turns to the southeast and into Winebrook Hills.

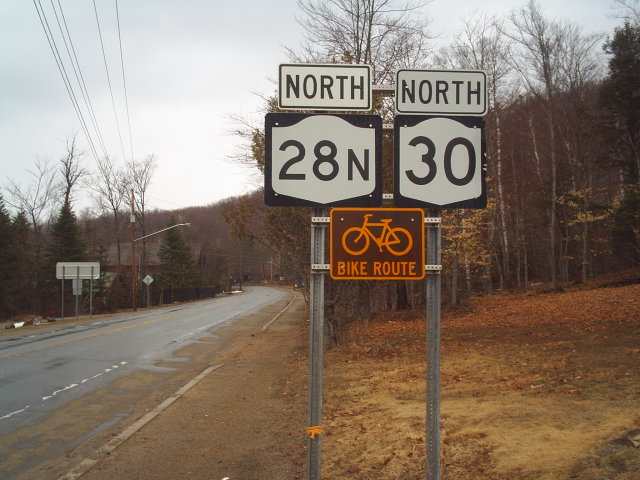
Route 28N heading northbound along Route 30 in Blue Mountain Lake

NY 28N passes through Winebrook Hills, and intersects with its first signed roads since Long Lake, County Route 75 (CR 75, named Eaton Lane) and CR 84 (Blue Ridge Road). The latter is a former alignment of NY 73. Nearby is Vanderwhacker Mountain, a 3,386-foot-high (1,032 m) peak and part of the Vanderwhacker Mountain Wild Forest, which the highway passes through. CR 84 eventually parallels the highway to the north of NY 28N, but this slowly begins to change as the main highway begins to progress southward. NY 28N heads south into the hamlet of Aiden Lair and continues south towards Warren County. The highway crosses Boreas Creek, which flows southwest in the park, and eventually passes a series of lakes. NY 28N enters Minerva, where it intersects several county routes, including County Route 29, which heads towards the Warren County border and Interstate 87 (I-87).

The road, after leaving Minerva, passes Moxham Mountain, a 2,200-foot (670 m) peak, and eventually crosses the Hudson River. The route ends just after entering North Creek in Warren County, at the intersection with NY 28, its parent route.

NY 28N is classified as a rural major collector road, with the exception of the section that is overlapped with Route 30, which is classified as a rural minor arterial road. As of 2006, the Route 30 overlap had an annual average daily traffic of 1,781 vehicles. Traffic volumes are reduced to 1,231 vehicles per day from the end of the Route 30 overlap to the intersection with Blue Ridge Road (CR 84). South of this intersection, traffic is reduced further to 350 until the hamlet of Minerva, rising to 751 south of Minerva until near the Warren county line. Traffic increases back up to 1,248 vehicles per day from there to Route 28 in North Creek.

== History ==
=== Early history: Newcomb and Minerva ===
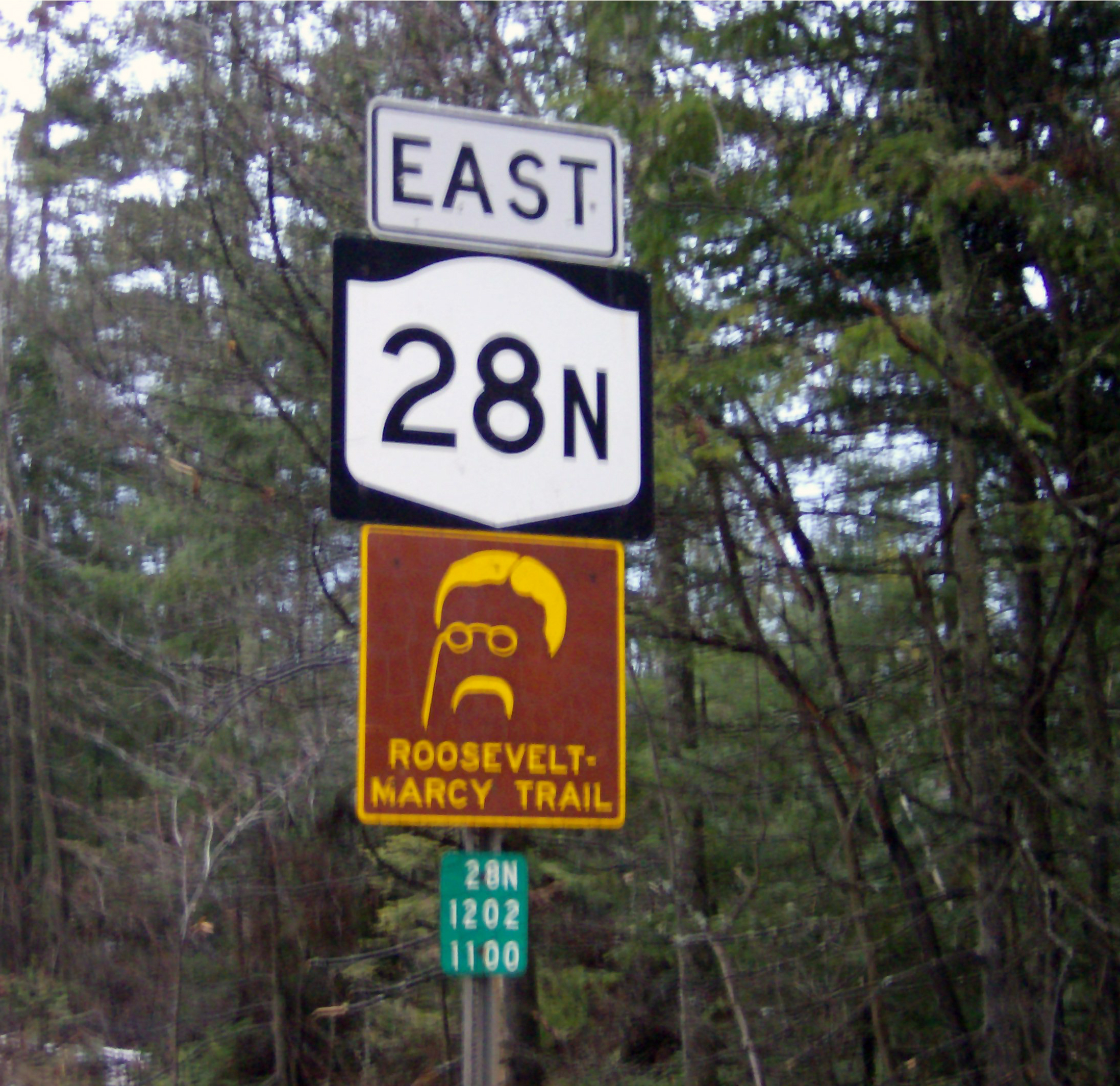
Sign for Route 28N with secondary sign for Roosevelt–Marcy Trail

Many of the earliest roads in the area crossed through Minerva. The first known road that reached the settlement was established in 1804, when land along a highway from St. Lawrence County to the town of Chester in Warren County was populated by the West family. Minerva was mainly limited to the vicinity of the old highway, but as more people settled along the road, the town began to grow. For a time, the town boasted several water-powered sawmills, and the highway was used to transport lumber. However, the lumber industry began to fail, and by 1840, the logging and lumber system had been replaced by crops. The town initiated river drives, which continued until 1950.

On March 15, 1828, part of Minerva and nearby Moriah was split into the town of Newcomb. Settlers began to arrive in this area in 1816. Settlement began along the shores of Lake Harris and Newcomb Lake, mainly along the old highway from Warren County to nearby Long Lake. Eventually, highways helped the town grow, and it reached a population of 300 by the 1880 census. The iron ore industry contributed to population growth via 30-mile (48 km) to 40-mile (64 km) roads to Lake Champlain that were meant for hauling ore. The highway from Warren County to Long Lake became part of the state system as early as 1909. After 1845, Newcomb's iron ore industry began to decline and the town evolved into somewhat of a sportsmen's resort. As a result, a road was built connecting Newcomb with nearby Minerva and Long Lake.

The 40-mile (64 km) section of 28N between Long Lake and North Creek is a scenic byway named the Roosevelt–Marcy Trail. This was the route traveled on September 10, 1901 by Theodore Roosevelt, then Vice President of the United States. The vice president had hiked to the summit of nearby Mount Marcy earlier, while there, learned that President William McKinley, having been shot four days earlier by anarchist Leon Czolgosz in Buffalo, was near death. Roosevelt took an overnight wagon ride to North Creek. From the train station there, he traveled to Buffalo, where, after McKinley died, he was sworn in as president on September 14.

=== Designation and bridge rehabilitation ===
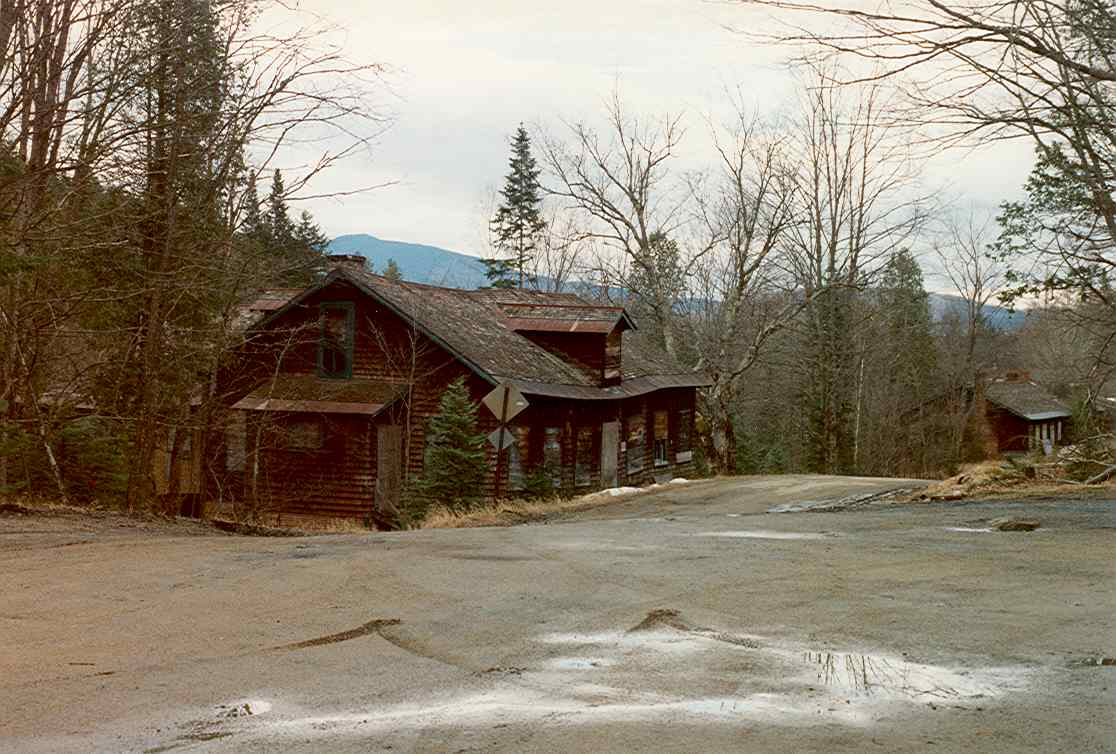
The area now of Tahawus, New York in 1994. This was a location for an intersection with NY 73

The routing of NY 28N was originally designated, but not signed, (Note: The road was given a designation, though no actual signs were erected.) as part of legislative Route 25 in 1908. In 1924, the portion of Route 25 from Long Lake to North Creek was designated as part of the signed NY 10. The segment of former Route 25 between Blue Mountain Lake and Long Lake became part of NY 10A in the late 1920s. In the 1930 renumbering, the NY 10A designation was eliminated, and NY 10 was rerouted south of Long Lake to follow the modern routing of NY 30 south to Speculator. The former routing of NY 10 between Long Lake and North Creek was then administratively redesignated as NY 28N, which continued southward from Long Lake to Blue Mountain Lake by way of an overlap with NY 10.

The New York State Department of Transportation has scheduled for NY 28N to undergo construction in spring 2013, to rehabilitate the bridge over the Upper Hudson River Railroad. The $5.9 million project is projected to be complete in fall of 2015, and is to be supported by state and federal funds. New York State Department of Transportation has also planned for NY 28N's bridge over Stillwater Brook in Minerva to be replaced with a stronger structure. The development of the project is expected to take place 2014, with bids and construction starting in 2016. The project has been set to end in 2017, and is predicted to cost $1.1 million of federal and state funds.

== Major intersections ==
County	Location	mi	km	Destinations	Notes
Hamilton	Town of Indian Lake	0.00	0.00	NY 28 / NY 30 south – Raquette Lake, Old Forge, Indian Lake	Western terminus; west end of NY 30 overlap; hamlet of Blue Mountain Lake
Hamilton	Town of Long Lake	10.61	17.08	NY 30 north – Tupper Lake, Malone	East end of NY 30 overlap; hamlet of Long Lake
Essex	Newcomb	29.52	47.51	CR 84 east (Blue Ridge Road) to I-87 – Tahawus, North Hudson	Western terminus of CR 84; former NY 73
Essex	Minerva	43.39	69.83	CR 30 (Morse Memorial Highway) – Olmstedville	
Warren	Johnsburg	50.79	81.74	CR 77 (Main Street) – North Creek Business District	Former routing of NY 28; hamlet of North Creek
Warren	Johnsburg	50.95	82.00	NY 28 – Wevertown, Indian Lake, Gore Mountain ski resort	Eastern terminus
1.000 mi = 1.609 km; 1.000 km = 0.621 mi: Concurrency terminus
