= List of highways numbered 25A =

The following highways are numbered 25A:

== Canada ==
- Prince Edward Island Route 25A

== United States ==
- Florida State Road 25A
  - County Road 25A (Alachua County, Florida)
  - County Road 25A (Columbia County, Florida)
  - County Road 25A (Hamilton County, Florida)
  - County Road 25A (Lake County, Florida)
  - County Road 25A (Marion County, Florida)
- Maryland Route 25A
- Nebraska Highway 25A
  - Nebraska Link 25A
- Nevada State Route 25A (former)
- New Jersey Route 25A (former)
- New York State Route 25A
- Vermont Route 25A / New Hampshire Route 25A

Preceded by 25	Lists of highways sharing the same number 25A	Succeeded by 25B
