= List of highways numbered 25C =

The following highways are numbered 25C:

== United States ==
- New Hampshire Route 25C
- New York State Route 25C (former)

Preceded by 25B	Lists of highways sharing the same number 25C	Succeeded by 26
