= Ticonderoga (CDP), New York =

Ticonderoga, New York
- Census-designated place
- Location in Essex County and the state of New York.
- Coordinates: 43°50′55″N 73°25′23″W
- Country: United States
- State: New York
- County: Essex
- Town: Ticonderoga
- Incorporated: May 18, 1889
- Dissolved: December 31, 1993

Area
  - Total: 4.35 sq mi (11.27 km^{2})
  - Land: 4.27 sq mi (11.07 km^{2})
  - Water: 0.077 sq mi (0.20 km^{2})
- Elevation: 154 ft (47 m)

Population (2020)
  - Total: 3,250
  - Density: 760.7/sq mi (293.71/km^{2})
- ZIP Code: 12883
- Area code: 518
- FIPS code: 36-73880

Ticonderoga (/taɪkɒndəˈroʊɡə/) is a hamlet in the southeast part of the town of Ticonderoga, in Essex County, New York, United States. The name is derived from the Haudenosaunee term for "between the two waters", the two waters being Lake George and Lake Champlain. The hamlet became a census-designated place (CDP) in 2008. As of the 2020 census, the population was 3,250, out of a total 4,789 residents in the town of Ticonderoga.

== History ==
In 1889, the hamlet of Ticonderoga was incorporated as a village within the town of Ticonderoga, but in 1992 residents voted to dissolve the village. The area is an important location for the production of paper and the mining of graphite; the familiar yellow "Ticonderoga pencils" were named after the graphite mines.

Fort Ticonderoga, near the hamlet on Lake Champlain, (the hamlet is on Lake George), was a military outpost that fell into disrepair. The modern fort was built on its ruins.

The 1988 publication, "Ticonderoga (Village) Multiple Resource Area", presents a history of the village and its historic sites.

The Lake George Steamboat Company continues to operate steamboats from Ticonderoga.

== Geography ==
Ticonderoga is in Upstate New York, south of Plattsburgh, and near the Vermont border. The community lies between Lake George and Lake Champlain on the site of a portage between the two lakes, previously guarded by historic Fort Ticonderoga. The waterway running through this portage is called the La Chute River, which drains the outflow of Lake George into Lake Champlain, and it contains a waterfall at the eastern edge of the hamlet.

During the summer, a diesel-powered cable ferry connects the community to Shoreham, Vermont.

The junction of New York State Route 9N, New York State Route 74, and New York State Route 22 is at the northern edge of the CDP.

According to the U.S. Census Bureau, the CDP has a total area of 4.35 square miles (11.27 km^{2}), of which 4.27 square miles (11.07 km^{2}) is land and 0.08 square miles (0.20 km^{2}), or 1.81%, is water.

== Demographics ==
As of the 2020 census, there were 3,250 people, 1,592 housing units, and 1,380 families in the CDP. The racial makeup was 92.5% White (3,006 people), 0.4% African American (13), 0.2% Native American (7), 0.7% Asian (23), 0.0% Pacific Islander (2), 0.9% from some other race (31), and 5.1% from two or more races. Those of Hispanic or Latino origin made up 1.7% of the population

The ancestry was 20.2% English, 19.5% French, 16.7% Irish, 7.2% Italian, 6.3% German, 2.8% Polish, 2.2% French Canadian, 1.6% Scottish, and 1.2% Dutch.

The median age was 41.1 years old. 22.2% of the population were 65 or older, with 11.1% between the ages of 65 and 74, 6.9% between the ages of 75 and 84, and 4.1% 85 or older. 7.3% of the population were veterans.

The median household income was $50,700, with families having $51,908, married couples having $95,667, and non-families having $27,292. A total of 13.2% of the population were in poverty, with 14.9% of people under 18, 13.8% between the ages of 18 and 64, and 10.0% of people 65 or older were in poverty.

Historical population
Census	Pop.	Note	%±
2010	3,382		—
2020	3,250		−3.9%
U.S. Decennial Census

== Education ==
The census-designated place is in the Ticonderoga Central School District.

== See also ==
- National Register of Historic Places listings in Essex County, New York
