= Elizabethtown (CDP), New York =

Elizabethtown, New York
- Census-designated place
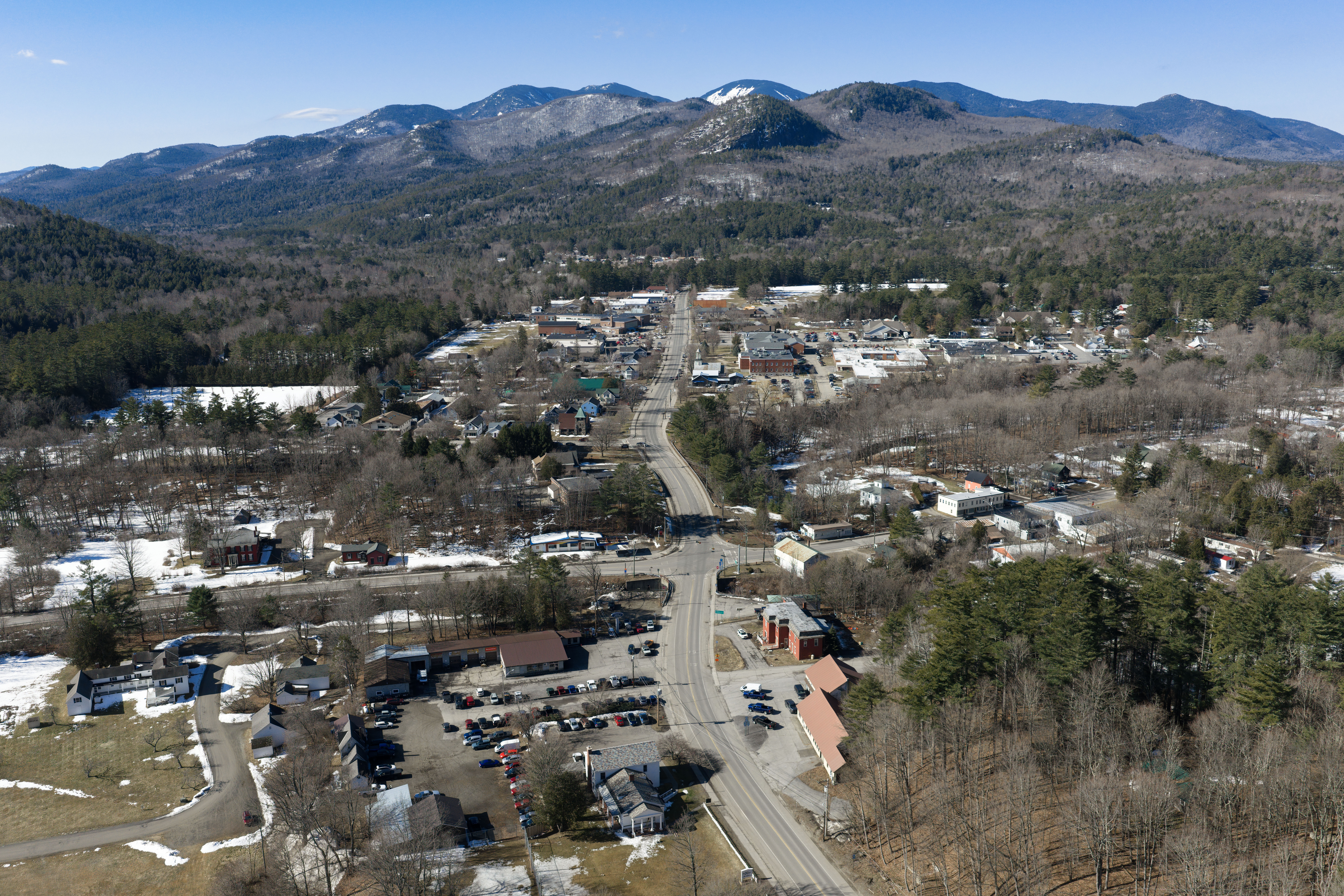
- Aerial view

- Location in Essex County and the state of New York.
- Coordinates: 44°12′59″N 73°35′26″W
- Country: United States
- State: New York
- County: Essex
- Town: Elizabethtown
- Village incorporated: 1876
- Village dissolved: 1981

Area
  - Total: 3.31 sq mi (8.57 km^{2})
  - Land: 3.31 sq mi (8.56 km^{2})
  - Water: 0.0039 sq mi (0.01 km^{2})
- Elevation: 560 ft (170 m)

Population (2020)
  - Total: 746
  - Density: 225.7/sq mi (87.14/km^{2})
- ZIP code: 12932
- Area code: 518
- FIPS code: 36-23822

Elizabethtown is a hamlet and census-designated place (CDP) in the town of Elizabethtown in Essex County, New York, United States. The population of the CDP was 754 at the 2010 census, out of a total town population of 1,163.

Elizabethtown is the county seat of Essex County and the location of the town government. The name is taken from that of Elizabeth Gilliland, the wife of an early settler and investor, William Gilliland.

== History ==
The community was developed by settlers moving deeper into the town from the first settlement in New Russia. Elizabethtown became the county seat in 1807. Due to the focus on government, the law profession was a prominent occupation after the middle of the 19th century. Elizabethtown incorporated as a village in 1876, but the village government dissolved itself in 1981.

== The courthouse ==
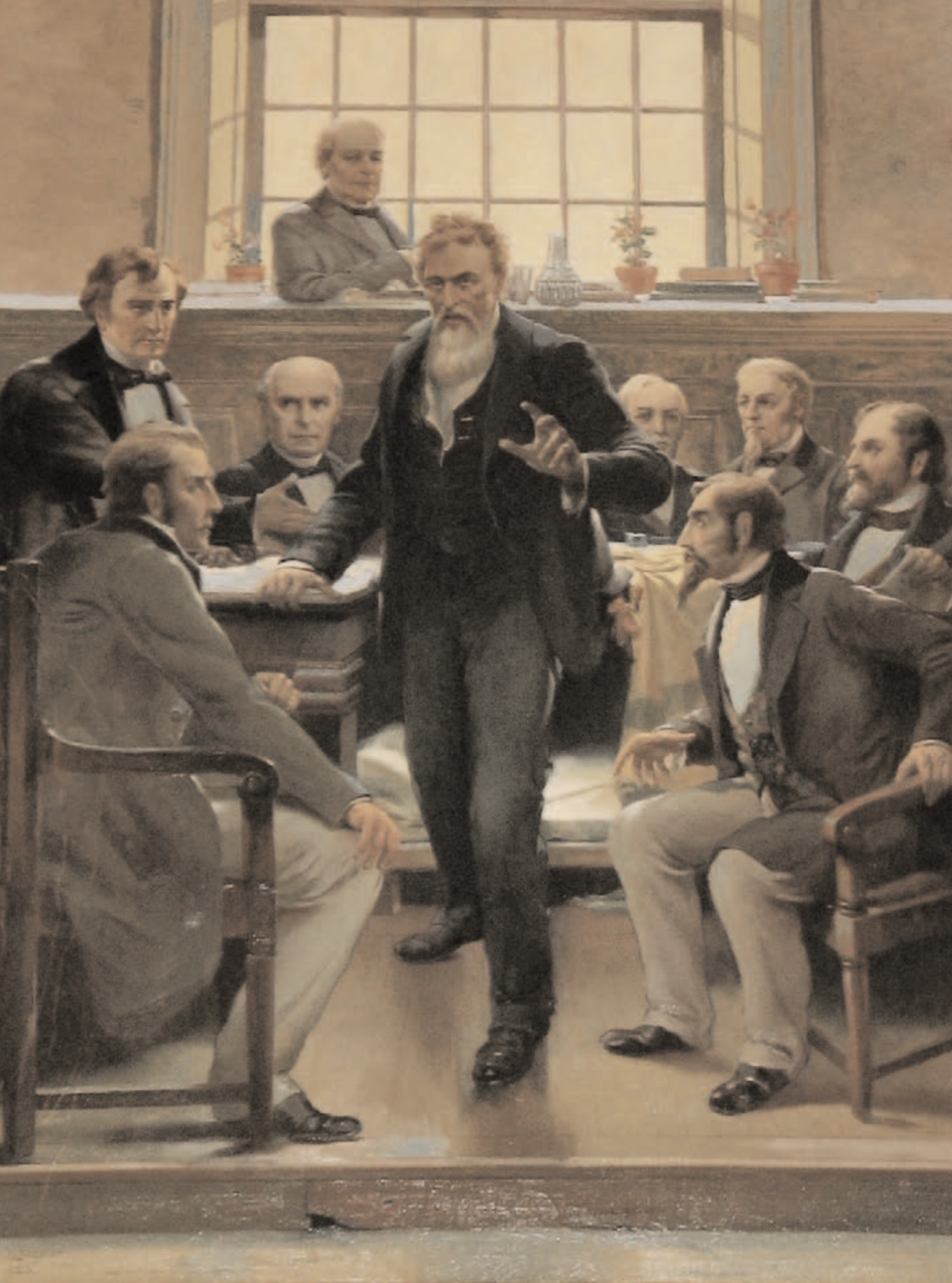
Portrait of John Brown, hanging in the Essex County Courthouse

The Essex County Courthouse is located in Ellizabethtown. The night of December 6, 1859, John Brown's body lay there in state, with six local citizens, including Orlando Gibbons, as honor guard. The county later commissioned a life-size portrait of Brown, which hangs in the courthouse today (2021). "An early county clerk" framed these words from John Brown's last speech:

I say I am yet too young to understand that God is any respecter of persons. I believe that to have interfered as I have done—as I have always freely admitted I have done—in behalf of His despised poor was not wrong, but right. Now, if it is deemed necessary that I should forfeit my life for the furtherance of the ends of justice, and mingle my blood further with the blood of my children and with the blood of millions in this slave country whose rights are disregarded by wicked, cruel, and unjust enactments—I submit; so let it be done!

== Geography ==
Elizabethtown is in the northern part of the town, located at the junction of US Route 9 and NY 9N. The Boquet River (pronounced BO-kwet) flows past the east side of the hamlet.

== Demographics ==
Historical population
Census	Pop.	Note	%±
2020	746		—
U.S. Decennial Census

== Education ==
The census-designated place is in the Boquet Valley Central School District at Elizabethtown-Lewis-Westport.
