= List of highways numbered 25B =

The following highways are numbered 25B:

== United States ==
- County Road 25B (Alachua County, Florida)
- Nebraska Link 25B
- New Hampshire Route 25B
- New Jersey Route 25B (former)
- New York State Route 25B
- Vermont Route 25B

Preceded by 25A	Lists of highways sharing the same number 25B	Succeeded by 25C
