= Wilmington (CDP), New York =

Wilmington, New York
- Census-designated place
- Location within New York
- Coordinates: 44°23′19″N 73°48′55″W
- Country: United States
- State: New York
- County: Essex
- Town: Wilmington

Area
  - Total: 8.34 sq mi (21.60 km^{2})
  - Land: 8.24 sq mi (21.33 km^{2})
  - Water: 0.10 sq mi (0.27 km^{2})
- Elevation: 1,020 ft (310 m)

Population (2020)
  - Total: 843
  - Density: 102.4/sq mi (39.52/km^{2})
- Time zone: UTC-5 (Eastern (EST))
  - Summer (DST): UTC-4 (EDT)
- ZIP code: 12997
- FIPS code: 36-82304

Wilmington is a hamlet and census-designated place (CDP) in the town of Wilmington in Essex County, New York, United States. The population of the CDP was 843 at the 2020 census, out of a total town population of 880.

== Geography ==
The Wilmington CDP covers a large area in the central part of the town of Wilmington, including the hamlet of Wilmington but extending west to include the hamlet of North Pole, east as far as Hardy Road, and south as far as Fox Farm Road. The West Branch of the Ausable River flows from southwest to northeast through the center of the CDP.

New York State Route 86 runs through the center of the CDP, leading southwest 12 miles (19 km) to Lake Placid and east 5 miles (8 km) to Jay. New York State Route 431 leads west from NY 86 near the center of Wilmington 8 miles (13 km) nearly to the summit of Whiteface Mountain.

According to the United States Census Bureau, the Wilmington CDP has a total area of 8.3 square miles (21.6 km^{2}), of which 8.3 square miles (21.4 km^{2}) is land and 0.1 square miles (0.2 km^{2}), or 1.05%, is water.

== Demographics ==
Historical population
Census	Pop.	Note	%±
2020	843		—
U.S. Decennial Census

== Education ==
Most of the census-designated place is in the Lake Placid Central School District, while a portion is in Boquet Valley Central School District at Elizabethtown-Lewis-Westport.
