= FLC =

FLC may refer to:

- Federal Laboratory Consortium, a U.S.-based technology transfer organization
- Feminist literary criticism
- Ferroelectric liquid crystal
- Fisheries Law Centre, in Vancouver, British Columbia, Canada
- FLIC (file format), used to store animation files
- Florida Literacy Coalition, Inc., an American non-profit organization
- Flowering Locus C, a plant gene
- Folsom Lake College, in California, United States
- Football League Championship, in England
- Football League Cup, in England
- Forest Lake Camp, in New York, United States
- Forming limit curve
- Fort Lewis College, in Durango, Colorado, United States
- Free light chains of antibodies
- Front de Liberation du Champa in Southeast Asia
- Front for the Liberation of the Somali Coast, historical UNDP code
- Full load current
- Fun Lovin' Criminals, an American band

== See also ==
- floruit circa (fl. c.)
