= Brant Lake =

Brant Lake may refer to:

- Brant Lake, New York, a hamlet
- Brant Lake (New York), lake near the hamlet
- Brant Lake (South Dakota), a lake
