= Chester, New York =

Chester, New York may refer to:

- Chester (village), New York, a village in Orange County, New York, United States
- Chester, Orange County, New York, a town in Orange County, New York, United States
- Chester, Warren County, New York, a town in Warren County, New York, United States

== See also ==
- Chestertown, New York, a hamlet in Warren County, New York, United States
- Port Chester, New York, a village in Westchester County, New York, United States
