= Trout Brook (Schroon River tributary) =

Trout Brook Stone Bridge Creek
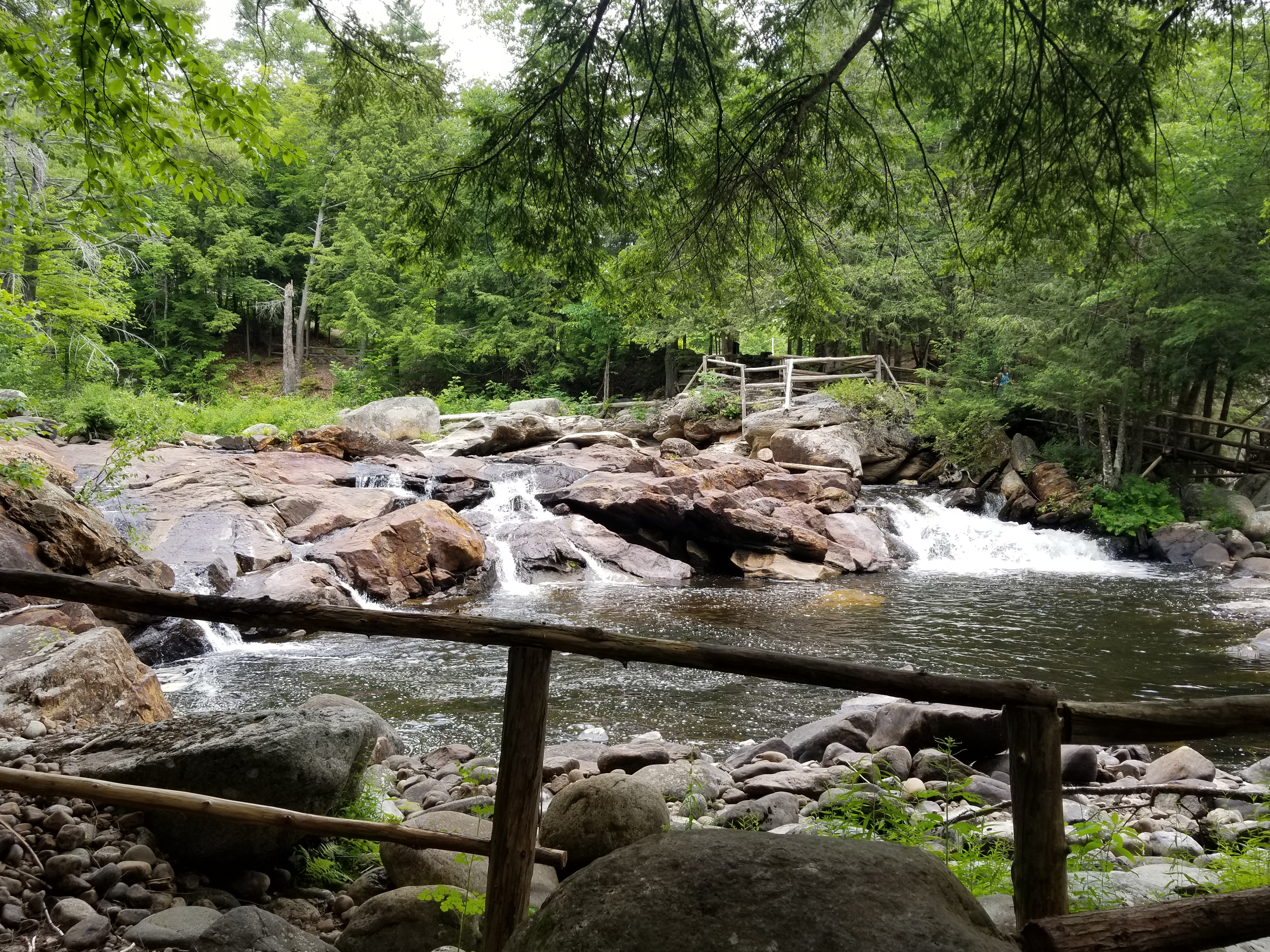
- Trout Brook at Natural Stone Bridge and Caves, Pottersville, New York

- Location of the mouth of Trout Brook Trout Brook (Schroon River tributary) (the United States)

Location
- Country: United States
- State: New York
- Region: Capital District
- County: Warren
- Town: Schroon Lake

Physical characteristics
- Mouth: Schroon River
  - location: Town of Chester
  - coordinates: 43°51′09″N 73°51′00″W
  - elevation: 801 ft (244 m)
- Length: 15.7 miles (25.3 km)
- Basin size: 90 square miles (230 km^{2})

Basin features
- Progression: Trout Brook → Schroon River → Hudson River → Atlantic Ocean

Trout Brook, known in older sources as Stone Bridge Creek, is a river that is located in Warren County, New York. The river, located in the eastern Adirondack Mountains, is a third-order tributary which flows 15.7 miles (25.3 km) southeast into the Schroon River, just south of Schroon Lake. The river has three branches, and is stocked with 1,300 yearling brook trout by the New York State Department of Environmental Conservation.

The river is most notable for running through the Natural Stone Bridge and Caves, a series of marble solutional caves which was formed by the river over the course of 14,000 years. The river briefly becomes a subterranean river around the caves, resurfacing after 200 metres (660 ft) underground.
