= Pottersville, New York =

Hamlet in Chester, Warren County, New York

Pottersville is a hamlet and census-designated place in the town of Chester, Warren County, New York, United States. As of the 2020 census, Pottersville had a population of 359. The community is located in Adirondack Park on U.S. Route 9. Pottersville is home to Natural Stone Bridge and Caves, a tourist attraction featuring the largest marble cave entrance in the eastern United States.

== Demographics ==
Pottersville is Chester's second largest hamlet behind Chestertown.

As of the census of 2010, the population in Pottersville is 424. The population density is 182.29 people per square mile. The town's population is mainly white at 97.88%, 0.24% black, 0.71% Hispanic, and 0.94% Asian. The majority of the population in Pottersville is of Irish descent at 23.46%. The average person in Pottersville is about 39 years old; the median age of men in the town is 40 years and the median age of women is 38 years. There are a total of 162 households in the town with an average of 2.49 people per household. The average family size in Pottersville is 3.05 with 48.77% being married couple families and 34.5% being non-family households.

The median household income for people ranging from the ages of 24 to 44 in Pottersville is $32,009. For people 65 years and above, the median income is $45,313. The population in poverty in the town is 201 (55.07%) and the family in poverty count is 40 (33.06%).

Pottersville's population is composed mainly of females at 52.12%, compared to the male population of the remaining 47.88%. These numbers are similar when compared to New York's national average of 51.61% female and 48.39% male. The U.S. average is 50.84% female and 49.16% male.

== School District ==
Along with the Chestertown and Horicon, Pottersville students are zoned to North Warren Central School.

== Attractions ==
Pottersville is home to the largest marble cave entrance in the eastern United States, Natural Stone Bridge and Caves. A show cave and a tourist attraction, the eleven caves in the park can be visited after an admission fee.

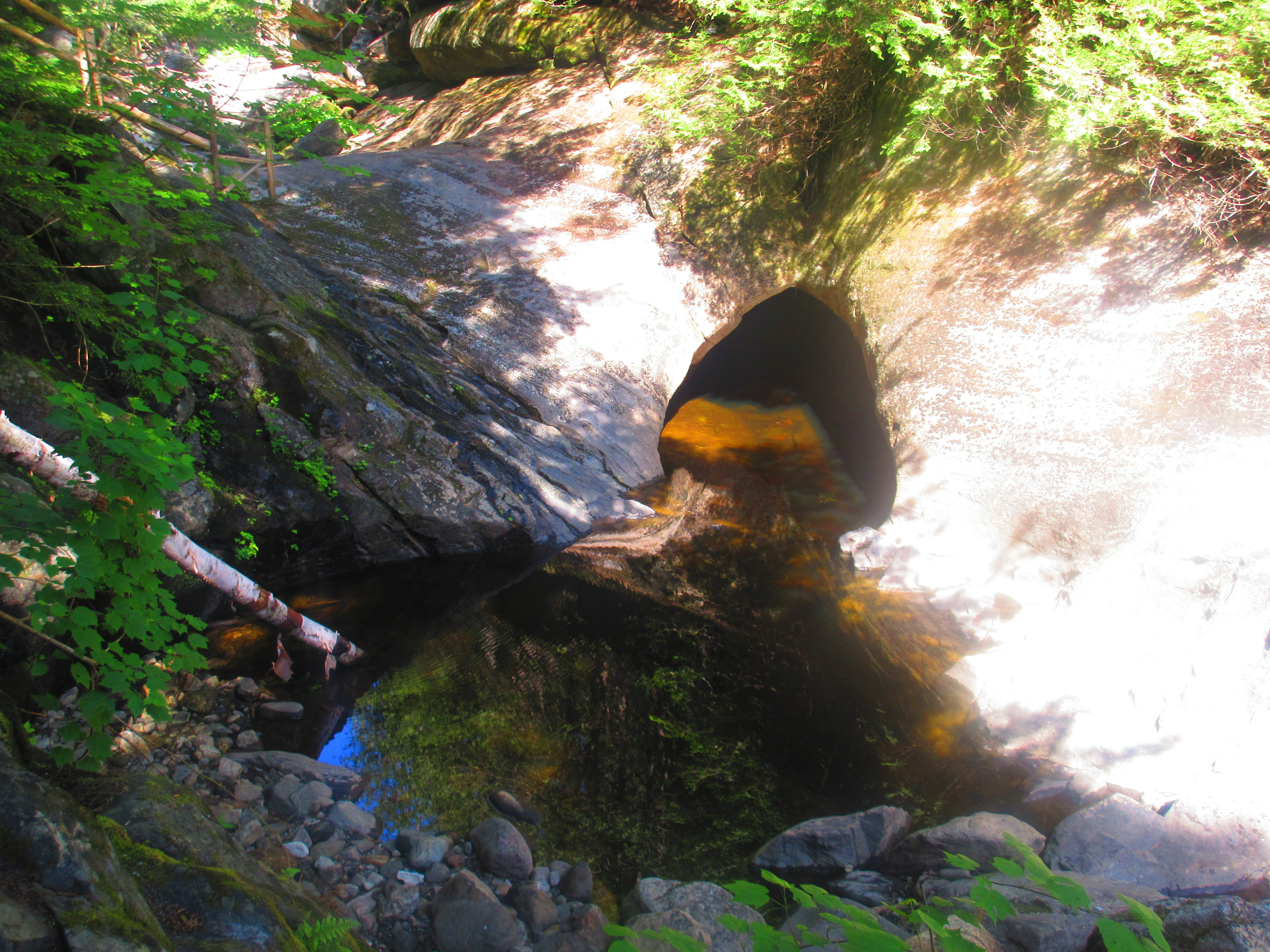
Natural Stone Caves.

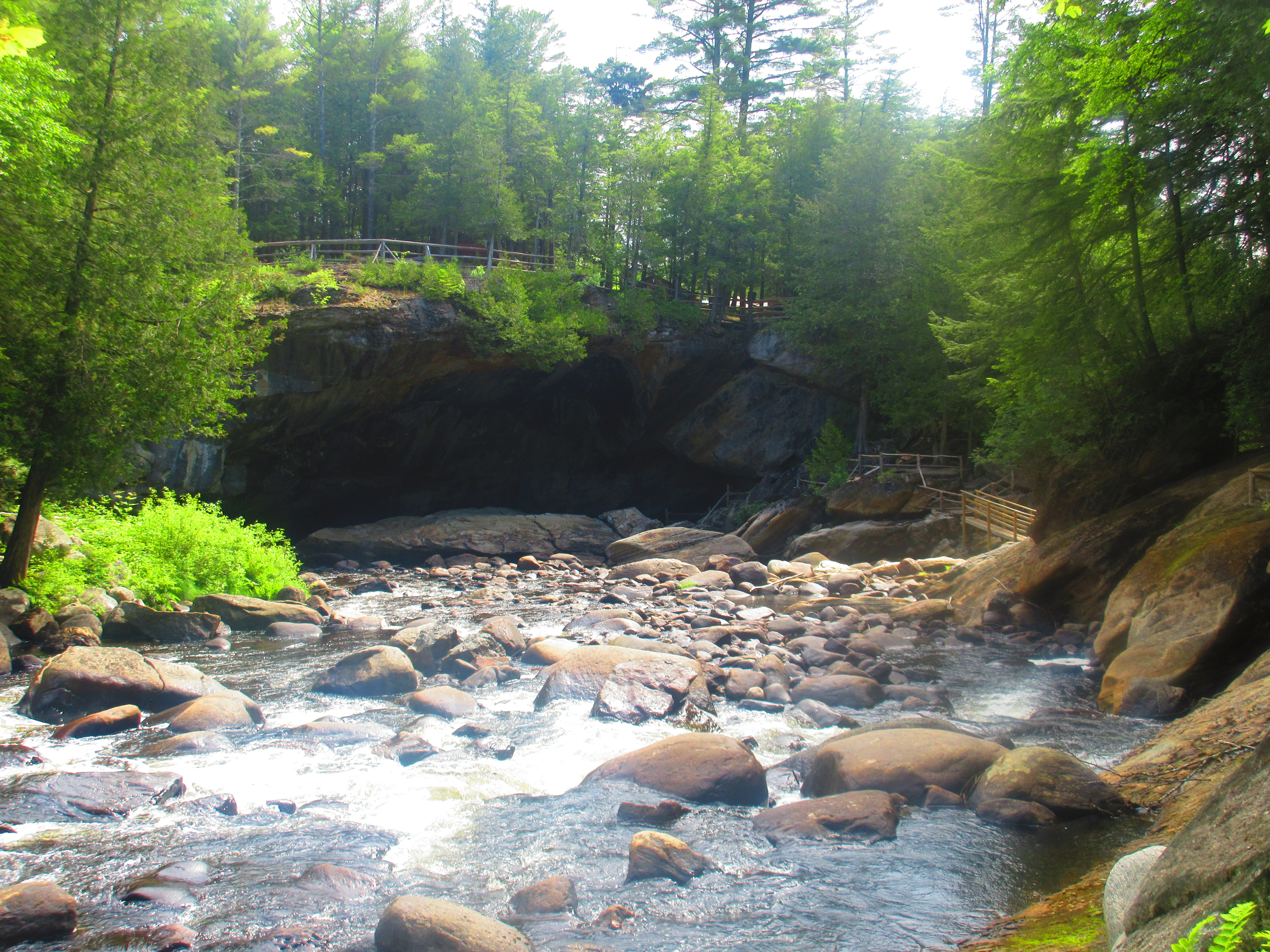
Natural Stone Caves.

Along with aforementioned attractions, Pottersville is in close proximity of multiple lakes. The town is just 23 miles from the popular tourist site, Lake George, 4.5 miles from a smaller lake, Loon Lake, .5 miles from Schroon Lake, and 10 miles from Friends Lake. These locations make it easy for tourists to participate in water related activities during the warmer months and partake in winter activities during the long winter months.

== Climate ==
Pottersville gets about 41 inches of rain per year with a national average of about 37. The town receives about 78 inches of snowfall per year. The national average is 25. There are 116 precipitation days on average per year compared to the national average of 100. The town has about 176 sunny days per year with a national average of 205 per year. The average temperature in July in Pottersville is 80.6 degrees compared to the national average of 86.5 degrees. The average low in January in the town is 7.6 degrees compared with the higher national average of 20.5 degrees. The UV index for Pottersville is 2.9 with a national average of 4.3. The town is 1,268 feet above sea level with the national average of 1,443 feet.

Pottersville is subject to cooler, more temperate weather due to its location in Adirondack State Park. The Adirondacks (or ADKs for short) are in northern New York. The lakes in the area greatly contribute to the humidity in the summer months (late May through August), thus contributing to the rapid and unforeseen change in weather and large quantities of precipitation the area gets in relation to the national average. The Adirondacks see a clear distinction between seasons, but the cold weather months last the longest. Snow typically begins to fall in late October and continues until the later days of April/early May. Though winters in the Adirondacks are already harsh and can easily reach down into the negative degrees, the windchill can make the temperature feel 10 or more degrees colder. Blizzards are also an ongoing threat in the region. Despite the long winter season, it is estimated that the sun shines 60 to 70 percent of daylight hours during the summer months. The summer months are also some of the rainiest of the year.

== History ==
Pottersville was founded on March 25, 1799, as a part of the Town of Chester, Warren County. The town was mainly agricultural; most families owned livestock, such as sheep, for access to clothing material. Carding mills and tanneries were eventually built as the first forms of manufacturing outside of the home. In 1805, roads connecting Town of Chester were opened and are in the same spots today.

Production in the Town of Chester in the year 1845 included 50,036 pounds of butter, 11,990 pounds of cheese, 31,176 bushels of potatoes and 20,372 yards of cloth. These statistics prove the Town of Chester to be a mostly-agricultural society in the 19th century.

Travelers would often stop in at the Wells House (built in 1845 by Joseph Hotchkiss) which offered memorable hospitality as a hotel. The Wells House offered fish dinners caught on Schroon Lake and venison from the surrounding forests. The hotel was frequented by "Summer Folks" from areas such as Albany, New York, and Glens Falls, New York.

An old Pottersville event was the "Pottersville Fair" which was started in 1877 by a family by the name of Faxton. The fair went bankrupt after a few years due to gambling and drinking issues, but was held once again in 1910 by the "Pottersville Fair Association". Some of the festivities of the 1913 Pottersville Fair included watching 400 automobiles parade through the streets, along with an Ox race, music, a dog and pony show, and a contortionist, with an audience of about 7,000 people.

== Places of Worship ==
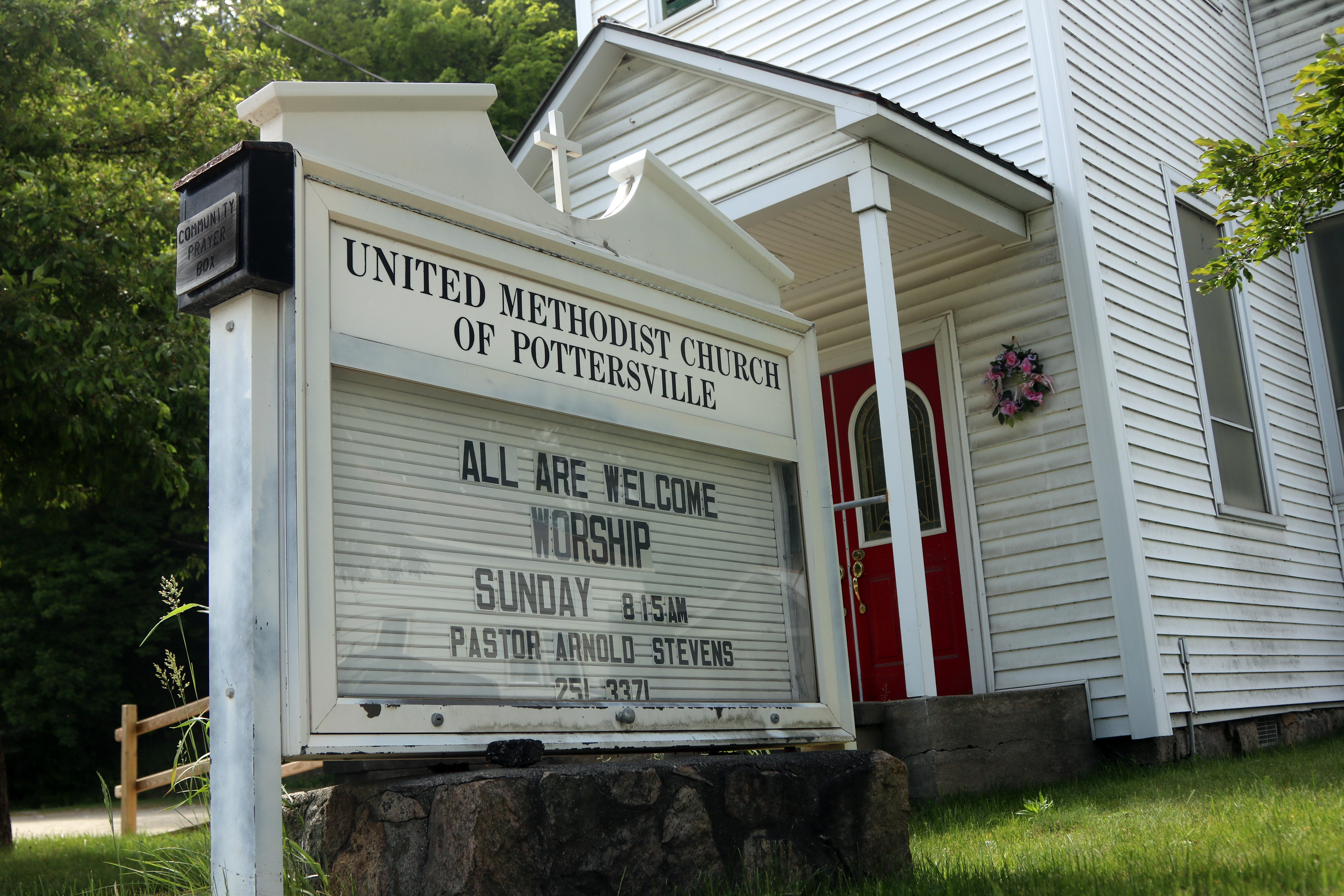
A church on U.S. Route 9 in the hamlet of Pottersville, New York.

A few of the Churches established in Town of Chester are the Community United Methodist Church in Chestertown, the Episcopal Church/Sonrise Lutheran Church in Pottersville, and the North Creek Seventh Day Adventist Church.
