= Arnold H. Wagner =

Dr. Arnold H. Wagner
- Born: September 9, 1878; Lisbon, New York, US
- Died: September 9, 1949 (aged 71); Los Angeles, California, US
- Occupation: University professor of Music

Arnold Henry Wagner (September 9, 1878 – September 9, 1949) was a musicologist and linguist who helped pioneer the improvement of voice and musical vibrato and advanced the theory of the psychology of music. Over four decades he taught music and foreign singing language at the University of Southern California.

== Early life and family ==
Arnold Wagner was born in Lisborn on 9 September 1878 and died on 9 September 1949.He was the youngest of seven children of William Henry Wagner who was a farmer and American Civil War veteran and his mother called Harriet Parmelia Arnold. His father conducted local choruses and community singing events and he has greatly influenced to Arnold Henry Wagner.

Arnold Wagner married Pearl Carlotta Comer. She was a concert pianist.

== Education ==
Arnold Wagner attended rural schools at the Ogdensburg Grammar School and Free Academy. He earned his lifetime teaching certificate at the State Normal and Training School in Potsdam, New York. In 1904, he traveled to Europe to study the French, German and Italian languages. He returned to the United States in 1906. By 1911, he resumed his education in Los Angeles. In 1919, he earned a Bachelor's of Arts degree at the University of Southern California (USC) and a Master's Degree in 1924 in music.

He continued his studies at the Teachers College at Columbia University in 1925-1926. He spent summers from 1924 to 1928 at the State University of Iowa where he received his doctorate degree in music.

== Musicologist career ==
Arnold Wagner began his career as a teacher in 1900 in Adirondack, New York. However, he quickly accepted a position offered by the United States government to teach English and music in the Philippines. He was part of the first batch of 100 students in 1901 to go overseas to teach English, music and art. He initially taught in the provinces before moving to Manila.

He returned to the United States in 1904 and became a music supervisor for the public school systems in Douglas and Bisbee, Arizona.

He returned to Los Angeles in 1911, Wagner taught in local schools before joining the Santa Monica Unified School District in 1913 to teach music and language. He later became a head of the music department. Meanwhile, he taught music during the summers at USC and at the University of California, Berkeley from 1921 to 1924 and in 1925 at the University of California, Los Angeles. By the mid-1920s he was a permanent professor at USC, teaching English, French, German, Italian and Spanish as it applied to singing. He also directed the university's glee clubs and directed choruses in addition to teaching courses in music appreciation and mentoring new teachers.

In the 1930s, he collaborated on two important voice and music projects. He conducted a series of experiments with Dr. Joel Pressman at Cedars of Lebanon Hospital in Los Angeles on vocal registration. Pressman had an expertise in the larynx and developed a technique to film the larynx working.

Among his findings, particularly in his collaboration with Pressman, Wagner found that vocal artists must pay close attention to refining their vibrato during performances and learn to control to increase or diminish the vibrato rate and the extent of oscillation. By exercising conscious control singers can modulate the rate if it becomes too slow or too fast or the oscillation becomes inappropriate to the emotion of the performance. To establish that control, Wagner argued that vocalists whether a child or adult must pay attention to the action the musculature of the larynx that will lead to correct habits of control. Repetition and practice can lead to successful command of the vibrato. Many vocal artists, with the rise of radio and motion picture musical performances in the 1920s and 1930s, had difficulty with pitch. Wagner's study, "An Experimental Study in Control of the Vocal Vibrato," provided singers with a path to exercise control over oscillation and pitch.

He developed techniques to correct bad vibrato in singers' voices and in string and woodwind instruments, which was previously thought impossible.

Arnold Wagner also conducted research with Dr. Carl E. Seashore, a prominent psychologist and educator at the State University of Lowa where they studied the vibrato in the voice and its application to string and woodwind instruments.The focus was to remedy bad vocal vibrato. The research resulted in Seashore's book called "Studies in the Psychology of Music, Vol. 1," in which Wagner contributed the chapter "Remedial and Artistic Development of the Vibrato."

== Publications ==
- The Vibrato as a Factor in Artistic Singing (Pacific Coast Musician, June 1927)
- An Experimental Study in the Control of the Vocal Vibrato (University of Iowa Psychology Monographs, 1930)
- Research in the Field of Voice Training (Music Educators’ National Conference, 1939-1940)
- Interpretation in singing (Music Supervisors Journal, May 1928)
- C. Seashore, ed., Studies in the Psychology of Music, Vol. 1, "Remedial and Artistic Development of the Vibrato" chapter, (University of Iowa, 1932)
