= Island Pond (New York) =

- Location within New York Island Pond (the United States)
- Location: Warren County, New York, United States
- Coordinates: 43°41′01″N 73°39′24″W
- Type: Lake
- Basin countries: United States
- Surface area: 100 acres (0.40 km^{2})
- Average depth: 5 feet (1.5 m)
- Max. depth: 25 feet (7.6 m)
- Shore length^{1}: 1.6 miles (2.6 km)
- Surface elevation: 1,332 feet (406 m)
- Islands: 1
- Settlements: Brant Lake, New York
- ^{1} Shore length is not a well-defined measure.

Island Pond is a lake located east of Brant Lake, New York. Fish species present in the lake are brook trout, and brown bullhead. There is a carry down trail from Long Pond.
