= Horicon =

Horicon may refer to:

- Horicon, New York
- Horicon, Wisconsin
