= BLC =

BLC, Blc or blc can refer to:

== Code ==
- Belo Corporation (NYSE stock ticker BLC), a former Texan broadcasting company
- Brasil Central Linhas Aéreas (ICAO airline code BLC), a defunct airline
- × Brassolaeliocattleya (horticultural abbreviation code Blc.), an orchid genus
- Nuxalk language (ISO 639 language code blc), a critically endangered Salish language spoken formerly known as Bella Coola

== Initialism abbreviation ==
- BLC Leather Technology Centre, a British testing, auditing and consulting business
- B lymphocyte chemoattractant (or CXCL13), a chemokine selectively chemotactic for B lymphocytes
- Bachelor of Canon Law, a degree in ecclesiastical studies
- Basic Leader Course, a course of study for non-commissioned officers in the US Army
- Bethany Lutheran College, a private Christian liberal arts college in Mankato, Minnesota
- Bethesda Lutheran Communities, a Wisconsin-based non-profit serving people with intellectual and developmental disabilities, now known as AbleLight
- Big League Chew, a brand of bubble-gum originally created by the Wrigley Company
- Binary lambda calculus (or Binary combinatory logic), a concept in information theory
- Bloodline Champions, a video game released in 2011 by Stunlock Studios
- Boston Library Consortium, a New England academic library consortium
- Boundary layer control, a concept in aircraft wing design
- Brant Lake Camp, a sleep-away summer camp in Brant Lake, New York, U.S.
- Breakthrough Listen Candidate, a candidate SETI signal detected by the Breakthrough Listen project
- Buxton & Leek College, a further education college in the East Midlands of the UK
