= North Warren =

North Warren may refer to:

- North Warren, Pennsylvania, place in Conewango Township, Warren County, Pennsylvania, United States
- North Warren RSPB reserve, nature reserve in Suffolk, England.
- North Warren Regional High School, school and school district in Blairstown, Warren County, New Jersey, United States
- North Warren Central School, school and school district in Chestertown, New York, United States
- Warren J. North (1922 – 2012), American test pilot and aeronautical engineer
