= North Warren Central School =

K–12 school in Chestertown, New York

Location
- 6110 State Route 8 Chestertown, New York; United States
- Coordinates: 43.663022°N 73.785154°W

Information
- Type: Public school
- Established: 1974; 52 years ago
- School district: North Warren Central School District
- Principal: Rebecca Vanderklish and Erica McGourty
- Teaching staff: 59.18 (FTE)
- Grades: PreK–12
- Enrollment: 472 (2023–2024)
- Student to teacher ratio: 7.98
- Colors: Green and Gold
- Mascot: Cougar
- Phone: (518) 494-3015
- Website: www.northwarrencsd.org

North Warren Central School is a public PreK–12 school and school district in Chestertown, New York, the northernmost school district in Warren County. It serves students from Chestertown, Horicon, and Pottersville. North Warren is a relatively large school district in size, but a relatively small school district in number of students. The North Warren Central School District is an independent entity, governed by an elected board of education consisting of seven members.

== District ==
Towns and their communities in the school district.

- Town of Chester
  - Chestertown
  - Pottersville
- Town of Horicon
  - Brant Lake
  - Adirondack

== Athletics ==
North Warren has 12 Varsity Sports teams that compete in Class D (smallest of NYS classes) of Section 2 in the NYSPHSAA. Most teams compete in the Adirondack League along with several other Class C and D schools in the area. Historically the field hockey team has been very successful and recently cross country, soccer, baseball and boys basketball have experienced success.

=== Cross country ===
The cross country running program is currently under the rule of Iana Torrens combined with Johnsburg and Minerva coaches, Matt Brown and Coach Dani.
2006 season:

- Wasaren League Champions (Boys)
- Section 2 Champions (Boys)
- 5th Place in State Championship Race (Boys)

2007 season:

- Adirondack League Champions (Boys)
- Adirondack League Championship Race Winners (Boys)

2009 season

- Adirondack League Champions (Girls)
- Adirondack League Championship Race Winners (Girls)

2010 season

- Adirondack League Champions (Girls)
- Adirondack League Championship Race Winners (Girls)
- Section 2 Champions (Girls)

2011 season

- Adirondack League Champions (Girls)
- Adirondack League Championship Race Winners (Girls)
- Section 2 Runner Up (Girls)

Past league all-stars

- Boys
  - Greg Turcotte (4 time 2003–2006)
  - Noah Dingman (4 time 2004–2007)
  - Alec Underwood (3 time 2008–2010)
  - André Wade (1 time 2004)
  - John Mulligan (1 time 2006)
  - Zack Smith (1 time 2007)
  - Ryan Wade (1 time 2007)
  - Stuart Mead (1 time 2007)
  - Jeffrey Bennett (1 time 2009)
  - Iain Underwood (3 time 2010–2012)
  - Cody Philips (1 time 2010)
- Girls
  - Sarah Turcotte (3 time 2006–2008)
  - Cassie Maday (4 time 2008–2011)
  - Ashley Maresca (4 time 2008–2011)
  - Megan Erickson (3 time 2009–2011) (2010,2011 League Champion)
  - Malory Wolfe (3 time 2009–2011)
  - Ellie Underwood (1 time 2011)
  - Lydia Kenney (1 time 2011)
  - Natasha Leuchanka (1 time 2006)
  - Melissa Frederick (1 time 2007)
  - Skyler Johnson (1 time 2007)
  - Tori Mardis (1 time 2009)

Past individual state qualifiers

- Boys
  - Greg Turcotte (2 time 2005, 2006)
  - Noah Dingman (2 time 2006, 2007)
- Girls
  - Natasha Leuchanka (1 time 2006)
  - Sarah Turcotte (1 time 2007)
  - Cassie Maday (1 time 2008)
  - Megan Erickson (3 time 2009–2011)

Past individual sectional champions

- Girls
  - Megan Erickson (2010)

=== Field hockey ===
Head coach Sue Huck retired in 2007; her replacement is Lynn Lewis. Field hockey is no longer offered at NWCS.

- Regional champions:
  - 1981
  - 1994
  - 2004
- Section 2 champions:
  - 1981
  - 1989
  - 1994
  - 1995
  - 2001
  - 2004
  - 2005
- State runner up:
  - 1994
  - 2004
- Section 2 runner up:
  - 1983
  - 1984
  - 1991
  - 1992
  - 1993
  - 2002
  - 2003

=== Soccer ===
Jimmy Conway is currently the head coach of the varsity soccer team.

- 2007 Adirondack League Champions
- 2007 Section 2 Class D Runner Up
- 1987 Section 2 Class D Runner Up

Past league all-stars:

- John Remmington
- Bruce Carpenter
- Jeff Lemelson

=== Boys basketball ===
James Cuyler is currently the head coach of the varsity basketball team.

- 2000 Section 2 Class D Champions
- 2001 Section 2 Class D Runner Up
- 2007 Section 2 Class D Runner Up
- 2020 Section 2 Class D champions
- 2024 Section 2 Class D champions
- 2024 State Class D champions

=== Girls basketball ===
P. J. Hogan is currently the head coach of the girls varsity basketball team.

- 1980 Section 2 Class D champion
- 1980 Section 2 Class D regional champions

=== Tennis ===
Chris Nelson is currently the head coach of the boys and girls tennis teams.

- 2007 Section 2 Class D runner up (boys)
- 2008 Section 2 Class D runner up

(Boys)

=== Baseball ===
John Kelly is currently the head coach of the varsity baseball team.

- 2008 Section 2 Class D runner up

== Academics ==
There are currently 10 Young Scholars, a program for the academically above average students. This is one of the largest in the area.

Notable graduates include Professor Udi Greenboim.
