= Natural Stone Bridge and Caves =

Marble show cave in New York State

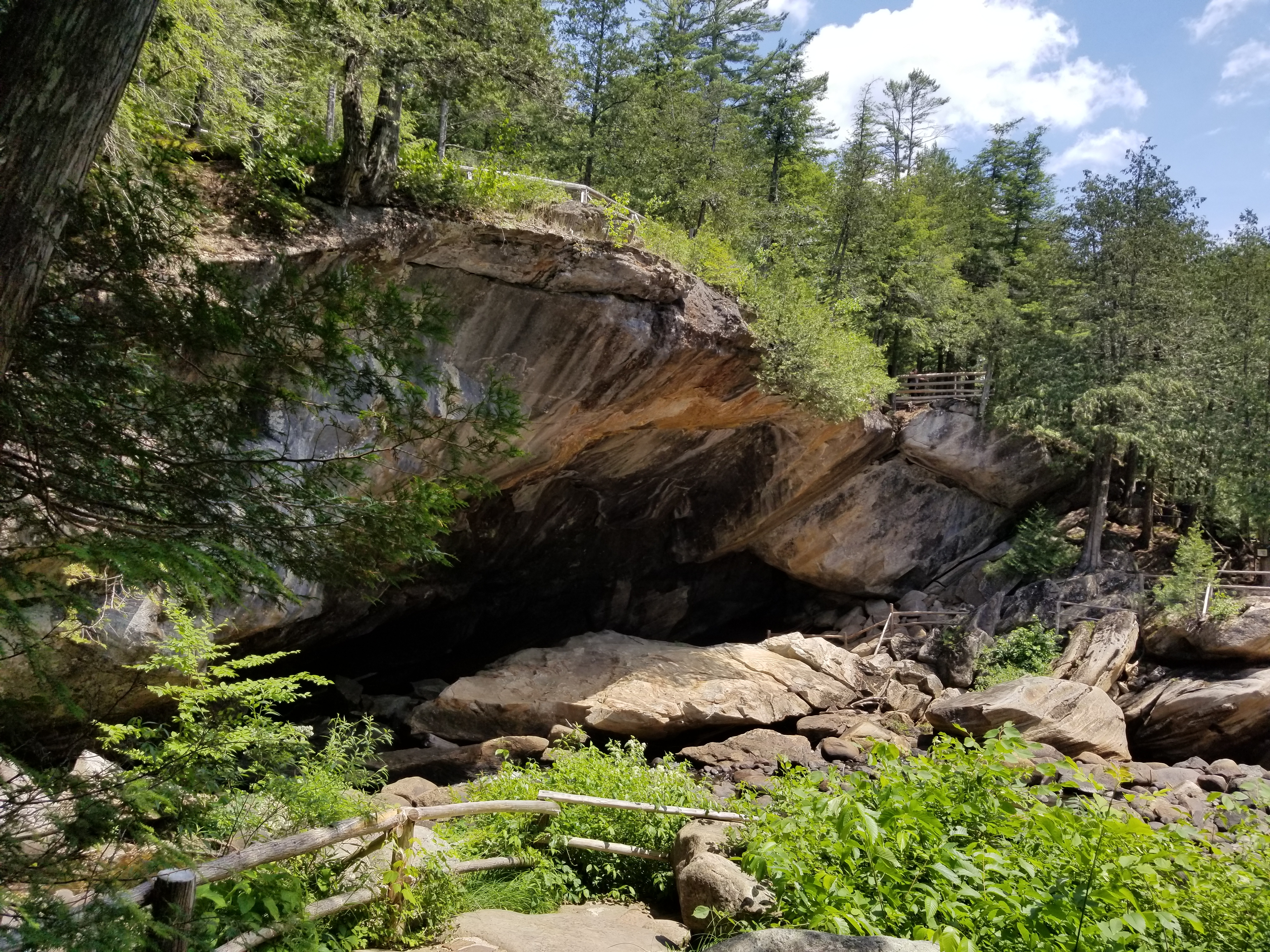
- Stone Bridge Cave, the park's namesake

- Location within New York Location within the United States
- Location: Pottersville, New York
- Coordinates: 43°44′51.06″N 73°51′8.399″W
- Elevation: 929 ft (283 m)
- Geology: Marble
- Show cave length: 0.75 miles (1.21 km) (self-guided surface trail)
- Lighting: LED
- Visitors: 32,000 yearly
- Website: Official website

Natural Stone Bridge and Caves is park with a system of eleven marble caves and karst formations, operated as a show cave located in Pottersville, New York. Visitors to the park can walk a trail which features the eponymous Stone Bridge Cave, advertised as the "largest marble cave entrance in the eastern United States", small caves, potholes, and various other karst features along Trout Brook.

== Description ==
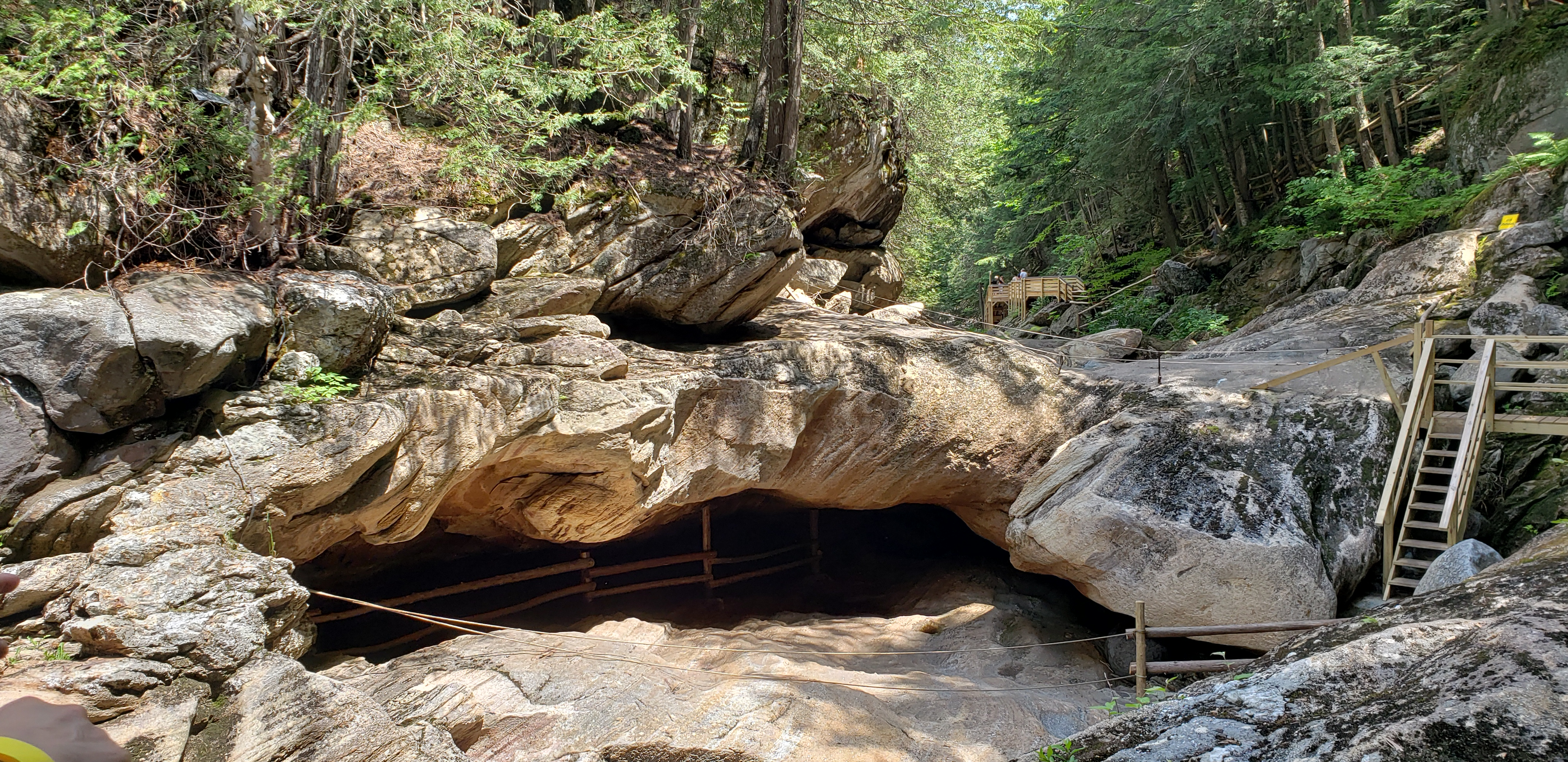
Lost Pool Cave, one of the eleven small caves in the park

The park consists of a system of marble caves, potholes, whirlpools and waterfalls formed by Trout Brook, which briefly becomes an underground river while flowing through several of the caves before resurfacing 200 metres (660 ft) away at a pothole known as "The Clamshell". Eleven caves are present in the park, including the park's eponymous Stone Bridge Cave, Noisy Cave, which contains a loud underground waterfall, Lost Pool Cave, Kelly's Slide Cave and Echo Cave. Excluding the massive entrance of Stone Bridge Cave, measuring 50 metres (160 ft) wide and 10 metres (33 ft) tall, most of the caves consist of short passages with few speleothems owing to the caves' relative youth. Many of the caves end in sumps, and are often completely flooded during high water events.

The park can be toured after admission by fee, with a 0.75 miles (1.21 km) long self-guided trail showcasing the caves, Trout Brook, potholes and associated karst features.

== Geology ==
The caves are in the eastern Adirondack Mountains, and are formed out of marble deposited 1.1 billion year ago during the Grenville orogeny and among oldest metamorphic rock in the state. Ancient thrust faulting have resulted in most of the marble in the area being found in small "pods" interspersed with non-soluble rock, with one such pod being the present setting of the caves. In contrast, the cave system is relatively youthful, with the park's ownership citing an age of around 14,000 years, postdating the Last Glacial Period.

The caves in the park are a system of solutional caves created by the Trout Brook. Glaciers during Last Glacial Period the eroded and changed the surrounding landscape, resulting in the deranging of Trout Brook, shifting it northeast from its preglacial route to its present location. After the retreat of the glaciers, the Trout Brook initially flowed immediately south after intersecting the marble pod making up the present-day caves. The Trout Brook, which is considerably acidic due to aeration from upstream riffles and its 90 square miles (230 km^{2}) catchment area, dissolved passages into the marble until the Trout Brook abandoned its former channel and flowed underground, an example of stream capture. Cave development continues to the present day, with cave passages being enlarged by 1 millimetre (0.039 in) a year.

== History ==
The caves were known to Europeans since the mid-18th century. Horatio Gates Spafford, father of Presbyterian church elder and lawyer Horatio Spafford, mentions Stone Bridge Cave in his 1813 A Gazetteer of the State of New-York. The property surrounding the caves was given to Jacob Van Benthuysen, whose descendants still own the park, as a reward for service during the American Revolutionary War, and was the site of a sawmill until the early 20th century. Tourism at the caves began in 1929, when the grand-niece of the property owners, Lydia Neubuck Harper, started offering impromptu tours of the caves to interested tourists for a nickel. Harper and her mother, Elfrieda Heldt, bought the property in 1944, and together with her brothers developed the caves into a tourist attraction, adding trails, boardwalks and a gift shop when they gained ownership of the property in 1944. In November 1956, a 900 ton section of Stone Bridge Cave fell, possibly due to nearby road works.

The caves are presently owned by Greg Beckler, nephew of Lydia Neubuck Harper. In 2017, the cave property was a filming location for the Escape at Dannemora miniseries.

== Activities and amenities ==
The main activity available to visitors is the self-guided 0.75 miles (1.21 km) caves trail which traverses the property, showcasing the various caves and geological features on the property. The owners of the property also offer guided adventure tours; a strenuous, 3-4 hour caving crawl through the various caves on the property. Additional activities include snowshoe tours during the winter, gemstone mining, and disc golf.

The property also contains a gift shop which sells various rocks and minerals, a garden, historical display, and an ice cream shop.
