= Friends Lake =

- Location within New York Friends Lake (the United States)
- Location: Warren County, New York, United States
- Coordinates: 43°37′34″N 73°50′38″W
- Type: Lake
- Basin countries: United States
- Surface area: 447 acres (1.81 km^{2})
- Average depth: 14 feet (4.3 m)
- Max. depth: 30 feet (9.1 m)
- Shore length^{1}: 6.1 miles (9.8 km)
- Surface elevation: 915 feet (279 m)
- Settlements: Chestertown, New York
- ^{1} Shore length is not a well-defined measure.

Friends Lake is located south of Chestertown, New York. Fish species present in the lake are smallmouth bass, sunfish, largemouth bass, yellow perch, northern pike and brown bullhead. There is access at the inns and lodges around the lake.
