= Brant Lake Camp =

Sleep-away summer camp in Brant Lake, New York

Coordinates: 43.716783°N 73.693701°W

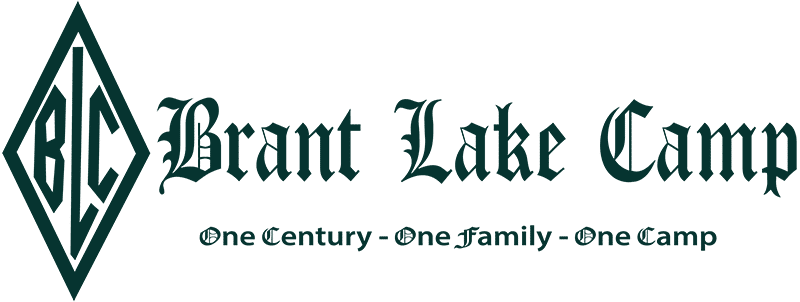
- Industry: Sleep-away summer camp
- Founded: 1916; 110 years ago
- Founders: Robert B. Gerstenzang, Joseph E. Eberly, and Jack F. Malloy
- Headquarters: Brant Lake, New York, United States
- Key people: Richie Gersten, Executive Director
- Website: brantlake.com

Brant Lake Camp is a sleep-away summer camp located in the Adirondack Mountains in Brant Lake, New York. It has been owned and operated by the same family since its founding in 1916.

== Programs ==
Brant Lake Camp is located on the lakefront of Brant Lake in the Adirondacks. The camp is spread of an area of more than 50 acres (20 ha). The camp focuses on sports and athletics while also offering arts and crafts and other activities for campers, ages 7 to 15. Brant Lake Camp employs professional athletics coaches in order for the campers to improve their athletic skills during the summer.

Brant Lake Camp has a color war, called Green and Gray, at the end of each summer. When alumni parents send their child to camp, they often ask the camp assign their children the same color as they were when they were campers.

== History ==
Brant Lake Camp was founded in 1916 and incorporated on March 24, 1917, by Robert B. Gerstenzang, Joseph E. Eberly, and Jack F. Malloy. The three men were physical education teachers and had been camp counselors at Camp Paradox, and they had wanted to create their own summer camp. Fred Parker, a local man who rented horses and carriages, introduced them to Dave Barlett. Barlett sold the three men his farm in Brant Lake for $5,000 (equivalent to $148,000 in 2025). The first camp season had 32 campers living in tents. Barlett worked as a camp counselor until he died a couple years later.

Eberly sold his share of ownership of the camp to Gerstenzang and Malloy in 1933. About six years later, Malloy sold his ownership share to Irv Schwartz. Around 1945, Gertzenzang bought the share from Schwartz so that he was the sole owner of the camp. Gerstenzang also owned the nearby Point O' Pines Camp, but he sold his ownership of Point O' Pines Camp to Sam Lipman in order to focus his efforts on Brant Lake Camp.

Gerstenzang's nephew Bob Gersten began as a camper, then worked as a counselor, and then became a group head. He was promoted to assistant director in 1946. Gersten became a partner of the camp in 1948. Gerstenzang's daughter Karen Meltzer started worked as a director of Brant Lake Camp in 1962.

Brant Lake Dance Camp for girls began in 1980, founded by Gersten's wife Libbie and his daughter Sharon.

Bob Gersten's son Richard became Brant Lake Camp's executive director in 1998. Richard Gersten's wife Mieks began running the Dance Camp.

Gersten died in 2019 at the age of 100. Meltzer died in 2021 at the age of 86.

Brant Lake Camp continues to be operated by the same family that started it. It calls itself the oldest family-run overnight camp in the United States.

=== Child sexual abuse ===
In July 2018, Dylan T. Stolz was arrested for five counts of child sex abuse committed on children less than 11 years old. Stolz had worked at Brant Lake Camp for 33 years. Several months before the arrest, a camp counselor at Brant Lake Camp emailed the camp's director Richie Gersten to alert him about inappropriate behavior by Stoltz, but Gersten took no action afterward. Other camp counselors knew about Stoltz's sexual abuse and told another senior camp counselor, who told them not to worry and assured them it was not their concern.

After the first child told that Stolz had molested him, many other children came forward to tell about how Stoltz had molested them too. By January 2019, the district attorney had increased the charges to 27 counts of sexually abusing campers as young as 8 years old in the camp's showers, bunks, and his own room. The district attorney had 400 pages of evidence. Stoltz pled not guilty to the charges.

At the trial, a child testified that Stoltz had fondled his genitals during the first week of camp. The child had written a letter to his parents describing what had happened, which led to an investigation and arrest of Stolz by the New York State Police. Another child testified that Stoltz had sexually abused him in the shower during two consecutive summers. A total of 10 children said that Stoltz had sexually abused them between 2015 and 2018.

Stoltz was found guilty of the charges and convicted to 4 1/2 years in state prison, followed by 10 years on parole, and will be required to be registered as a sex offender. After the conviction, a 48-year-old former camper said that Stoltz had forced him to perform oral sex on him when he was 9 years old. One of Stoltz's victims committed suicide. A man said that he was repeatedly sexually abused at Brant Lake Camp in 1960, which he reported to the camp but the camp took no action.

Brant Lake Camp was later sued by the family of an 11-year-old victim of Stoltz. The family stated that the 11-year-old had sustained physical and traumatic injuries from Stoltz and that Brant Lake Camp was liable. In response, Brant Lake Camp filed a statement in court saying that the 11-year-old victim "failed to take reasonable precautions for his own safety and otherwise failed to take reasonable action to mitigate or minimize his alleged damages". Brant Lake Camp's insurance company decided to pay the family in order for them to drop the lawsuit.

== Accreditations and Recommendations ==
Brant Lake Camp is accredited by the American Camp Association, whose accreditation standards focus on areas such as health, safety, risk management, and camp operations. ACA accreditation reflects a voluntary review process and public commitment to recognized camp industry standards.

The camp has also been vetted and recommended by American Summer Camps, an organization that helps families identify summer camps for their children and assists prospective staff in finding camp employment opportunities. Brant Lake Camp has been highlighted on the ASC website for its sports-focused program and single-family ownership.
