= Chester, Warren County, New York =

Town in New York, United States

Chester
- Town
- Town of Chester
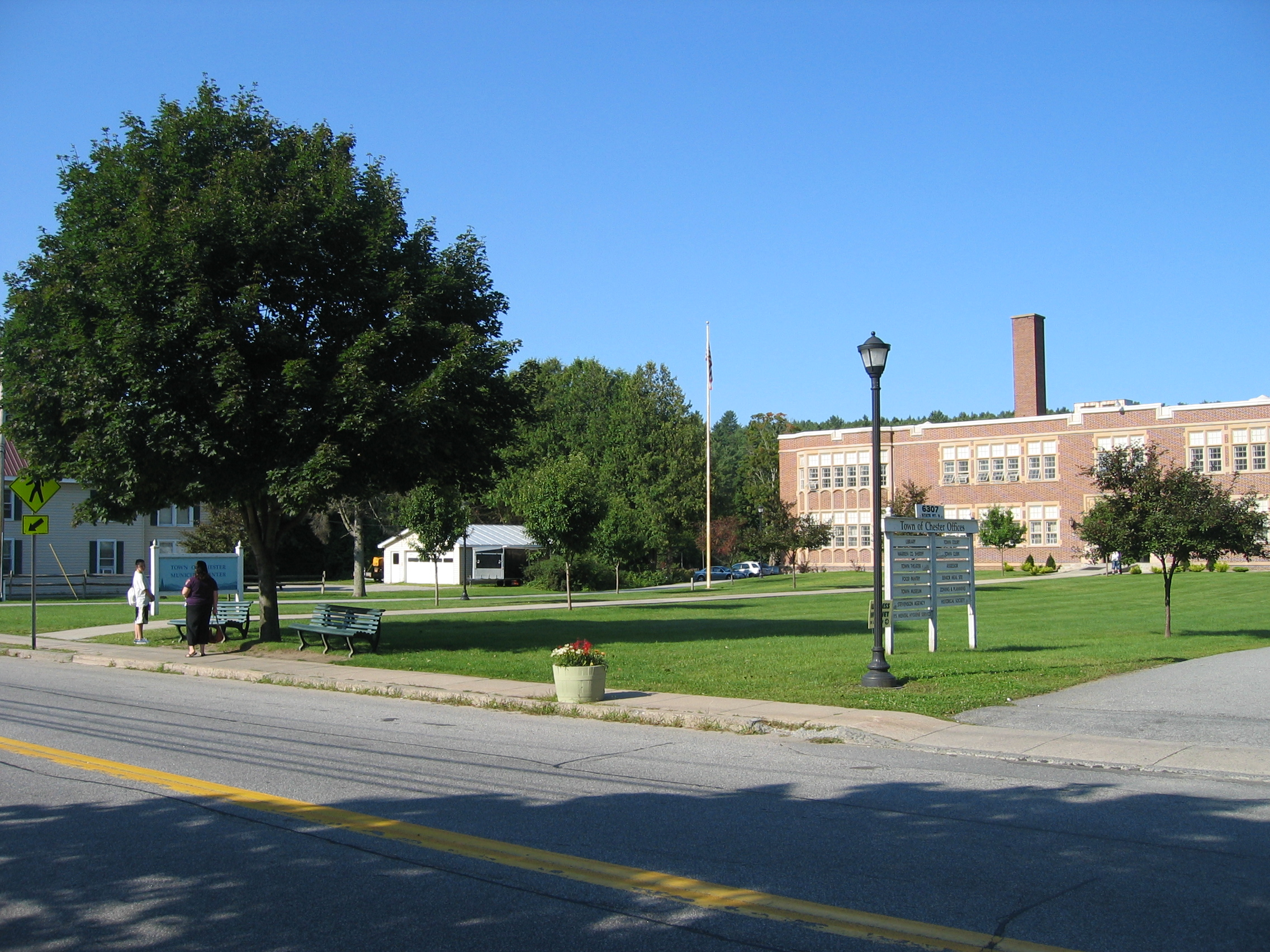
- Town Hall, located in Chestertown

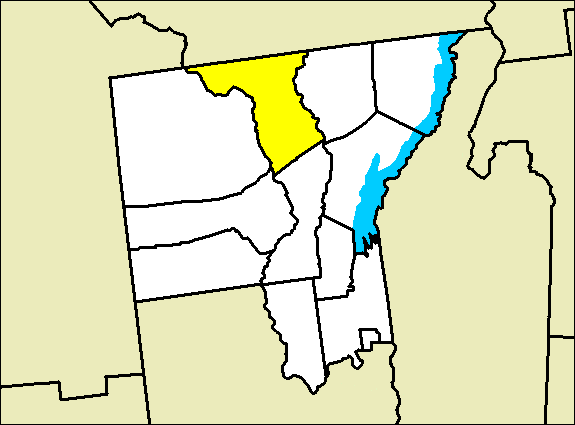
- Location of Chester in Warren County

- Location within the state of New York
- Coordinates: 43°40′37″N 73°50′50″W
- Country: United States
- State: New York
- County: Warren

Government
  - Type: Civil township

Area
  - Total: 87.1 sq mi (225.6 km^{2})
  - Land: 84.4 sq mi (218.7 km^{2})
  - Water: 2.6 sq mi (6.8 km^{2})
- Elevation: 1,096 ft (334 m)

Population (2020)
  - Total: 3,086
- Time zone: UTC-5 (Eastern (EST))
  - Summer (DST): UTC-4 (EDT)
- FIPS code: 36-15319
- GNIS feature ID: 0978823
- Website: www.townofchesterny.org

Chester is a town in Warren County, New York, United States. It is part of the Glens Falls metropolitan area. The population was 3,086 at the 2020 census. The town contains the communities of Chestertown and Pottersville.

The town of Chester is on the county's northern border.

== History ==
Settlement began around 1794. The town of Chester was formed from part of the Town of Thurman in 1799.

== Geography ==
According to the United States Census Bureau, the town has a total area of 87.1 square miles (226 km^{2}), of which 84.5 square miles (219 km^{2}) is land and 2.6 square miles (6.7 km^{2}) (3.03%) is water.

Chester is situated in the Adirondack Park, and the northern town line is the border of Essex County, New York.

== Demographics ==
Historical population
Census	Pop.	Note	%±
1820	1,013		—
1830	1,284		26.8%
1840	1,633		27.2%
1850	1,850		13.3%
1860	2,411		30.3%
1870	2,329		−3.4%
1880	2,247		−3.5%
1890	2,173		−3.3%
1900	2,052		−5.6%
1910	1,721		−16.1%
1920	1,572		−8.7%
1930	1,610		2.4%
1940	1,825		13.4%
1950	1,927		5.6%
1960	1,974		2.4%
1970	2,330		18.0%
1980	2,909		24.8%
1990	3,465		19.1%
2000	3,614		4.3%
2010	3,355		−7.2%
2020	3,086		−8.0%
U.S. Decennial Census

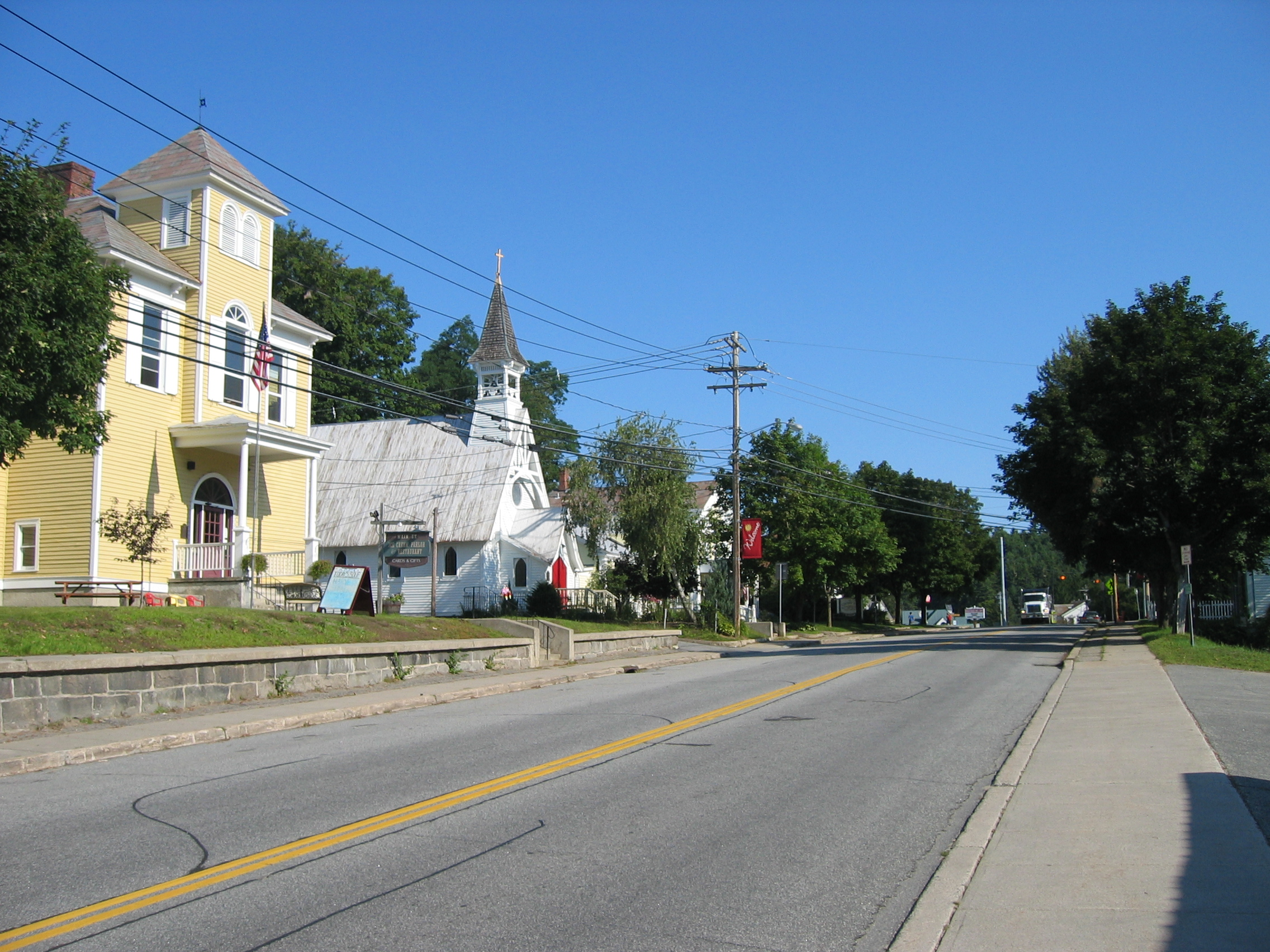
Main Street in Chestertown, town's primary community

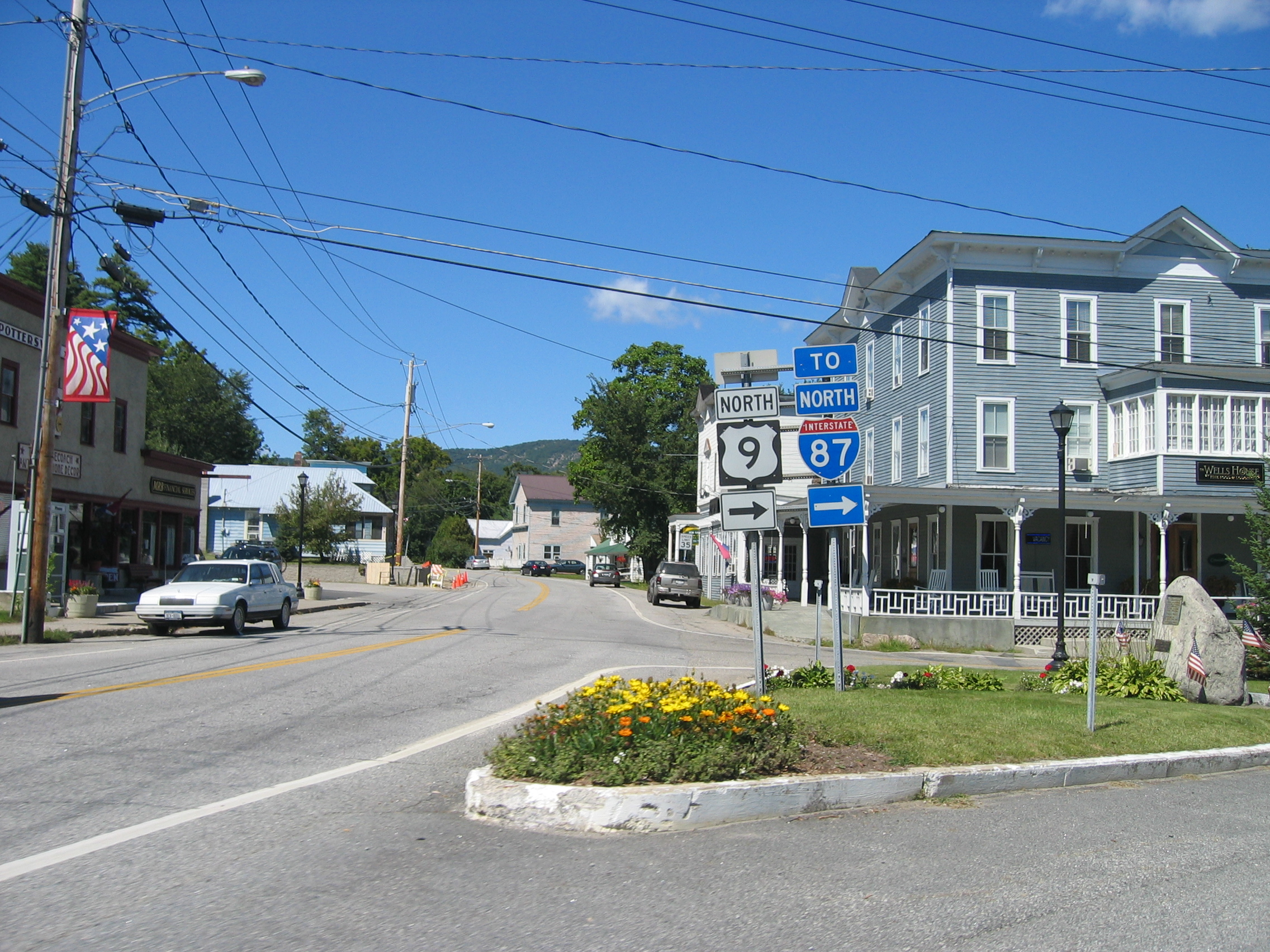
Center of Pottersville, town's second largest community

As of the census of 2000, there were 3,614 people, 1,280 households, and 889 families residing in the town. The population density was 42.8 inhabitants per square mile (16.5/km^{2}). There were 2,418 housing units at an average density of 28.6 per square mile (11.0/km^{2}). The racial makeup of the town was 97.73% White, 0.19% African American, 0.14% Native American, 0.64% Asian, 0.36% from other races, and 0.94% from two or more races. 1.05% of the population were Hispanic or Latino.

There were 1,280 households, out of which 26.9% had children under the age of 18 living with them, 57.7% were married couples living together, 8.7% had a female householder with no husband present, and 30.5% were non-families. 24.8% of all households were made up of individuals, and 11.7% had someone living alone who was 65 years of age or older. The average household size was 2.43 and the average family size was 2.90.

In the town, the population was spread out, with 19.9% under the age of 18, 18.3% from 18 to 24, 21.8% from 25 to 44, 24.5% from 45 to 64, and 15.5% who were 65 years of age or older. The median age was 37 years. For every 100 females, there were 96.7 males. For every 100 females age 18 and over, there were 93.7 males.

The median income for a household in the town was $37,452, and the median income for a family was $42,473. Males had a median income of $30,355 versus $21,740 for females. The per capita income for the town was $16,740. About 8.4% of families and 12.5% of the population were below the poverty line, including 22.2% of those under age 18 and 8.6% of those age 65 or over.

== Industry ==
Peckham Materials Corporation, a manufacturer of asphalt and crushed stone, operates a large quarry at the southern end of the town.

Lincoln Logs Ltd., a manufacturer of log, timber, and cedar homes, operates a large mill in the hamlet of Chestertown.

== School district ==
Town of Chester and Town of Horicon together established North Warren Central School District, which serves residents of both towns.

== Communities and locations in Chester ==
=== Communities and inhabited locations ===
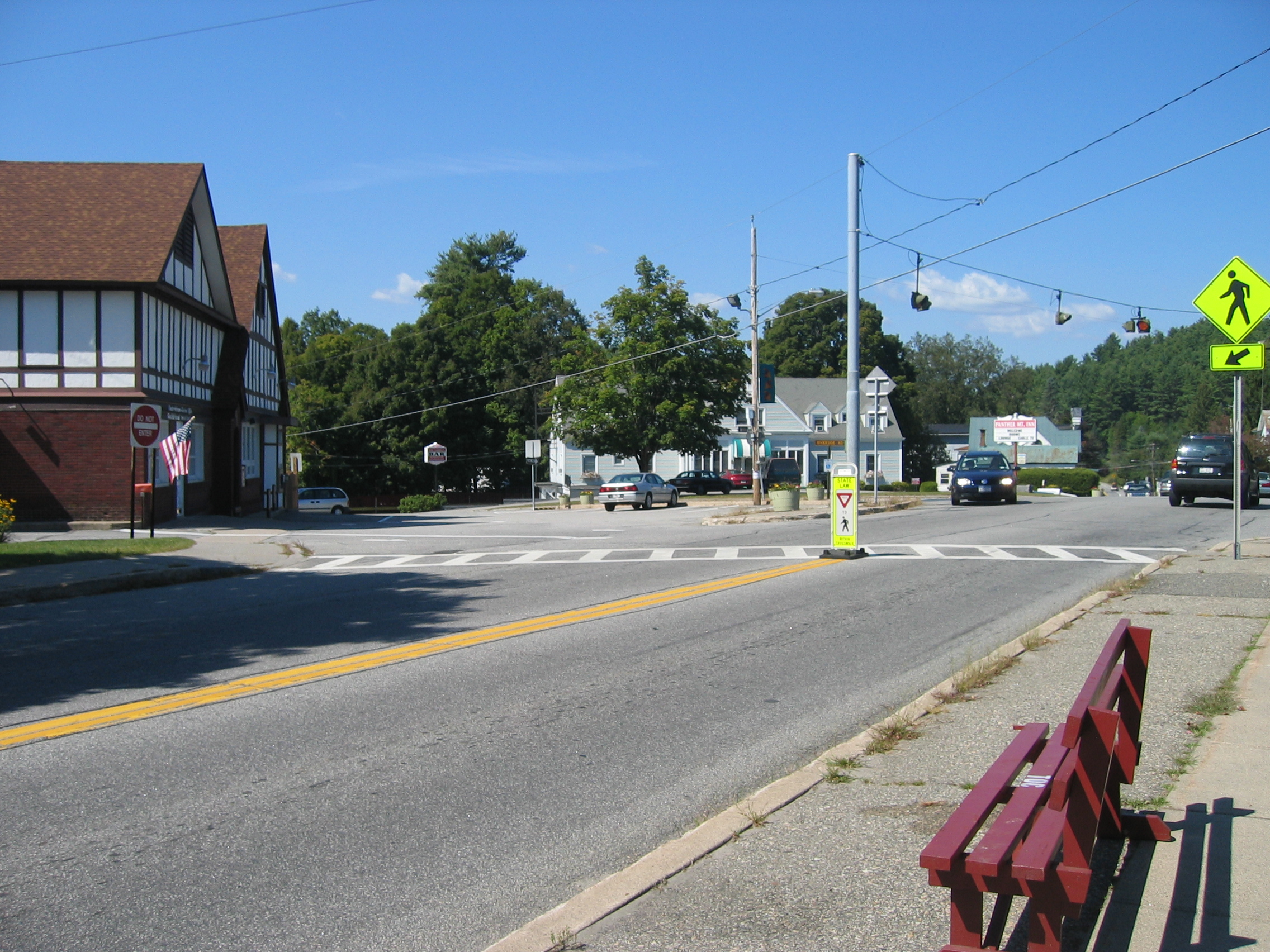
Chestertown central junction called Chester Four Corners

- Chestertown – This hamlet is the major community in the Town of Chester and it is located in the south part of the town by the junction of Route 8 and U.S. Route 9. The town hall, North Warren Central School, and most of the town's business, culture and industry is located in this hamlet.
- Darrowsville – A hamlet by the southern town line.
- Igerna – A hamlet in the northern part of the town.
- Pottersville – A hamlet at the foot of Schroon Lake. It is the second largest community in the town. This hamlet has been assigned ZIP code 12860.
- Riparius – A hamlet by the western town line.

=== Geographical and similar locations ===
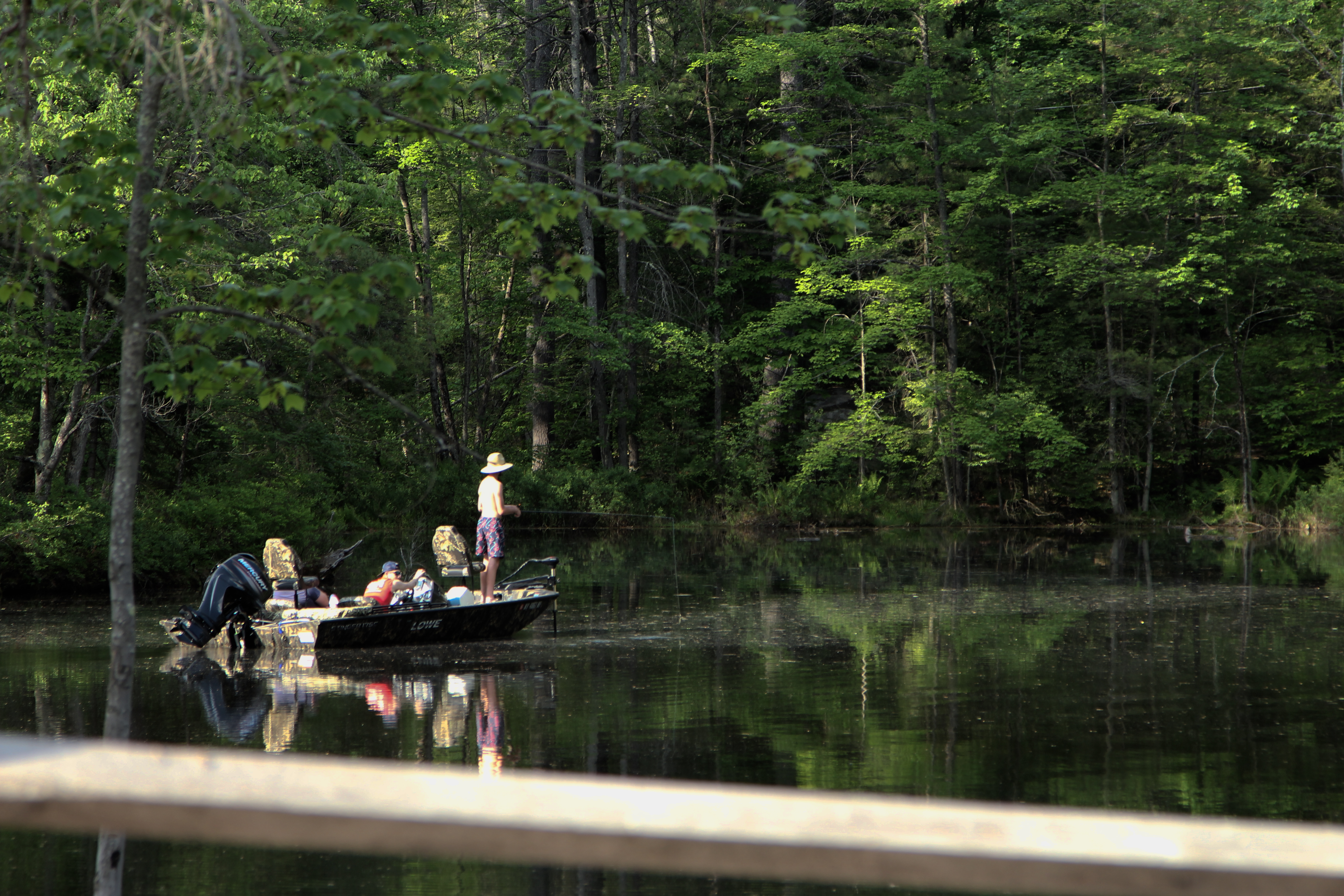
Boaters on a lake off New York State Route 8 in Chester, New York, May 31, 2022.

- Byrnes Corners – A location near the northern town line.
- Friends Lake – A lake in the southern section of the town, southwest of Chestertown.
- Loon Lake – A lake in the southern part of the town, west of Chestertown.
- Palmer Pond – A lake located south of Loon Lake.
- Schroon Lake – A large lake partly in the eastern part of the town.

== Notable person ==
- Matthew Beebe, Wisconsin businessman and legislator; was born in Warren.
