= Matthew Beebe =

American businessman and politician

Matthew P. Beebe (September 4, 1833 – October 27, 1901) was an American businessman and politician.

Born in Chester, New York in Warren County, Beebe moved to Portville, New York in 1851. Then, in 1852, Beebe moved to Mineral Point, Wisconsin and finally to Wausau. Beebe was in the logging and lumber business. In 1889, Beebe served in the Wisconsin State Assembly and was a Democrat. Beebe died in Wausau, Wisconsin.
