= Chestertown Historic District (Chestertown, New York) =

Historic district in New York, United States

- U.S. National Register of Historic Places
- U.S. Historic district
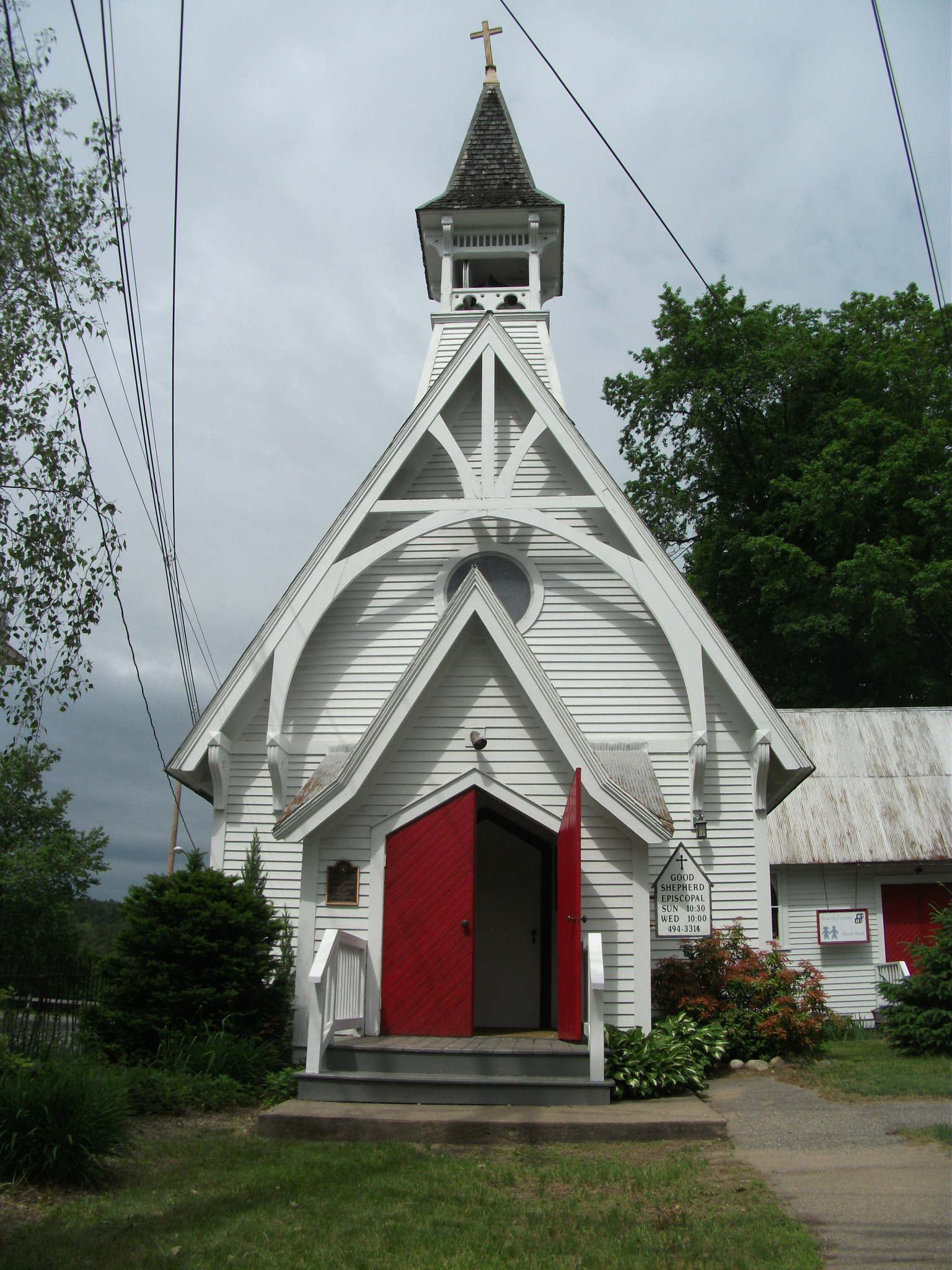
- Church of the Good Shepard, June 2011

- Location within New York Location within the United States
- Location: Canada Dr. (U.S. 9), Chestertown, New York
- Coordinates: 43°39′7″N 73°48′5″W
- Area: 2.5 acres (1.0 ha)
- Built: 1845
- Architect: Multiple
- Architectural style: Greek Revival
- NRHP reference No.: 77000984 (original); 100012369 (increase)

Significant dates
- Added to NRHP: August 22, 1977
- Boundary increase: December 4, 2025

Chestertown Historic District is a national historic district located at Chestertown, Warren County, New York. It includes seven contributing buildings. It includes the Fowler Homestead and related outbuildings, the Church of the Good Shepherd (1884, addition 1954), Chester Town Hall, the Fowler cemetery, and centennial monument (1913). The Fowler Homestead is a Greek Revival style home constructed in the mid-1840s.

It was added to the National Register of Historic Places in 1977.
