= Loon Lake (Warren County, New York) =

Lake in New York, United States

- Location within New York Location within the United States
- Location: Warren County, New York
- Coordinates: 43°40′46″N 73°51′29″W
- Type: Reservoir
- Primary outflows: Chester Creek
- Basin countries: United States
- Surface area: 593 acres (2.40 km^{2})
- Average depth: 15 ft (4.6 m)
- Max. depth: 32 ft (9.8 m)
- Shore length^{1}: 11.2 miles (18.0 km)
- Surface elevation: 868 ft (265 m)
- Islands: 2 Blythewood Island, Schropfer Island
- Settlements: Pottersville, New York
- ^{1} Shore length is not a well-defined measure.

Loon Lake is a wishbone-shaped body of water in Warren County, New York, United States. It is located within the Town of Chester, which maintains the beach. Fishing and boating are popular activities. Common fish species within the lake include pumpkinseed sunfish, walleye, rock bass, tiger muskie, yellow perch, smallmouth bass, largemouth bass, northern pike, bluegill, common rudd and brown bullhead. The lake has its own marina, where boats may be launched and docked for a fee. It is possible to rent speedboats, pontoon boats, canoes and paddle boards. The marina has its own bait and tackle/quick mart. It is open from May to September. The marina is located off the lakes main road, Marina Road.
