= Horicon, New York =

Horicon
- Town
- Town of Horicon
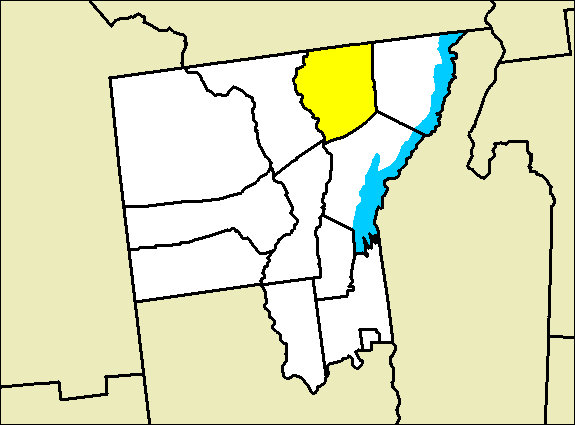
- Location of Horicon in Warren County

- Location within the state of New York
- Coordinates: 43°42′18″N 73°44′7″W
- Country: United States
- State: New York
- County: Warren

Area
  - Total: 71.87 sq mi (186.13 km^{2})
  - Land: 65.77 sq mi (170.34 km^{2})
  - Water: 6.10 sq mi (15.80 km^{2})
- Elevation: 804 ft (245 m)

Population (2010)
  - Total: 1,389
  - Estimate (2016): 1,358
  - Density: 20.6/sq mi (7.97/km^{2})
- Time zone: UTC-5 (Eastern (EST))
  - Summer (DST): UTC-4 (EDT)
- ZIP code: 12815
- Area code: 518
- FIPS code: 36-35639
- GNIS feature ID: 0979076

Horicon is a town in Warren County, New York, United States. It is part of the Glens Falls Metropolitan Statistical Area. Horicon's population was 1,389 at the 2010 census.

Horicon is on the county's northern border and is located inside the Adirondack Park.

== History ==
Horicon was first settled around 1800. The town was formed in 1838 from parts of the towns of Hague and Bolton.

== Geography ==
According to the United States Census Bureau, the town has a total area of 71.8 square miles (186 km^{2}), of which 66.1 square miles (171 km^{2}) is land and 5.7 square miles (15 km^{2}) (7.98%) is water.

The northern town line is the border of Essex County, New York.

New York State Route 8 crosses the town, forming a major east–west highway.

The town is also the site of the Curtis S. Read Scout Reservation, a Boy Scout camp owned by the Westchester-Putnam Council of Hawthorne.

== Demographics ==
Historical population
Census	Pop.	Note	%±
1840	659		—
1850	1,152		74.8%
1860	1,542		33.9%
1870	1,500		−2.7%
1880	1,633		8.9%
1890	1,582		−3.1%
1900	1,136		−28.2%
1910	1,001		−11.9%
1920	754		−24.7%
1930	800		6.1%
1940	850		6.3%
1950	791		−6.9%
1960	833		5.3%
1970	890		6.8%
1980	1,082		21.6%
1990	1,269		17.3%
2000	1,479		16.5%
2010	1,389		−6.1%
2016 (est.)	1,358		−2.2%
U.S. Decennial Census

As of the census of 2000, there were 1,479 people, 642 households, and 446 families residing in the town. The population density was 22.4 inhabitants per square mile (8.6/km^{2}). There were 1,767 housing units at an average density of 26.7 per square mile (10.3/km^{2}). The racial makeup of the town was 98.58% White, 0.20% African American, 0.20% Native American, 0.20% Asian, 0.20% from other races, and 0.61% from two or more races. Hispanic or Latino of any race were 0.47% of the population.

There were 642 households, out of which 23.8% had children under the age of 18 living with them, 59.3% were married couples living together, 5.9% had a female householder with no husband present, and 30.4% were non-families. 26.5% of all households were made up of individuals, and 12.9% had someone living alone who was 65 years of age or older. The average household size was 2.30 and the average family size was 2.74.

In the town, the population was spread out, with 20.6% under the age of 18, 5.2% from 18 to 24, 23.2% from 25 to 44, 32.0% from 45 to 64, and 19.0% who were 65 years of age or older. The median age was 46 years. For every 100 females, there were 100.1 males. For every 100 females age 18 and over, there were 98.3 males.

As of 2015, the estimated median income per household was $65,804, and the median income for a family was $71,518. The per capita income for the town was $35,597. 5.3% of families and 9.5% of the population were estimated as below the poverty line, including 26% of those under age 18 and 3.1% of those age 65 or over.

== School district ==
The towns of Horicon and Chester together established North Warren Central School District, which serves residents of both towns.

== Communities and locations in Horicon ==
- Adirondack – a hamlet in the northwestern part of the town, by Schroon Lake. This hamlet has ZIP code 12808.
- Brant Lake – a lake in the central part of the town
- Brant Lake – a hamlet at the western end of the lake, located on Route 8
- Island Pond – a lake located east of the hamlet of Brant Lake
- Long Pond – a lake located east of the hamlet of Brant Lake
- Pottersville – a hamlet near the western town line by Schroon Lake. The majority of this hamlet is located in the Town of Chester. This hamlet has ZIP code 12860
- Schroon Lake – a lake partly in the northwestern part of the town. This hamlet has ZIP code 12870.
- South Horicon – a hamlet in the southwestern part of the town
- Starbuckville – a hamlet west of Brant Lake hamlet
