= Long Pond (Warren County, New York) =

- Location within New York Location within the United States
- Location: Warren County, New York, United States
- Coordinates: 43°40′58″N 73°38′41″W
- Type: Lake
- Basin countries: United States
- Surface area: 31 acres (0.13 km^{2})
- Average depth: 9 feet (2.7 m)
- Max. depth: 38 feet (12 m)
- Shore length^{1}: 1.4 miles (2.3 km)
- Surface elevation: 1,309 feet (399 m)
- Settlements: Brant Lake, New York
- ^{1} Shore length is not a well-defined measure.

Long Pond is located east of Brant Lake, New York. Fish species present in the lake are brook trout, tiger trout, and brown bullhead. There is a carry down trail from Padanaram Road on the south shore.
