= Palmer Pond =

- Location within New York Palmer Pond (the United States)
- Location: Warren County, New York, United States
- Coordinates: 43°38′47″N 73°52′11″W
- Type: Lake
- Basin countries: United States
- Surface area: 32 acres (0.13 km^{2})
- Max. depth: 17 feet (5.2 m)
- Shore length^{1}: .9 miles (1.4 km)
- Surface elevation: 1,184 feet (361 m)
- Settlements: Riparius, New York
- ^{1} Shore length is not a well-defined measure.

Palmer Pond is located southeast of Riparius, New York. Fish species present in the lake are tiger trout, brook trout, rainbow trout, and brown trout. There is a trail off Palmer Road on the south shore.
