= Florida Literacy Coalition, Inc. =

American nonprofit organization

Florida Literacy Coalition
- Formation: 1985
- Legal status: Non-profit Organization
- Headquarters: Orlando, FL
- Region served: Florida
- Executive Director: Gregory Smith
- Website: www.floridaliteracy.org

Established in 1985, the Florida Literacy Coalition (FLC) is a nonprofit organization that promotes, supports and advocates for the effective delivery of quality adult and family literacy services in the state of Florida.

As a statewide umbrella literacy organization and the host of Florida's Adult and Family Literacy Literacy Resource Center, FLC provides a range of services to support more than 300 adult education, ESL, literacy and family literacy providers throughout Florida. Special emphasis is placed on assisting community based literacy organizations with their training and program development need.

== Programs and Services ==
Training and Technical Assistance: FLC offers professional development opportunities which provide literacy practitioners and volunteers with tools and resources to enhance program quality. Focus areas include program management, planning, curriculum development, marketing, fundraising, board development and volunteer tutor training.

Networking and Communications: FLC promotes and facilitates information sharing, networking and collaborative programming among literacy providers through services such as moderated discussion lists, the Florida Literacy Directory and Resource Guide and targeted technical assistance in developing regional literacy coalitions.

Toll Free Literacy Hotline: FLC promotes reading and raises awareness about literacy issues in Florida. A trained referral specialist provides on call information about education programs and volunteer opportunities in communities throughout the state.

Florida Literacy Conference: One of Florida's premier literacy events, this three-day annual conference offers a wide range of training and networking opportunities to literacy practitioners and volunteers. Participants learn about various topics related to adult basic education, literacy, ESOL and family literacy.

The Florida Health Literacy Initiative: Funded by Blue Cross and Blue Shield of Florida and operated by FLC, this program improves the health literacy level of Florida residents by supporting literacy programs with financial, professional development and technical support. This initiative combines ESOL instruction and health education in a multi-disciplinary approach that teaches English to adults and families while helping these individuals acquire skills and knowledge to make informed choices regarding their health and nutrition. With the support of the Florida Department of Education, FLC has also produced the award winning "Staying Healthy" health literacy curricula.

Publications and Resources: FLC provides free reference and outreach materials, serving as a clearinghouse for the distribution of quality resource materials for literacy instructors and administrators.

Internet Resources: In partnership with the National Institute for Literacy's LINCS information system, the Florida Adult and Family Literacy Resource Center's web site offers a portal to access the latest Florida literacy research, statistics, events, curriculum materials, training resources and promising practices from Florida and around the nation.

Statewide Americorps VISTA project: In partnership with the Corporation for National and Community Service, this initiative places full-time service corps volunteers with community literacy programs throughout Florida.

Advocacy: FLC serves as an advocate for community-based literacy programs and quality literacy services statewide.
