= Forest Lake Camp =

Summer camp in upstate New York, U.S.

- Interactive map of Forest Lake Camp
- Location: Chestertown, New York, United States
- Coordinates: 43.563244°N 73.774933°W
- Established: 1926
- Website: www.forestlakecamp.com

Forest Lake Camp (FLC) is a summer camp located just north of Lake George, in the Southern Adirondack Mountains of New York.

== History ==
"Forest Lake Camp for Boys" was opened as a boys-only camp in 1926 by Harold T. Confer, who was the athletic director at Freeport, New York, High School on Long Island. One year before the camp opened, he had bought over 200 acres (0.81 km^{2}) of land around Forest Lake. In the property were a farmhouse and an inn that are still there to this day. The land was originally crossed by an old stagecoach route from Chestertown, New York, to Saratoga Springs, New York.

By 1954 Harold Confer's son Philip began running the camp alongside his wife, Sally. The couple ran the camp for 32 years. During this time, they bought over 200 additional acres on the other side of the lake, thus acquiring all the land surrounding the lake. In 1984 Philip's son Gary took over the camp.

In 1990, the camp stopped being a boys only camp and opened "Forest Lake Camp for Girls". Since then, the camp runs as a “brother-sister” camp, although it is not a true coed camp, since boys and girls cabins are located in different campuses, and both camps have independent programs. Yet on occasions, such as July 4 and campfires, both camps will interact. Older campers interact more often, as one of the programs is drama whereupon both genders participate in plays. At least one dance is held each summer which is another interaction.

The Camp is now owned by the Blanck and Kelly families of Waterbury, VT, and Needham, MA, respectively. FLC is an accredited camp by the American Camp Association. The camp has different programs, ranging from 2 to 7 week programs for boys and girls ages 8–16. Both male and female camp start and end on the same dates.

== Facilities ==
Forest Lake Camp is located on 825 acres (3.34 km^{2}) of land and has 1.5 miles (2.4 km) of shoreline of its 22-acre (89,000 m^{2}) private lake. The camp has 19 camper sleeping cabins with bunk beds as well as several cabins for staff housing and 3 woods cabins for overnight trips. The camp has 2 riding rings, 2 stables, one camp store, a nature center, two activity offices, one infirmary, one craft barn and one nature & science shop. Among its sports related facilities are: 2 softball fields, 2 soccer fields, 2 lacrosse fields, 2 basketball courts, 1 street hockey rink, 4 tennis courts (2 clay and 2 hard court), 2 volleyball courts (one beach volleyball), 2 climbing walls, 6 ping pong tables, 6 tetherball courts, 1 riflery range, 1 Skeet shooting range, 1 dance and yoga pavilion, and 2 archery ranges. The camp also has 2 campfire circles for traditional Sunday Night Campfire, 1 amphitheater a vegetable farm and 25 miles (40 km) of private woodland trails for horseback riding, hiking and mountain biking.

== Notable alumni ==
- Fred Olds
- Emmy Rossum

== See also ==
- Summer camp
- Chestertown, New York
- Lake George
- American Camp Association
