= Chestertown, New York =

Chestertown
- hamlet & CDP
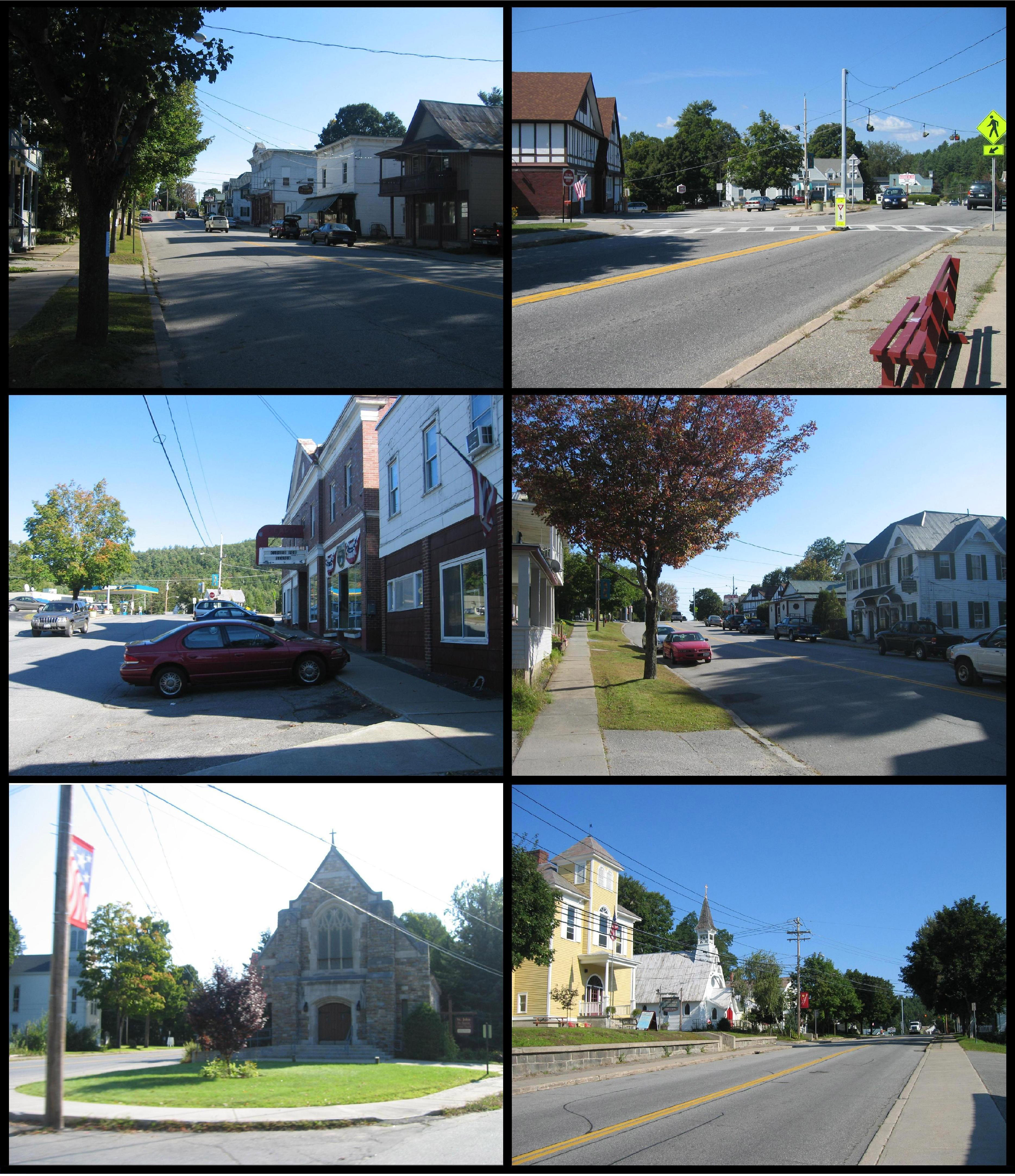

- Location within the state of New York
- Coordinates: 43°39′09″N 073°48′03″W
- Country: United States
- State: New York
- County: Warren County
- Town: Town of Chester

Area
  - Total: 3.86 sq mi (9.99 km^{2})
  - Land: 3.84 sq mi (9.95 km^{2})
  - Water: 0.012 sq mi (0.03 km^{2})
- Elevation: 843 ft (257 m)

Population (2020)
  - Total: 586
  - Density: 152.5/sq mi (58.88/km^{2})
- Time zone: UTC-5 (Eastern (EST))
  - Summer (DST): UTC-4 (EDT)
- ZIP code: 12817
- Area code: 518
- FIPS code: 36-15363
- GNIS feature ID: 946543
- Website: www.townofchesterny.org

Chestertown is a hamlet of the town of Chester, in Warren County, New York, United States. It is located by the junction of Route 8 and U.S. Route 9, in the Adirondack Mountains. The population was 586 as of the 2020 census, which lists the community as a census-designated place.

== History ==
The community was founded in 1799 by New Englanders who built mills along its creeks. The first settlement was established around 1790 and was called Chester Four Corners.

The Chestertown Historic District was added to the National Register of Historic Places in 1977.

== Geography ==
Chestertown is located at 43°39′09″N 073°48′03″W (43.6525664, -73.8009597) and its elevation is 896 feet (273 m). The ZIP code is 12817 and it is in the Eastern Time Zone. The nearest city is Glens Falls.

According to the 2010 United States census, Chestertown has a total area of 3.856 square miles (9.99 km^{2}), of which 3.843 square miles (9.95 km^{2}) is land and 0.013 square miles (0.03 km^{2}) is water.

== Demographics ==
Historical population
Census	Pop.	Note	%±
2020	586		—
U.S. Decennial Census

== Education ==
Children from Chestertown, along with children from the neighboring communities of Adirondack, Brant Lake, and Pottersville, attend North Warren Central School.

== Community and economy ==
The old school in the center of the village was transformed into the community center, with a public library, town hall, and Sheriff's office. There is also a theater and a medical center in the town. Main Street (U.S. Route 9) is lined with many stores. There are several hotels in the area.

The town has one public beach at Loon Lake.

=== Religion ===
There are three churches in the center of Chestertown: the St. John the Baptist Roman Catholic Church of the St. Isaac Jogues Parish Community, the Community United Methodist Church, and the Faith Bible Church. There are also many other churches in the area.

=== Lakes ===
There are three lakes in Chestertown, Friends Lake, Loon Lake, and Forest Lake. Friends and Loon Lakes are surrounded by vacation homes. Forest Lake is privately owned by Forest Lake Camp - a traditional overnight summer camp since 1926.

== Gallery ==
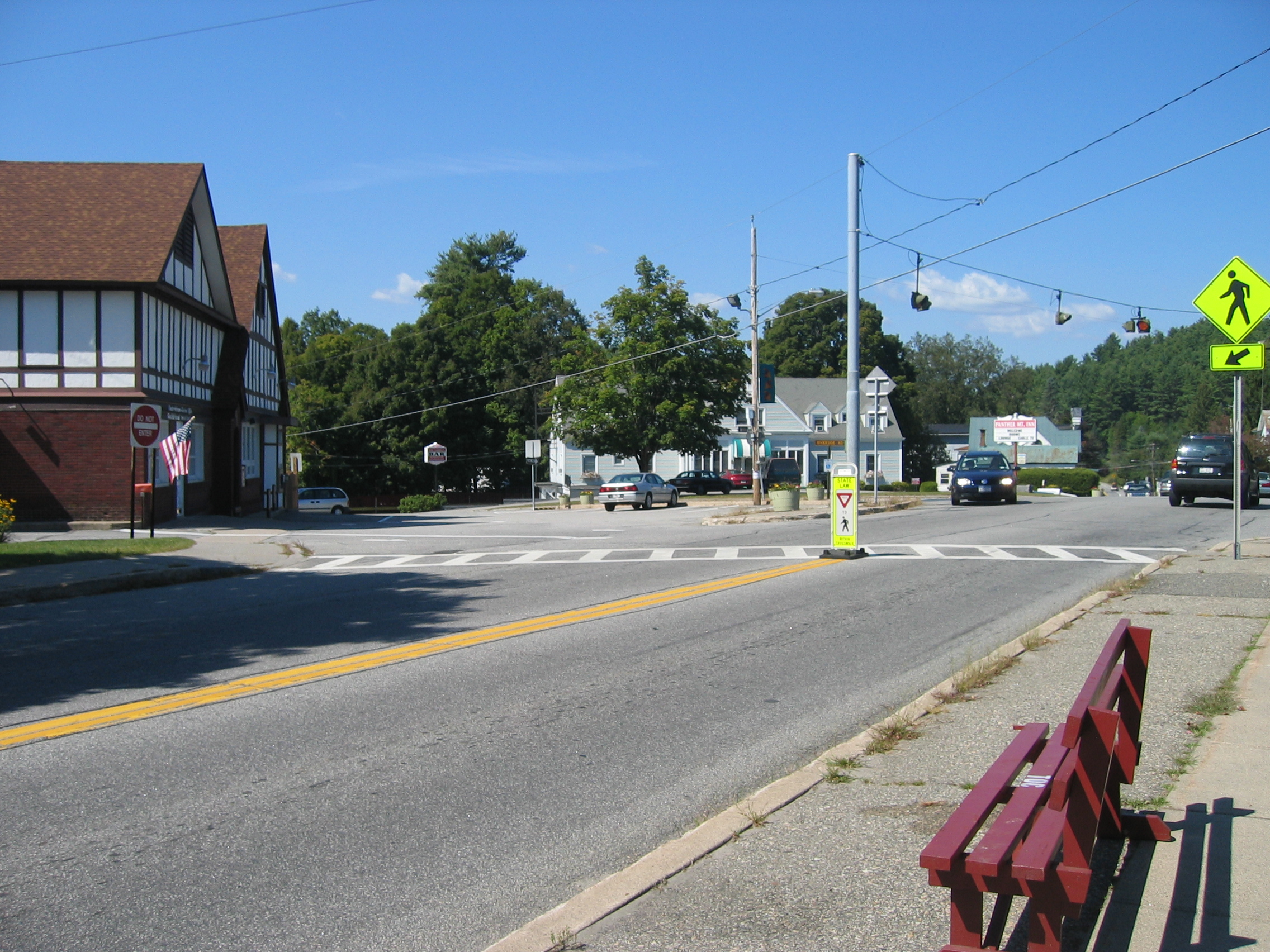
Junction in the town centre called Chester Four Corners

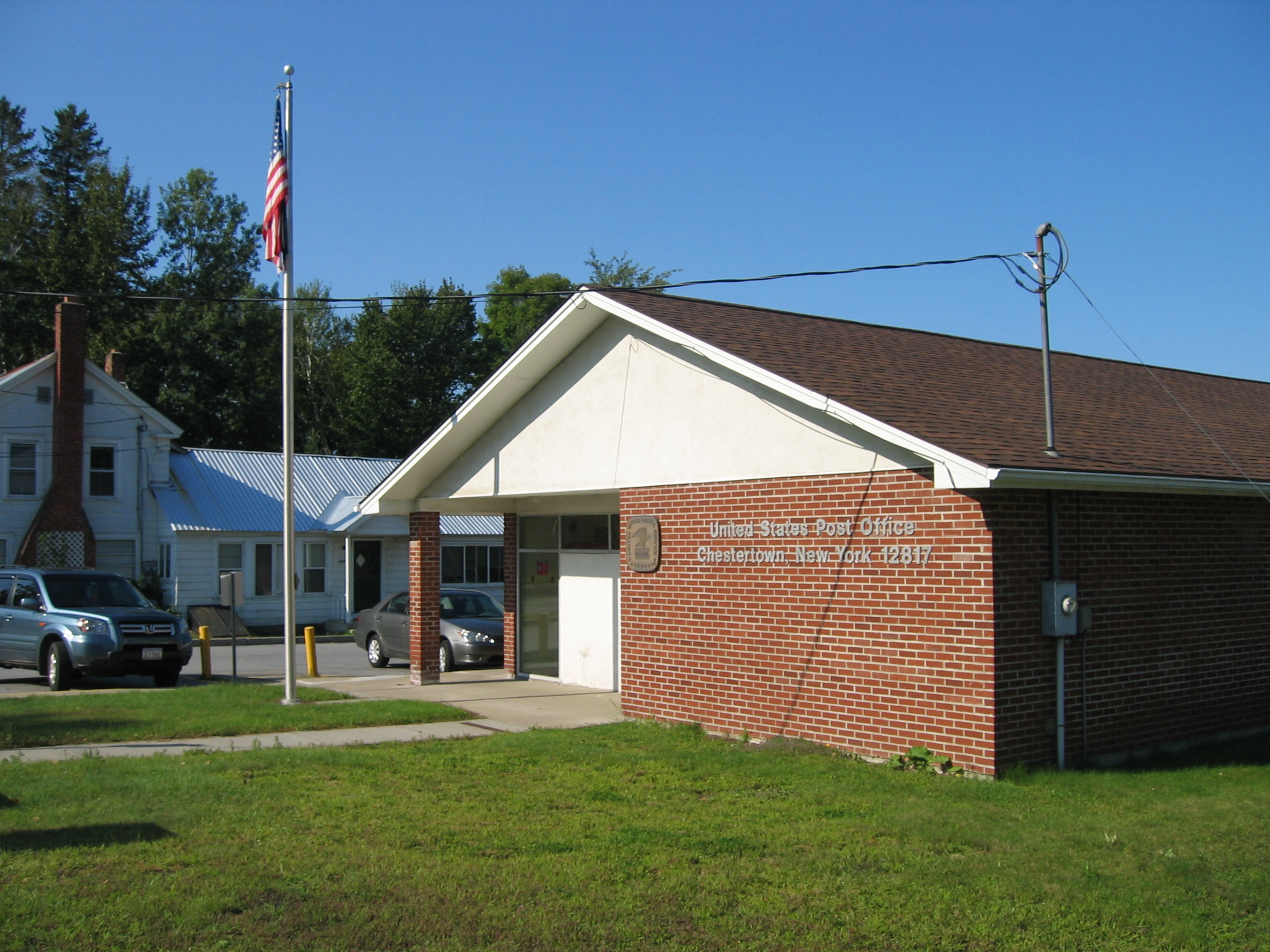
Chestertown Post office

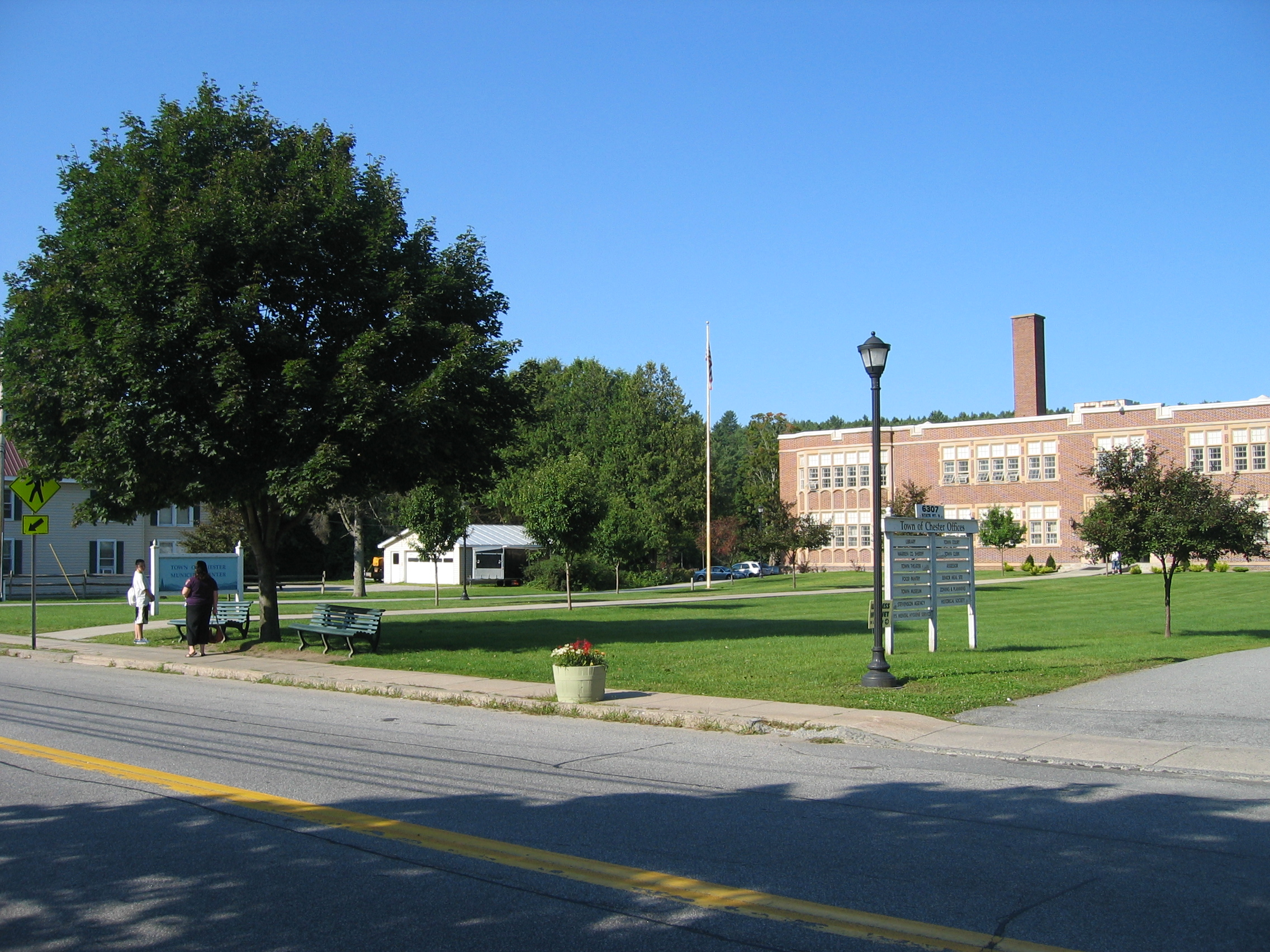
Town of Chester town hall

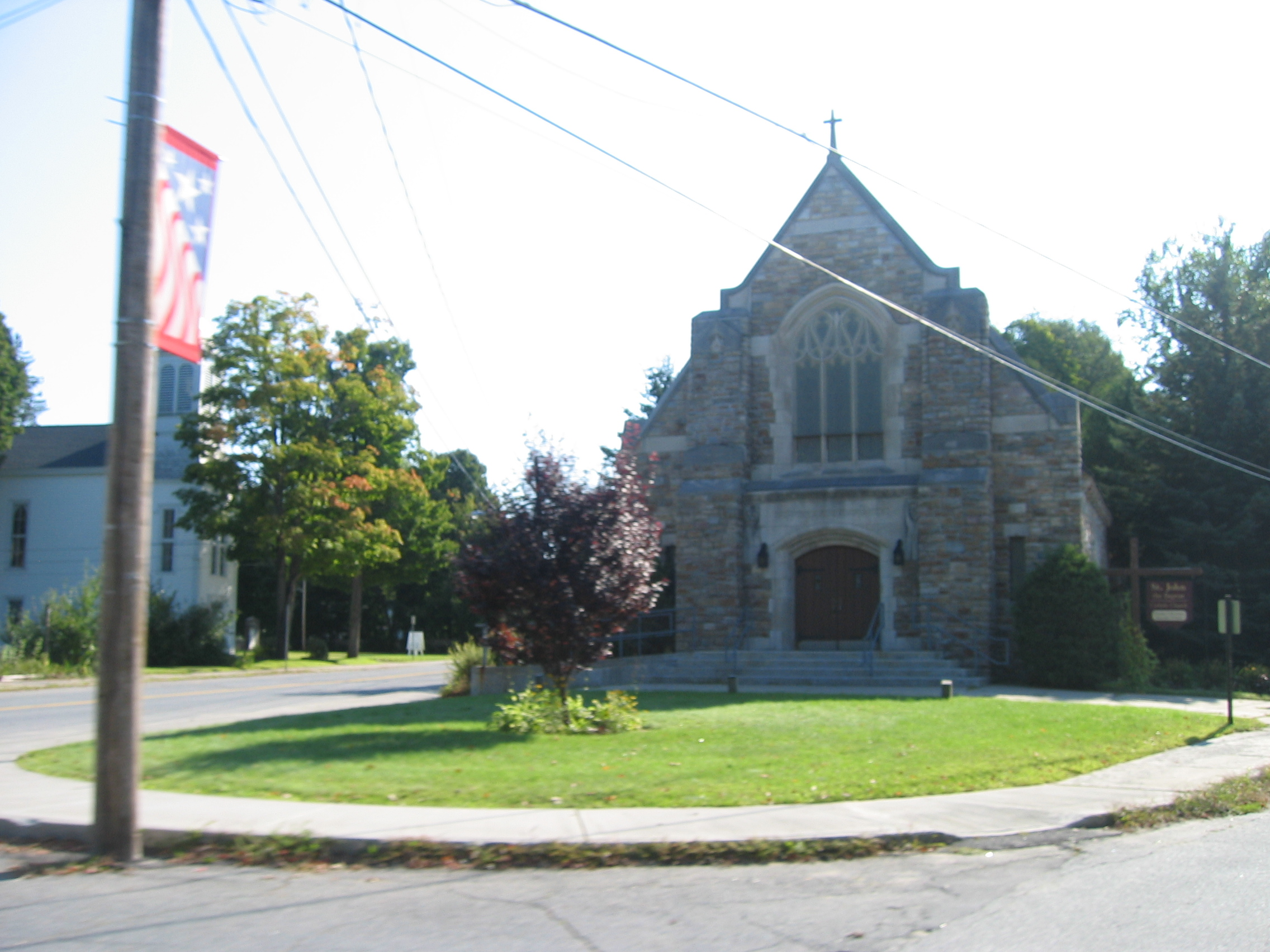
Catholic Church

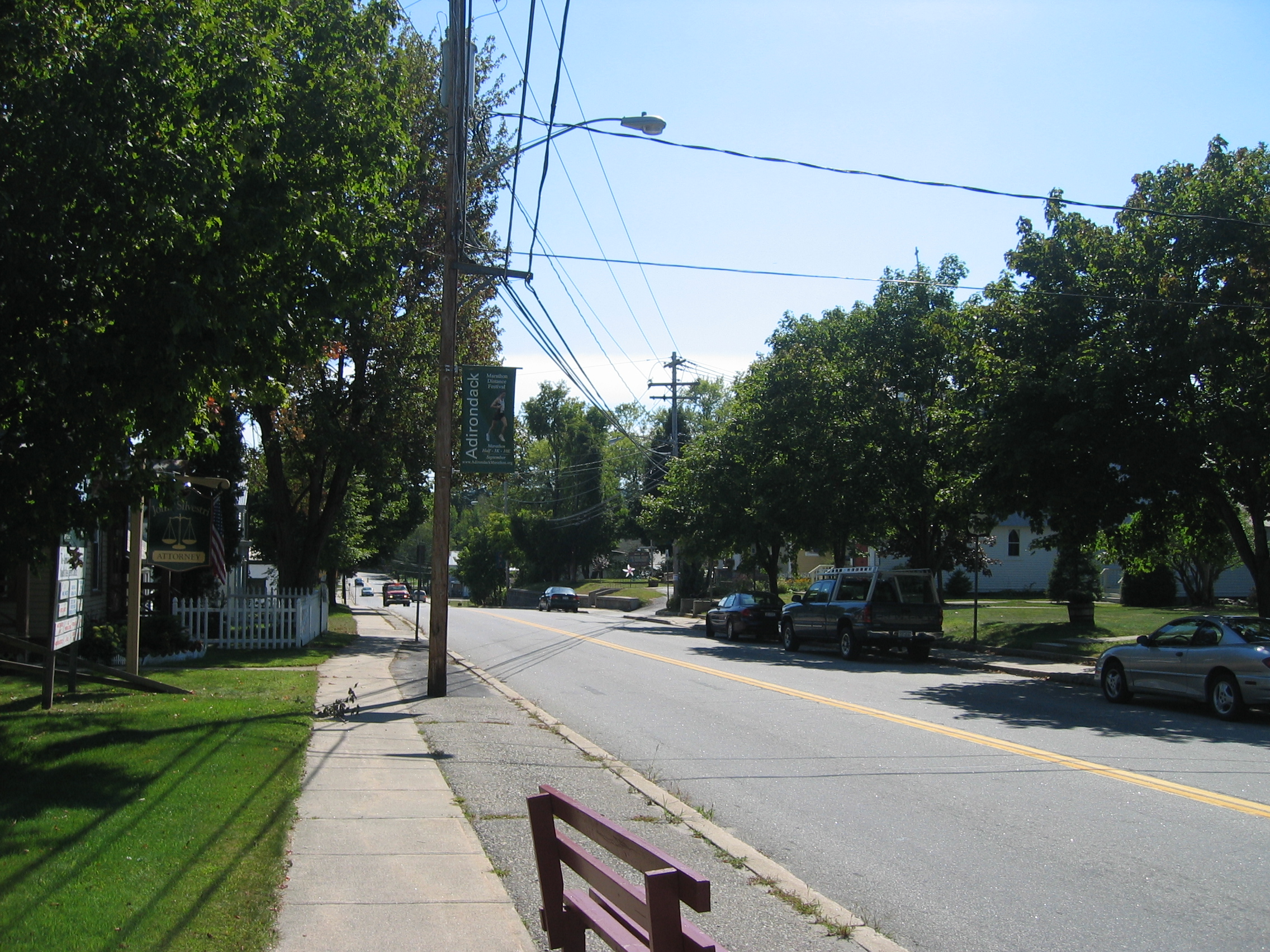
Main Street looking south

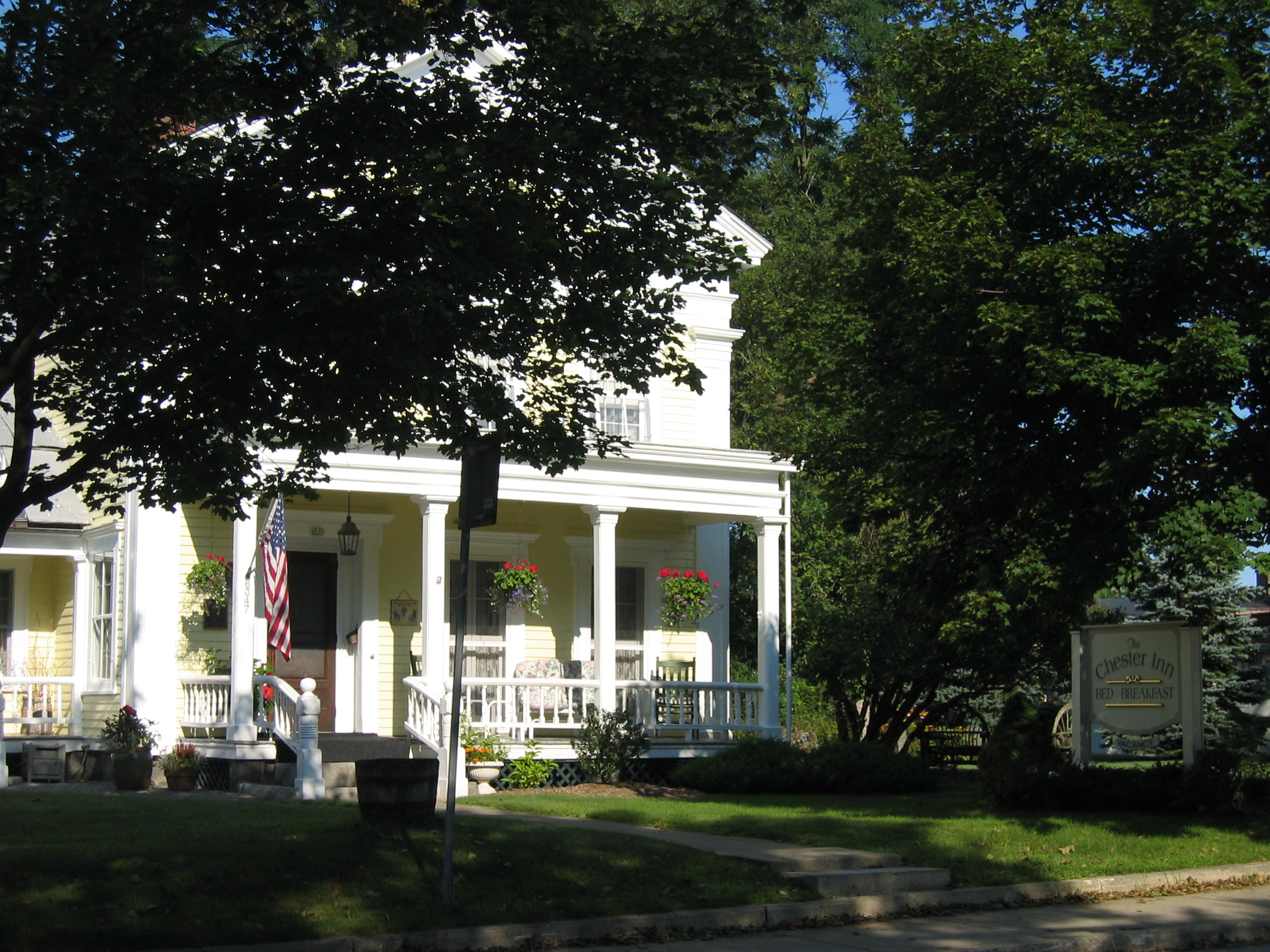
Chester Inn

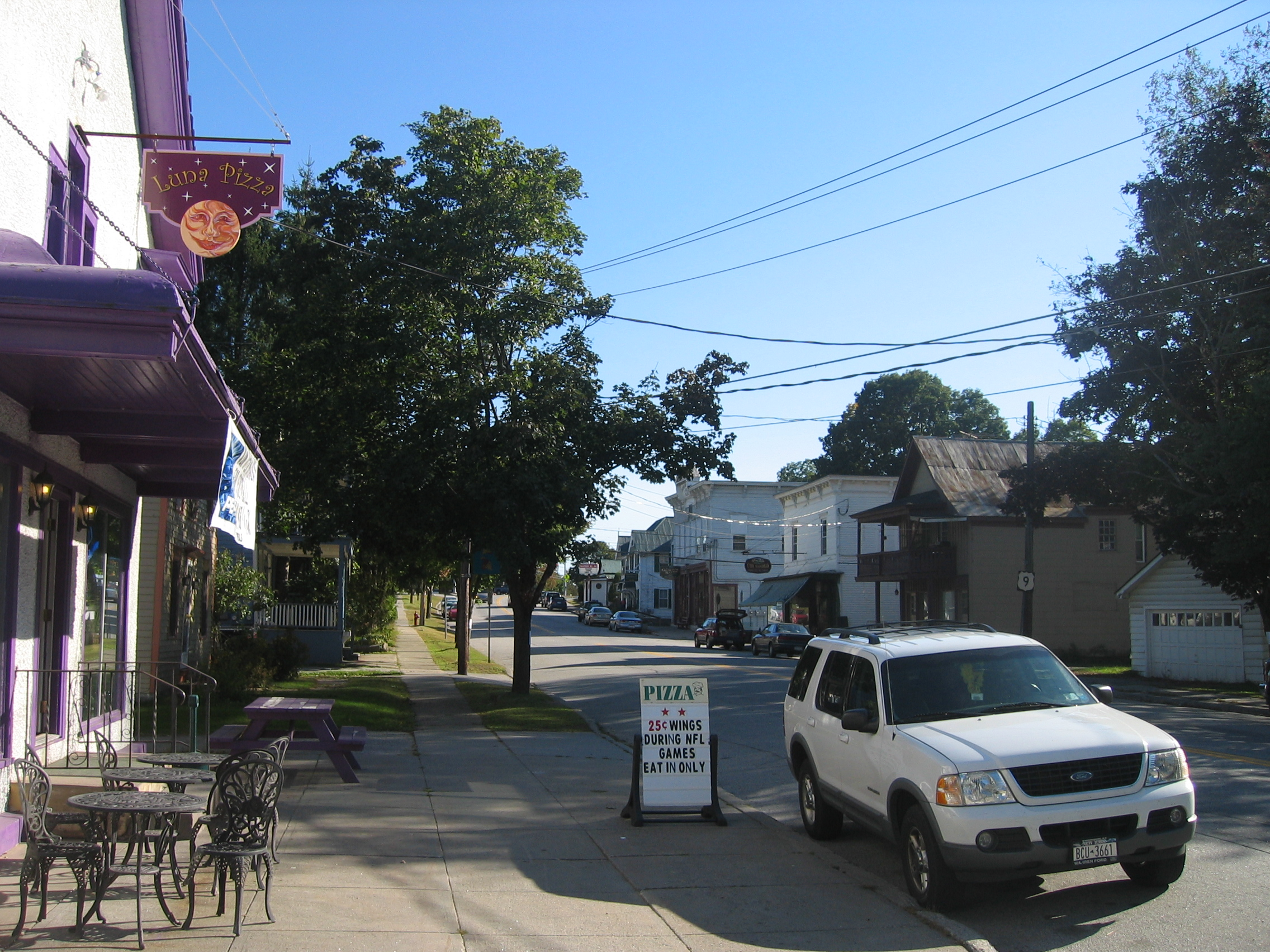
Restaurant on Main St

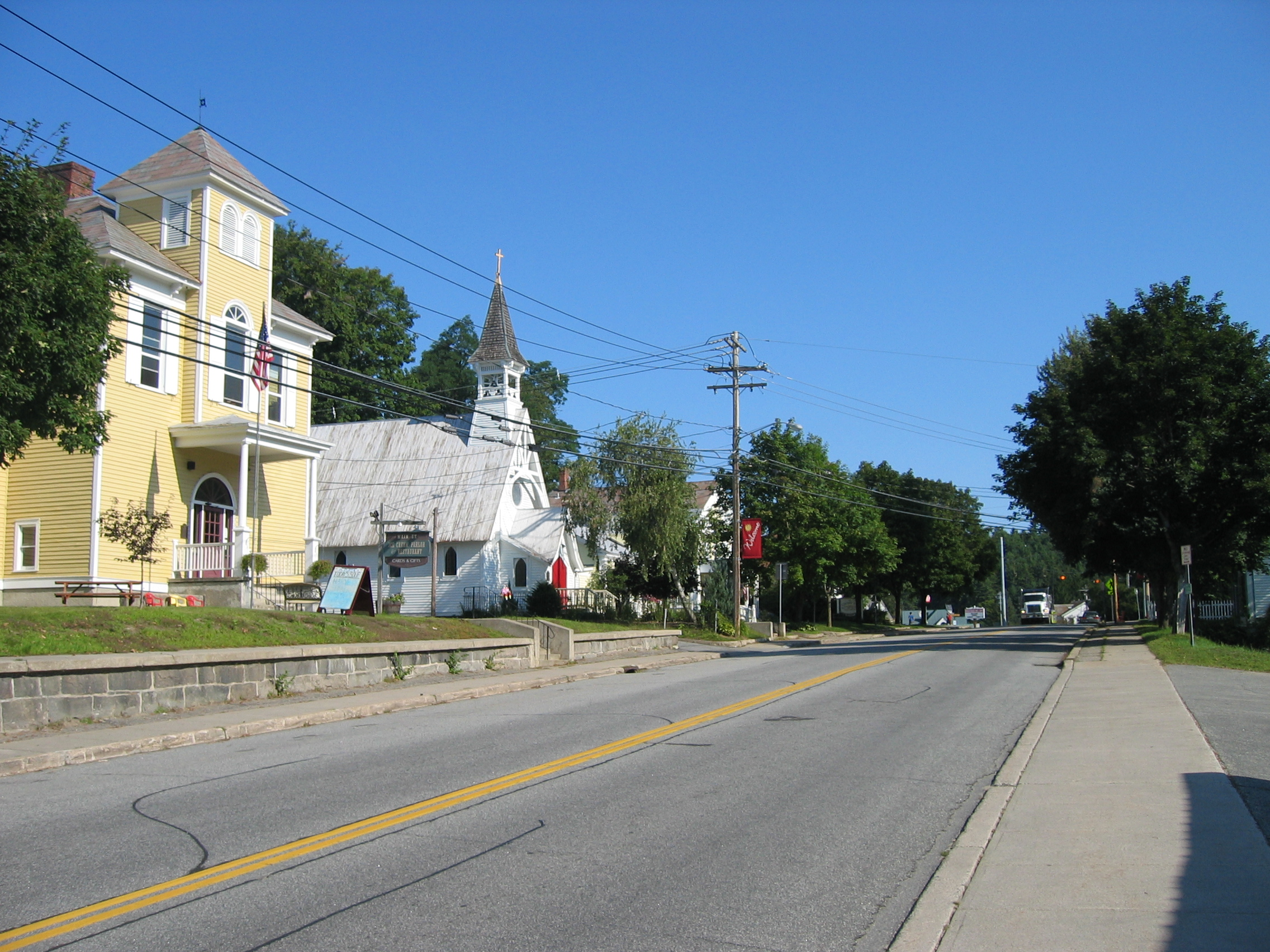
Church in Main St, south of main junction
