= Brant Lake (New York) =

- Location of mouth within New York Brant Lake (the United States)
- Location: Warren County, New York, United States
- Coordinates: 43°42′58″N 73°42′10″W, 43°40′35″N 73°45′03″W
- Type: Lake
- Primary inflows: Lily Pond Brook, Spuytenduivel Brook,
- Primary outflows: Brant Lake Outlet to Schroon River
- Basin countries: United States
- Surface area: 1,522 acres (6.16 km^{2})
- Average depth: 30 feet (9.1 m)
- Max. depth: 65 feet (20 m)
- Shore length^{1}: 16.4 miles (26.4 km)
- Surface elevation: 797 feet (243 m)
- Islands: 5
- Settlements: Brant Lake, New York
- ^{1} Shore length is not a well-defined measure.

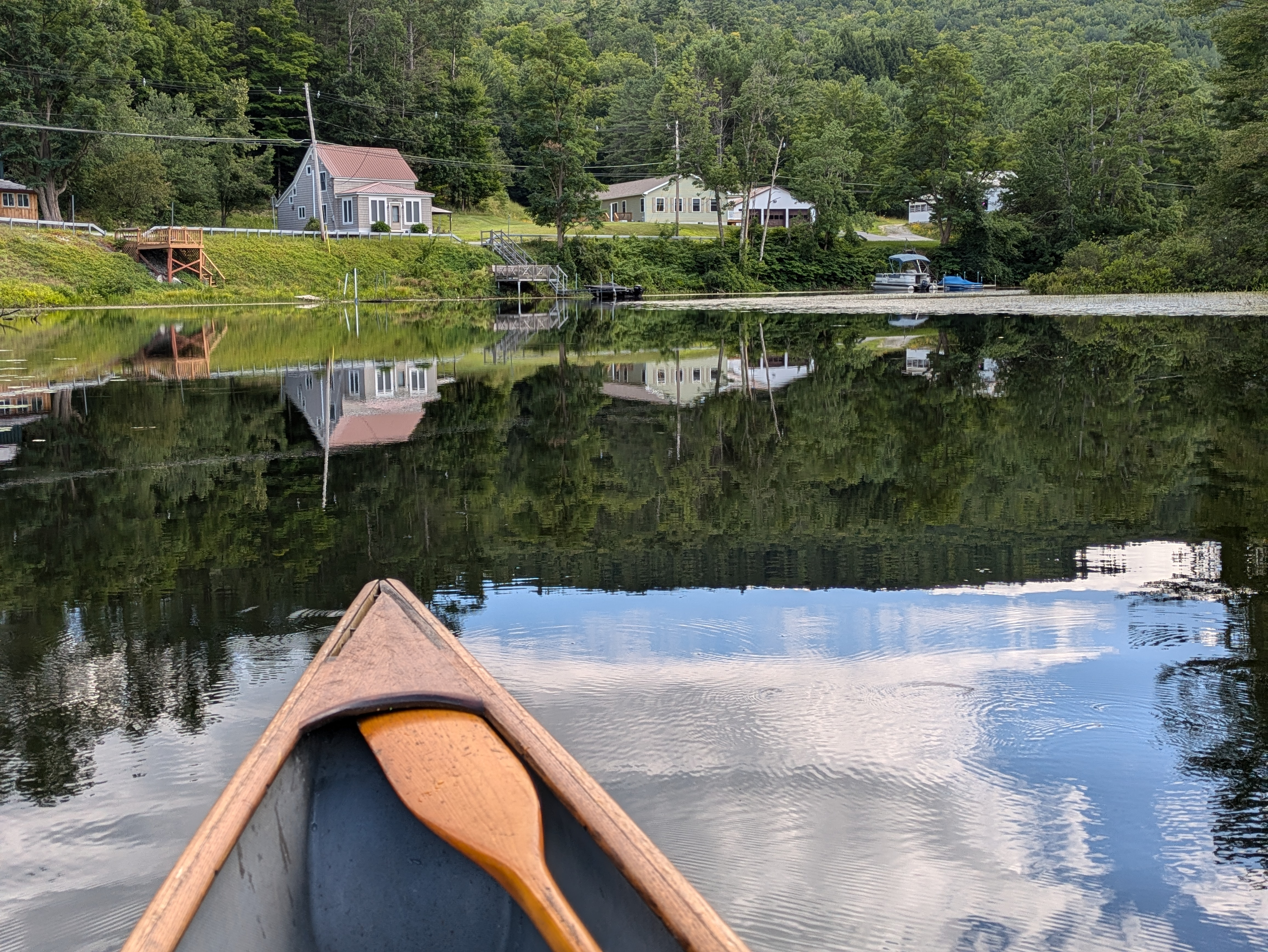
Brant Lake in July, 2024

Brant Lake is located by Brant Lake, New York. Fish species present in the lake are largemouth bass, smallmouth bass, brown trout, yellow perch, chain pickerel, smelt, black crappie, rainbow trout, sunfish, and brown bullhead. There is a state owned hard surface ramp located 1 mile northeast of the hamlet of Brant Lake.
