= Brant Lake, New York =

Brant Lake
- hamlet
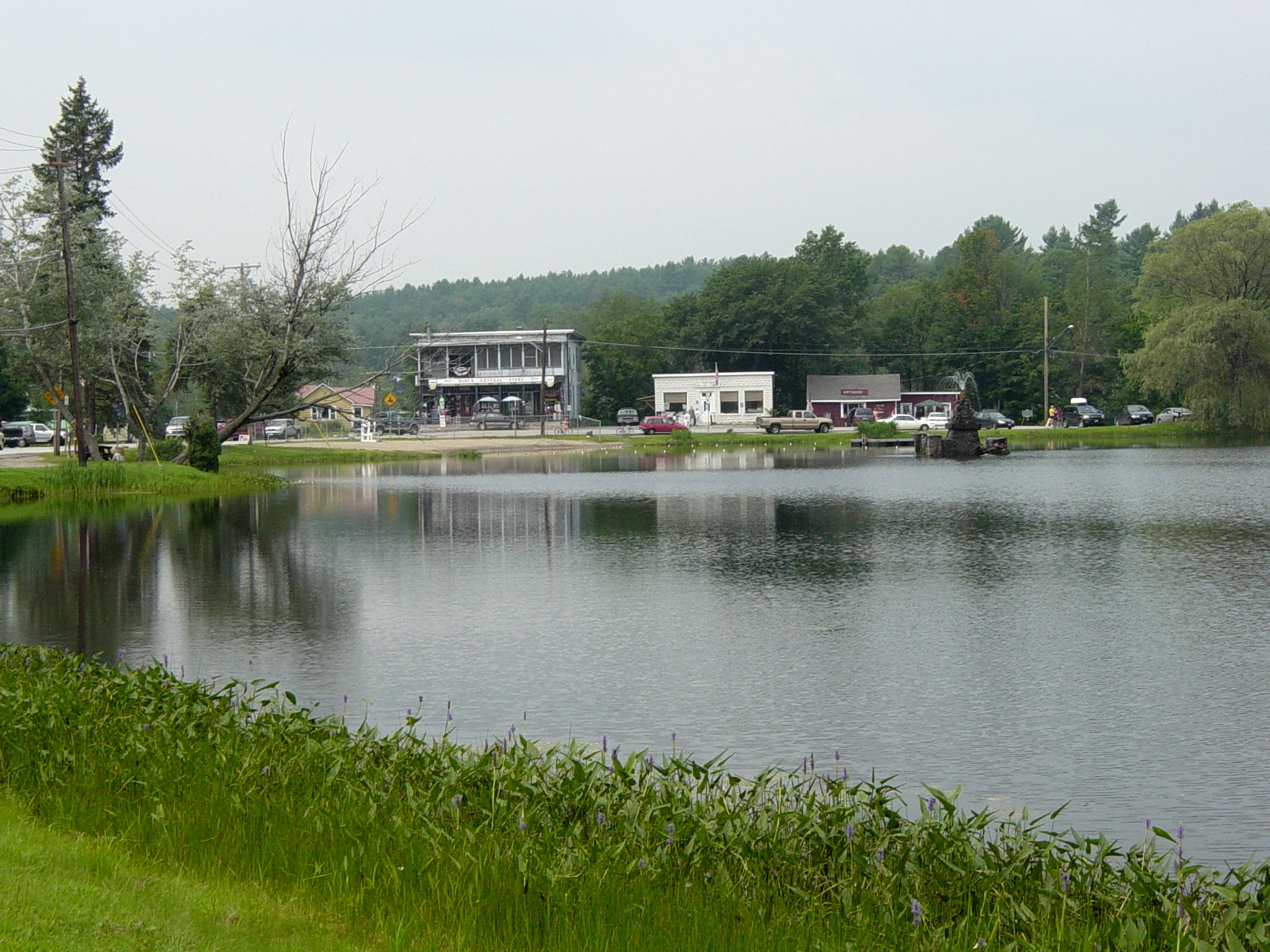
- Brant Lake in 2003

- Location within New York
- Coordinates: 43°40′35″N 73°44′58″W
- Country: United States
- State: New York
- County: Warren
- Town: Horicon
- Time zone: UTC-5 (EST)
  - Summer (DST): UTC-4 (DST)
- ZIP code: 12815
- Area code: 518
- Website: www.horiconny.gov

Brant Lake is a hamlet in the town of Horicon in Warren County, New York, United States. It is located approximately halfway between Albany to the south and Plattsburgh to the north.

== History ==
Since the mid-1880s, Brant Lake has been a popular fishing and hunting area among wealthy visitors, including Theodore Roosevelt. Circa 1900, several hotels began catering to these wealthy visitors. Summer camps for youth were established around the same time.

Brant Lake Camp was incorporated by R.B. Gerstenzang, J.E. Eberly, and John F. Malloy in 1917. The camp was featured in Town & Country magazine.

Brant Lake Lodge was one of oldest hotels in the area of the Adirondacks; it burned down in April 1925.

Brant Lake has had a post office and postmaster since at least 1892. The seat of government of the Town of Horicon is located in the hamlet.

Brant Lake is also notable for being the site of North America's first gerbil colony, which was established at Tumblebrook Farm in 1954 by Dr. V. Schwentker.

== Geography ==
The hamlet is just east of the Adirondack Northway, accessible via interchange 25. NY Route 8 traverses the hamlet. The hamlet is named for the eponymous lake which it surrounds. Brant Lake's ZIP code is 12815. The central part of the hamlet is located to the south of the lake, but ZIP Code 12815 extends to the northern end of the lake and ultimately to the border between Warren and Essex counties. Several summer camps and vacation homes, as well as homes of those who live in the hamlet year-round, line the perimeter of the lake, especially along the eastern and northern shores. The summer camps include Brant Lake Camp, Point O' Pines Camp, Pilgrim Camp, and the Curtis S. Read Scout Reservation.

== Gallery ==
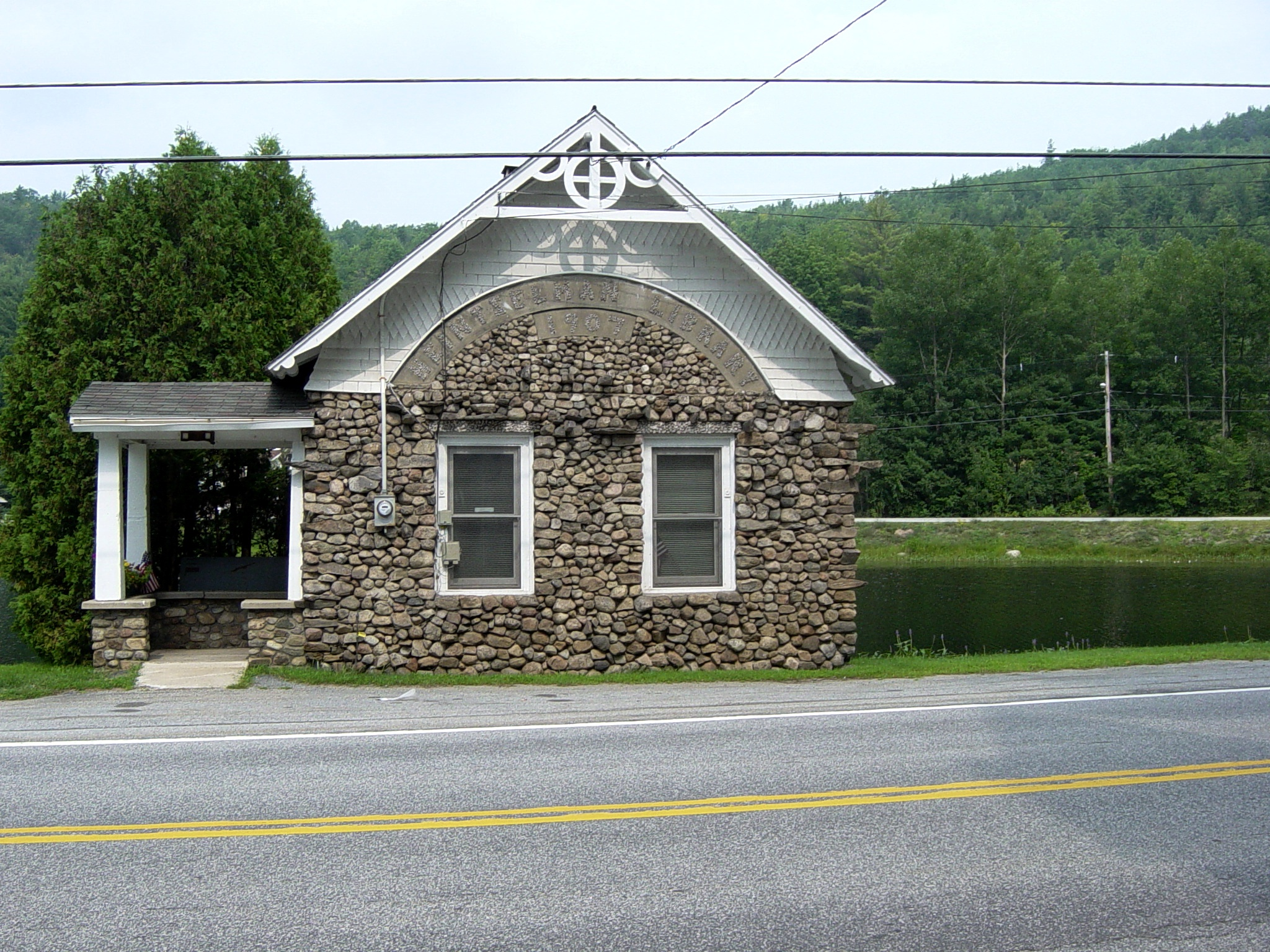
The Heintzelman Library, built 1907

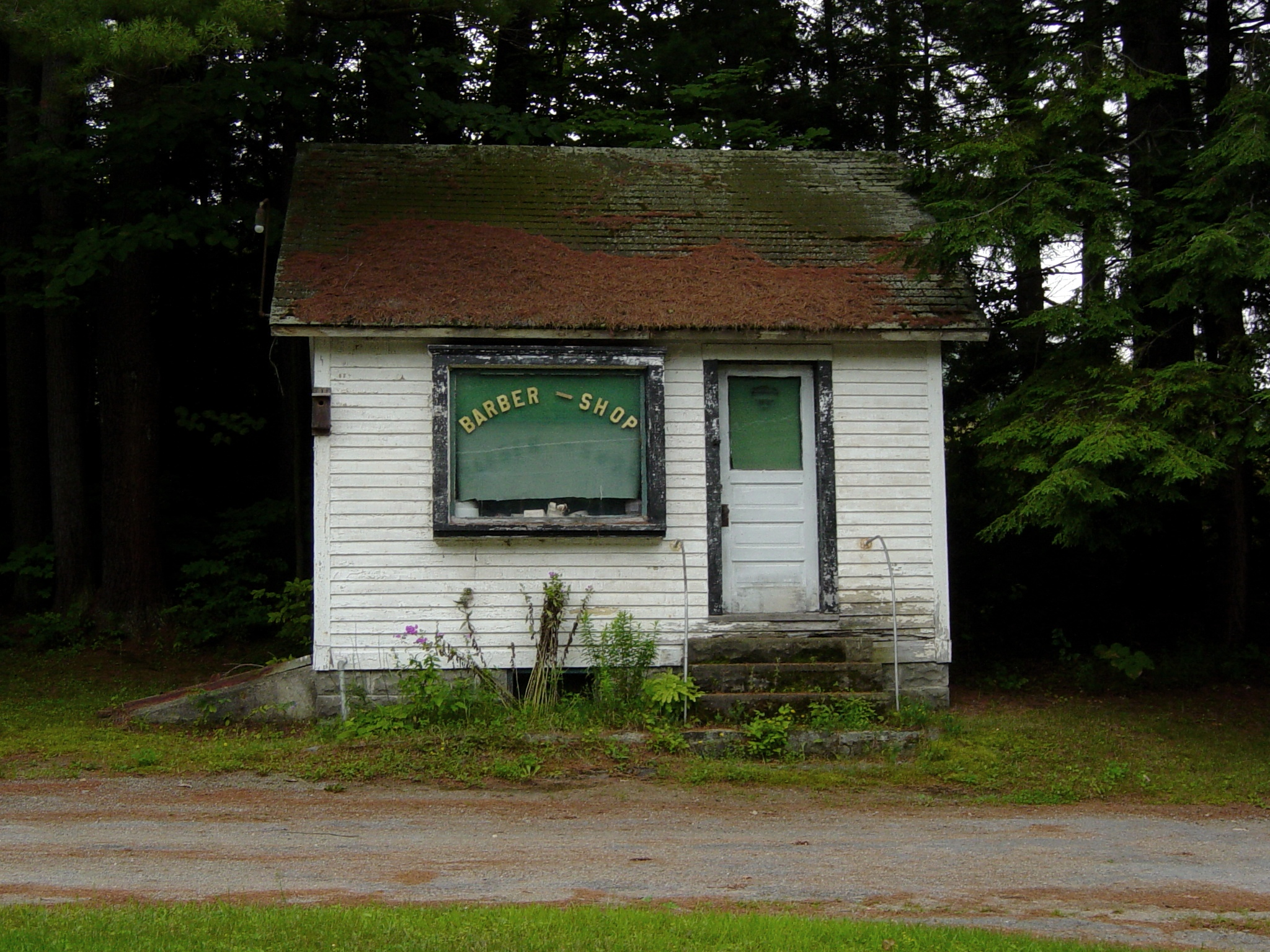
A former barbershop in Brant Lake NY

Tourists sitting at Brant Lake, New York 1909
