= Adirondack, New York =

Hamlet in the state of New York, United States

- Hamlet
- Location within New York Location within the United States
- Coordinates: 43°45′50″N 73°45′30″W
- Country: United States
- State: New York
- County: Warren
- Elevation: 814 ft (248 m)
- Time zone: UTC-5 (Eastern (EST))
  - Summer (DST): UTC-4 (EDT)
- ZIP code: 12808
- Area codes: 518 & 838
- GNIS feature ID: 942185

Adirondack is a hamlet in Warren County, New York, United States. The community is located on Schroon Lake near the northern border of the county, 32 miles (51 km) north of Glens Falls. Adirondack has a post office with ZIP code 12808.
