= Transportation in New York (state) =

Transportation in the State of New York

Overview
- Locale: The State of New York and surrounding regions
- Transit type: Rapid transit, commuter rail, buses, private automobile, ferry, Taxicab, bicycle, pedestrian

Transportation in New York is made up of some of the most extensive and one of the oldest transportation infrastructures in the country. Engineering difficulties because of the terrain of the State of New York and the unique issues of New York City brought on by urban crowding have had to be overcome since the state was young. Population expansion of the state generally followed the path of the early waterways, first the Hudson River and then the Erie Canal. Today, railroad lines and the New York State Thruway follow the same general route.

== History ==
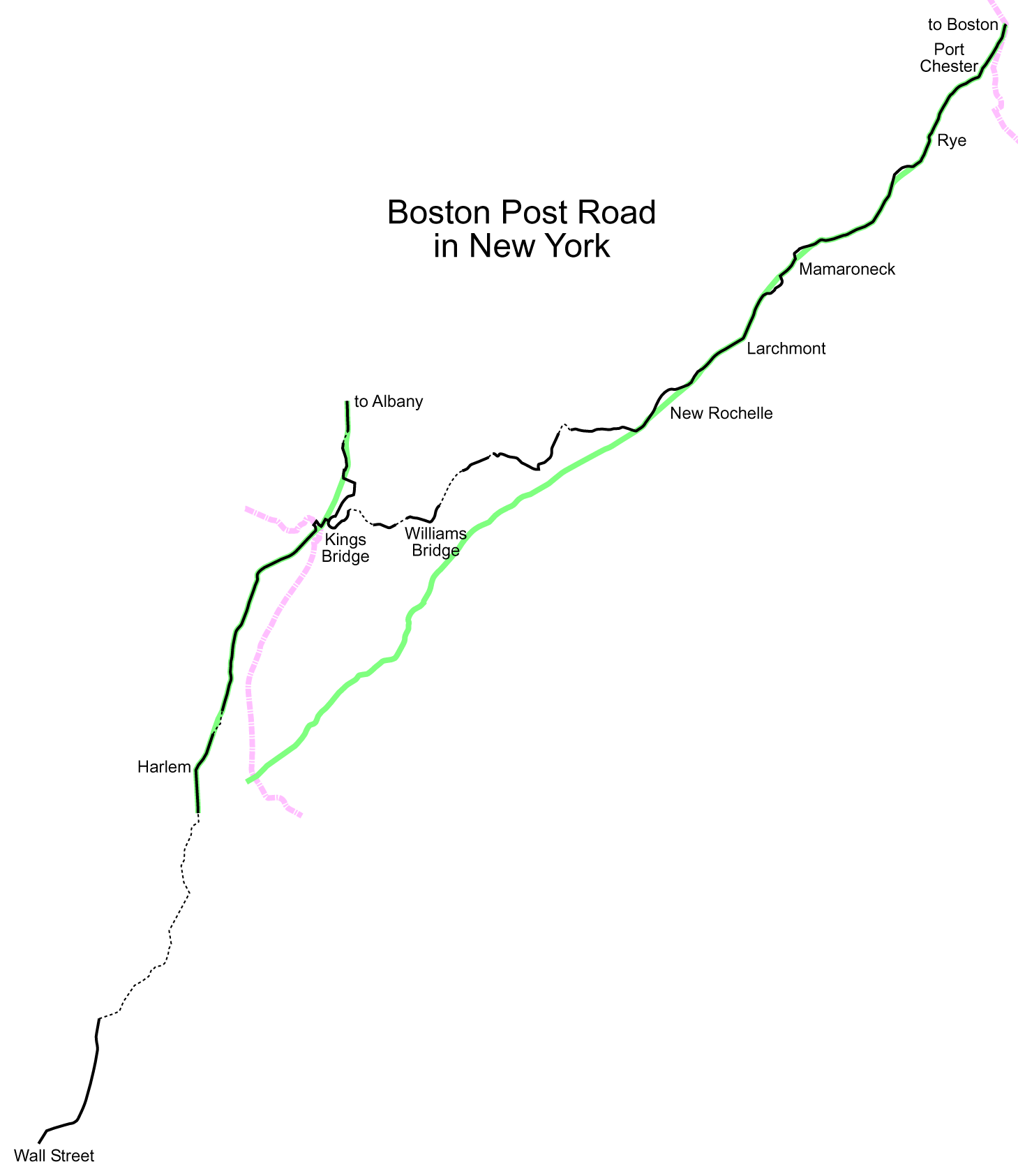
The Post Road in New York

Transportation was used early on to support industry and commerce in the State of New York. The Boston Post Road, between what then the relatively small City of New York and Boston, began as a path to deliver the post using post riders (the first ride to lay out the Upper Post Road starting January 22, 1673), and developed into a wagon, or stage road in later colonial times. During the 19th century, pieces of the road were taken over and improved by turnpike companies. In the 1910s and 1920s, the Lower Post Road alignment (and realignments made to the route) was a National Auto Trail known as the Boston Post Road. Large sections of the various routes are still given the name Boston Post Road, much of it is now U.S. Route 1.

By the American Revolutionary War, the colonial Province of New York was still small and relatively sparsely populated. In the 1790 United States Census, the state had a population of 340,120, placing it behind Virginia (747,610), Pennsylvania (434,373), Massachusetts (378,787). The state grew rapidly after this as New York City grew to become the country's shipping epicenter. On October 24, 1825, the Erie Canal opened and over the next century would make boom towns out of the Upstate cities of Buffalo, Rochester, Syracuse, Rome, Utica and Schenectady. Use of the canal would only decline after 1950. Cities in the State of New York would frequently show up as amongst the largest in the United States during the 19th, and into the early 20th century.

The other major contribution to New York's transportation system was its extensive railroad network. The New York Central Water Level Route was advertised as the world's first four-track railroad, and connected New York City, Buffalo, and the cities in between.

== Canals ==
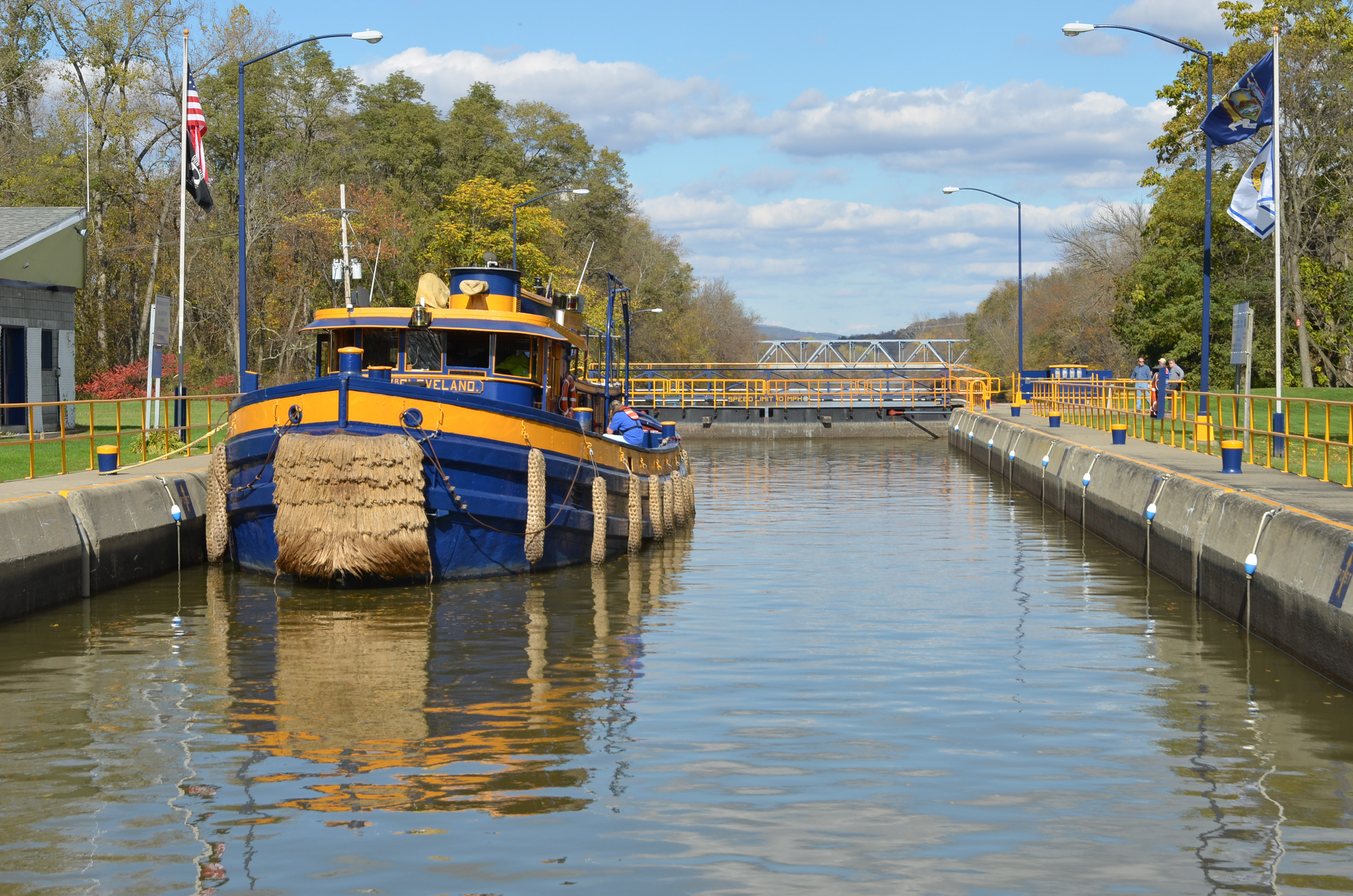
A tugboat at Champlain Canal Lock C9 in Kingsbury, New York

Early transportation in the State of New York was primarily by rivers and canals. Today, the canals are primarily used for recreation.

- Erie Canal
- New York Barge Canal

== Mass transit ==
One of the most famous urban mass transit systems in the world is the New York City Subway. New York City is also served by Port Authority Trans-Hudson (PATH), the Staten Island Railway and an extensive bus system.

Besides New York City, many of the other cities have mass transit systems.

Buffalo Metro Rail serves Buffalo, the second largest city in the state. However, this service also resembles a light rail system.

=== Defunct ===
Rochester had a subway system, although it is mostly destroyed. Only a small part exists under the old Erie Canal Aqueduct. In its day, the system would carry people underground on what were essentially streetcars. If the system still existed today, it would probably be described as a light rail service.

Rochester, Utica, and other upstate cities once had streetcar and interurban systems.

=== Bus service in New York state ===
==== Transit and commuter buses ====
In 2025, the Federal Transit Administration (FTA) tallied 949,239,604 unlinked passenger trips taken on various bus systems based in New York State (this figure does not include interstate bus lines of NJ Transit). These include recipients of federal aid under the FTA's Urbanized (49 U.S.C. § 5307) and Rural (49 U.S.C. § 5311 ) Formula grant funding. They include a mixture of transit bus, bus rapid transit, and intercity bus service. New York's largest providers of bus service are dedicated transit districts or authorities (such as Metropolitan Transportation Authority in New York City and Capital District Transportation Authority in the Albany and its suburbs) whose staff are employed as civil servants. Several New York's counties and municipalities (including Westchester County and Nassau County) provide bus service by contracting to private companies.

===== FTA Urbanized Area Formula grant recipients =====
2025 bus ridership and operating fleet sizes of FTA urbanized area formula grant recipients New York State
Agency	Unlinked Passenger Trips (UPT)	Vehicles Operated in Maximum Service (VOMS)	Notes
MTA New York City Transit and MTA Bus Company	836,350,669	5,034	Both New York City Transit and MTA Bus are subsidiaries of the Metropolitan Transportation Authority. They report separately to the Federal Transit Administration; they are combined here.
Westchester County - Bee Line	25,255,845	270	
Nassau Inter County Express	20,423,754	235	
Capital District Transportation Authority	18,083,544	236	
Niagara Frontier Transportation Authority	13,585,284	202	
Regional Transit Service	10,860,539	157	
Central New York Regional Transportation Authority	7,315,455	136	
Suffolk County Transit	3,562,146	120	
Tompkins Consolidated Area Transit	2,874,228	29	
Transport of Rockland	1,912,163	36	
BC Transit	1,582,629	38	
Kiryas Joel Transit	1,392,957	16	
Dutchess County Public Transit	830,843	34	
Hampton Jitney	549,452	59	
Ulster County Area Transit	518,028	28	
Adirondack Trailways	361,753	12	
C TRAN	304,996	19	
Newburgh Beacon Bus Corporation	278,170	7	
Hudson Rail Link	237,510	9	Hudson Rail Link is the brand name for feeder bus service for Metro-North Railroad.
Private Transportation Corporation	184,723	6	Private Transportation Corporation is the operator of the private B110 bus route between the Hasidic enclaves of Borough Park and Williamsburg, Brooklyn.
Long Beach Bus	102,439	5	
Putnam Area Rapid Transit	83,649	7	
CitiBus	85,826	6	
New York City Economic Development Corporation	79,464	3	The New York City Economic Development Corporation operates shuttle bus service as part of its NYC Ferry operations.
Transit Orange	70,081	3	
Mini Trans	60,770	8	
Huntington Area Rapid Transit	42,512	8	
Kaser Bus Service	26,514	2	
Seneca Nation of Indians	25,163	3	
Leprechaun Lines	19,403	8	Leprechaun Lines operates service using both the Newburgh Area Transit brand and its own livery.
Town of Warwick	12,235	1	
Town of Wallkill	8,318	1	
Town of Monroe	6,528	1	

==== FTA Rural Area Formula grant recipients ====
2025 bus ridership and operating fleet sizes of FTA rural area formula grant recipients New York State
Agency	Unlinked Passenger Trips (UPT)	Vehicles Operated in Maximum Service (VOMS)
Regional Transit Service	501,308	98
Oneonta Public Transit	410,779	13
St. Lawrence County Public Transit	174,891	40
Move Sullivan	141,946	9
Clinton County Public Transit	115,613	8
Access Allegany	103,424	5
CHQ Transit	100,285	20
Corning Erwin Area Transit System	98,479	5
Essex County Public Transportation	90,044	13
Steuben County Transportation System	47,317	2
Gloversville Transit System	46,475	4
Columbia County Public Transportation	42,328	5
Schoharie County Public Transportation	41,949	12
Oswego Public Transportation	39,316	6
Lewis County Public Transportation	33,966	9
Franklin County Public Transportation	28,413	8
Yates Transit Service	25,345	5
Otsego Express	24,534	11
Schuyler County	22,839	5
Hornell Area Transit	20,115	4
Greene County Transit	15,820	6
Madison Transit System	15,801	7
Connect Niagara	8,688	4
County of Rensselaer	2,339	1

==== Interstate and intercity buses ====
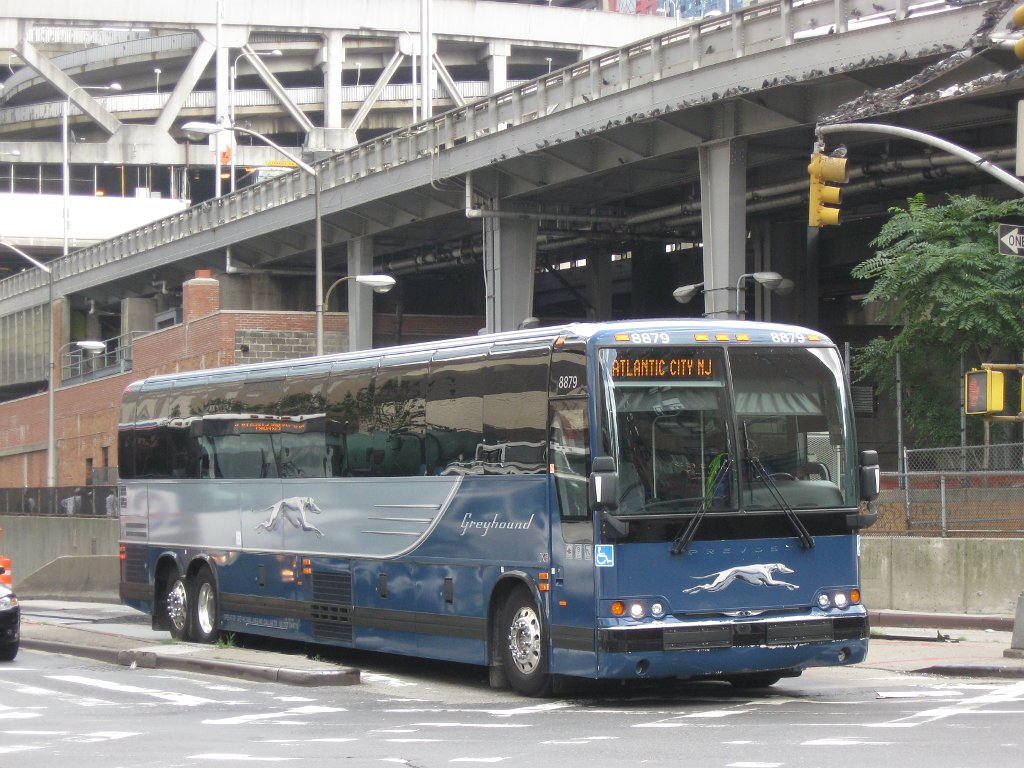
A Prevost X3-45 operated by Greyhound in New York City, August 2009

New York City is a hub for intercity bus networks in the northeastern United States. The rest of the state is served by intercity buses run by companies such as Megabus, Greyhound Lines, Trailways of New York, OurBus, North Fork Express, Hampton Jitney, Coach USA Short Line and others.

== Rail ==
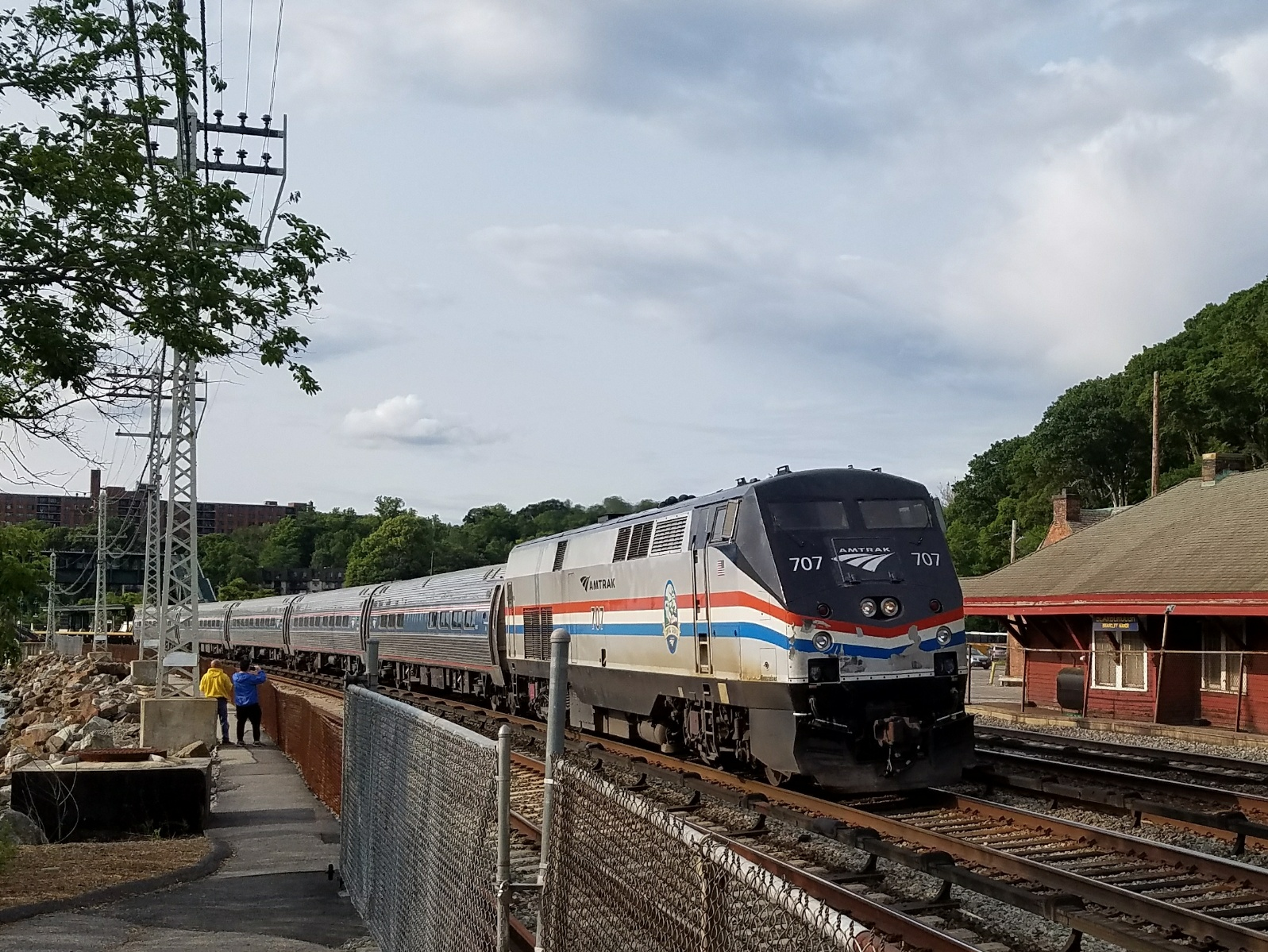
An Empire Service train passing through Briarcliff Manor, New York in June 2023.

=== Commuter railroads ===
- Long Island Rail Road
- Metro-North Railroad

NJ Transit and Amtrak also serve New York City and its suburbs.

=== Interstate rail service ===
Like most of United States, the only intercity rail passenger service is provided by Amtrak. New York City's Pennsylvania Station is the busiest of Amtrak's rail stations. The most successful of Amtrak's routes, the Northeast Corridor, operates between Washington, D.C., and Boston, Massachusetts. The most popular and heavily used routes in the Amtrak system are those on the Northeast Corridor, which include the Acela Express, and the Northeast Regional.

Amtrak's Empire Service trains provide frequent daily service along the 460-mile (740 km) Empire Corridor between New York City and Niagara Falls. The route was formerly the Water Level Route of the New York Central Railroad to Buffalo and then the former Buffalo and Niagara Falls Railroad. One train, known as the Maple Leaf, continues beyond Niagara Falls to Toronto, Ontario, Canada.

== Aviation ==
In the state of New York, the most prominent airports are the ones serving New York City, with John F. Kennedy International Airport and LaGuardia Airport having the most enplanements by a wide margin. Buffalo Niagara International Airport, the airport with the third most enplanements lags behind second place LaGuardia by 13 million.

=== New York City airports ===
==== LaGuardia Airport ====
LaGuardia Airport, colloquially known as LaGuardia or simply LGA – is a civil airport in East Elmhurst, Queens, New York City, situated on the northwestern shore of Long Island, bordering Flushing Bay. Covering 680 acres (280 ha) as of January 1, 2025, the facility was established in 1929 and began operating as a public airport in 1939. It is named after Fiorello H. La Guardia, a former mayor of New York City.

== Automobile transportation ==
=== New York Thruway ===
New York State Thruway

The largest single artery in the State of New York is the New York State Thruway, which is more than 400 miles from The Bronx to Buffalo. It follows the Hudson River between New York City and Albany with an Interstate 87 designation and the Erie Canal between Albany and the Pennsylvania border with an Interstate 90 designation.

=== Parkways ===
New York is home to many parkways built by Robert Moses. Among his projects are the Brooklyn-Queens Expressway, the Staten Island Expressway, the Cross-Bronx Expressway, the Belt Parkway, the Laurelton Parkway, and many more.

Other parkways include the Cross County Parkway and Saw Mill River Parkway in Westchester, the Taconic State Parkway, the Palisades Interstate Parkway, the Northern State Parkway and the Southern State Parkway (the latter two both in Long Island).

=== Bridges ===
Many of the list of bridges can be found from List of rivers of New York.

==== Allegheny River ====
- Quaker Bridge

==== Arthur Kill ====
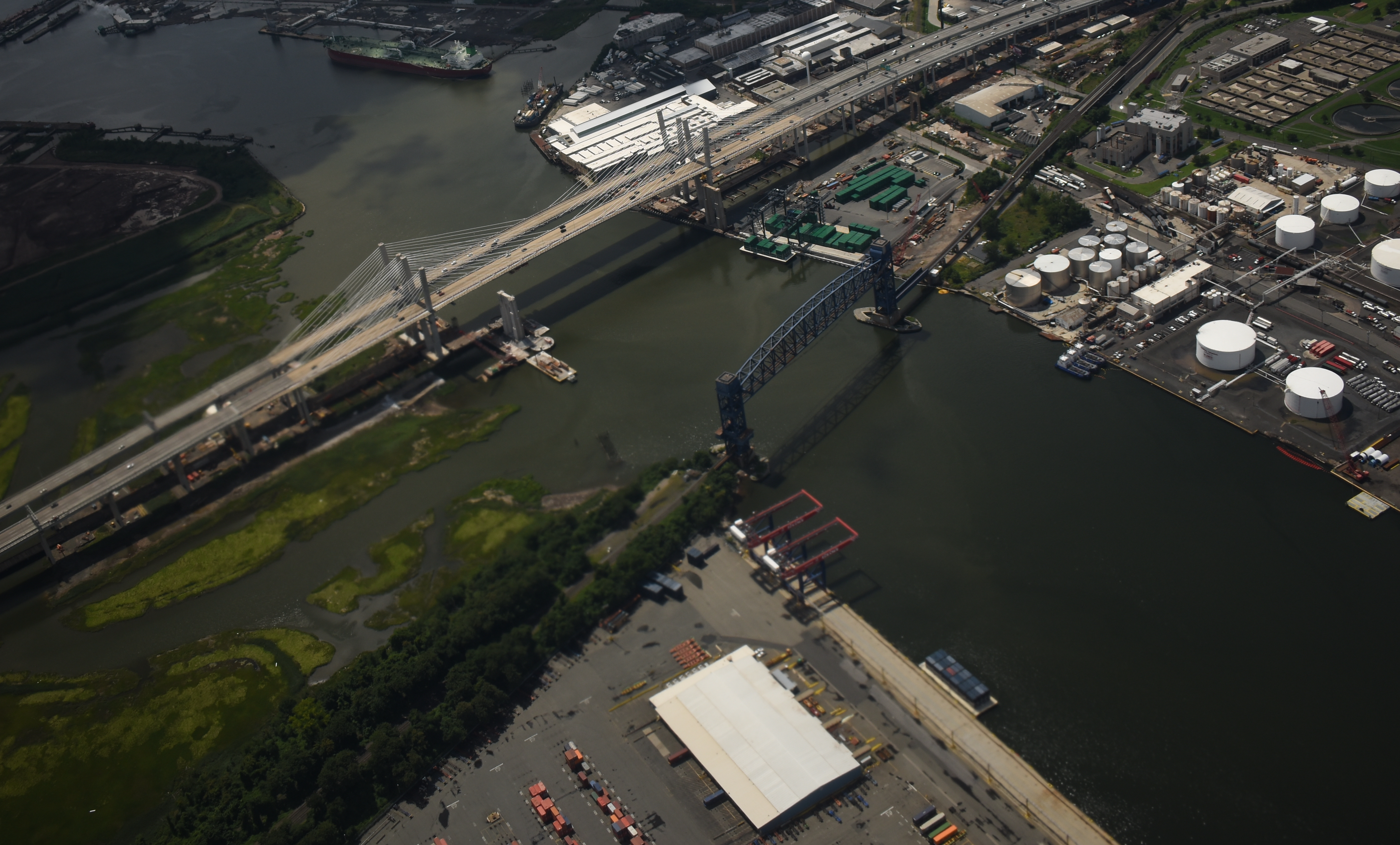
New Goethals Bridge from airplane between Staten Island and New Jersey

- Goethals Bridge
- Outerbridge Crossing

==== Delaware River ====
- Barryville–Shohola Bridge
- Callicoon Bridge
- Cochecton–Damascus Bridge
- Kellams Bridge
- Lordville–Equinunk Bridge
- Mid-Delaware Bridge
- Narrowsburg–Darbytown Bridge
- Pond Eddy Bridge
- Roebling's Delaware Aqueduct
- Skinners Falls–Milanville Bridge

==== East River ====
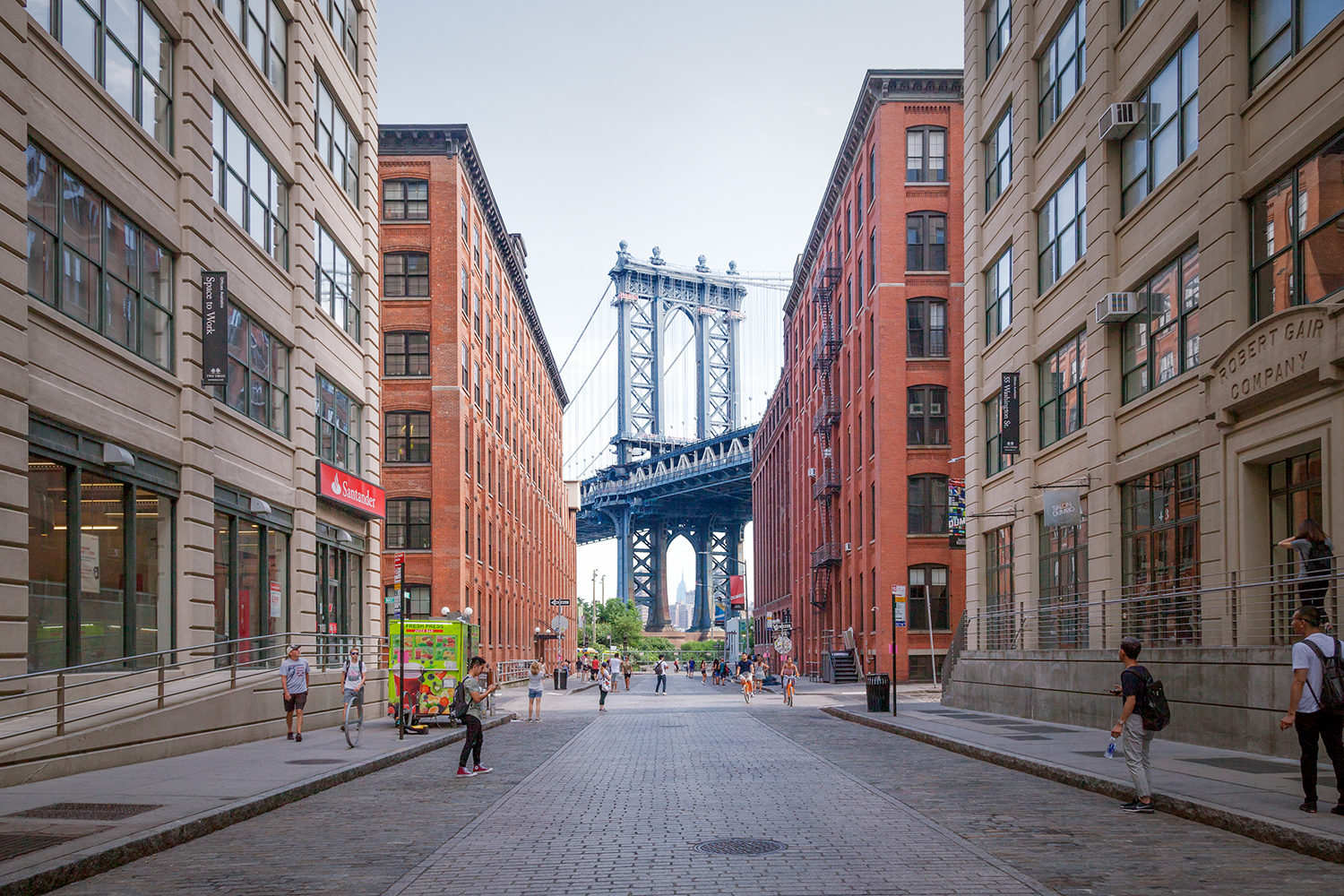
View of Manhattan Bridge from Washington Street in DUMBO, Brooklyn

- Brooklyn Bridge
- Manhattan Bridge
- Williamsburg Bridge
- Ed Koch Queensboro Bridge
- Bronx–Whitestone Bridge
- Throgs Neck Bridge
- Tappan Zee Bridge

==== Harlem River ====
- Alexander Hamilton Bridge
- Broadway Bridge
- Henry Hudson Bridge
- 145th Street Bridge
- Third Avenue Bridge
- Triborough Bridge
- University Heights Bridge
- Washington Bridge
- Willis Avenue Bridge

==== Hudson River ====
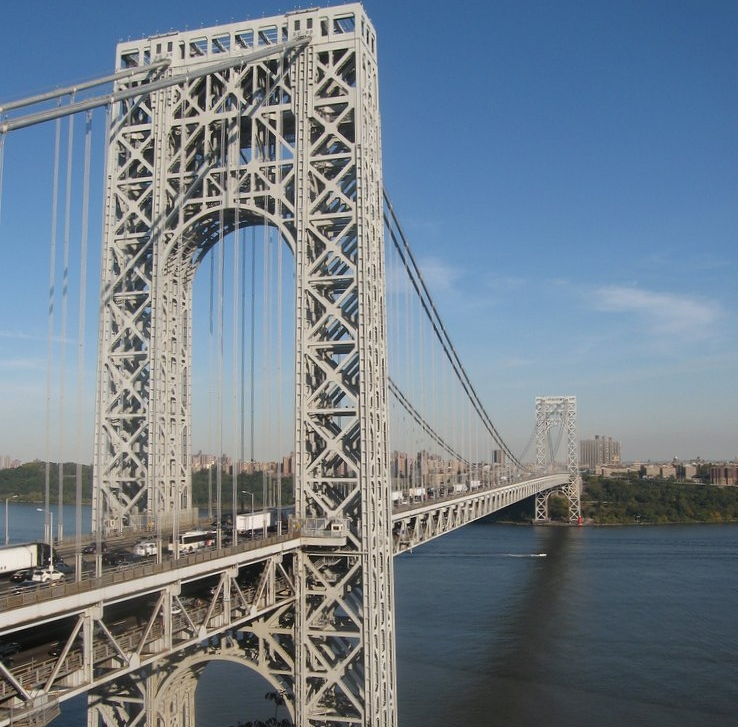
The George Washington Bridge as seen towards New York City in October 2008

- Bear Mountain Bridge
- Castleton Bridge
- Collar City Bridge
- Congress Street Bridge
- Dunn Memorial Bridge
- The Glen Bridge
- George Washington Bridge, spanning the Hudson River between New York City and Fort Lee, New Jersey, the world's busiest motor vehicle bridge.
- Green Island Bridge
- Kingston–Rhinecliff Bridge
- Mechanicville Bridge
- Menands Bridge
- Mid-Hudson Bridge
- Newburgh–Beacon Bridge
- North Creek Bridge
- 112th Street Bridge
- Patroon Island Bridge
- Rip Van Winkle Bridge
- Riparius Bridge
- Schuylerville Bridge
- Stillwater Bridge
- Thurman Station Bridge
- Troy–Waterford Bridge

==== Kill Van Kull ====
- Bayonne Bridge

==== Lake Champlain ====
- Lake Champlain Bridge

==== The Narrows ====
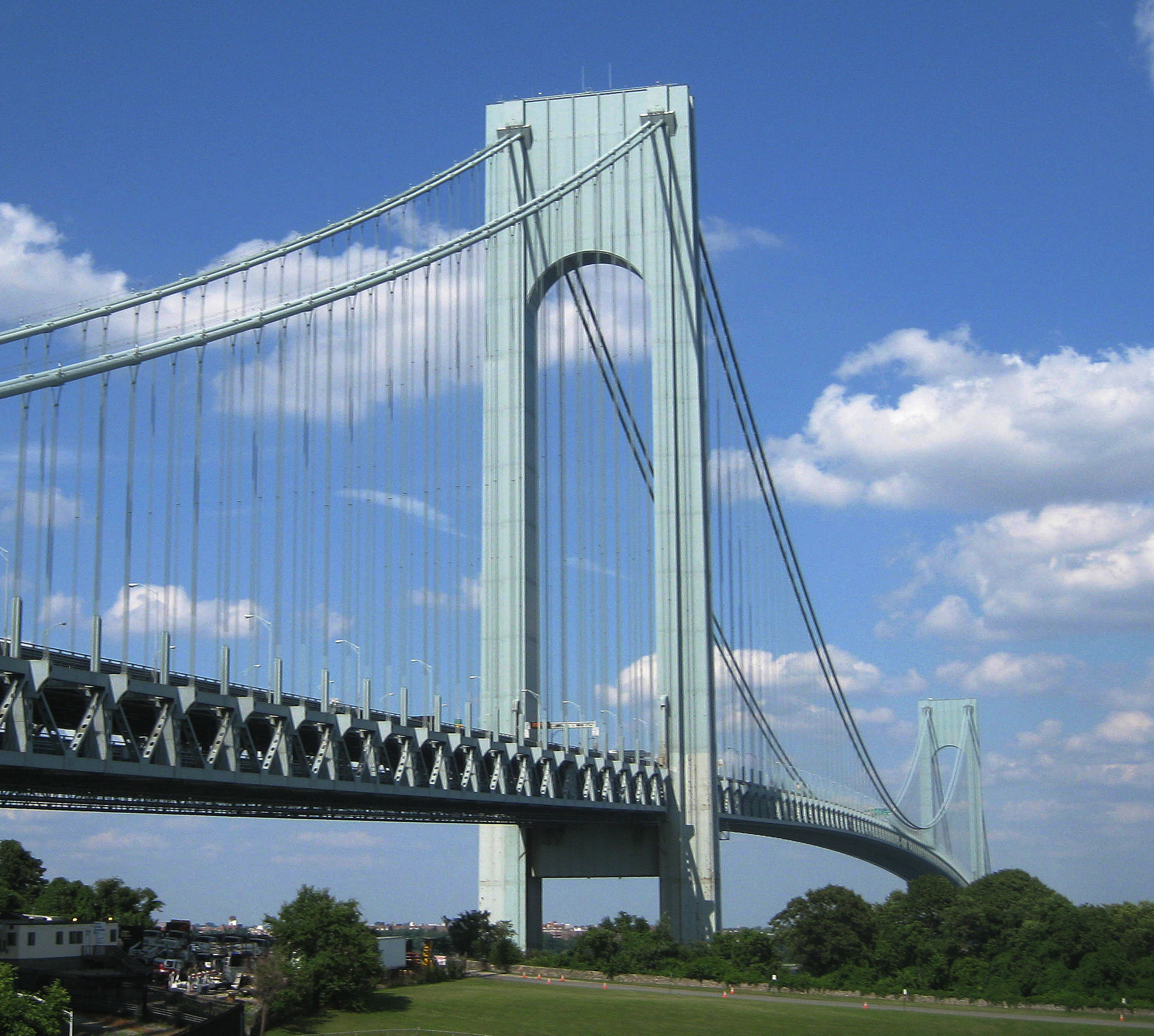
The Verrazzano–Narrows Bridge carries Interstate 278 between Staten Island and Brooklyn across the Narrows

- Verrazzano–Narrows Bridge

==== Newtown Creek ====
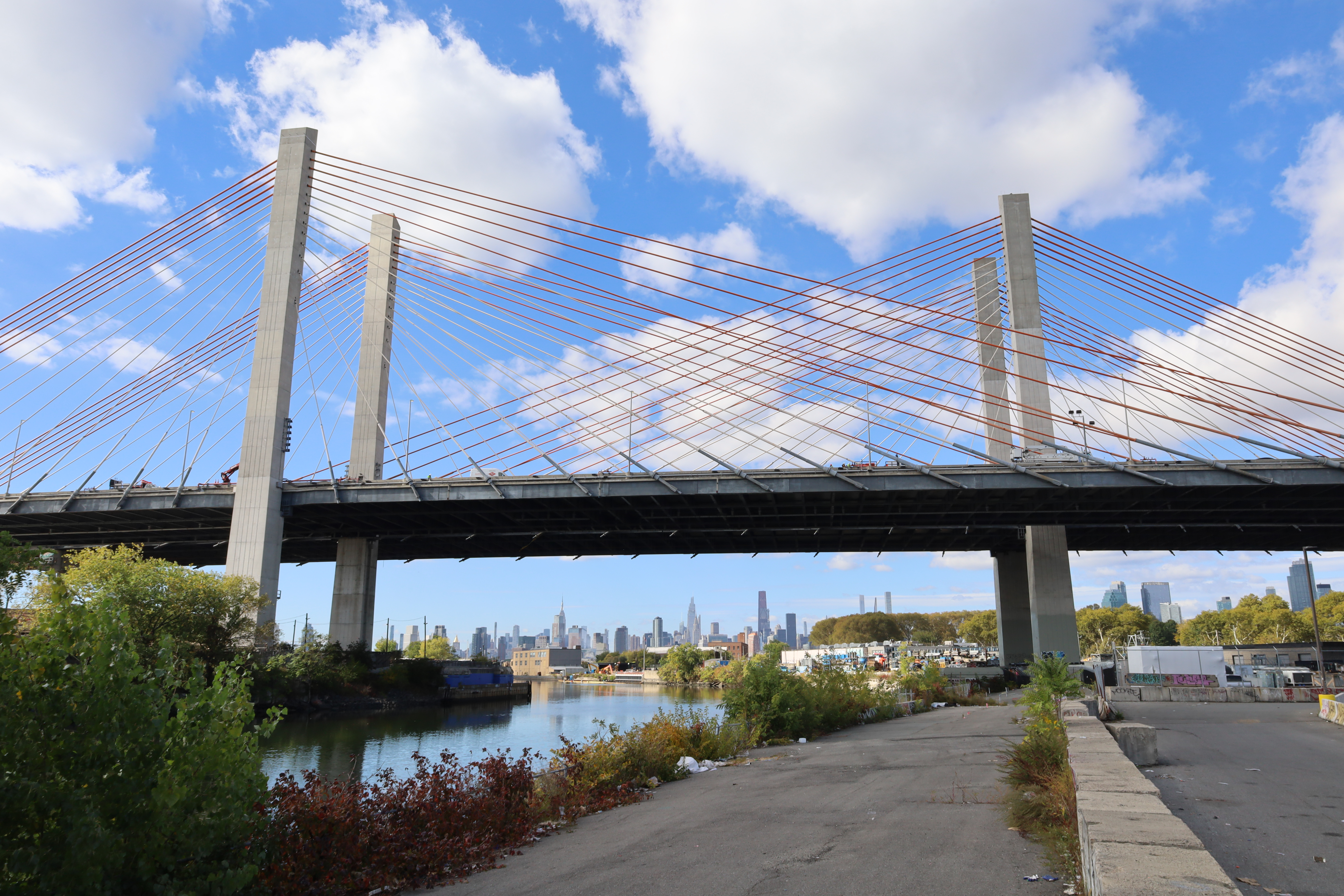
The Kosciuszko Bridge carries Interstate 278 (BQE) between Queens and Brooklyn across Newtown Creek

- Greenpoint Avenue Bridge
- Kosciuszko Bridge
- Pulaski Bridge

==== Niagara River ====
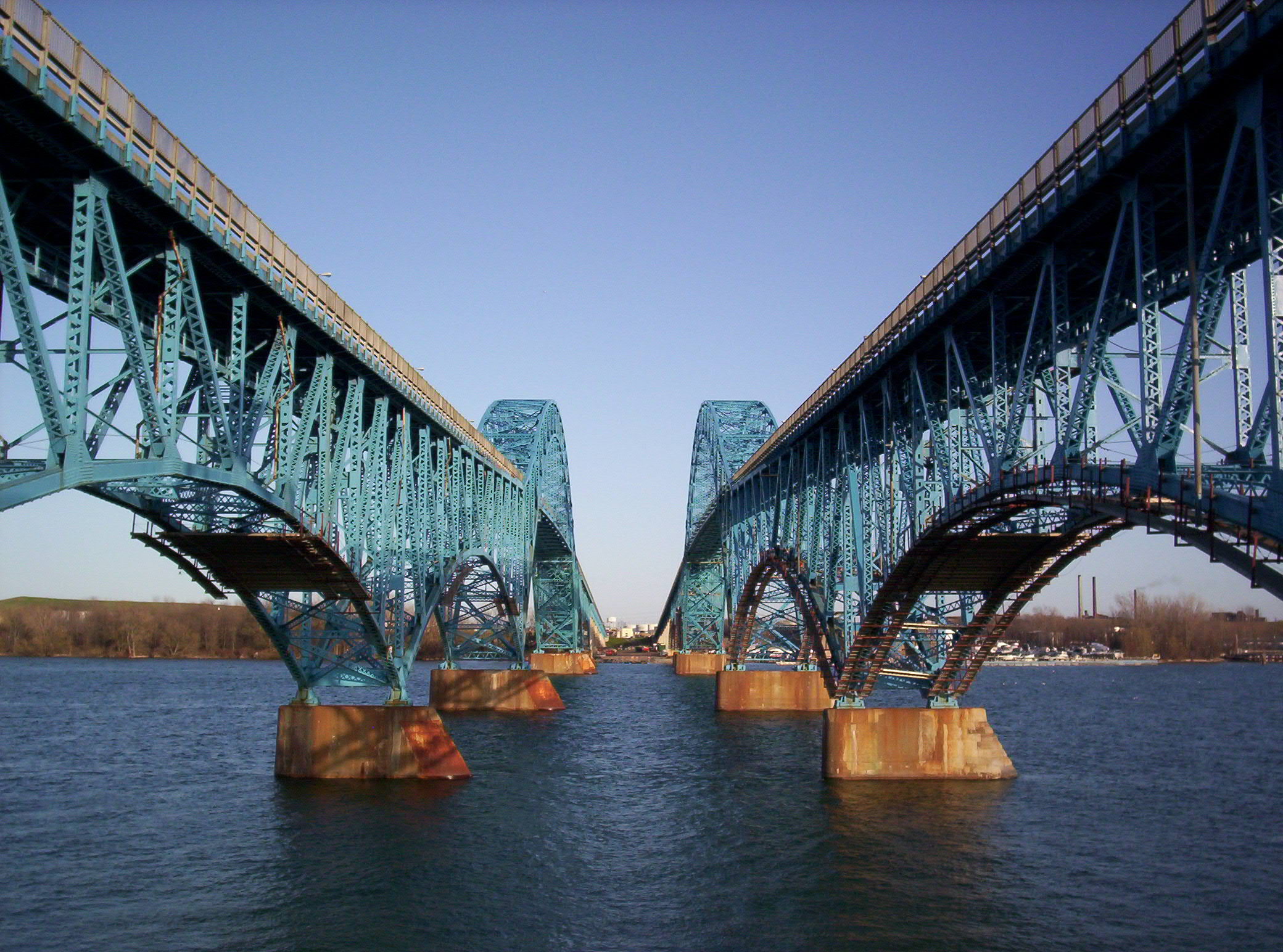
Beteen the South Grand Island Bridge

- Lewiston–Queenston Bridge
- North Grand Island Bridge
- Peace Bridge
- Rainbow Bridge
- South Grand Island Bridge

==== Susquehanna River ====
- South Washington Street Parabolic Bridge

=== Tunnels ===
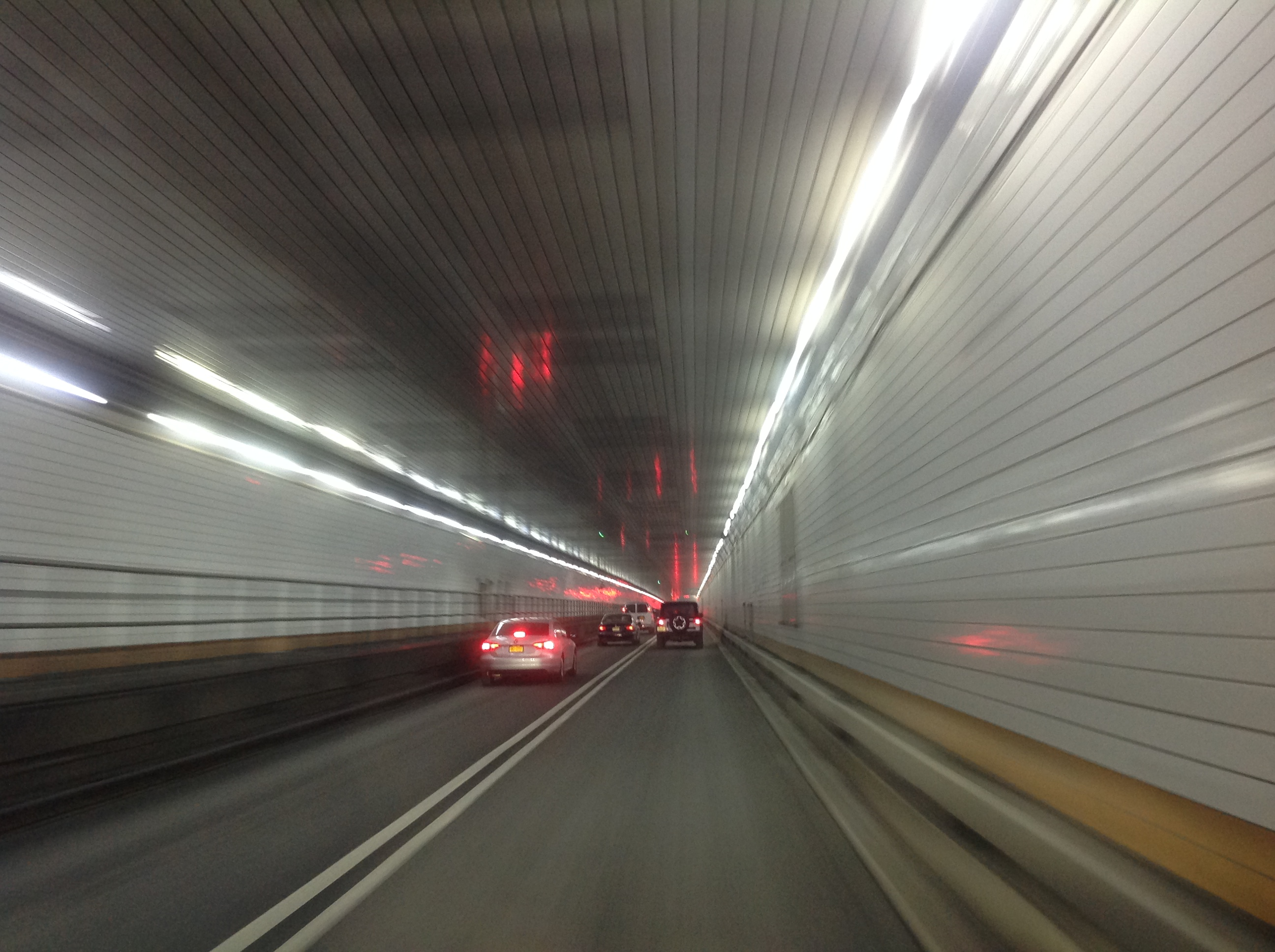
Eastbound in the Holland Tunnel in December 2019

Most tunnels in the state of New York are within New York City.

- Holland Tunnel - a partially tolled tunnel that connects Lower Manhattan to Jersey City across the Hudson River
- Lincoln Tunnel - a partially tolled tunnel that connects Midtown Manhattan to Weehawken, NJ across the Hudson River
- Queens–Midtown Tunnel - a tolled tunnel that connects Midtown Manhattan ro Queens across the East River
- Brooklyn–Battery Tunnel - a tolled tunnel that connects Battery Park to Brooklyn
- Park Avenue Tunnel - a one-way tunnel underneath a portion Park Avenue in Midtown Manhattan

=== Interstates ===
==== North-South Interstates ====
The principal north–south highways are as follows:

Interstate 81 has two auxiliary routes, Interstate 481 and Interstate 781.

Interstate 87 has three auxiliary routes: Interstate 287, Interstate 587, and Interstate 787.

Interstate 95 has three auxiliary routes: Interstate 295, Interstate 495, and Interstate 695.

==== East-West Interstates ====
The principal east–west highways are as follows:

- (the part of the Holland Tunnel that is in New York State, originally planned as the Lower Manhattan Expressway)

Interstate 78 has four auxiliary routes: Interstate 278, Interstate 478, Interstate 678, and Interstate 878. All were planned to connect to Interstate 78, but none of them currently do.

Interstate 84 has one auxiliary route, Interstate 684.

Interstate 86 and Interstate 88 have no auxiliary routes.

Interstate 90 has nine auxiliary routes: Interstate 190, Interstate 290, Interstate 390, Interstate 490, Interstate 590, Interstate 690, Interstate 790, Interstate 890, and Interstate 990.

=== Safety ===
Between 2010 and 2014, NYS has between 1039 and 1202 yearly road traffic fatalities, that is between 8 and 8.3 fatalities by billion miles traveled. Pedestrian fatalities are between yearly 263 and 336.

In the NY state, pedestrians are one out of 4 fatalities, each year. Those fatalities are due to unsafe actions both from motorists and from pedestrians.

NY state is one of the fives US states with the most pedestrian fatalities: 879 fatalities of which 294 (33%) occurred at intersections.

== Bicycle ==
New York has a system of numbered state bicycle routes.

== Transportation in New York City ==
New York City boasts one of the most extensive urban transportation systems in the world, including two distinct mass transit systems:

- New York City Subway - by some measures, the most extensive rapid transit system in the world
  - Staten Island Railway - not technically part of the Subway, but serves a similar purpose on the Borough of Staten Island; isolated from the national rail network and the New York City Subway
- Port Authority Trans-Hudson - rapid transit between Manhattan and New Jersey

New York City's automobile network is also extensive. It includes many bridges and limited access highways built by Robert Moses, and is integrated with a street grid that dates to the early 19th century.

While extensive, much of New York City's infrastructure is aging and in need of capital investment. Despite the lack of expansion and investment during the past few decades, many infrastructure projects including the Second Avenue Subway, 7 Subway Extension, Fulton Center, and the East Side Access have already started construction during the 2000s.

== Transportation on Long Island ==
Every major form of transportation serves Long Island, including three major airports, railroads and subways, and several major highways. There are historic and modern bridges, recreational and commuter trails, and ferries as well.

The Long Island Expressway, Northern State Parkway, and Southern State Parkway, all products of the automobile-centered planning of Robert Moses, make east–west travel on the island straightforward, if not always quick. Indeed, locals refer to Long Island Expressway as "The World's Longest Parking Lot".

There are currently ten road crossings out of Long Island, all within New York City limits at the extreme western end of the island. Plans for a Long Island Sound link at various locations in Nassau and Suffolk Counties have been discussed for decades, but there are currently no firm plans to construct such a crossing.

The Long Island Rail Road is the busiest commuter railroad system in North America, carrying an average of 282,400 customers each weekday on 728 daily trains. Chartered on April 24, 1834, it is also the oldest railroad still operating under its original name.

== Transportation in Buffalo ==
Transportation in Buffalo is dominated by automobile use, but other modes of transportation exist in the city.

The Erie Canal made Buffalo a major port. Railroads including the New York Central confirmed its status.

== Proposals ==
=== Commuter rail ===
See:

- New York high-speed rail

=== Mass transit ===
- The Second Avenue Subway is under construction in New York City.

=== Proposed light rail systems ===
New York presently only boasts the Buffalo Metro Rail, which is arguably a light rail system. Proposals include:

- Capital district light rail (with former State Senate Majority Leader Joseph Bruno voicing support)
- 42nd Street Light Rail
- Staten Island light rail proposals
- Rochester is entertaining the idea of getting light rail service. The city has been discussing what to do with the right of way used by its former subway system. The city wants to use the right of way, which used to be the route of the Erie Canal, for light rail, recreate the canal, or fill the trench.

== See also ==
- New York State Department of Transportation
- New York State Department of Motor Vehicles
- New York City Department of Transportation
- Plug-in electric vehicles in New York (state)
