= North Creek =

North Creek may refer to:

- North Creek (Toronto), formerly a small creek, now buried, in Toronto, Ontario
- North Creek (Lake Erie), a tributary that joins Big Creek (Lake Erie), at Delhi, Ontario
- North Creek, New York, a hamlet in Johnsburg, Warren County, New York, United States
  - North Creek Railroad Station Complex, a historic railroad station complex at North Creek, Warren County, New York
- North Creek (West Canada Creek tributary), in Herkimer County, New York
- North Creek, Ohio, an unincorporated community
- North Creek (South Dakota), a stream in South Dakota
- North Creek (conservation area), a wildland in western Virginia
- North Creek, Wisconsin, an unincorporated community in Arcadia, Trempealeau County, Wisconsin, United States
- North Creek (Southern California), a river of California

== See also ==
- North Creek Woods, woods in the Cook County Forest Preserves in Lansing, Illinois
- North Creek Bridge, a bridge over the Hudson River between Johnsburg and Chester, New York State
- North Creek Forest, a forest in Bothell, Washington
- North Creek School, a school building in Bothell, Washington
- North Creek, Washington, a community in Bothell, Washington
