= Transportation in New York =

Transportation in New York may refer to:

- Transportation in New York (state)
- Transportation in New York City
