= List of crossings of the Hudson River =

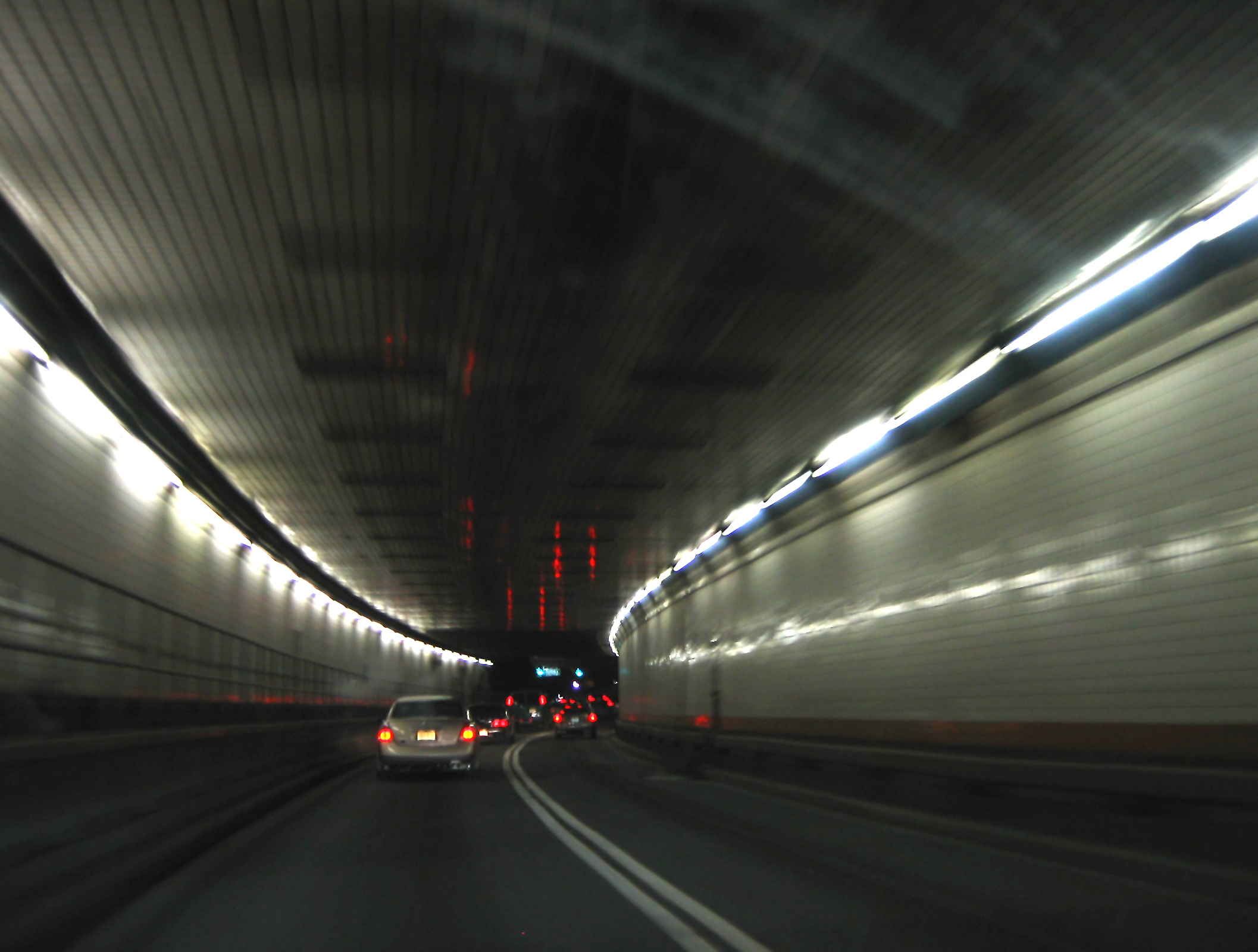
The Holland Tunnel is one of America's busiest tunnels.

This is a list of bridges and other crossings of the Hudson River, from its mouth at the Upper New York Bay upstream to its cartographic beginning at Henderson Lake in Newcomb, New York.

== Crossings ==
The crossings are listed from south to north.

Crossing	Carries	Location	Built	Coordinates	Image	Tolls
New Jersey – New York
Downtown Hudson Tubes	Port Authority Trans-Hudson	Jersey City – Manhattan	1909			
Holland Tunnel	I-78 / Route 139	Jersey City – Manhattan	1927	40°43′39″N 74°01′16″W		$17.00 (eastbound)
Uptown Hudson Tubes	Port Authority Trans-Hudson	Jersey City – Manhattan	1908			
North River Tunnels	Amtrak and NJ Transit	North Bergen – Manhattan	1910	40°45′32″N 74°00′46″W		
Lincoln Tunnel	Route 495 / NY 495	Weehawken – Manhattan	1937 (Center Tube); 1945 (North Tube); 1957 (South Tube)	40°45′47″N 74°00′36″W		$17.00 (eastbound)
George Washington Bridge	I-95 / US 1-9 / US 46 / BR 9	Fort Lee – Manhattan	1931 (Upper Level); 1962 (Lower Level)	40°51′05″N 73°57′09″W		$17.63 (eastbound)
New York
Tappan Zee Bridge	I-87 / I-287 / New York Thruway	South Nyack – Tarrytown	1955-2017 (demolished)	41°04′12″N 73°53′40″W		
New Tappan Zee Bridge	I-87 / I-287 / New York Thruway	South Nyack – Tarrytown	2017 (westbound) 2018 (eastbound)	41°04′17″N 73°53′40″W		$7.48 (eastbound)
Bear Mountain Bridge	US 6 / US 202 / Appalachian Trail / BR 9	Highlands – Cortlandt	1924	41°19′11″N 73°59′00″W		$1.50 (eastbound)
Newburgh–Beacon Bridge	I-84 / NY 52	Newburgh – Beacon	1963 (westbound); 1980	41°31′11″N 73°59′50″W		$1.50 (eastbound)
Mid-Hudson Bridge	US 44 / NY 55	Lloyd – Poughkeepsie	1930	41°42′10″N 73°56′45″W		$1.50 (eastbound)
Poughkeepsie Railroad Bridge	Former railroad bridge, now pedestrian/bicycle	Highland – Poughkeepsie	1889 (rail); 2009 (pedestrian)	41°42′37″N 73°56′22″W		
Kingston–Rhinecliff Bridge	NY 199	Ulster – Rhinebeck	1957	41°58′38″N 73°56′43″W		$1.50 (eastbound)
Rip Van Winkle Bridge	NY 23	Catskill – Greenport	1935	42°13′24″N 73°51′01″W		$1.50 (eastbound)
Alfred H. Smith Memorial Bridge	CSX Castleton Subdivision	Selkirk – Castleton-on-Hudson	1924	42°30′31″N 73°46′30″W		
Castleton Bridge	Berkshire Connector	Coeymans – Schodack	1959	42°30′33″N 73°46′24″W		$1.05 (both directions, tolled as part of Thruway cost)
Maiden Lane Bridge (demolished 1960s)	Rail	Albany – Rensselaer	1871			
Dunn Memorial Bridge	US 9 / US 20	Albany – Rensselaer	1969	42°38′35″N 73°44′51″W		
Hudson River Bridge (demolished)	Rail	Albany – Rensselaer				
Livingston Avenue Bridge	CSX Hudson Subdivision and Amtrak	Albany – Rensselaer	1901	42°39′16″N 73°44′30″W		
Patroon Island Bridge	I-90	Albany – Rensselaer	1968	42°39′53″N 73°43′44″W		
Troy-Menands Bridge	NY 378	Menands – Troy	1933	42°42′04″N 73°42′08″W		
Congress Street Bridge	NY 2	Watervliet – Troy	1969	42°43′43″N 73°41′50″W		
Green Island Bridge		Green Island – Troy	1981	42°44′07″N 73°41′23″W		
Collar City Bridge	NY 7	Green Island – Troy	1980	42°44′25″N 73°41′18″W		
112th Street Bridge	NY 470	Cohoes – Troy	1922; 1996	42°46′17″N 73°40′53″W		
Troy–Waterford Bridge	US 4	Waterford – Troy	1804 (original); 1909 (replaced)	42°47′19″N 73°40′26″W		
Albany Northern Railroad Bridge (demolished)		Waterford – Troy				
Mechanicville Bridge	NY 67	Mechanicville – Schaghticoke	1888 (original); 1950 (replaced)	42°54′19″N 73°40′57″W		
Rail bridge	Pan Am Southern Railroad	Stillwater – Schaghticoke		42°55′10″N 73°40′19″W		
Stillwater Bridge	CR 125 / CR 125	Stillwater – Schaghticoke	1930	42°56′16″N 73°39′02″W		
Schuylerville Bridge	NY 29	Schuylerville – Easton		43°05′53″N 73°34′25″W		
Dix Bridge	CR 42 / CR 70	Schuylerville – Greenwich	1900 (original); 2013 (pedestrian)	43°07′00″N 73°34′53″W		
Hudson Valley Railway Bridge (demolished)		Northumberland – Greenwich		43°07′13″N 73°34′50″W		
Greenwich and Johnsonville Railway Bridge (demolished)		Northumberland – Greenwich		43°07′17″N 73°35′01″W		
Northumberland Bridge	US 4	Northumberland – Greenwich	1917	43°07′43″N 73°35′14″W		
Rail bridge	Canadian Pacific Rail and Amtrak	Moreau – Fort Edward		43°15′50″N 73°35′21″W		
Bridge	NY 197	Moreau – Fort Edward		43°15′52″N 73°35′25″W		
Sandy Hill Bridge (abandoned)		South Glens Falls – Hudson Falls				
Bridge	CR 27	South Glens Falls – Hudson Falls		43°17′50″N 73°35′23″W		
Cooper's Cave Bridge	US 9 / NY 32	South Glens Falls – Glens Falls	2004	43°18′20″N 73°38′28″W		
Saratoga-Queensbury Bridge	I-87	Moreau – Queensbury		43°15′48″N 73°40′35″W		
Irving H. Densmore Memorial Bridge	CR 9 / CR 16	Corinth – Lake Luzerne		43°14′55″N 73°49′56″W		
Bridge	NY 9N	Hadley – Lake Luzerne		43°18′17″N 73°49′58″W		
County Road 44 Bridge	CR 44	Hadley – Lake Luzerne	1931	43°19′00.9″N 73°50′32.7″W		
Rail bridge (not in use)	Former Delaware and Hudson Railroad line	Thurman – Warrensburg	1905	43°28′43″N 73°49′22″W		
Thurman Station Bridge	NY 418	Thurman – Warrensburg	1941	43°28′47″N 73°49′06″W		
The Glen Bridge	NY 28	Johnsburg – Chester	1959	43°34′57″N 73°51′36″W		
Riparius Bridge	NY 8	Johnsburg – Chester	2003	43°39′42″N 73°53′53″W		
North Creek Bridge	NY 28N	Johnsburg – Chester	1930	43°42′01″N 73°58′59″W		
Adirondack Railway bridge	Saratoga and North Creek Railroad			43°47′51″N 74°03′05″W		
Finch Pruyn Bridge	Pedestrian	Newcomb	1993	43°53′40″N 74°09′51″W		
Newcomb Bridge	NY 28N	Newcomb		43°57′57″N 74°07′54″W		
Bridge	Campsite Road	Newcomb		43°58′08″N 74°06′57″W		
Bridge	CR 25	Newcomb		43°57′57″N 74°03′00″W		
Bridge	Opolescent Road	Newcomb		44°00′58″N 74°03′14″W		
Bridge	CR 76	Tahawus		44°02′37″N 74°03′29″W		
Fill with culverts	Adirondack Park Reserve Road	Tahawus		44°03′04″N 74°03′45″W		
Wooden foot bridge just east of Henderson Lake outlet	Upper Works Trail	Tahawus		44°05′31″N 74°03′28″W		

== Planned crossings ==
The following crossings are planned. The crossings are listed from south to north.

Crossing	Will carry	Location	Planned completion	Coordinates
New Jersey – New York
Gateway Program Hudson Tunnel	Amtrak and NJ Transit	Weehawken Cove – West Side Yard	2035	40.75479°N 74.01677°W

== See also ==
- List of ferries across the Hudson River to New York City
- List of fixed crossings of the East River
- List of ferries across the East River
