= North Hoosick, New York =

- Hamlet
- Location within New York Location within the United States
- Coordinates: 42°55′41″N 73°20′34″W
- Country: United States
- State: New York
- County: Rensselaer
- Elevation: 446 ft (136 m)
- Time zone: UTC-5 (Eastern (EST))
  - Summer (DST): UTC-4 (EDT)
- ZIP code: 12133
- Area codes: 518 & 838
- GNIS feature ID: 958822

North Hoosick is a hamlet in Rensselaer County, New York, United States. The community is located along the Walloomsac River at the intersection of New York State Route 22 and New York State Route 67, 1.9 miles (3.1 km) north of Hoosick Falls. North Hoosick has a post office with ZIP code 12133.
