= New York State Route 418 =

State highway in Warren County, New York, US

New York State Route 418
- Map of the Warrensburg area with NY 418 highlighted in red

Route information
- Maintained by NYSDOT
- Length: 3.50 mi (5.63 km)
- Existed: 1930–present

Major junctions
- West end: CR 4 in Thurman
- East end: US 9 in Warrensburg

Location
- Country: United States
- State: New York
- Counties: Warren

Highway system
- New York Highways; Interstate; US; State; Reference; Parkways
← NY 417	→ NY 419

New York State Route 418 (NY 418) is a 3.50-mile (5.63 km) state highway located entirely within the Adirondack Park in Warren County, New York, in the United States. The route begins just west of the hamlet of Thurman Station, where Athol Road changes designations from County Route 4 (CR 4) to NY 418. It heads eastward through the towns of Thurman and Warrensburg, following the Schroon River to an intersection with U.S. Route 9 (US 9) in the hamlet of Warrensburg. All of NY 418 is part of the Dude Ranch Trail, a New York State Scenic Byway that runs through Warren County and Saratoga County.

The origins of NY 418 date back to the 19th century when Thurman Station and Warrensburg were first connected by way of a road. This highway was reconstructed by the state of New York during the early 1910s and added to the state highway system in 1915. It was designated as NY 418 as part of the 1930 renumbering of state highways in New York. The highway has remained mainly unchanged since, save for the replacement of its bridges over the Schroon and the Hudson Rivers in the 1930s and 1940s, respectively.

== Route description ==
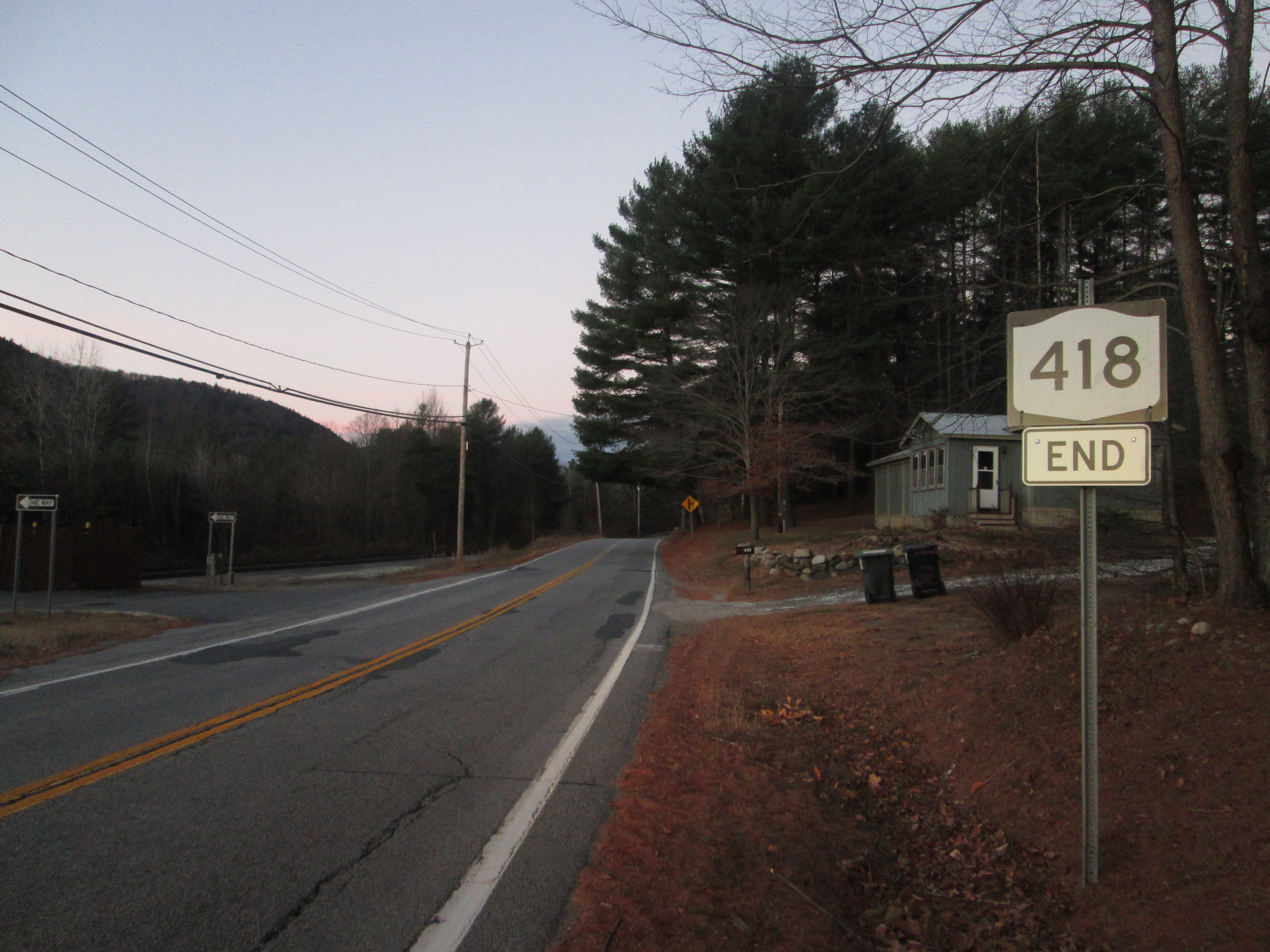
NY 418 at its western terminus in Thurman Station

NY 418 begins just southwest of Thurman Station, a hamlet within the town of Thurman, where Athol Road shifts from county maintenance (as CR 4) to state maintenance (as NY 418). It heads northeastward along the base of Sugarloaf Mountain, one of the Three Sisters Mountains, as it passes an area with very little development. The route continues along a northeasterly trek to Thurman Station, where it intersects with River Road in the center of the isolated community. At this point, the route turns southeastward and crosses the Upper Hudson River Railroad at-grade before passing over the Hudson River on the Thurman Station Bridge. NY 418 passes into the town of Warrensburg at the midpoint of the bridge.

On the opposite riverbank, the route turns eastward to follow the eastern bank of the Schroon River through an undeveloped portion of Warrensburg comprising little more than forests. The route winds along the bank of river to the hamlet of Warrensburg, where the route becomes River Street and heads past several blocks of houses. At Alden Avenue, the route curves to the northeast, mirroring the curvature of the river through Warrensburg. It continues along the waterway to the junction of Ridge and River Streets, where NY 418 turns north onto Richards Avenue and finally crosses the river on a truss bridge. The route meets Water Street (CR 9) on the opposite bank before continuing northward past several commercial properties to the center of Warrensburg, where NY 418 ends at an intersection with US 9 (Main Street).

== History ==
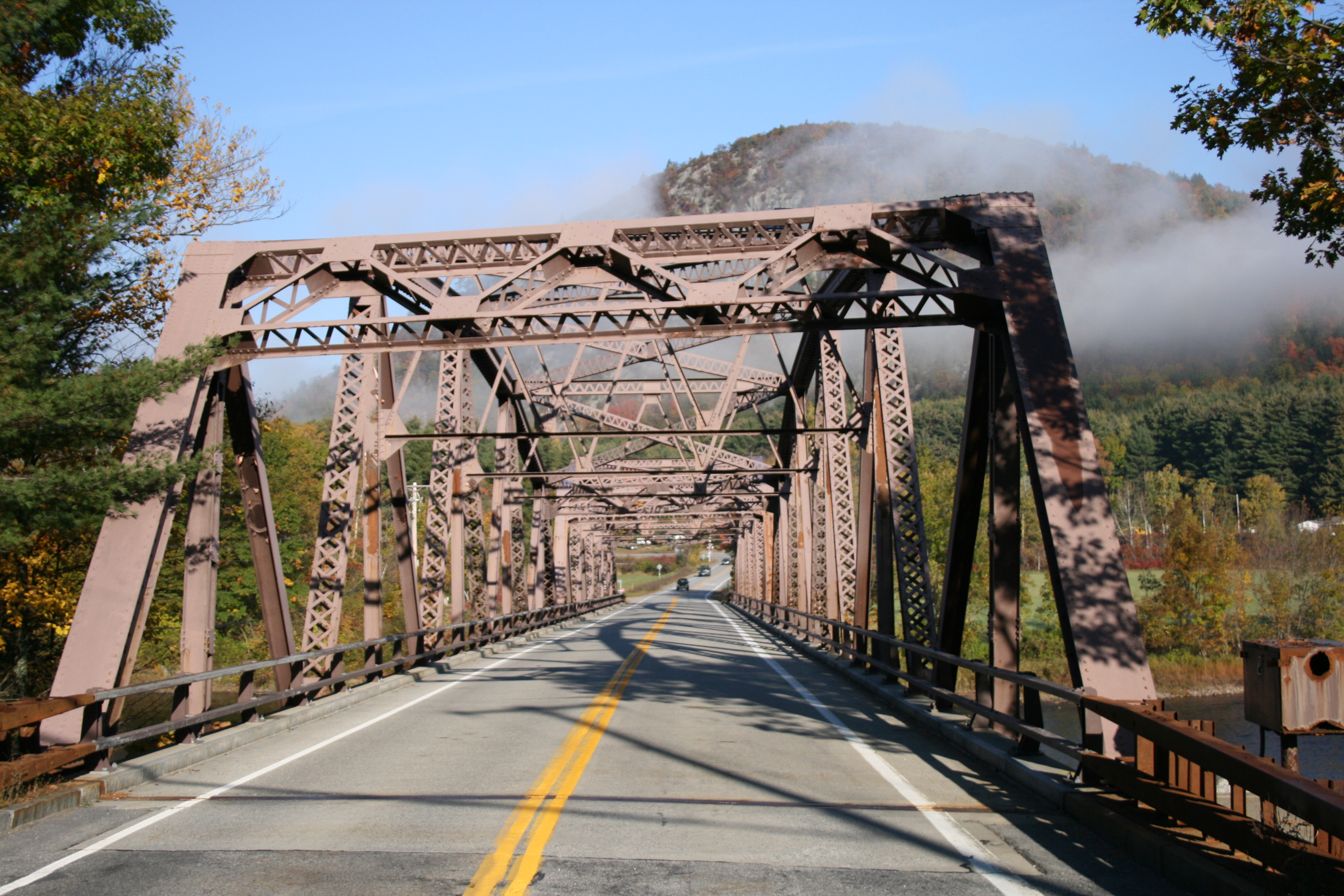
The Thurman Station Bridge over the Hudson River

The origins of NY 418 date back to 1896, by which time a road had been constructed between Thurman Station and Warrensburg. In 1912, the state of New York solicited bids for a project to improve the road to state highway standards. On June 12, 1912, the contract for the project was awarded to the Joseph Walker Construction Company of Albany for $35,776 (equivalent to $1,193,561 in 2025). About $3,400 worth of upgrades were made to the highway before the contract was cancelled. The state resolicited bids for the project in February 1914 and let a $35,231 (equivalent to $1,132,425 in 2025) contract for the project on February 20, 1914. The highway was rebuilt as a stone highway bound by asphalt. The upgraded highway was accepted into the state highway system on January 8, 1915.

The Thurman Station–Warrensburg state highway was designated as NY 418 as part of the 1930 renumbering of state highways in New York. NY 418's alignment has not been substantially altered since that time; however, parts of the route have been upgraded since 1930. In 1933, the original bridge that carried NY 418 over the Schroon River in Warrensburg was replaced with a new truss bridge 50.3 meters (165 ft) in length. The route's original bridge over the Hudson River near Thurman Station was replaced in 1941 with the Thurman Station Bridge, another truss bridge 133.5 meters (438 ft) long. The bridges were reconstructed by the New York State Department of Transportation in 2000 and 1995, respectively.

Parts of NY 418 run through a proposed tourism district known as the First Wilderness Heritage Corridor. The corridor, conceived by Warren County, is intended to revitalize the Hudson River corridor by turning it into a tourist destination. Areas currently being studied for future development include the primarily residential and agricultural areas around Thurman Station, the privately owned train station along NY 418 in this same area, and two vacant lots adjacent to the Hudson River on NY 418. At some point in time, the entire length of NY 418 was included as part of the Dude Ranch Trail, a New York State Scenic Byway that connects Lake George to the Hudson River.

== Major intersections ==
The entire route is in Warren County.

Location	mi	km	Destinations	Notes
Thurman	0.00	0.00	CR 4 (Athol Road)	End of state maintenance; continues west as CR 4
Town of Warrensburg	3.50	5.63	US 9 (Main Street) – Chestertown, Lake George	Hamlet of Warrensburg; eastern terminus
1.000 mi = 1.609 km; 1.000 km = 0.621 mi
