= Stillwater (village), New York =

Stillwater
- Village
- Village of Stillwater
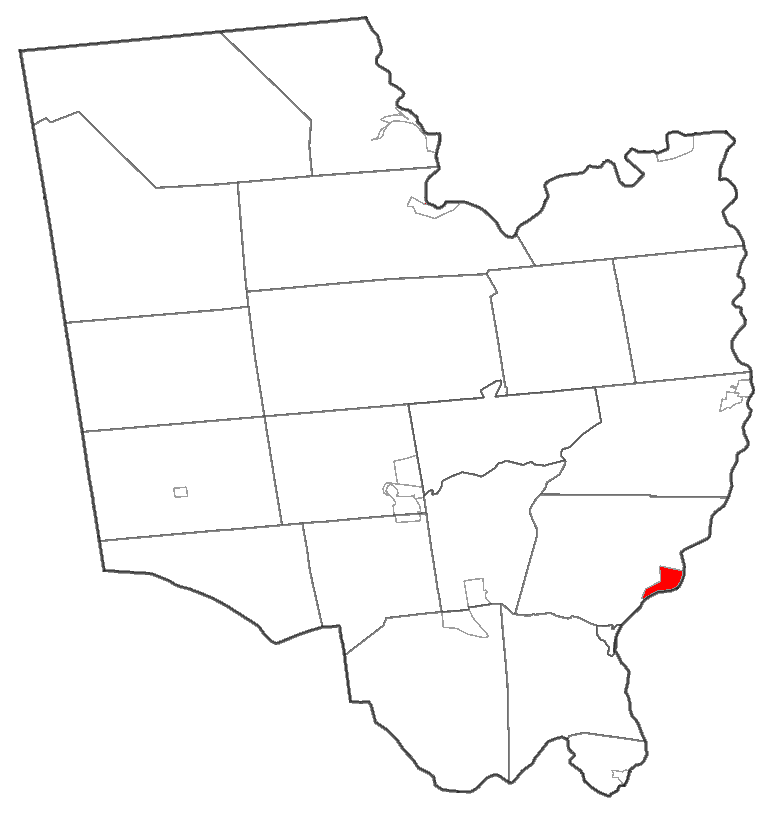
- Map highlighting Stillwater's location within Saratoga County.

- Location within the state of New York
- Coordinates: 42°56′25″N 73°39′2″W
- Country: United States
- State: New York
- County: Saratoga
- Incorporation: 1816

Government
  - Mayor: Judy Wood-Shaw

Area
  - Total: 1.46 sq mi (3.79 km^{2})
  - Land: 1.26 sq mi (3.26 km^{2})
  - Water: 0.20 sq mi (0.53 km^{2})
- Elevation: 92 ft (28 m)

Population (2020)
  - Total: 1,754
  - Density: 1,394.2/sq mi (538.32/km^{2})
- Time zone: UTC-5 (Eastern (EST))
  - Summer (DST): UTC-4 (EDT)
- ZIP code: 12170
- Area code: 518
- FIPS code: 36-71322
- GNIS feature ID: 0966435
- Website: Village of Stillwater

Stillwater is a village in Saratoga County, New York, United States. The population was 1,754 at the 2020 census. There is a hamlet in Minerva, Essex County with the same name, which has nothing to do with this village. The Village of Stillwater is in the southeastern part of the Town of Stillwater, north of the City of Mechanicville.

== History ==
Fort Ingoldsby was constructed in 1709, on the orders of Peter Schuyler, to protect the site of the future village. The village was incorporated in 1816. Stillwater is the current historical site of "The Blockhouse", since it has been moved from Saratoga battle field. Stillwater has other sites, such as the Octagon house and the twin houses built in the late 19th century. Stillwater plays an important role in Caleb Carr's period murder mystery The Angel of Darkness, published in 1997.

== Geography ==
Stillwater is located at 42°56′24″N 73°39′1″W (42.940172, -73.650437).

According to United States Census Bureau, the village has a total area of 1.4 square miles (3.7 km^{2}), of which 1.2 square miles (3.2 km^{2}) of it is land and 0.2 square mile (0.5 km^{2}) (13.29%) is water.

Stillwater is on the west side of the Hudson River. The Hudson River also serves as the county line of Rensselaer County. Schuyler Creek enters the Hudson River at the village. U.S. Route 4 passes through the village, conjoined with New York State Route 32 as Hudson Avenue. County Road 76, Lake Road, ends its county designation at the village line where it becomes Lake Street. Rensselaer County Road 125, Stillwater Bridge Road, terminates from the east at the county border.

== Demographics ==
Historical population
Census	Pop.	Note	%±
1870	737		—
1880	877		19.0%
1890	747		−14.8%
1900	1,007		34.8%
1910	1,004		−0.3%
1920	982		−2.2%
1930	1,051		7.0%
1940	971		−7.6%
1950	1,276		31.4%
1960	1,398		9.6%
1970	1,428		2.1%
1980	1,572		10.1%
1990	1,531		−2.6%
2000	1,644		7.4%
2010	1,738		5.7%
2020	1,754		0.9%
U.S. Decennial Census

As of the census of 2000, there were 1,644 people, 616 households, and 450 families residing in the village. The population density was 1,328.1 inhabitants per square mile (512.8/km^{2}). There were 669 housing units at an average density of 540.5 per square mile (208.7/km^{2}). The racial makeup of the village was 97.81% White, 0.30% Black or African American, 0.18% Native American, 0.73% Asian, 0.06% Pacific Islander, 0.24% from other races, and 0.67% from two or more races. Hispanic or Latino of any race were 0.85% of the population.

There were 616 households, out of which 39.1% had children under the age of 18 living with them, 54.1% were married couples living together, 13.8% had a female householder with no husband present, and 26.8% were non-families. 21.9% of all households were made up of individuals, and 11.0% had someone living alone who was 65 years of age or older. The average household size was 2.67 and the average family size was 3.14.

In the village, the population was spread out, with 29.1% under the age of 18, 6.8% from 18 to 24, 31.4% from 25 to 44, 20.1% from 45 to 64, and 12.6% who were 65 years of age or older. The median age was 35 years. For every 100 females, there were 92.1 males. For every 100 females age 18 and over, there were 87.3 males.

The median income for a household in the village was $43,516, and the median income for a family was $50,577. Males had a median income of $35,667 versus $27,250 for females. The per capita income for the village was $17,221. About 7.8% of families and 10.8% of the population were below the poverty line, including 14.3% of those under age 18 and 9.7% of those age 65 or over.
