= Castleton Bridge =

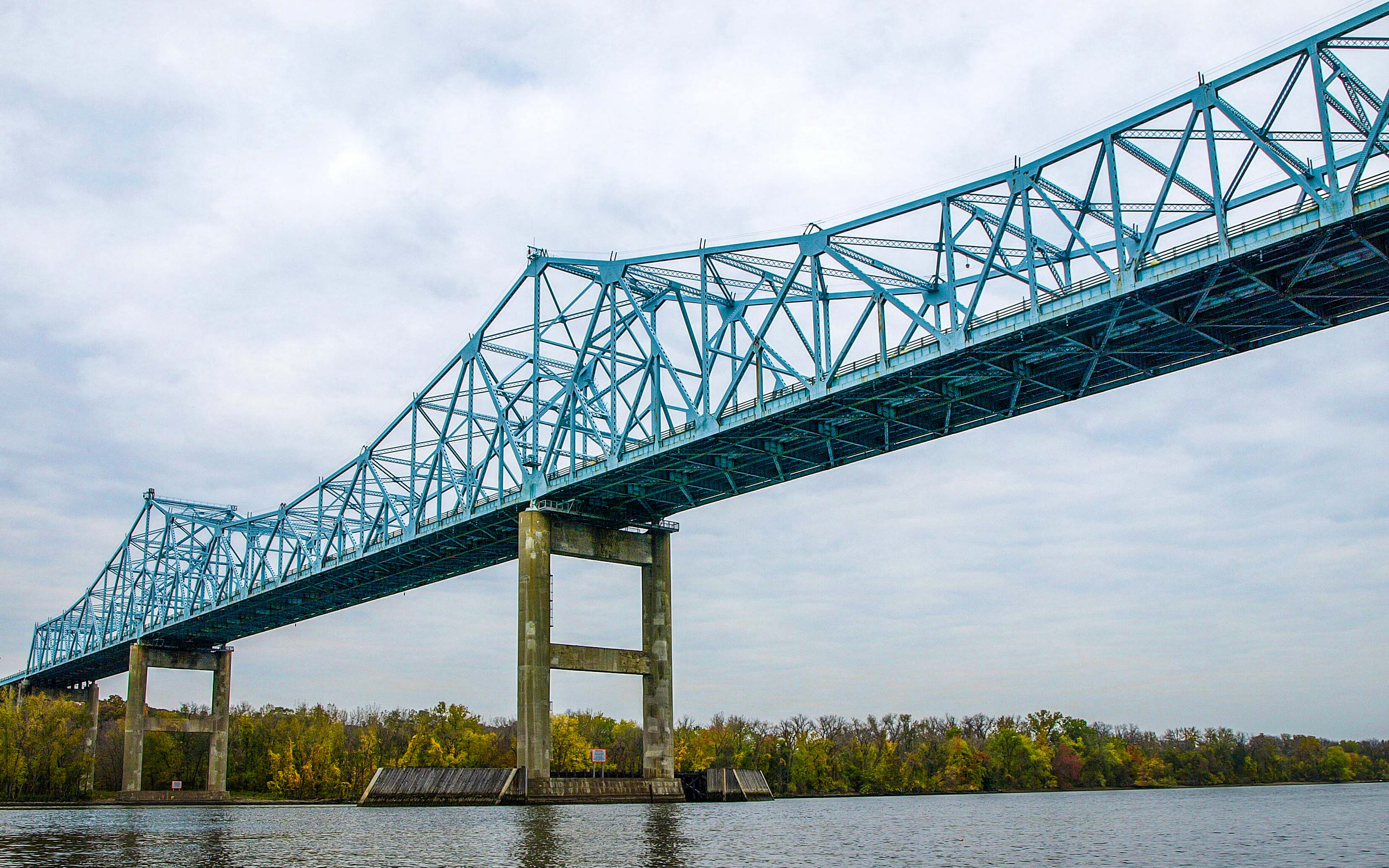
- Coordinates: 42.5099°N 73.775°W
- Carries: 4 lanes of Berkshire Connector
- Crosses: Hudson River
- Locale: Castleton-on-Hudson, New York
- Other name: Castleton-on-Hudson Bridge
- Maintained by: NYSTA

Characteristics
- Design: Cantilever
- Longest span: 182 meters (597 ft)
- Clearance above: (?)
- Clearance below: 135 feet (41 m)

History
- Opened: May 26, 1959; 66 years ago

Statistics
- Toll: $1.05 (both directions)

Location
- Interactive map of Castleton Bridge

The Castleton Bridge is a cantilever truss bridge over the Hudson River, connecting Coeymans, Albany County with Schodack, Rensselaer County in New York. It carries the Berkshire Connector of the New York State Thruway. This bridge is also sometimes called the Castleton-on-Hudson Bridge and is situated in close proximity to the Alfred H. Smith Memorial Bridge, which is used by rail traffic.

The Castleton Bridge is located on the longest section of the New York State Thruway that does not have an Interstate Highway designation, between exits 21A (I-87) and B1 (I-90). There is a $0.62 toll each way to cross this bridge. It is not collected at a separate toll barrier, but is rather collected as part of the Thruway's closed toll system. It costs at least $1.05 to cross ($1.00 with an E-ZPass discount), by traveling between exits 22 and B1 on the Thruway. It is the northernmost road bridge on the Hudson River with a toll and is the only bridge with a toll in both directions (collected as part of the Thruway's existing ticketed toll system); every road bridge south of this has an eastbound-only toll.

Photos of the bridge

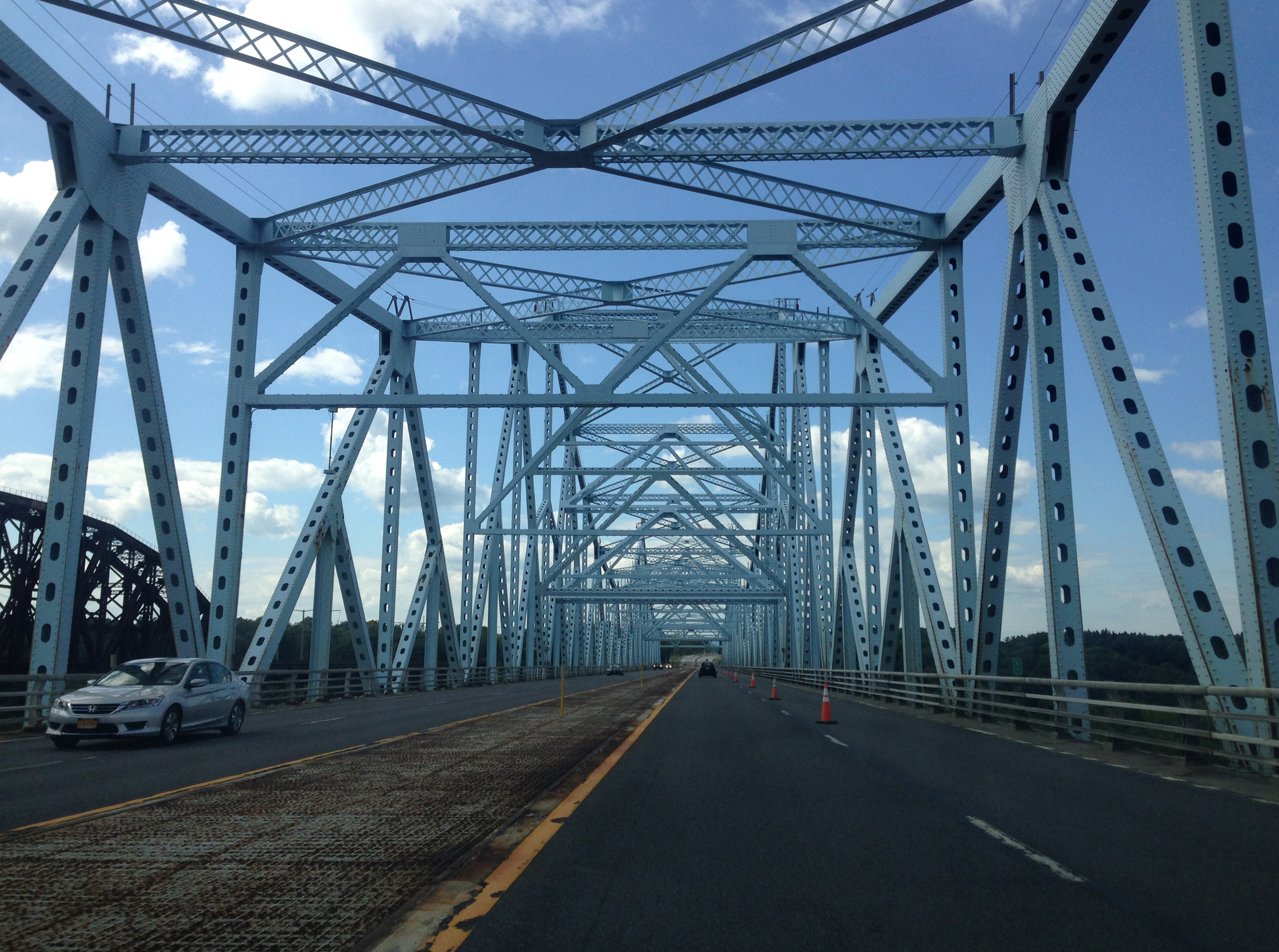
The view on the bridge

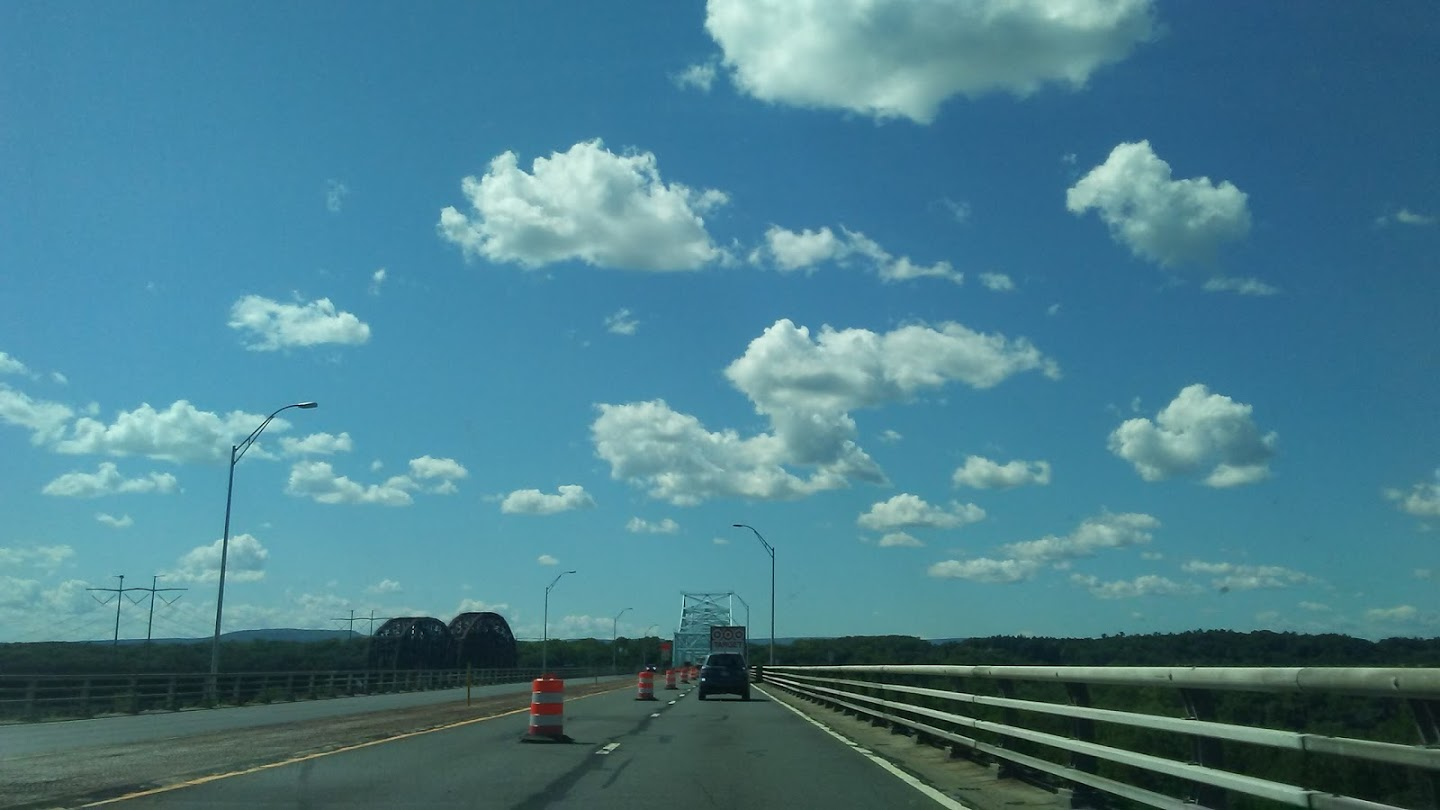
The view from about 1/2 a mile away

== History ==
The bridge was built in the late 1950s, and opened May 26, 1959 to coincide with the opening of the final 6-mile segment of the New York State Thruway's Berkshire Section connecting to the Massachusetts Turnpike.

L-Tech Coatings completed updates as painting contractor for BBL Construction in two seasons in 1985 and 1986.

In May 2007, the bridge carried 14,500 vehicles per day. NYSDOT, FHWA and NYSTA have discussed potential strategies to divert peak hour traffic traveling along Interstate 90 between exit 24 and exit B1 to the Castleton Bridge to reduce traffic volumes on the Patroon Island Bridge in Albany.

In 2023, a $47.6 million project was started on the Castleton Bridge which included the deck replacement of the westbound travel lanes, repairs to the deck on the eastbound travel lanes, replacement of the center median and bridge steel repairs.

== See also ==
- List of fixed crossings of the Hudson River
