= Numbered highways in New York =

Highway system

- Standard route shields in New York

Highway names
- Interstates: Interstate X (I-X)
- US Highways: U.S. Route X (US X)
- State: New York State Route X (NY X)

System links
- New York Highways; Interstate; US; State; Reference; Parkways

The New York State Department of Transportation (NYSDOT) is responsible for the establishment and classification of a state highway network which includes Interstate Highways, U.S. Highways, and state routes. U.S. and Interstate Highways are classified as state routes in New York; however, a letter ("U" or "I", respectively) is suffixed to the number of the route. As a result, there is apparent duplication between U.S. Routes, Interstate Highways and state routes.

The New York state highway system is supplemented by the state's county route system, which comprises a series of highways numbered and maintained by the individual county highway departments. While neighboring New Jersey employs a statewide numbering system, no such system exists in New York. Instead, each county numbers its highways independently of other counties. As a result, county routes typically change numbers when they cross county lines.

In some cases, the state highway and county highway systems overlap. More specifically, some portions of U.S. Routes and state routes in New York are signed as U.S. Routes or state routes but are maintained by the county that the route lies within. These county-maintained segments also carry a county route designation that may or may not be posted alongside the U.S. or state designation, depending on the signing practices of the county. Some state routes, such as New York State Route 148 in Niagara County, are entirely county-maintained.

== Lists of routes ==
Interstate Highways: A list of Interstate Highways within New York.
U.S. Routes: A list of U.S. Highways within New York.
State routes: A list of all state routes, past and present, within New York. A list containing just state routes that no longer exist also exists.
Reference routes: A list of all of New York's reference routes—all state-maintained highways that are not part of a state route.
County routes: An article on county routes in New York. Contains links to by-county route lists.....
Parkways

== Thruway ==
Highways maintained by the New York State Thruway Authority lack any signed numbers apart from Interstate Highway designations. While the vast majority of the Thruway system is part of the Interstate Highway System, some sections, such as the Berkshire Connector between Interstate 87 and Interstate 90, are unsigned reference routes. There are no standard NYSDOT reference markers on any of the highways; instead, the Thruway Authority posts their own mileposts, which (aside from the mainline) bear special Thruway codes.

== See also ==
- Transportation in New York
- List of New York State Bicycle Routes
