= The Glen Bridge =

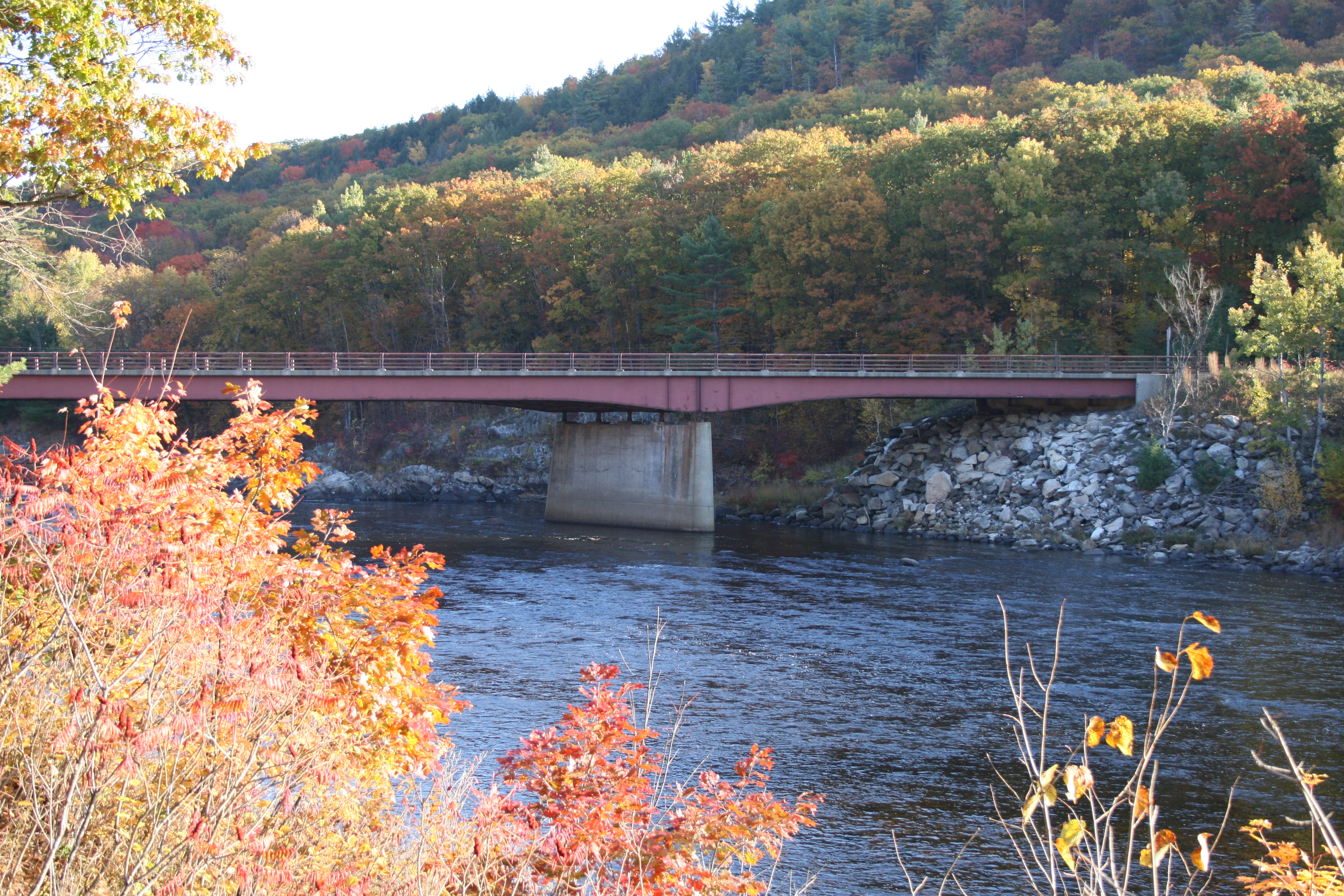
- South view from the western shore
- Coordinates: 43°34′34″N 73°51′22″W
- Carries: 2 traffic lanes of NY 28
- Crosses: Hudson River
- Locale: Johnsburg and Chester, New York
- Official name: The Glen Bridge
- Other name(s): The Glen Bridge
- Maintained by: New York State Department of Transportation

Characteristics
- Design: girder bridge

History
- Opened: 1959

The Glen Bridge is a two lane bridge that carries NY 28 across the Hudson River connecting Johnsburg, New York with Chester, built in 1959.

== See also ==
- List of fixed crossings of the Hudson River
