= Schuylerville Bridge =

Bridge in New York, United States

- Coordinates: 43°5′54.85″N 73°34′31.39″W
- Carries: NY 29
- Crosses: Hudson River
- Locale: Schuylerville, Saratoga County to Easton in Washington County both in New York, United States

Location
- Interactive map of Schuylerville Bridge

Schuyler Bridge carries New York State Route 29 (NY 29) across the Hudson River east of U.S. Route 4 and NY 32 from Schuylerville in Saratoga County into Easton in Washington County. It was named for Philip Schuyler, a general in the American Revolution. NY 29 is named the General Philip Schuyler Memorial Highway west of Schuylerville.

== See also ==
- List of fixed crossings of the Hudson River
