= Congress Street Bridge (New York) =

Bridge in Watervliet and Troy, New York

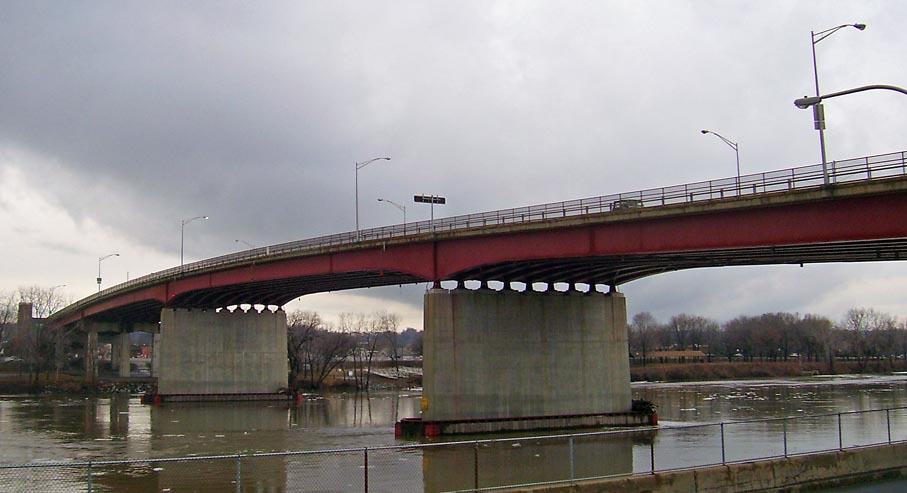
- The Congress Street Bridge seen from Troy
- Coordinates: 42°43′43.69″N 73°41′50″W
- Carries: NY 2
- Crosses: Hudson River
- Locale: Watervliet and Troy, NY
- Official name: Congress Street Bridge
- Maintained by: New York State Department of Transportation
- ID number: 1004279

Characteristics
- Design: Steel Girder
- Clearance below: 55 ft (17 m)

Location
- Interactive map of Congress Street Bridge

The Congress Street Bridge carries NY 2 across the Hudson River connecting Watervliet, New York, with Troy, New York.

The bridge has slated improvements to bring multimodal transportation to this bridge.

== See also ==
- List of fixed crossings of the Hudson River
