= Mechanicville Bridge =

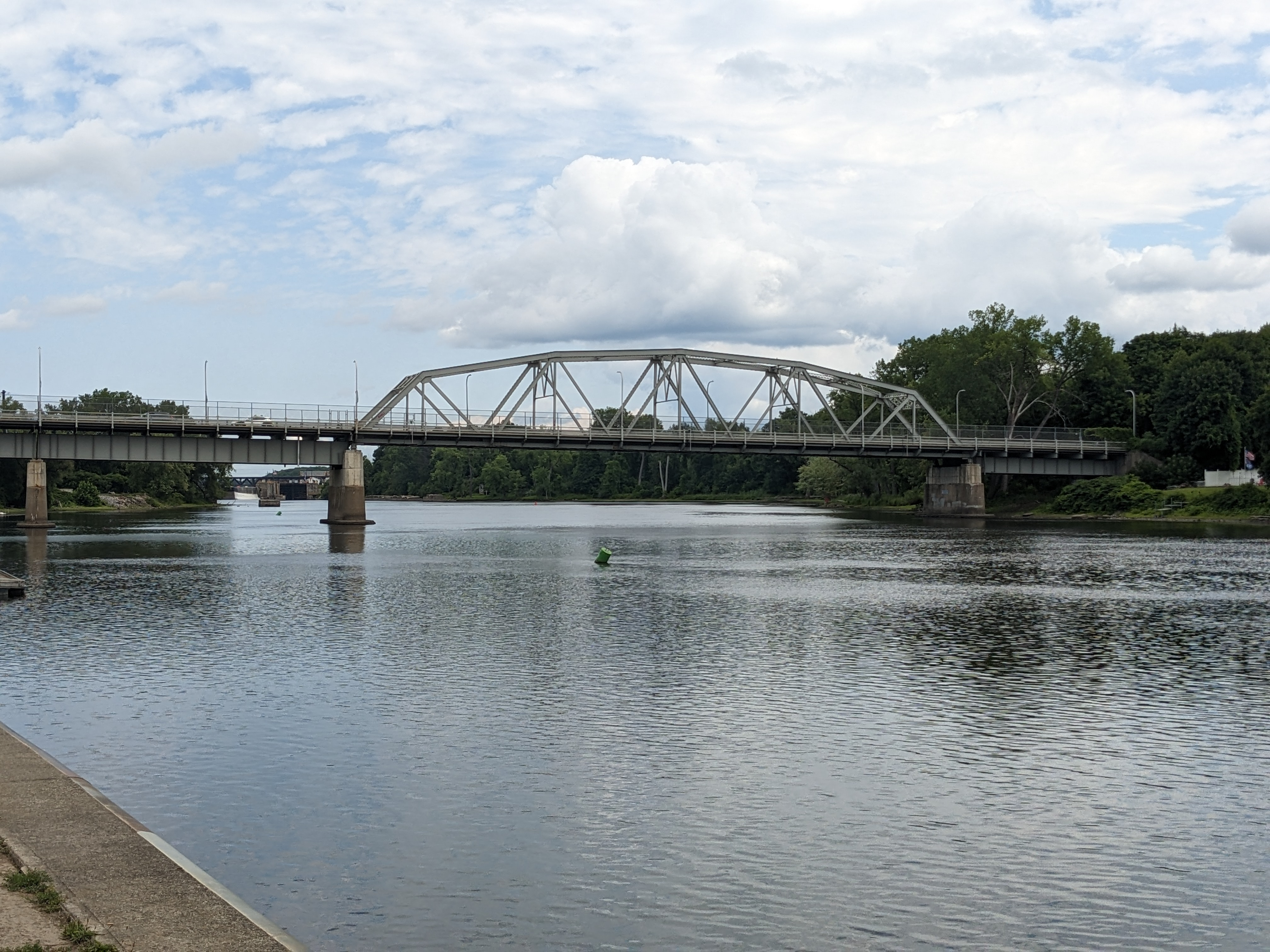
- Coordinates: 42°54′19.76″N 73°40′57.36″W
- Carries: NY 67
- Crosses: Hudson River
- Locale: Mechanicville, Saratoga County and Schaghticoke, Rensselaer County, both in New York, United States
- Official name: Mechanicville-Hemstreet Park Veterans Memorial Bridge

History
- Opened: 1950

The Mechanicville Bridge (also known as the Hemstreet Park Bridge) carries New York State Route 67 across the Hudson River in New York connecting Mechanicville with Hemstreet Park in the Town of Schaghticoke. The bridge was built in 1950 as a replacement for a structure privately built as a toll bridge in 1888, and is referred to by some as the Champlain Canal Bridge.

== See also ==
- List of crossings of the Hudson River
