= Troy–Waterford Bridge =

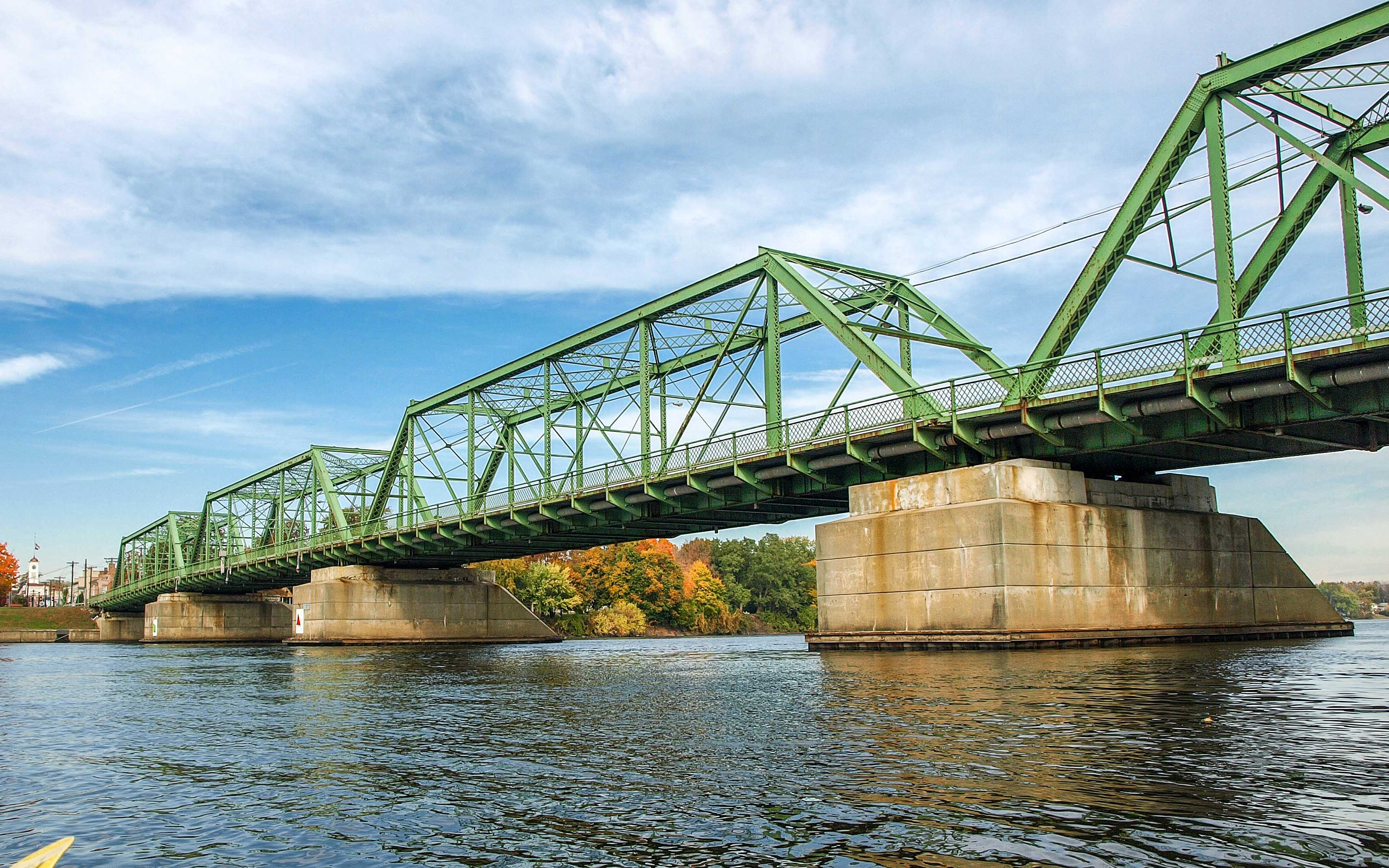
- Troy–Waterford Bridge in October 2009
- Coordinates: 42°47′19.32″N 73°40′25.92″W
- Carries: US 4
- Crosses: Hudson River
- Locale: Waterford, Saratoga County and Troy, Rennsselaer County, both in New York, United States

Characteristics
- Design: Truss bridge
- Total length: 742.8 feet (226.4 m)
- Longest span: 193.9 feet (59.1 m)
- Clearance above: 15.4 feet (4.7 m)

History
- Opened: 1909

Statistics
- Daily traffic: 12,435 (2007)

Location
- Interactive map of Troy–Waterford Bridge

The Troy–Waterford Bridge carries U.S. Route 4 across the Hudson River in New York connecting Waterford with Troy. The bridge is two lanes wide, with sidewalks on both sides. The bridge serves as a replacement for the 1804-built Union Bridge, which burned on July 10, 1909.

The Waterford Bridges, which include the current bridge and the original 1804 bridge, were designated as a National Historic Civil Engineering Landmark by the American Society of Civil Engineers in 2013.

The Troy–Waterford Bridge uses the same piers as the original 1804 bridge, and if that bridge is counted, it was the first bridge across the Hudson River south of the Adirondacks. At first it carried pedestrians and horse drawn vehicles, but a railroad track was added to it when the locomotive was invented. The current bridge has no railroad tracks.

== See also ==
- List of fixed crossings of the Hudson River
