= Thurman Station Bridge =

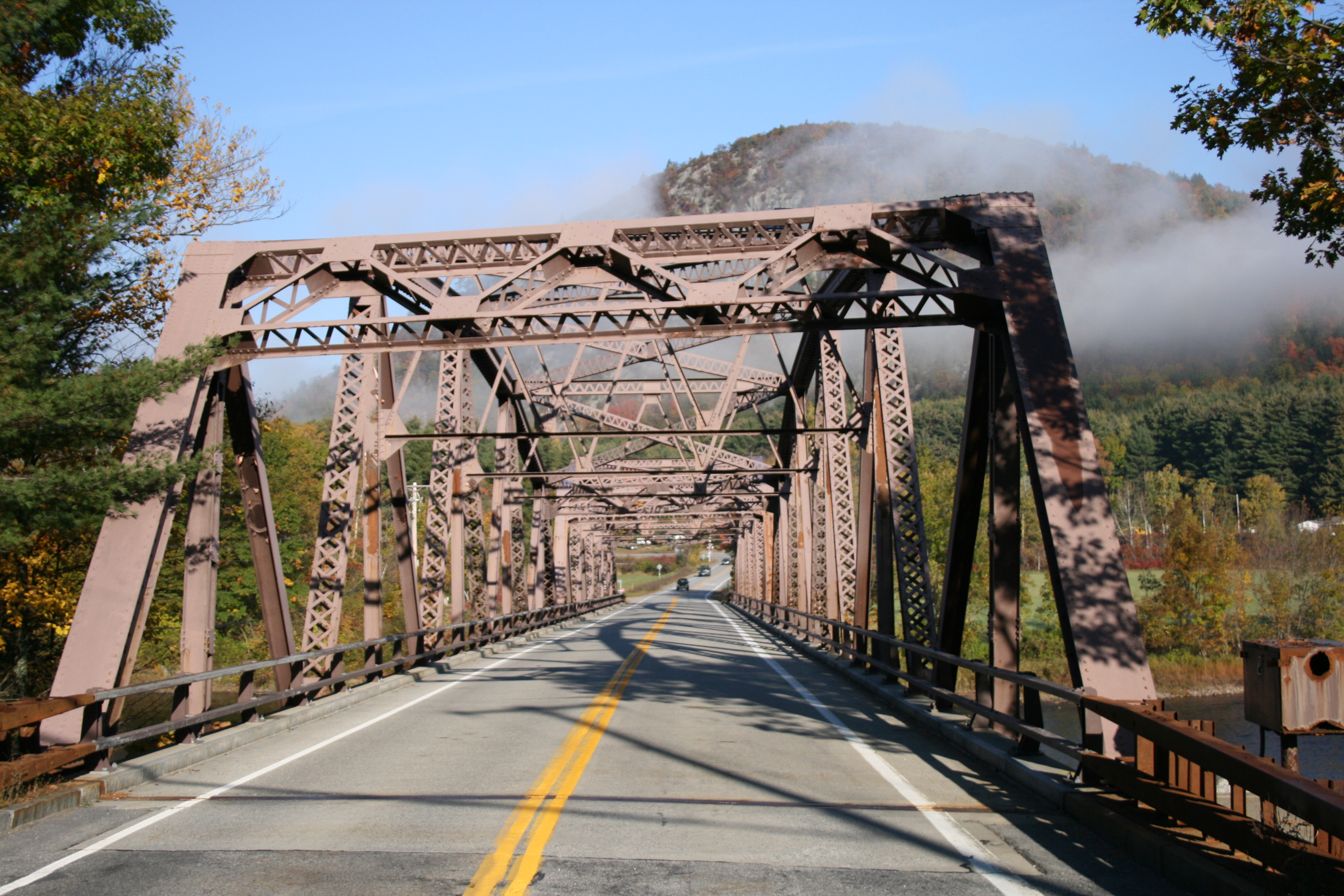
- View from Warrensburg side
- Coordinates: 43°28′47″N 73°49′6″W
- Carries: 2 traffic lanes of NY 418
- Crosses: Hudson River
- Locale: Thurman, New York and Warrensburg, New York, New York
- Official name: Thurman Station Bridge
- Maintained by: New York State Department of Transportation

Characteristics
- Design: steel truss bridge

History
- Opened: 1941

The Thurman Station Bridge is a two–lane bridge that carries NY 418 across the Hudson River connecting Thurman, New York with Warrensburg, New York. It was built in 1941.

== See also ==
- List of fixed crossings of the Hudson River
