= Stillwater Bridge (Hudson River, New York) =

- Coordinates: 42.938113°N 73.650885°W
- Carries: Two lanes of Stillwater Bridge Road (NY 915C)
- Crosses: Hudson River
- Locale: Saratoga–Rensselaer counties, New York, United States

Characteristics
- Design: Pony truss bridge
- Total length: 663.71 feet (202.30 m)
- Longest span: 109.9 feet (33.5 m)

History
- Opened: 1930

Statistics
- Daily traffic: 3,650 (1990)

Stillwater Bridge is a truss bridge in the Capital District of New York in the United States. It carries Stillwater Bridge Road (New York State Route 915C or NY 915C, an unsigned reference route) across the Hudson River from the village of Stillwater in Saratoga County to the town of Schaghticoke in Rensselaer County. The bridge is two lanes wide and has a sidewalk only along the south side of the road.

Stillwater Bridge begins at an intersection with U.S. Route 4 and NY 32 in Stillwater. From here, it heads southeast across the Hudson River to Stillwater Island, an island in Schaghticoke bounded by the river to the west and the Champlain Canal to the east. On Stillwater Island, Stillwater Bridge Road serves Lock 4 State Canal Park at the mouth of the Hoosic River and changes designations from NY 915C to County Route 125. A smaller truss bridge brings Stillwater Bridge Road across the Champlain Canal and onto the mainland of the town of Schaghticoke.

The bridge carried NY 67 across the Hudson River until 1980, when NY 67 was realigned to cross the river at Mechanicville 3 miles (4.8 km) to the south.

== See also ==
- List of fixed crossings of the Hudson River
