= Riparius Bridge =

Bridge across the Hudson River, New York, United States

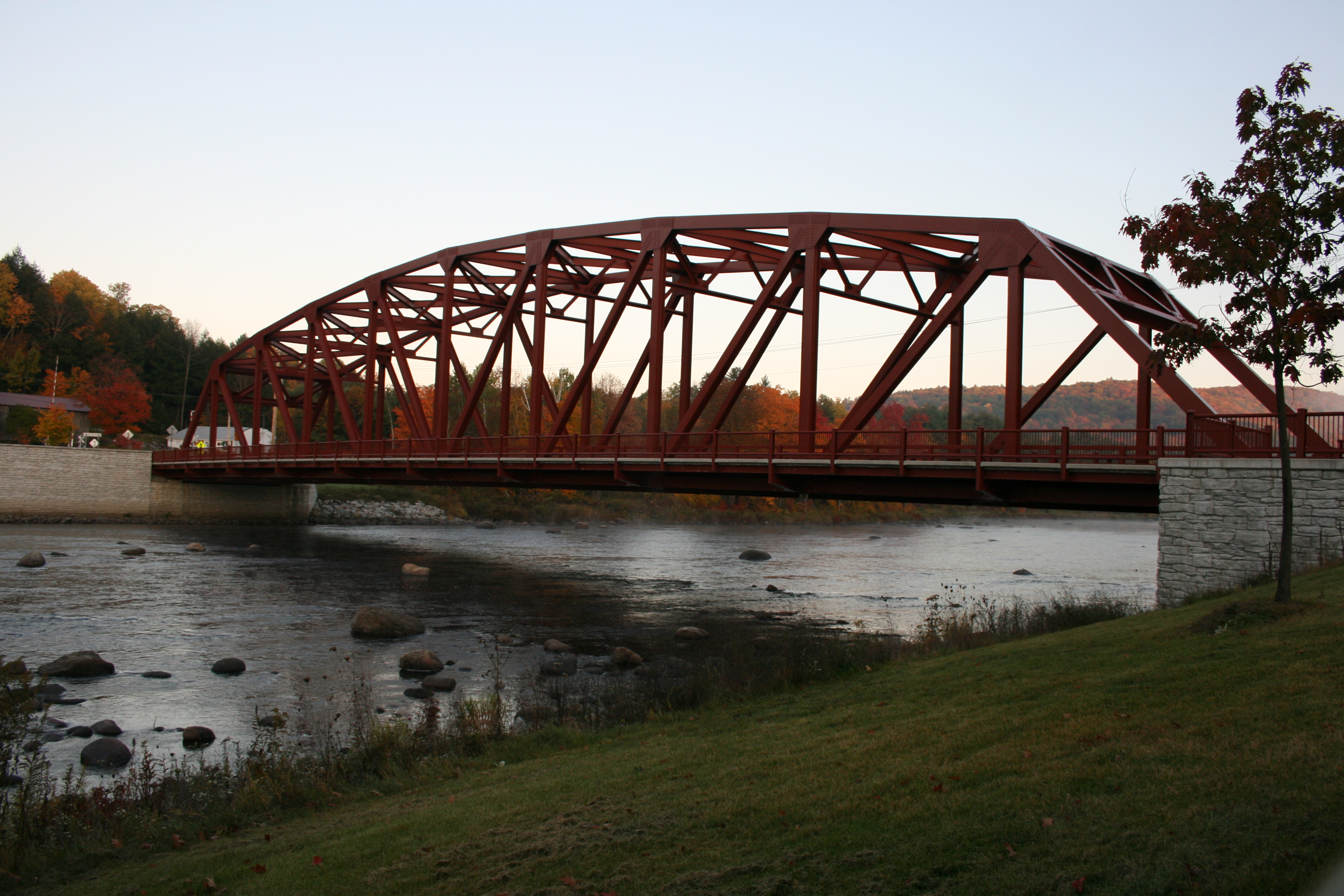
- South view from the eastern shore
- Coordinates: 43°39′42″N 73°53′53″W
- Carries: 2 traffic lanes of NY 8
- Crosses: Hudson River
- Locale: Johnsburg and Chester, New York
- Official name: Riparius Bridge
- Other name: The Bridge at Riparius
- Maintained by: New York State Department of Transportation

Characteristics
- Design: steel Parker (Camelback) truss bridge

History
- Opened: 2003

Location
- Interactive map of Riparius Bridge

The Riparius Bridge is a two lane truss bridge that carries New York State Route 8 across the Hudson River connecting Johnsburg, New York with Chestertown, New York. It was built in 2003, replacing a similar style camelback truss bridge that had been built in 1919. The new bridge was built to better accommodate vehicles, bicycles, and pedestrians.

Looking west over the Riparius Bridge, 2024

== See also ==
- List of fixed crossings of the Hudson River
