= North Creek (South Dakota) =

Stream in South Dakota, U.S.

Coordinates: 45°37′35″N 103°14′16″W

North Creek is a stream in the U.S. state of South Dakota.

North Creek runs north of Slim Buttes, hence the name.

== See also ==
- List of rivers of South Dakota
- List of rivers of the United States
