= North Creek Bridge =

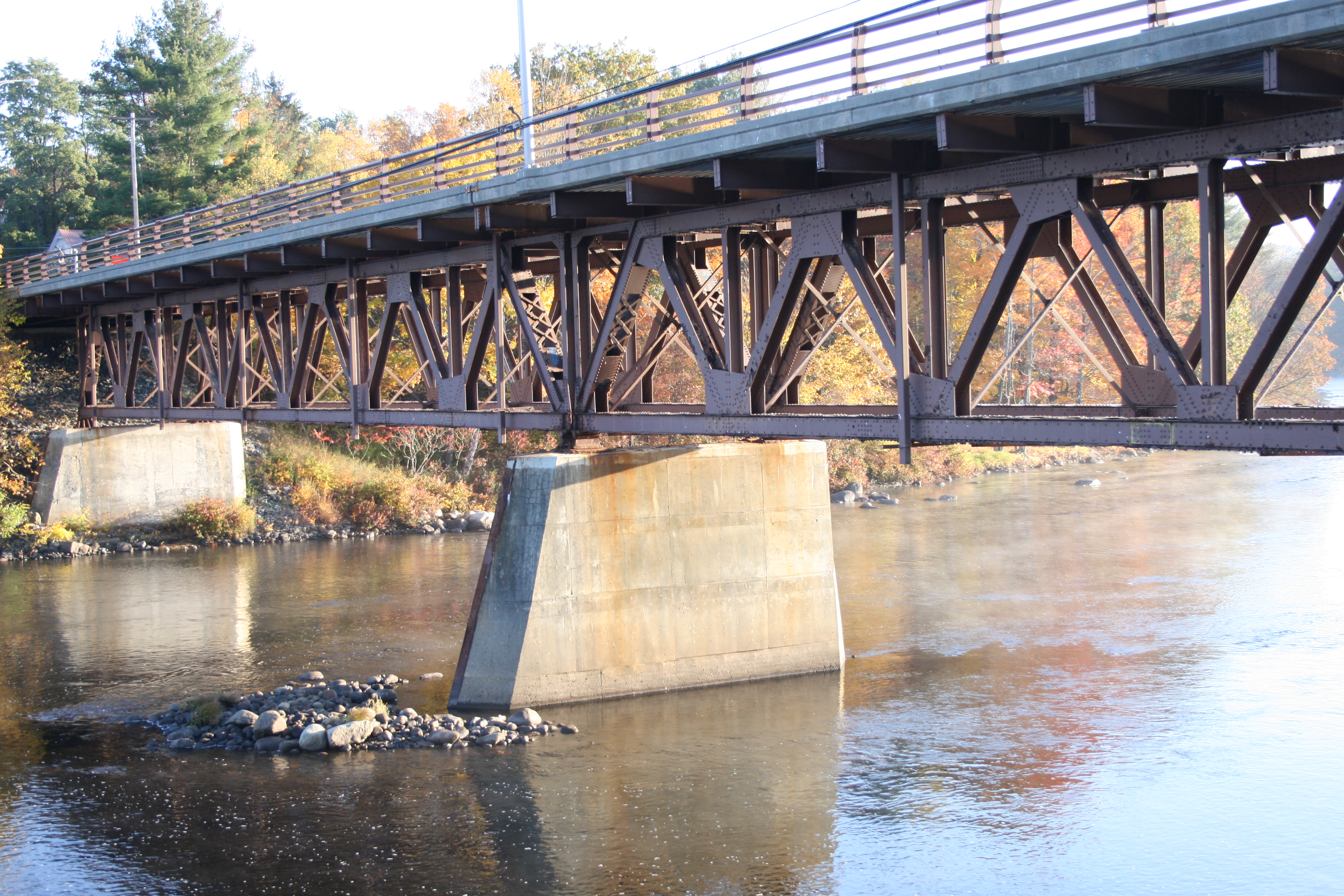
- North view from the western shore
- Coordinates: 43°42′1″N 73°58′59″W
- Carries: 2 traffic lanes of NY 28N
- Crosses: Hudson River
- Locale: Johnsburg and Chester, New York
- Official name: North Creek Bridge
- Other name(s): North Creek Bridge
- Maintained by: New York State Department of Transportation

Characteristics
- Design: steel Warren deck truss

History
- Opened: 1930

The North Creek Bridge is a two lane bridge that carries New York State Route 28N across the Hudson River connecting North Creek in the Town of Johnsburg with the Town of Chester, New York built in 1930.

== See also ==
- List of fixed crossings of the Hudson River
