= Patroon Island Bridge =

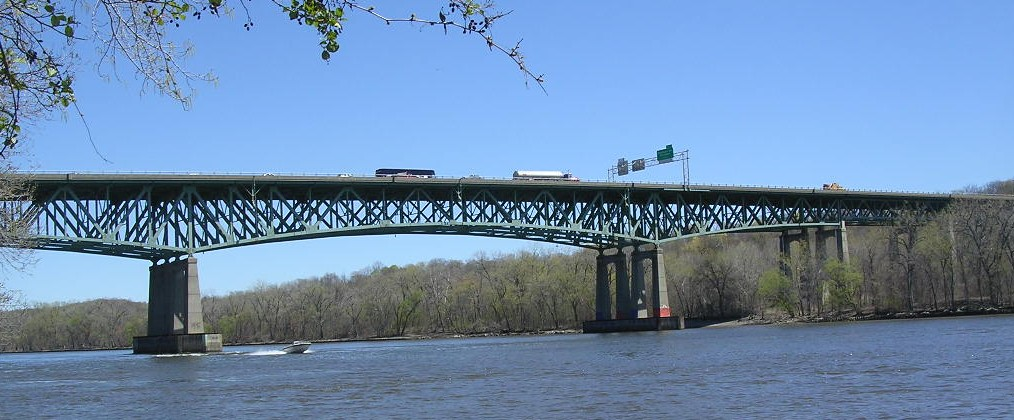
- Coordinates: 42.665°N 73.729°W
- Carries: 6 lanes of I-90
- Crosses: Hudson River
- Locale: Albany, New York and Rensselaer, New York
- Maintained by: New York State Department of Transportation
- ID number: 1092839

Characteristics
- Design: Deck truss
- Total length: 1,795 ft (547 m)
- Width: 89 ft (27 m)
- Longest span: 375 ft (114 m)
- Clearance above: Open
- Clearance below: 60 ft (18.3 m)

History
- Opened: September 24, 1969

Statistics
- Daily traffic: 70,787

The Patroon Island Bridge is a multi-span deck truss bridge that spans the Hudson River in Albany and Rensselaer in the state of New York. A major crossing, it carries Interstate 90 in the east–west direction between Albany and Rensselaer Counties. It has been in service since 1968, with structural repairs made in 1992, and a comprehensive renovation/retrofit completed in 2016.

The bridge's name comes from the former Lower Patroon Island that once existed adjacent to the bridge, the channel of which dividing it from the western mainland was infilled for the construction of the bridge. A patroon was a proprietor of a tract of land in the 17th-century Dutch colony of New Netherland in North America.

== Design ==
The bridge consists of ten spans. Seven spans are considered the main spans and consist of steel trusses and concrete decks. The other three spans are considered approach spans, which are supported by plate girders. The main span over the river-shipping channel is 375 feet (114 m) long and 89 feet (27 m) wide, and the overall bridge length is 1,795 feet (547 m). There is an estimated 60 feet (18 m) of clearance for shipping on the Hudson River below, which changes with the local tide. The bridge has an HS Inventory load rating of 35 short tons (31 long tons; 32 t), and is inspected annually. The average daily traffic count was 70,787 in 1998 with a 4.5 percent estimated traffic growth during the life of the bridge.

== Renovation ==
The bridge's design and age was similar to that of the Interstate 35W bridge in Minneapolis, MN, which collapsed during rush hour on August 1, 2007. This realization by New York State transportation officials prompted full-scale inspections of the state's major highway bridges, including the Patroon Island Bridge. Subsequently, the bridge was deemed safe for the time being, but would need substantial repairs and retrofitting in order to ensure motorist safety, and to extend its useful service life if replacement was found not to be a viable option in the near future. On May 31, 2016, the New York State Department of Transportation declared that it had completed a $148-million-dollar renovation and rebuild of the bridge.

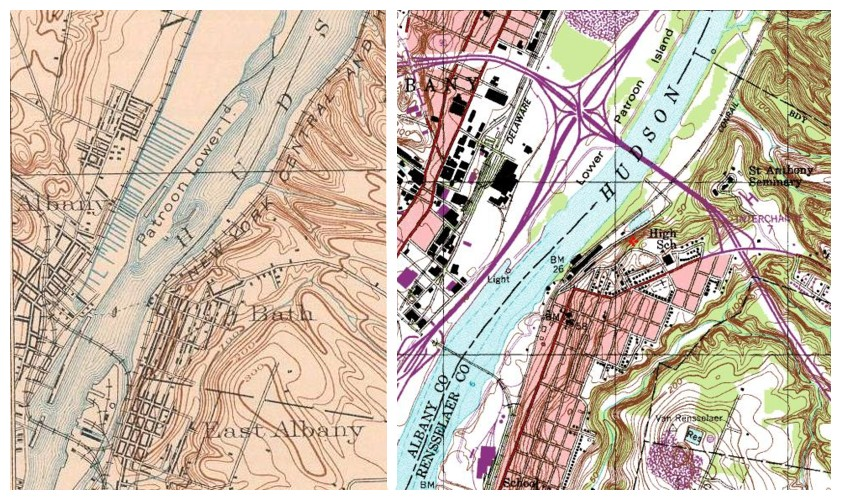
Lower Patroon Island on 1927 map (left) and after the bridge was built (right)

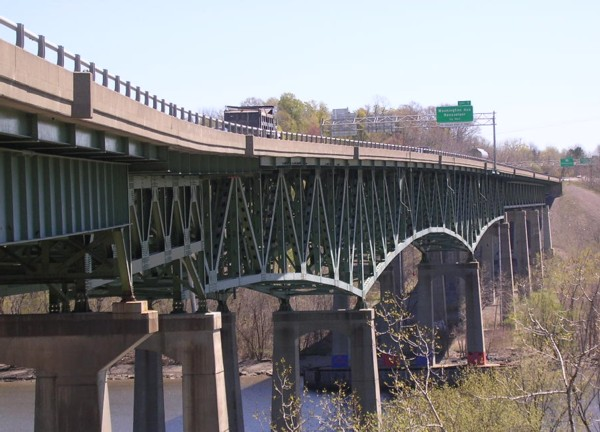
The bridge's roadbed is supported by a combination of steel girders and trusses, held up by concrete piers

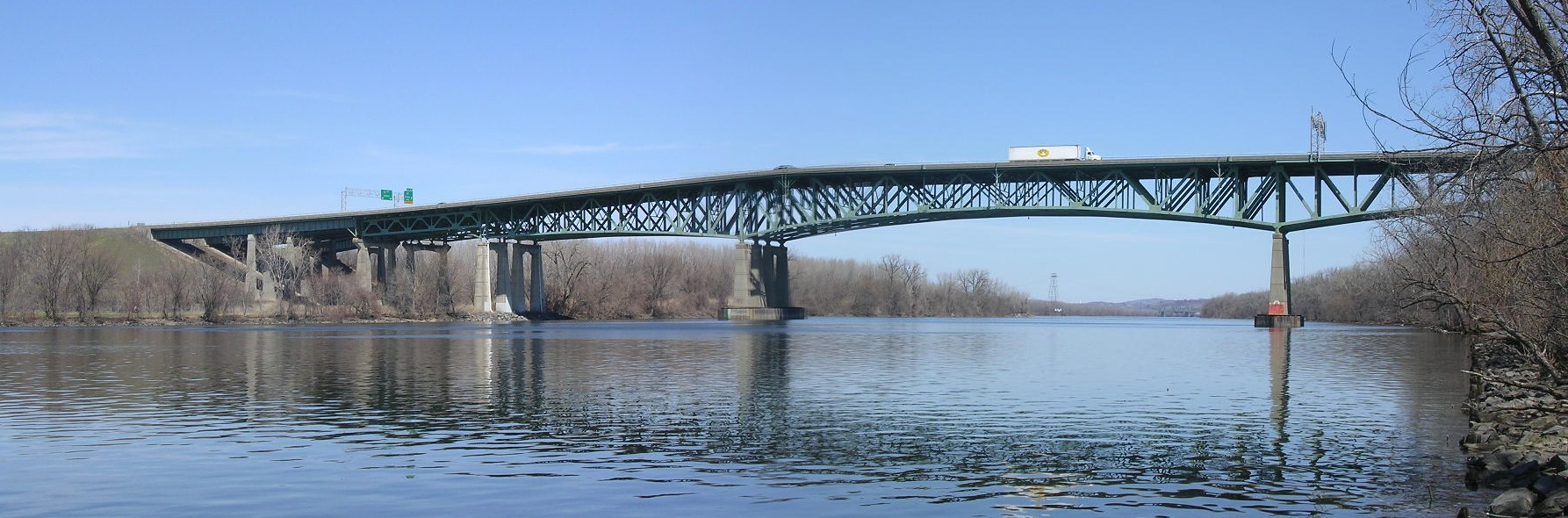
Patroon Island Bridge, a multilane interstate highway crossing, carries I-90 over the Hudson River, Albany, New York (Menands Bridge barely visible upstream)

== See also ==
- List of fixed crossings of the Hudson River
