= Schroon Lake =

Schroon Lake may refer to the following:

- Schroon, New York, a town in New York
  - Schroon Lake (hamlet), New York, hamlet within the town
- Schroon Lake (New York lake), a lake in New York
