= Jack Wyrtzen =

American evangelist

Casper John "Jack" von Wyrtzen
- Born: Casper John von Wyrtzen; April 22, 1913; United States
- Died: April 17, 1996 (aged 82)

Casper John "Jack" Wyrtzen (April 22, 1913 – April 17, 1996) was an American youth evangelist and founder of Word of Life ministries, which operates Christian camps, conference centers and Bible institutes.

Wyrtzen produced the Word of Life radio program, heard by a nationwide audience. He led the organization for fifty years until his retirement in 1991. Wyrtzen spoke in many churches and venues, holding meetings from the streets to stadiums; he is credited with influencing Billy Graham, George Verwer and other evangelistic leaders.

== Early years and education ==
Wyrtzen was born in the Woodhaven, Queens, section of New York City on April 22, 1913. His father was a foreman in a glass factory, and his mother was involved in Republican politics. Wyrtzen had two brothers.

From 1929 to 1933, he led a dance band at night, playing the trombone, and worked as an insurance salesman during the day until 1940. From 1938 to 1940, Wyrtzen attended Hawthorne Evening Bible School, in Hawthorne, New Jersey, but did not graduate. In 1943, Wyrtzen received an honorary degree from the same school. In 1933, he helped to form XBA, Chi Beta Alpha (Christians Born Again), a Bible study and fellowship group for young men; Phi Gamma was organized for women. He worked with XBA until 1940.

== Ministries ==
In 1940, he founded the Word of Life Fellowship Bible Conference. In 1941, he founded the Word of Life Camp Ministry and in 1946 he purchased an island on Schroon Lake, New York and opened a Word of Life Camp in 1947. Then he opened camps, conference centers, bible institutes, and church youth ministries in other countries.

=== Radio and television ===
Strongly influenced by another youth evangelist, Percy Crawford, Wyrtzen took to the air over WBBC as a preacher and then began the Word of Life broadcast over WHN in 1941. From the 1950s–1980s, Wyrtzen's daily Word of Life radio broadcast was heard nationwide, featuring Christian music, testimonies by young people, and his sermons, many recorded at the Schroon Lake camp. A scaled-back version of the broadcast continued for several years after Wyrtzen's death, hosted by George Theis, Wyrtzen's successor as leader of Word of Life.

=== Word of Life Fellowship ===
Wyrtzen began holding youth rallies in 1940 in New York City, the beginning of the Youth for Christ movement. He founded the Word of Life Fellowship Bible Conference and became director of Word of Life Ministries, serving until 1991. In 1942, he founded the Word of Life Camp Ministry and in 1946 he purchased an island on Schroon Lake, New York, for the Word of Life Camp, and then opened more camps in other cities in the U.S. and other countries. Wyrtzen crisscrossed America holding evangelistic crusades in major cities as well as in country churches. He is credited with developing Bible clubs in over 1,000 churches and starting youth ministries in over 70 countries.

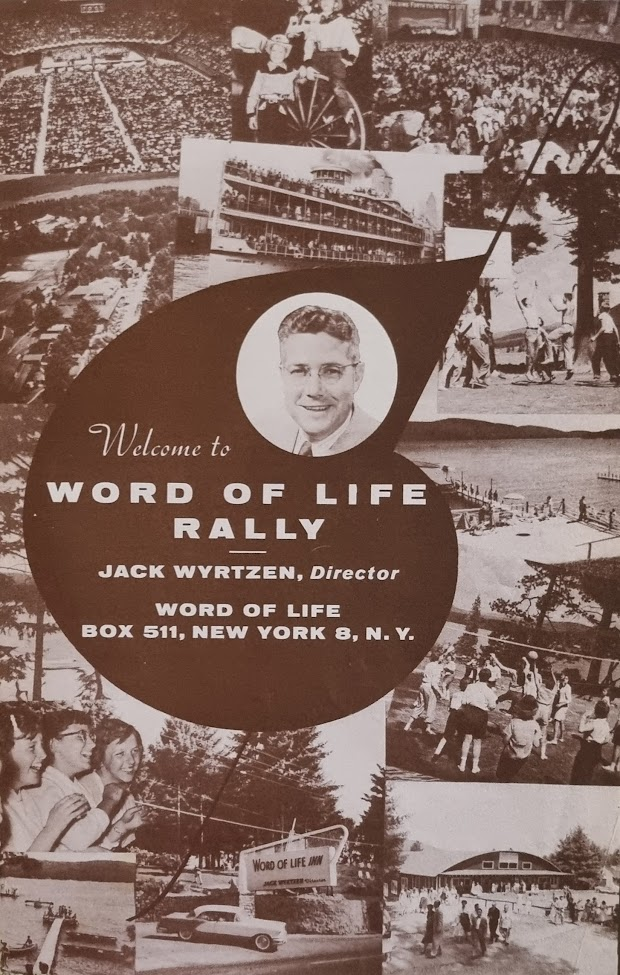
Cover of Rally Flier 1955

The Word of Life ministry developed conference centers at Schroon Lake and, in the 1980s, in Hudson, Florida. Wyrtzen also developed overseas ministries and established Bible clubs for young people. In 1971, he started a Bible institute with co-director Harry Bollback.

== Personal life and legacy ==
Wyrtzen married Margaret Smith on April 18, 1936. Two years after Margaret's death in 1984, he married Joan Steiner on May 6, 1986.

Wyrtzen spoke in many churches and venues, holding meetings from the streets to stadiums; he is credited with influencing Billy Graham, George Verwer and other evangelistic leaders. He died on April 17, 1996, survived by his second wife Joan and five children from his first marriage. One of his daughters, Betsy, has since died, but she is survived by her siblings Mary-Ann Cox (married to Word of Life missionary Dave Cox Sr.); pianist and composer Don Wyrtzen; pastor Dave Wyrtzen; and Ron Wyrtzen (husband to singer and songwriter Christine Wyrtzen). Currently, Word of Life is directed by Don Lough Jr.

== See also ==
- Youth for Christ
- Word of Life Fellowship
