= Pharaoh Lake Wilderness Area =

Conservation area in New York, USA

- IUCN category Ib (wilderness area)
- Location within the United States
- Location: Adirondack Park New York USA
- Nearest city: Ticonderoga, NY
- Coordinates: 43°48′39″N 73°39′55″W
- Area: 46,283 acres (18,730 ha)
- Governing body: New York State Department of Environmental Conservation

The Pharaoh Lake Wilderness Area, an Adirondack Park unit of New York's Forest Preserve, straddles the Essex County-Warren County line in the towns of Ticonderoga, Hague, Horicon and Schroon. The county road along the east shore of Schroon Lake forms the western boundary; to the north, private land and NY 74 form the boundary. The state land boundary forms most of the remaining perimeter except for a stretch of NY 8 on the south.

The area contains 39 bodies of water covering 1,100 acres (4.4 km^{2}), 62.8 miles (101 km) of foot trails, and 14 lean-tos.

== Geography ==
Pharaoh Mountain is the only mountain of much size, although the smaller hills have very steep sides and cliffs, presenting more of an impression of relief than actually exists.

=== Forest ===
Fires have burned over most of the region in the past. As a result of this and the dry sites, much of the tree growth is coniferous with some white birch mixed in. The white pine-white birch type along the shores of several of the lakes and ponds adds immeasurably to their attractiveness. Stands of some of quality Adirondack hardwoods exist in the covelike pockets of the unburned area in the northeast.

=== Water ===
Pharaoh Lake, which gives the unit its name, is one of the largest lakes in the Adirondack Park that lies totally within the Forest Preserve.

== Recreation ==
The area is a popular destination for hiking and backpacking because of its proximity to the Adirondack Northway. Its lean-tos and camp sites provide ample space to camp along its 70 miles of foot trails.

== See also ==
- List of Wilderness Areas in the Adirondack Park
- Pharaoh Mountain
- Spectacle Pond (Schroon, New York)
