= Spectacle Pond (Schroon, New York) =

Pond in New York, United States

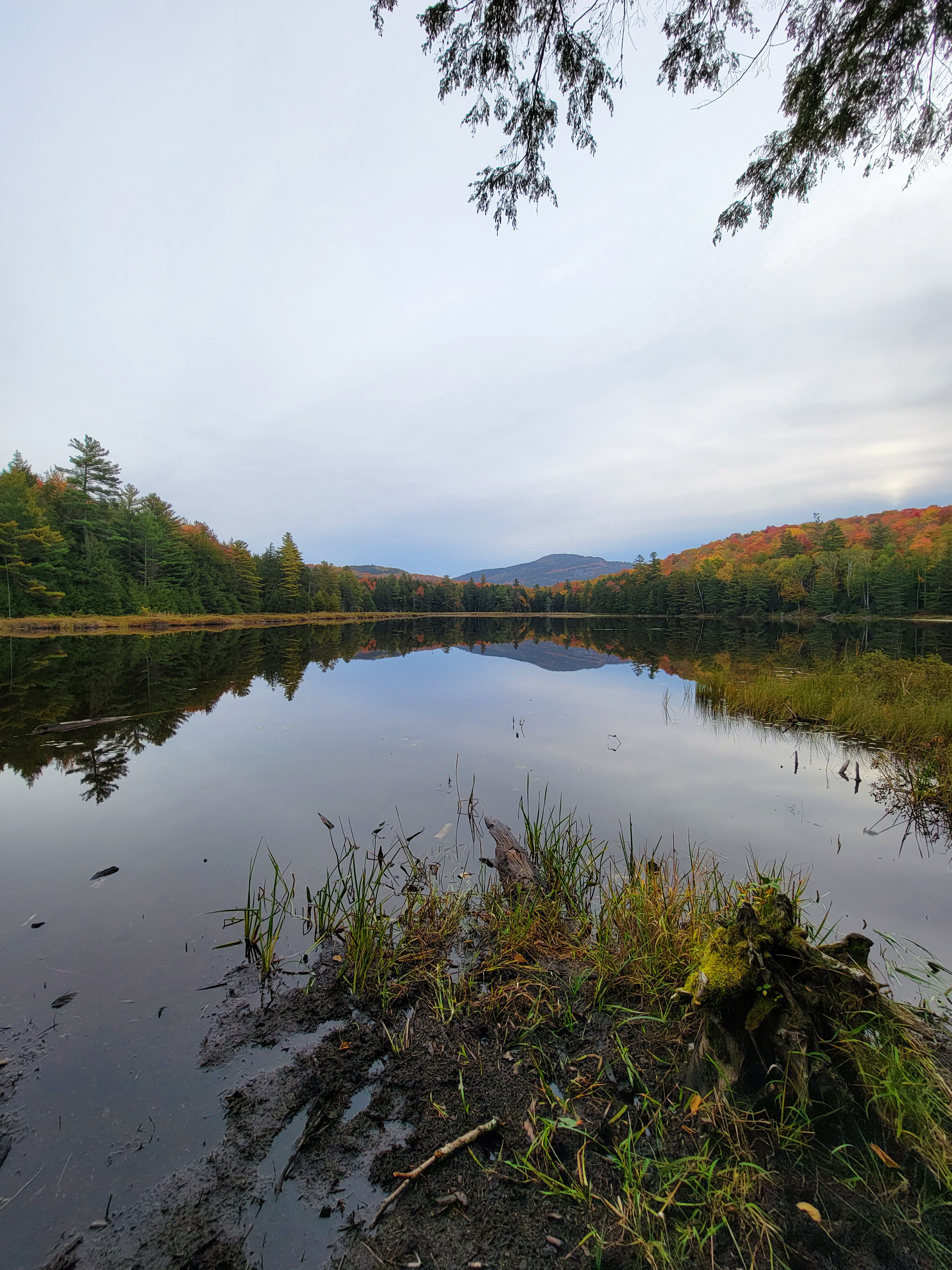
- Spectacle Pond on 10 October 2021

- Location within New York Location within the United States
- Location: Essex County, New York
- Coordinates: 43.8123747°N 73.7016875°W
- Type: pond
- Basin countries: United States
- Surface area: 25 acres (10 ha)
- Surface elevation: 1,158 feet (353 m)

Spectacle Pond is a 33-acre (13 ha) pond in the Pharaoh Lake Wilderness Area of New York State. A 1.7 mi (2.7 km) trail leads to the south shore of Spectacle Pond from Spectacle Pond Trailhead (43.8223°N 73.7267°W) located off of Adirondack Road in Schroon, NY. Pharaoh Mountain can be clearly viewed to the east of the lake.

The waterbody contains brown bullhead and brown trout.
