= Word of Life Fellowship =

International Christian ministry based in the United States

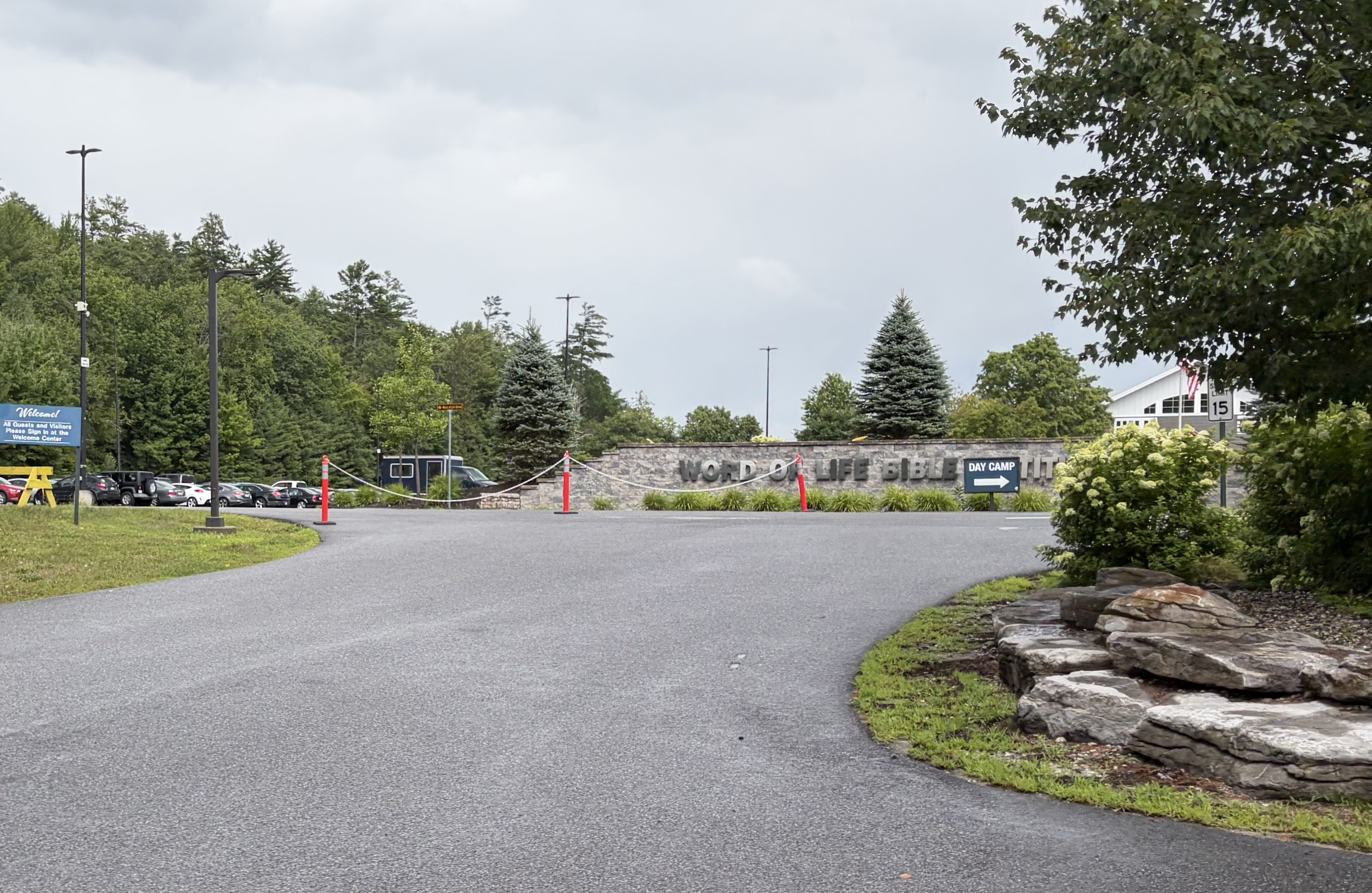
The entrance to the Word of Life Bible Institute in Pottersville, New York

Word of Life Fellowship is an international evangelistic Christian ministry. The headquarters is in Schroon Lake, New York, in the United States.

== History ==
In 1940, Word of Life Fellowship Bible Conference was founded by Jack Wyrtzen. In 1941, he founded the Word of Life Camp Ministry, and in 1946 he purchased an island on Schroon Lake, New York, and opened Word of Life Camp in 1947. By 2021, the ministry had camps, conference centers, Bible institutes, and church youth ministries in over 70 countries.

== Beliefs ==
According to their statement of faith, Word of Life adheres to the teachings of biblical inerrancy, scriptural authority, the Deity of Christ, the bodily Resurrection of Christ, the triunity of God, the total depravity of man, and salvation by grace through faith alone. Word of Life also adheres largely to dispensational theology.

== Notable people ==
People who were employees of Word of Life, alumni of the Bible Institute, or otherwise closely associated with Word of Life Fellowship include:

- Sergio Cariello (born 1964), graduate of the Word of Life Bible Institute and illustrator of The Action Bible
- Jon and Andrew Erwin, graduates of the Word of Life Bible Institute and filmmakers most known for their 2018 film I Can Only Imagine
- J. D. Greear (born 1973), author and pastor of The Summit Church
- Benjamin Laird, Associate Professor of Biblical Studies in the Rawlings School of Divinity at Liberty University, and author
- Brandon "Scoop B" Robinson, sports journalist
- Charles C. Ryrie (1925–2016), biblical scholar, Christian theologian, author and professor
- Jack Wyrtzen (1913–1996), founder of Word of Life, youth evangelist
