= Henry Franklin Bronson =

Canadian businessman (1817-1889)

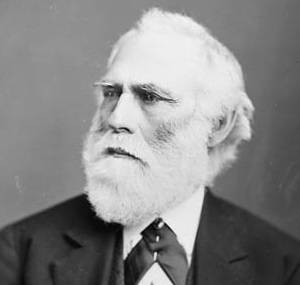
- Henry Franklin Bronson; Source: Library and Archives Canada
- Born: February 24, 1817; Moreau Township, Saratoga County, New York, United States
- Died: December 7, 1889 (aged 72); Ottawa, Ontario, Canada
- Education: Poultney Academy
- Occupation: lumber businessman
- Spouse: Editha Eliza Pierce
- Children: 4
- Family: Erskine Henry Bronson, son; Frederic Erskine Bronson (grandson)

Henry Franklin Bronson (February 24, 1817 – December 7, 1889) was an American-Canadian lumber baron known as one of Ottawa's early entrepreneurs, establishing a large lumber mill at Chaudière Falls on the Ottawa River. Bronson's efforts helped to convert a fledgling small town into a prosperous city.

== Early life ==
Bronson was born in Moreau Township, Saratoga County, New York on 24 February 1817 to parents Sarah Tinker and Alvah Bronson who were of Scottish and Welsh heritage. He had two brothers and one sister.

He studied at Poultney Academy in Vermont and studied agricultural science and rudimentary forestry.

== Later career ==
Bronson was hired as a clerk in John J. Harris' lumber business; he became a junior partner in 1840.

Bronson managed their company's lumber mill on Pharaoh Lake.

Harris, a friend of Bronson's, had land in northern New York state, and mills on the upper Hudson River lakes. He had been impressed by Bronson's "integrity, resolute will, sound constitution and capacity for hard work".

In search of new sources of timber, Bronson visited the Ottawa Valley in the summer of 1848. With Bytown's Chaudière Falls as a potential source for power, and the large amount of timber in the area, he decided "on the spot" that the islands located there would be a good location for a sawmill.

Bronson and Harris went to Bytown in 1852, and after urging the superintendent of the Ottawa River Works, Horace Merrill, to recommend that crown-owned "hydraulic lots" at Chaudière be offered to entrepreneurs, the lots became available in September. They bought some land on nearby Victoria Island's north side, paying $200.20 to the Province of Canada, and with it came the right to use the water as an energy source and "to build a flume to propel their mills and carry saw logs to the property for 21 years." They were soon able to acquire nearby building lots that had been "made available at greatly reduced prices, thanks to a recommendation made to the Canadian government by Ottawa mayor R. W. Scott."

The mill was set up at the Chaudière Falls on the Ottawa River and they acquired timber limits on the Gatineau, Dumoine and Madawaska Rivers. The Harris, Bronson and Coleman (later Harris and Bronson) company mainly supplied markets in the northeastern United States. The large plant had "novel iron gates", 74 upright and four circular saws. The Harris and Bronson Company was set up in the 1850s.

Bronson's pioneering entrepreneurship preceded many other notables, who also came from the United States, namely Perley and Pattee [Chaudière Falls mill], as well as Eddy, and Canada's largest sawmill builder, John Rudolphus Booth.

Bronson settled at Bytown in 1853. When John J. Harris retired in 1866, Abijah Weston and Bronson's son Erskine Henry joined the firm. Abijah Weston was the son of James Douglas Weston, the business partner John J. Harris.

In 1867, the company became known as the Bronsons and Weston Lumber Company. The company operated wholesale outlets in Albany, New York, Boston and Burlington, Vermont, acquired cutting rights to redwood forests in California and established their own bank.

When the Reciprocity Treaty with the United States ended in 1866, Bronson lobbied for reinstating the treaty; he became a supporter of the Liberal Party federally and provincially. The Province of Canada treaty with the US was significant for Bronson because it "permitted Canadian planks and boards to enter that country duty-free".

With William Goodhue Perley and James Skead, Bronson was also a promoter of the Upper Ottawa Steamship Company.

In 1869 he founded the Ottawa Ladies' College in association with the Presbyterian Church. The college was later sold to the first President H.M Tory and Vice President M.M. MacOdrum of Carleton College in 1942. Carleton College has since become Carleton University.

Bronsons and Weston Lumber Company was incorporated, 1888, under c. 103, and its name was changed to "Bronson Company", 1899, c. 96.

== Family life ==
Henry Franklin Bronson married Editha Eliza Pierce on 5 November 1840 and they had a daughter, Gertrude, and three sons: Walter Goodman Bronson, Erskine Henry Bronson (born 1844), and Frank Pierce Bronson. Erskine and Gertrude were twins. Gertrude married lumber barren Levi Crannell.

== Death and legacy ==
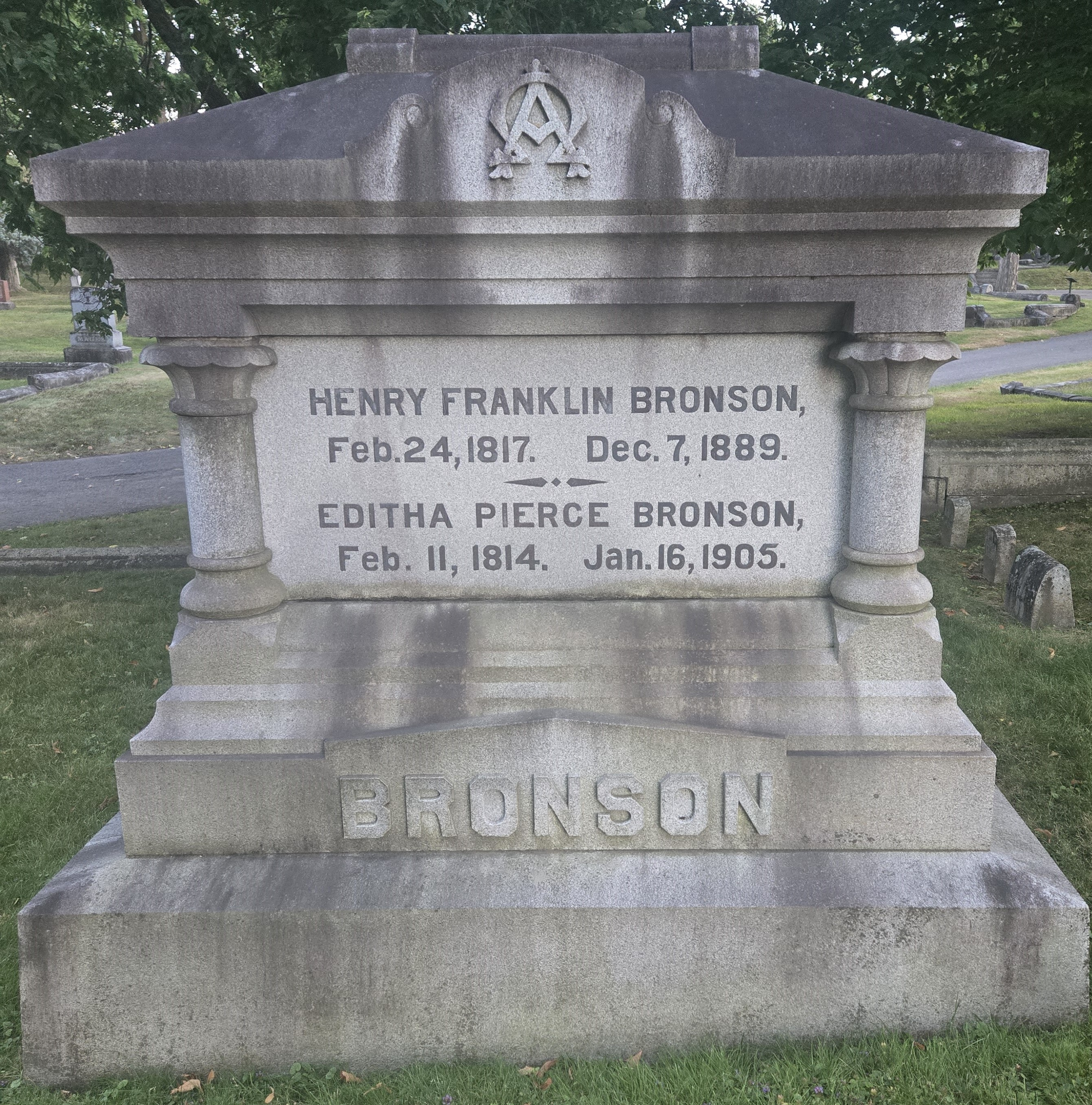
Bronsons' grave

Bronson died at Ottawa in 1889. Erskine Henry continued to manage the company until 1899 when it became the Bronson Company.

Erskine Henry's son, Frederic Erskine Bronson, took over the family pulp business after Erskine H. Bronson's death.

"Erskine Henry Bronson and Walter Goodman Bronson carried on the family business after the death of their father in 1899, followed by Frederick Erskine Bronson after the death of Walter Goodman Bronson in 1932. In the sixties, Frederic Bronson donated a large portion of the Bronson Company's land holdings to the National Capital Commission. A few years later, the National Capital Commission expropriated the rest of the company."

== See also ==
- Lumber industry on the Ottawa River
