= Pharaoh Mountain =

Mountain in New York, United States

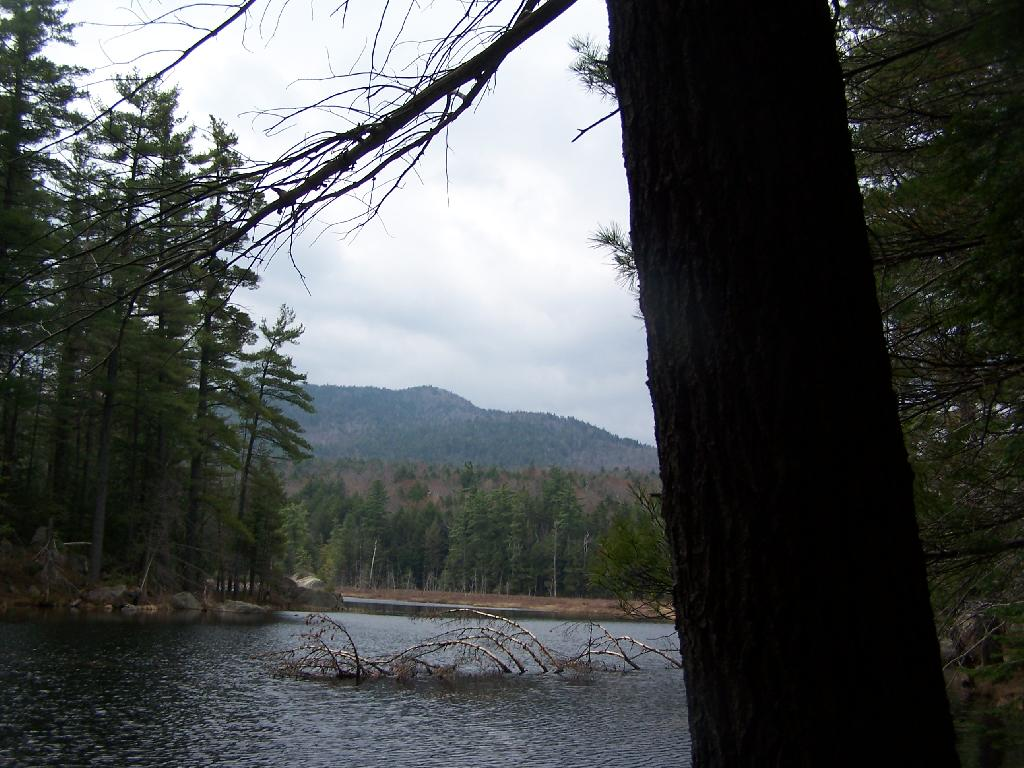
- Pharaoh Mountain from Glidden Marsh

Highest point
- Elevation: 2,546 feet (776 m)
- Coordinates: 43°49′09″N 73°39′27″W

Geography
- Location within New York Adirondack Park Location within the United States
- Location: Essex County, New York, U.S.
- Topo map: USGS Pharaoh Mountain

Pharaoh Mountain is a mountain in the Adirondack Mountains region of New York. It is located south of Paradox in Essex County and is contained within the Pharaoh Lake Wilderness Area. The mountain is the highest in the wilderness area, and is located upon the northwest shore of Pharaoh Lake. In April 1910, a fire observation station was established on the mountain but no tower was needed due to lack of tree cover on the mountain. In 1918, a 35-foot-tall (11 m) Aermotor LS40 tower was built on the mountain. The tower ceased fire watching operations in 1987 and was removed in 1992.

== History ==
In April 1910, a fire observation station was established on the mountain. At the time no tower was needed as views from the mountain were unobstructed due to lack of tree cover. The structure built was a wooden pole frame with a canvas tarp where the observer could get away from the weather. In 1918, the Civilian Conservation Corps erected a 35-foot-tall (11 m) Aermotor LS40 tower. The tower ceased fire watching operations in 1987. In 1992, the tower was removed due to irreparable damage caused by vandals. Also it was removed due to it being a "non-conforming" structure in the Pharaoh Lakes Wilderness Area.
