= Helen Merrill Egerton =

Canadian writer

- "Kaya-tonhs"
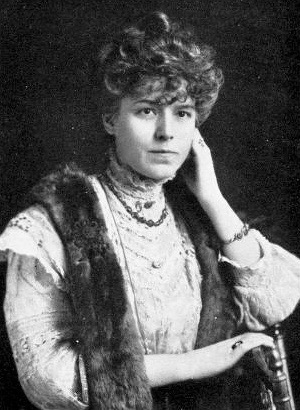
- Born: Helen M. Merrill; 12 November 1866; Napanee, Canada West
- Died: 8 June 1951 (aged 84); Toronto, Canada
- Resting place: Picton, Ontario, Canada
- Education: Ottawa Ladies' College
- Occupations: writer; organizational leader
- Spouse: Frank Egerton (m. 1917; died 1949)
- Parent: Edwards Merrill
- Relatives: Jonathan Edwards; Nathan Hale
- Writing career
- Pen name: H.M.M.
- Language: English
- Genres: poetry; prose; historical articles

Signature
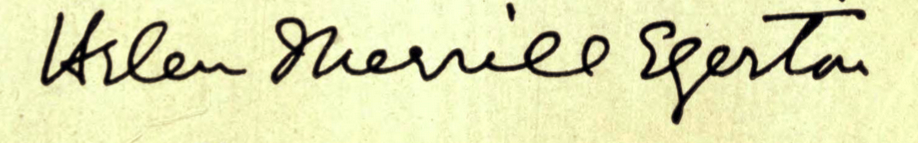

Helen Merrill Egerton (née, Merrill; after marriage, Mrs. Frank Egerton; pen name, H.M.M.; native name, "Kaya-tonhs"; 12 November 1866 – 8 June 1951) was a Canadian writer of poetry and prose, including historical articles. She was also a clubwoman, taking on leadership roles in various organizations. Egerton died in 1951.

== Early life and education ==
Helen M. Merrill was born at Napanee, Canada West, 12 November 1866. She was a daughter of Judge Edwards Merrill of the Prince Edward County (Ontario) Court. There was at least one sibling, a sister, Anne, who was also a writer. Helen was of United Empire Loyalist and French Huguenot ancestry and a kinswoman of Jonathan Edwards and Nathan Hale. Her home, “Morella Villa," at Picton, was set upon a hill overlooking the Bay of Quinte.

She was educated at the Ottawa Ladies' College.

== Career ==
While not a prolific writer, her work in prose and verse was vital and wholesome. Some critics called her a pantheist.

Her interests were divided between literary pursuits and the history of the Province, particularly of the U.E. Loyalists. At the Brock Centenary at Queenston, Egerton, who was secretary of the U.E. Loyalists Association of Canada, under whose auspices the celebration was held, was adopted formally into the Oneida of the Six Nations Indians and given the name of "Kaya-tonhs" (Keeper of records).

Egerton was a member of the executive committee of the U.E. Loyalists, and vice-president of the Toronto Branch of the Canadian Authors Association. She was a member of the Theatre Guild of Toronto, the Chamberlain Association, and the American Society of Colonial Families of Boston. In 1920, she was appointed to organize a society in Canada to join in celebrating the tercentenary of the founding of the New England states.

== Personal life ==
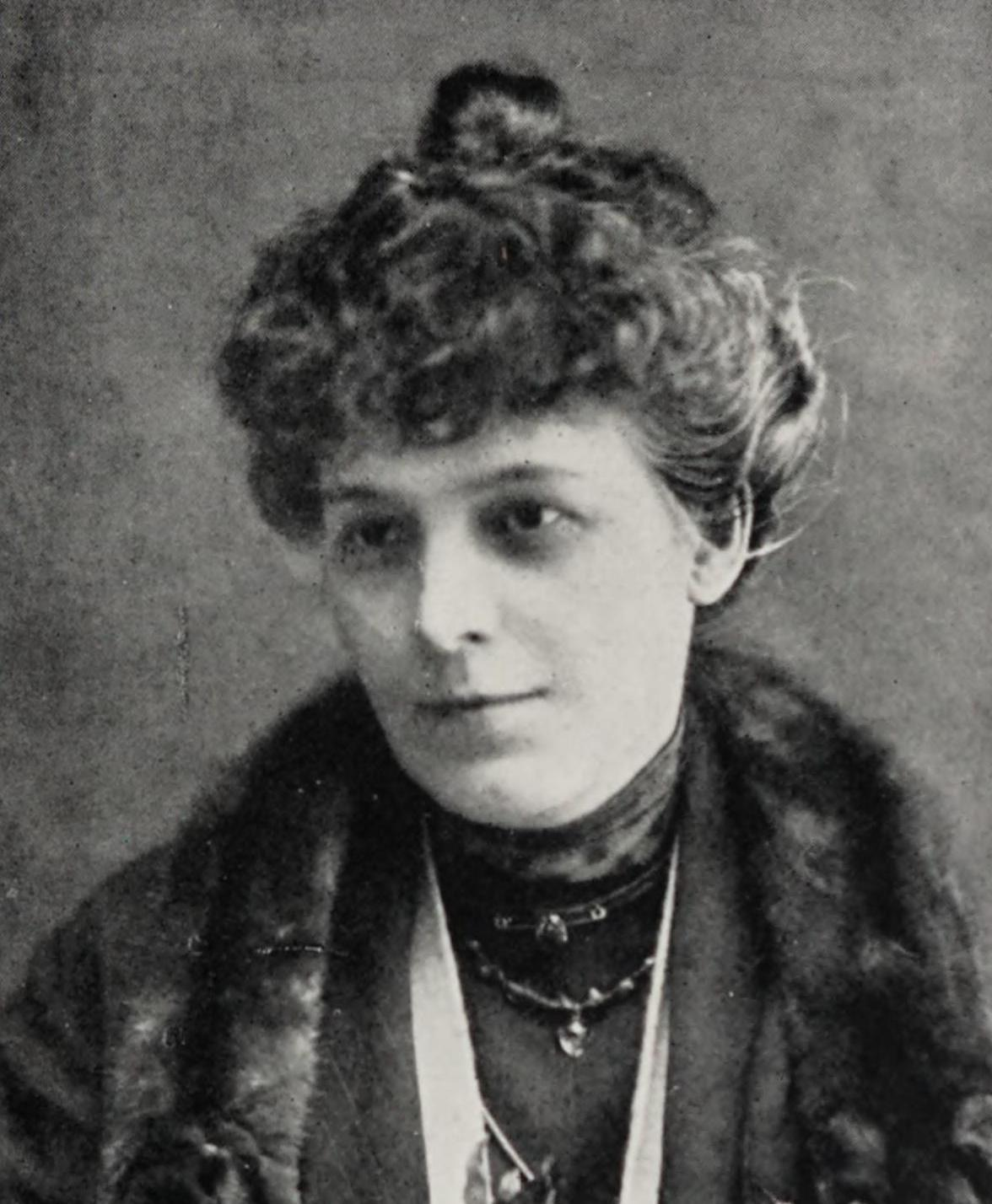
(1916)

In 1917, she married Frank Egerton (d. March 1949), of Maidstone, Kent, England, and resided in Toronto.

She died in Toronto on 8 June 1951. Her burial was at Picton.

== Selected works ==
=== Poetry ===
- "Bluebirds"

=== Articles ===
- "United Empire Loyalist Literature", 1926
