= Poultney Academy =

Defunct Vermont school

Location
- Poultney; Vermont; United States; 43.51806°N 73.23583°W

Information
- Other name: West Poultney Academy
- Religious affiliation: Methodism
- Established: 1834
- Status: defunct

Poultney Academy, sometimes known as West Poultney Academy, was a school in Poultney, Vermont operated by the Methodist movement.

== History ==
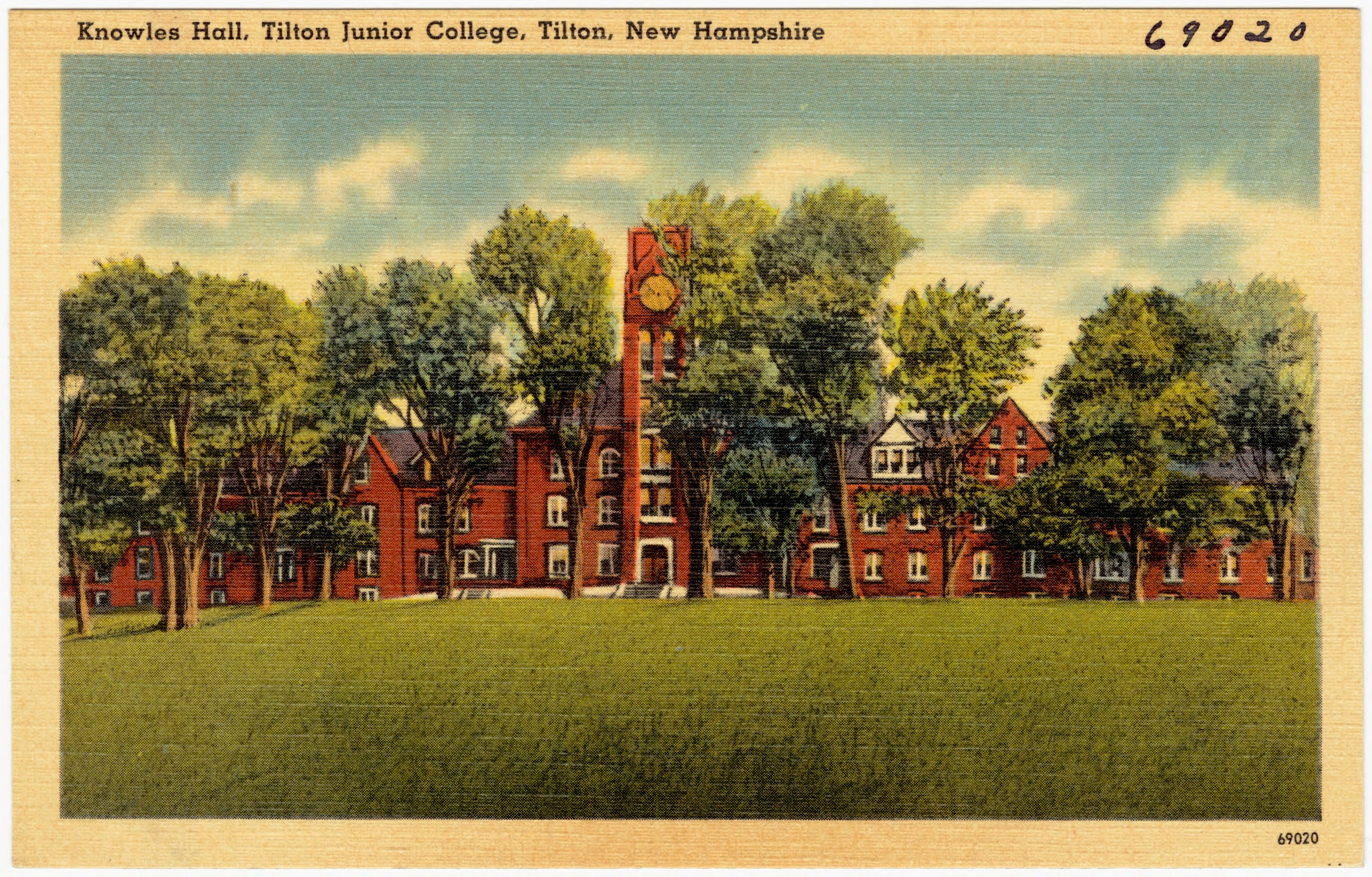
Tilton School, mid 20th century

The school opened in the fall of 1834. The school was supervised by the Troy Conference Academy (now the Green Mountain College) and the Newbury Seminary (now the Vermont College of Fine Arts) under the New Hampshire Conference Seminary (now the Tilton School).

Frederick W. Adams worked at the school.

In 1840, Jesse Truesdell Peck was the principal of both the Poultney Academy and the Gouverneur Wesleyan Seminary.

During the 19th century, the school was suspended before being reopened before becoming privately owned.

== Notable students ==
Notable students include lumber barren Henry Franklin Bronson, surgeon Mary Harris Thompson, and Professor Arthur H. Norton, the principal of the Mexico Academy, New York. Emma Whitlock, wife of Samuel E. Keith attended the school. Millionaire philanthropist and merchant Amherst H. Wilder attended the school.
