= Scaroon Manor =

Campground in New York state

Scaroon Manor is a campground on Schroon Lake in the Adirondack Park. New York State purchased the site, which had been privately run, in 1967. Prior to its development as a campsite, Scaroon Manor was a high class summer resort. The movie Marjorie Morningstar (1958) was filmed on the site.

== History ==
Taylor's-on-Schroon, a hotel owned by Charles F. Taylor, was built on the farmland that would become Scaroon Manor in 1879. The hotel occupied 327 acres (132 ha) and had 8,360 feet (2,550 m) of shoreline. It was popular, growing to have a maximum capacity of 150 people. George C. Gobel purchased the hotel from Taylor's son in 1916. He, in turn, sold it to Joseph Frieber in 1925.

Frieber revitalized the hotel as Scaroon Manor, which he advertised as "an upscale honeymoon alternative to Niagara Falls." In 1950 it employed 275 people and held up to 750 guests. It was owned by Frieber and his wife, who were assisted William Frieber, Joseph's brother. The manor spent $5,000 ($65,346 in 2024) every year on landscaping and had a golf course, handball, basketball, and tennis. They spent around $80,000 ($1,045,533 in 2024) on entertainment, which included musicals and well known singers and performers, such as Harry Hershfield, Morty Gunty, Joey Bishop, Sophie Tucker, Robert Merrill, Alan King, Americo Bono, and Red Skelton. Mosts of the guests came from Manhattan or Brooklyn, but others came from around the Northwestern United States and Canada. The yearly season ended October 1. The movie Marjorie Morningstar (1958) was filmed on the site. Frieber sold his hotel in 1960 to the Brandt Brothers.

In 1967 the New York State government purchased the site and developed it into a campsite. Two years later, the manor was razed.

== Description ==
The site is 5–6 miles (8.0–9.7 km) south of the town of Schroon, New York, off of U.S. Route 9. The 241 acres (98 ha) campsite, which opened in 2011, has 60 campsites and 1,200 feet (370 m) of shoreline.

The manor had an elaborate garden and a 500-seat amphitheatre, and a total of 140 buildings.
