= Frederic Erskine Bronson =

Canadian politician

- Born: 4 December 1886
- Died: 13 April 1953 (aged 66)
- Organization(s): Federal District Commission, Queen's Privy Council for Canada
- Father: Erskine Henry Bronson
- Family: Henry Franklin Bronson (grandather)

Frederic Erskine Bronson, PC (December 4, 1886 – 13 April 1953) was a leading Ottawa businessman and chairman of the Federal District Commission, forerunner of the National Capital Commission, a government body empowered with planning Canada's National Capital Region of Ottawa-Hull and Gatineau. On August 23, 1951, he was sworn into the Queen's Privy Council for Canada in recognition of his public service.

== Early life and education ==
He was born to Erskine Henry Bronson and Ella W. Webster in Ottawa, on December 4, 1886. He had a sister married to R. A. A. Johnson.

Bronson attended local schools and received an engineering diploma from McGill University.

== Career ==
After graduation, in 1909, he worked with his father managing the Bronsons and Weston Lumber Company. As a Liberal politician, he ran against John A. MacDonald for the federal seat of Carlton and lost the election.

He was appointed as member of the Federal District Commission in 1927, and succeeded W. L. Mackenzie King to the lead the organiazation from 1936. In the role, he managed the urban development of Ottawa for 15 years, retiring in 1951.

He was appointed to the Privy Council in 1950.

He was an official at the Ottawa Light, Heat and Power Company. Then the company was merged by the Interprovincial Utilities in 1951, he became a director of the new organization.

== Religion and social life ==
He was a devout member of the St. Andrew's Presbyterian Church and was an elder for 25 years until his death. He was a member of the Rideau Club, the Royal Ottawa Club, the Canadian Club, the Seigniory Club, the Country Club, the Ottawa Boy's Club, and Montreal's University Club.

He was the Joint Chairman of the old Federated Charities, the founder of the Ottawa Community Chest, and a director of the Perley Home and the Victorian Order of Nurses.

== Family and death ==
He married Gertrude Armstrong in 1916. She died in 1934. The couple had daughters: Diana David, the other was married J. R Francis.

In 1945, he married Marjorie (née Davis) Bronson, the widow of Henry Hague Davis. The couple had two daughters Genevieve M (née Bronson) Laidlaw and Margaret M. (née Bronson) Toy, and a son, Frederic E. Bronson Jr.

Bronson was in poor health in 1953 and unexpectedly died of a stroke while on vacation in Atlantic City on 13 April 1953.
