= Erskine Henry Bronson =

Canadian politician (1844-1920)

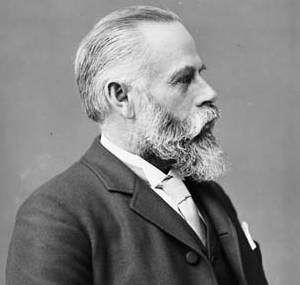
- Erskine Henry Bronson
- Born: September 12, 1844; Bolton, New York, United States
- Died: October 19, 1920 (aged 76); Ottawa, Ontario, Canada
- Education: District Grammar School, Ottawa
- Occupations: businessman, politician
- Spouse: Ella W. Webster (m. 1874)
- Children: Frederic Erskine Bronson, Isabelle Edith (Bronson) Johnson
- Father: Henry Franklin Bronson

Erskine Henry Bronson (September 12, 1844 – October 19, 1920) was an American-born Canadian businessman and political figure.

He represented the riding of Ottawa in the Legislative Assembly of Ontario from 1886 to 1898.

He succeeded his father, Henry Franklin Bronson, to run the Bronsons and Weston Lumber Company.

== Early life and education ==
Bronson was born in Bolton, New York in 1844, the son of Henry Franklin Bronson, and came to Bytown with his family in 1853.

Bronson was educated in Ottawa at the District Grammar School and Sandy Hill in New York City.

== Career ==
He became a partner in the Bronsons and Weston Lumber Company in 1867 and took control of the company when his father died in 1889.

=== Politics and community ===
Bronson served on Ottawa City Council from 1872 to 1877. He was elected in the 1886 Ontario provincial election to represent Ottawa in the Legislative Assembly of Ontario, serving three terms until 1898. From 1890 until his retirement in 1898, he served as a minister without portfolio in the Mowat ministry and in the Hardy ministry.

Bronson was noted as a philanthropist, supporting churches, missions and charities.

=== Insurance industry ===
He was a trustee of Queen University. He was the Treasurer of the Canadian Accident Insurance Company, and the Vice President of the Associated Charities of Ottawa. In 1899, Bronson was a shareholder in the insurance company Canadian Railway Fire Insurance Company, as it changed its name to the Dominion Fire Insurance Company.

=== Lumber and energy industries ===
Bronson was the president of Upper Ottawa Improvement Company, Limited and a director in the Madawaska Improvement Company, founded in 1888 to drive logs down on the Madawaska River. He president of "Bronson Company" and president of the Ottawa Carbide Company.

Bronson was president of the Ottawa Power Company, Limited. This resulted from his efforts to diversify the family business. The power house and power plant at Chaudière Falls which were erected in 1900 following the 1900 Hull–Ottawa fire were owned by this company. Bronson also was responsible for the 1891 construction of Generating Station No. 2 at the falls. In 1891, with lumber baron Gordon B. Pattee, formed the Standard Electric Company. The company merged with others into the Ottawa Electric Company in 1894 and was later absorbed by Ottawa Hydro.

In the 1870s, as president of the Bronson Lumber and Weston Company and the industry's representative on the Ontario Legislature, Bronson successfully argued for the lumber-supplying railway lines to be categorized as colonisation railway. The railway line cut opening in 1896 and through Algonquin Park, linking lumber operations with the Depot Harbour near Parry Sound.

In 1882 the American Forestry Association held a conference in Cincinnati. Attendees agreed to push the government of Quebec to regular forestry, and complimented measured being taken by Bronson to prevent fires and care for forrest. Rules were proposed to limit recreational activities and prospecting in forrest. Bronson advocated for government leases being issues to large lumber companies, arguing that they had better forestry management practises. Henry and other lumbermen were critical of railway companies and sugar and oil industries and encouraged greater government control over Canadian lands. Opponents to their arguments accused the lumbermen of creating monopolies and noted Henry's appointment as a government cabinet minister. One of the lumbermen's most successful arguments led to regulations to reduce forest fires. Much of Bronson's efforts to encourage better regulations of forestry were not supported by the lumber industry.

In 1899, the Bronson lumber company did not undertake any lumber production and changed its name to the Bronson Company in 1899. After the company's mills were destroyed in the 1900 Hull–Ottawa fire, Bronson launched pulp companies.

== Family life ==
Erskine H. Bronson married Ella W. Webster at Norfolk, Va., in 1874. Ella was the daughter of Isabella Fish Hobday and Prof. Nathan Burnham Webster, a cousin of the American statesman, Daniel Webster. She was helped establish the National Council of Women of Canada at the request of Ishbel Hamilton-Gordon, Marchioness of Aberdeen and Temair. Ella also assisted in the establishment of the Associated Charities of Ottawa and founded the Ottawa Maternity Hospital 1895.

Erskine H. Bronson and Ella had three sons, including Frederic Erskine Bronson and one daughter, Isabelle Edith Bronson. Two of their sons died in infancy. Frederic Erskine Bronson and Isabelle Edith survived both parents. Frederic Erskine Bronson, took over the family pulp business after Erskine H. Bronson's death.

The Bronsons lived on 72 and 75 Bronson Avenue (then a concession lane), Ottawa.

Their daughter, Isabelle Edith Bronson married Robert Angus Alister Johnson in 1900. Isabelle Edith Johnson lived at 197 Bronson Street.

== Death and legacy ==
Erskine H. Bronson retired from business in 1910. He died at Ottawa in 1920. He is buried in Beechwood Cemetery.

A street in Ottawa, Bronson Avenue is named after him.

Later, 75 Bronson Avenue was later converted into the Bronson Memorial House for Aged Women and later demolished to make way for high density housing and parklands.

== Electoral record ==
1882 Canadian federal election: Carleton, Ontario
Party	Candidate	Votes	%
Liberal–Conservative	John A. Macdonald	1,185	48.75
Independent Conservative	John May	629	25.87
Liberal	Erskine Henry Bronson	617	25.38
Total valid votes		2,431	
Source(s) Library of Parliament – History of Federal Ridings since 1867: Carleton
