= Adirondack Marathon =

Annual marathon in New York, U.S.

- Date: September
- Location: Schroon Lake, New York, United States
- Event type: Road
- Distance: Marathon
- Website: www.adirondackmarathon.org

The Adirondack Marathon is a 26.2-mile (42.2 km) marathon held each September in Schroon Lake, New York. The race follows a road course around the lake. The race motto is "The most beautiful 26 miles 385 yards you will ever run". There were 331 finishers in 2010.

== Course ==
The Adirondack Marathon begins on Main St. in Schroon Lake Village. The course goes north on Rt. 9 to the Alder Meadow Rd where it stays relatively flat for the first three and a half miles; however, between three and a half and six miles (10 km) the course rises almost 300 feet (91 m) to an elevation of 1,100 feet (340 m) above sea level. ]

On the east side of Schroon Lake, the course follows East Shore Drive, a scenic Adirondack Mountain road. The course drops to an elevation of 900 feet (270 m) between miles six and eight, and then steadily climbs again between miles eight and eleven. During this section of the course there are beautiful views of the lake.

The elevation drops as the course enters the village of Adirondack where it remains relatively flat. After rounding the southern tip of the lake, the course rejoins the rolling hills of Rt. 9 in Pottersville, turns north and returns to Schroon Lake Village, ending at the Town Beach on Leland Avenue.

Although there is no official pronouncement of an exact calculation, it is understood that the total course elevation gain is slightly in excess of 1,500 feet, making the marathon near the top end of the difficulty scale based on this parameter.

== History ==
The Adirondack Marathon was first held in 1997. The men's winner was James Garrett in a time of 2:37:21; the women's winner was Simone Stoeppler with a time of 3:04:08 (still a course record). Peter Heimgartner has won the race six times (1998–2000, 2002, 2004, 2006) while the women's race has seen Virginia Rebeuh win a pair of races (1998, 2005). The men's course record was set in 2007 by David Herr in a time of 2:36:55. The handcycle race began in 2000, and the course record was set in 2003 by Chris Klebl in a time of 1:46:50.

In 2005 a man, Ted Gradwell, 58, of Schroon Lake, died running the race. He collapsed on the course near Mountainside Bible Church, and died instantly. People on site administered CPR and aid nearly immediately but he was never revived. He was taken from the course to Glens Falls Hospital, via ambulance waiting on site, and they declared him dead on arrival.
