= Hawthorne Christian Academy =

Private Christian school in Passaic County, New Jersey, United States

Location
- 2000 Route 208; Hawthorne, Passaic County, New Jersey 07506
- 40.976157°N 74.159792°W

Information
- Type: Private Christian
- Established: 1981
- NCES School ID: 02044476
- Head of school: Todd Mitchell
- Faculty: 46.9 FTEs
- Grades: PreK-12
- Enrollment: 498 (plus 37 in PreK, as of 2023–24)
- Student to teacher ratio: 10.6:1
- Colors: Maroon and Gray
- Athletics conference: North Jersey Interscholastic Conference
- Team name: The Defenders
- Accreditation: Middle States Association of Colleges and Schools Commission on Elementary and Secondary Schools
- Tuition: $15,600 (grades 9-12 for 2022-23)
- Website: www.hca.org

Hawthorne Christian Academy (HCA) is a private, co-educational Christian school serving students in preschool through 12th grade. The Academy is run by the Hawthorne Gospel Church, and is located on Route 208 in Hawthorne, in Passaic County, in the U.S. state of New Jersey. The school opened in 1981 and had its first graduating class eight years later.

As of the 2023–24 school year, the school had an enrollment of 498 students (plus 37 in PreK) and 46.9 classroom teachers (on an FTE basis), for a student–teacher ratio of 10.6:1. The student body was 36.9% (184) White, 28.3% (103) Hispanic, 20.7% (103) Asian, 13.1% (65) Black, 0.6% (3) two or more races, 0.2% (1) American Indian / Alaska Native and 0.2% (1) Native Hawaiian / Pacific Islander.

HCA has been accredited by the Middle States Association of Colleges and Schools Commission on Elementary and Secondary Schools since 1996. The school has been accredited by the Association of Christian Schools International since 1981.

== Academics ==
Hawthorne Christian Academy offers a comprehensive academic program for students in preschool through grade 12. The school follows a college-preparatory curriculum that incorporates a Christian worldview across all subject areas. Instruction is organized into three divisions: Lower School (Preschool–Grade 5), Middle School (Grades 6–8), and Upper School (Grades 9–12).

In the Lower School, students receive instruction in foundational subjects such as reading, writing, mathematics, science, and social studies. The curriculum also includes Bible instruction, physical education, art, music, and technology.

The Middle School curriculum builds on elementary education with increased academic expectations in core subjects and opportunities for exploratory learning. In addition to Bible classes, students take courses in language arts, mathematics, science, social studies, and elective subjects.

At the Upper School level, the academy offers a range of college-preparatory courses, including Advanced Placement (AP) classes in subjects such as English Literature, U.S. History, Biology, and Calculus. Honors-level courses are also available. The school meets and exceeds the standard credit requirements for high school graduation in New Jersey, including courses in English, mathematics, science, history, Bible, and world languages. Academic support services are available to students who require additional assistance. The school also provides college and career guidance, including standardized test preparation and assistance with the college application process. Graduates of Hawthorne Christian Academy have been accepted to a range of higher education institutions, including both secular and Christian colleges and universities.

== Community Outreach ==
Hawthorne Christian Academy incorporates community involvement and service activities into its educational program. Students across grade levels participate in a range of service projects, some of which are coordinated through partnerships with local organizations and churches. These activities have included food and clothing drives, support for international relief efforts, and volunteering within the surrounding community.

At the secondary level, students are typically required to complete a set number of community service hours as part of their graduation requirements. The school has also organized domestic and international trips focused on service and cross-cultural engagement, often in connection with Christian missions or humanitarian work.

Hawthorne Christian Academy maintains a strong relationship with Hawthorne Gospel Church. The church and school collaborate on certain events and initiatives, and many school-wide programs, such as chapel services and holiday observances, are held on the church campus.

Parental involvement is supported through a parent-teacher group that facilitates communication and provides assistance with school functions. The academy also hosts events throughout the year that are open to the school community, including concerts, exhibitions, and informational sessions.

== Athletics ==
The Hawthore Christian Academy Defenders participate in the North Jersey Interscholastic Conference, which is comprised of small-enrollment schools in Bergen, Hudson, Morris and Passaic counties, and was created following a reorganization of sports leagues in Northern New Jersey by the New Jersey State Interscholastic Athletic Association (NJSIAA). With 100 students in grades 10-12, the school was classified by the NJSIAA for the 2019–20 school year as Non-Public B for most athletic competition purposes, which included schools with an enrollment of 37 to 366 students in that grade range (equivalent to Group I for public schools).

The school participates as the host school / lead agency in a joint baseball team with Eastern Christian High School. In turn, Eastern Christian is the host school for a joint softball team. These co-op programs operate under agreements scheduled to expire at the end of the 2023–24 school year.
