= Hackensack Gospel Church =

Coordinates: 40.891898°N 74.041958°W

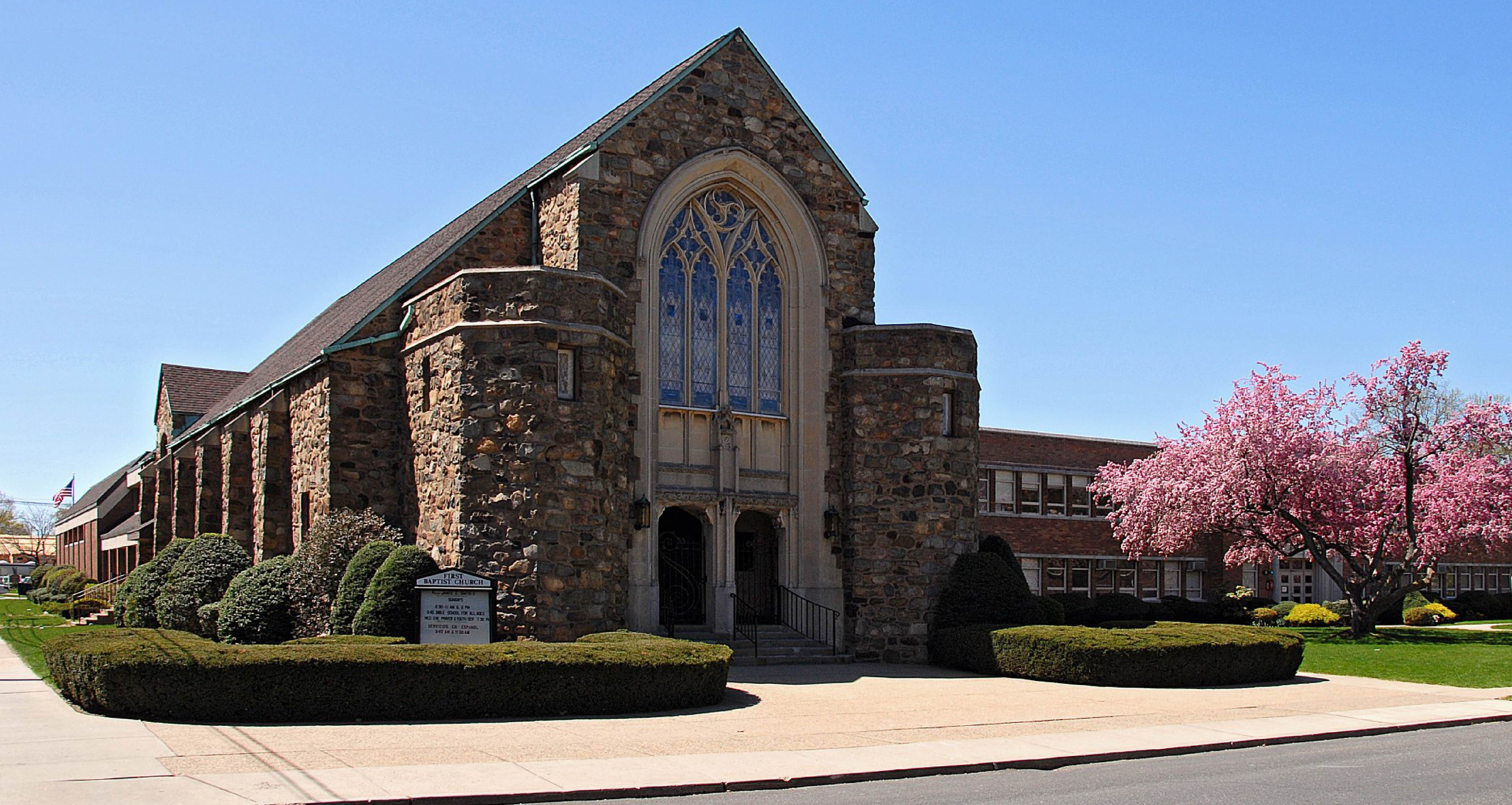
- Hackensack Gospel Church
- Location: 15 Conklin Place; Hackensack, New Jersey 07601
- Country: United States
- Denomination: Baptist
- Website: firstbaptisthackensack.org

History
- Founded: 1870

Architecture
- Architect: Harry E. Warren

Hackensack Gospel Church previously known as the First Baptist Church of Hackensack is a non-denominational church located in Hackensack, New Jersey. It is a campus of the Hawthorne Gospel Church. The campus covers a full city block of land and includes a 500-seat worship auditorium, a school offering pre-kindergarten through grade 12, a day camp, and a library. The church formerly had a bookstore and various other ministry as well. At one point the church had nearly 1,500 members.

== Beliefs and mission ==
The mission of Hackensack Gospel Church is to glorify God by Worshipping with others as a cooperate body of believers, Growing closer to God and other together, and Serving the surrounding communities.

== History ==
The Hackensack Gospel Church was founded as the First Baptist Church was founded on April 7, 1870 when the need for a Baptist church in Hackensack came. In 1916, with 179 members, Dr. Harry C. Leach came to be Senior Pastor. Under his 32 years of leadership, he helped grow the church to 850 members. In 1923, the church constructed the classical church sanctuary. When Dr. Leach retired in 1948, Pastor Joseph M. Stowell came to be the Senior Pastor. He then helped grow the church to nearly 1,400 members. In 1953, the church constructed the Bible School Building, which was able to house 1,000 pupils. Following Pastor Stowell, in 1970, Pastor Robert C. Gage came to be Senior Pastor. Under his leadership, the church began Hackensack Christian Schools, a Pre-K thru 12th grade school. Near the end of his leadership in 1977, the church constructed the Leach Memorial Building, which housed an athletic center, classrooms, and science labs for the Christian School. In 1980, Pastor Gage left to pastor Wealthy Park Baptist Church. In 2017, the school was renamed to Bergen County Christian Academy in order to have a stronger reach into the community. In 2020, the church became a campus ministry of the Hawthorne Gospel Church and officially changed their name to the Hackensack Gospel Church on April 23, 2023.

- Original Chapel constructed, 1880
- Current Sanctuary constructed, 1923
- Annual Missionary Conferences, 1946
- Daily Vacation Bible School (reinstituted 1950)
- Bible School Building constructed, 1953
- Lending Library (1953 in the Bible School Building, previously opened in the former chapel)
- Cornerstone Day Camp
- Bergen County Christian Academy (formerly Hackensack Christian School), 1972
- New Life Island, 1972
- Leach Memorial Building constructed, 1977
- Missionary House & Parsonage Duplex constructed, 1997

== Bergen County Christian Academy ==
Bergen County Christian Academy is located on the church campus and has approximately 150 students enrolled in pre-kindergarten through grade 12.
