= Schroon River =

River in the United States of America

Coordinates: 43°28′50″N 73°48′50″W

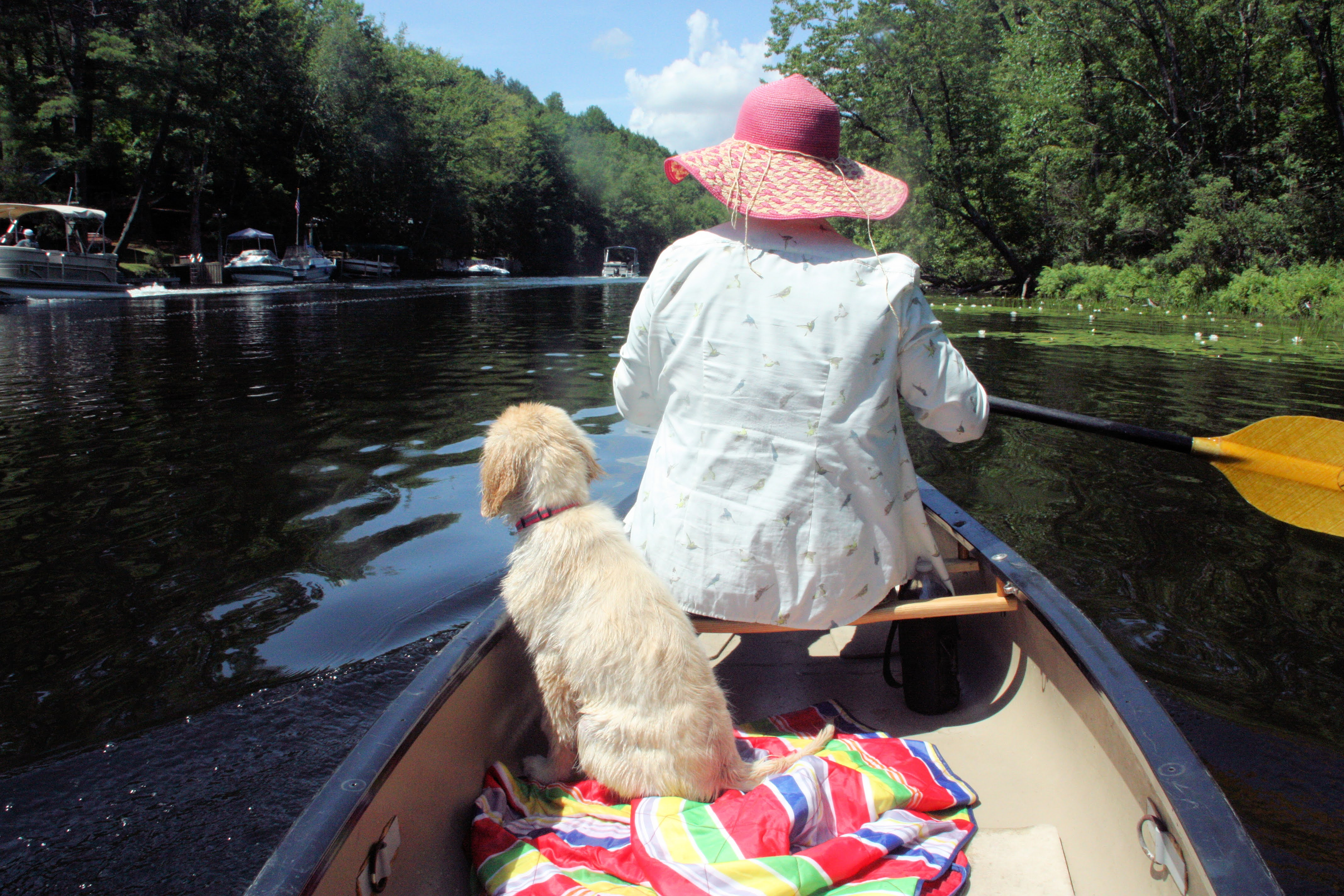
Schroon River at GPS (43.697730, -73.793533)

The Schroon River (/ˈskruːn/ SKROON) is a 67.7-mile-long (109.0 km) tributary of the Hudson River in the southern Adirondack Mountains of New York, beginning at the confluence of Crowfoot Brook and New Pond Brook near Underwood, and terminating at the Hudson in Warrensburg. Its watershed is entirely within the Adirondack Park. The river runs through the towns of North Hudson, Schroon, Chester, Bolton, and Warrensburg.

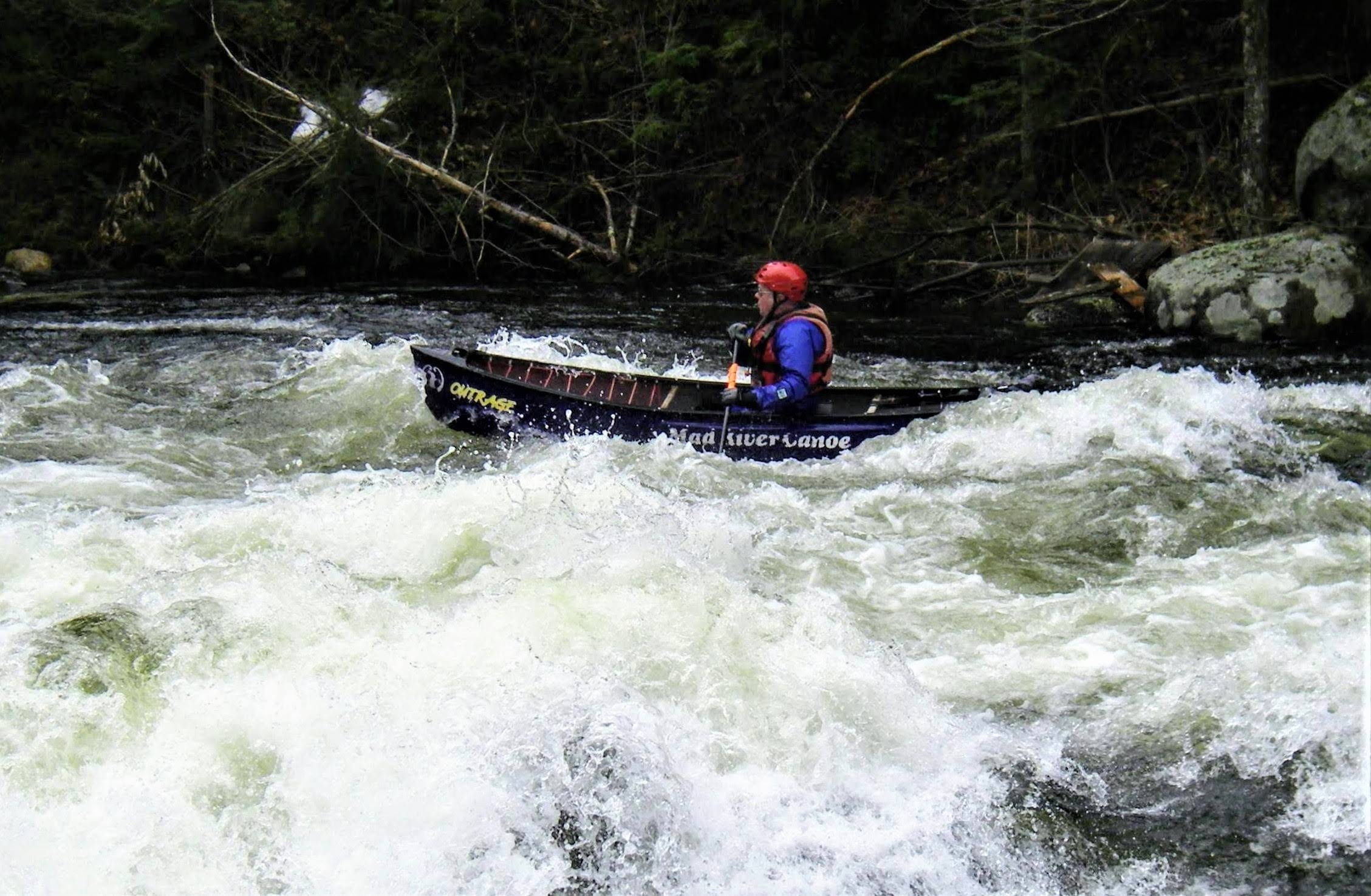
'The Big Drop' on the Schroon River, GPS (43.617471, -73.745444)

Interstate 87, the Adirondack Northway, follows the Schroon River valley from Warrensburg to Underwood. U.S. Route 9 takes a parallel course from Warrensburg to Schroon Lake, then follows the river through Underwood.

== See also ==
- List of rivers in New York
