= Samson Fried Estate =

Historic house in New York, United States

- U.S. National Register of Historic Places
- Location within New York Location within the United States
- Location: NY 74, Severance, New York
- Coordinates: 43°52′32″N 73°42′54″W
- Area: 34.3 acres (13.9 ha)
- Built: 1902
- Architect: Jacobs, Harry Allen
- Architectural style: Shingle Style
- NRHP reference No.: 87000225
- Added to NRHP: February 26, 1987

Samson Fried Estate, also known as "Birch Hill," is a historic estate located at Severance in Essex County, New York. The estate has a Shingle Style main house, built as a summer residence in 1902, and nine contributing outbuildings. The main house is a large, two story rambling, roughly L-shaped frame residence. It features hipped- and shed-roof dormers, four massive stone chimneys, second floor balconies, and a third story widow's walk. There is also a wide verandah around three sides of the house. The contributing buildings and structures include a garage, barn, hen house, tennis court, guest cottage, ice house, and well.

It was listed on the National Register of Historic Places in 1987.
