= Talichito =

Historic house in New York, United States

- U.S. National Register of Historic Places
- Location within New York Location within the United States
- Location: Nesa Rd., Schroon Lake, New York
- Coordinates: 43°50′06″N 73°44′34″W
- Area: 13.39 acres (5.42 ha)
- Built: 1917-1920, c. 1945
- Architectural style: Rustic / Adirondack Style
- NRHP reference No.: 12000533
- Added to NRHP: August 22, 2012

Talichito, also known as Camp Tali Chito, is a historic Adirondack seasonal camp located at Schroon Lake, Essex County, New York. The property was developed between 1917 and 1920, and includes an Adirondack style log and frame cabin, a small pump house, boathouse, and shed with icehouse. The cabin is a 1 1/2-story, "T"-plan structure consisting of a gable front main section with smaller gabled wings. It features a front verandah measuring 52 feet wide and 46 feet deep. It was developed by Paulding F. Sellers (1876-1950), a vice president of the Buffalo General Electric Company.

It was built on a bare granite outcrop formerly known at The Watch Rock and the name "Talichito" is taken from the Choctaw word that means "a large stone."

It was added to the National Register of Historic Places in 2012.
