= Bergen County Christian Academy =

Christian school in Bergen County, New Jersey, United States

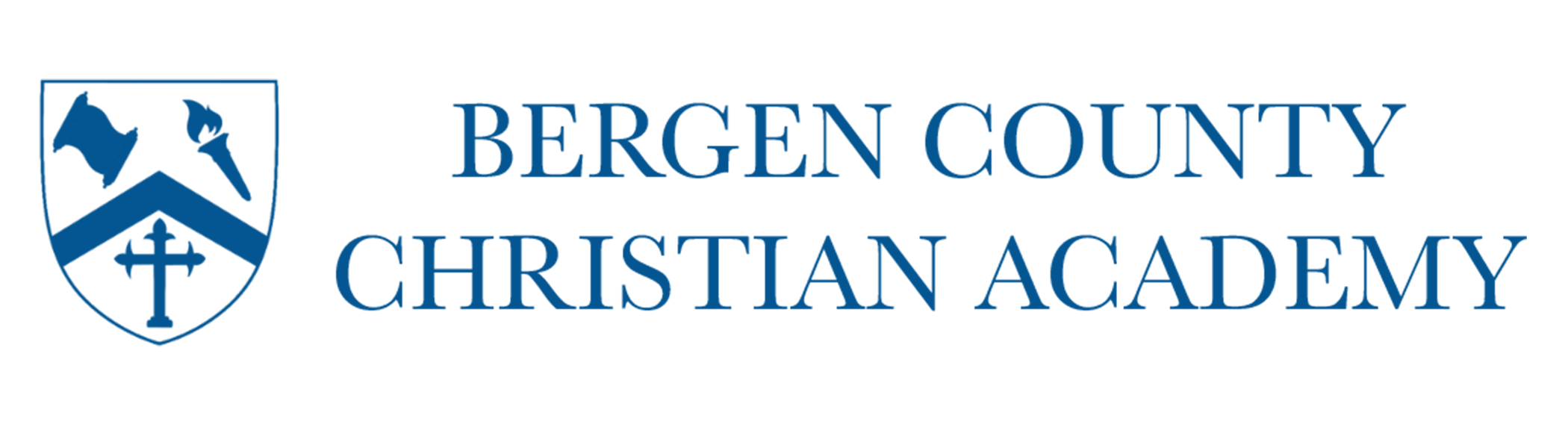

Location
- 15 Conklin Place; Hackensack, Bergen County, New Jersey 07601; 40.892203°N 74.042258°W

Information
- Type: Private school
- Motto: Becoming Confident Christian Ambassadors
- Established: 1973
- NCES School ID: 00868597
- Principal: Linda Horn
- Faculty: 18 FTEs
- Grades: PreK-8th
- Enrollment: 101 (plus 19 in PreK, as of 2019–20)
- Student to teacher ratio: 5.6:1
- Colors: Royal Blue and White
- Nickname: Crusaders
- Tuition: $9,500 (grades 6-12)
- Website: bergenchristian.org

Bergen County Christian Academy (BCCA) is a private Christian school located in Hackensack, Bergen County, New Jersey, United States. Bergen County Christian Academy was founded in 1973 as Hackensack Christian Schools, a ministry of First Baptist Church of Hackensack. Hackensack Christian was reestablished as Bergen County Christian Academy in 2016. The Academy is a member of the American Association of Christian Schools (AACS), Garden State Association of Christian Schools (GSACS) and Metro Christian Athletic Association (MCAA). Bergen County Christian Academy also accepts international students through the Student and Exchange Visitor Program (SEVP and I-20)
