= Rideau Club =

Private social club in Ontario, Canada

Coordinates: 45.42023°N 75.70023°W

- Formation: 18 September 1865; 160 years ago
- Type: Private club
- Headquarters: 15th Floor, 99 Bank Street
- Website: rideauclub.ca

The Rideau Club is a private social club in Ottawa, Ontario. The club was founded in 1865 by Sir John A. Macdonald and Sir George-Étienne Cartier as a gentlemen's club, but since 1979 has been mixed-sex. For much of its history the club was populated primarily by parliamentarians. In 1876 the Rideau built its clubhouse at 84 Wellington Street, where it remained until the building burned down in 1979. Since the fire, the club has been located in the top floor of the Metropolitan Life Building at 99 Bank Street.

== History ==
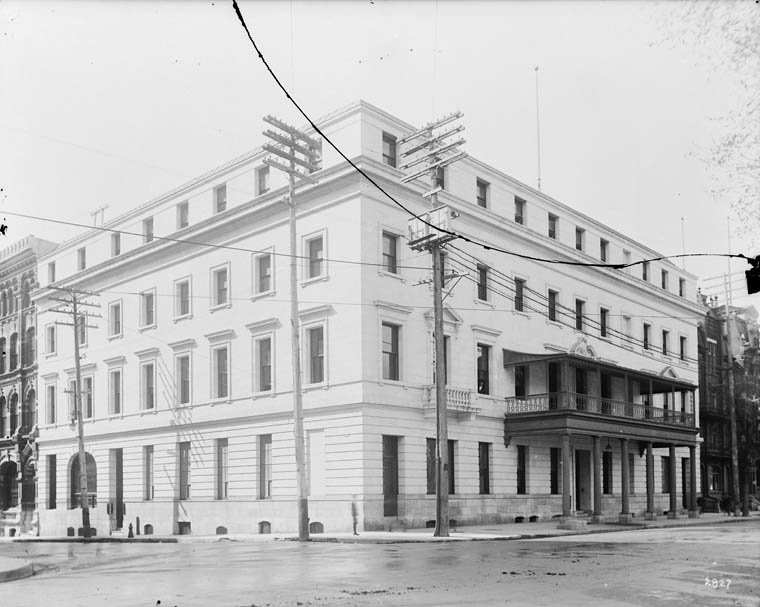
The clubhouse at 84 Wellington

The club building, located for years across the street from the Parliament Buildings, burned down in October 1979. The club is now located on the top floor of a downtown office tower on Bank Street. At the time of the fire, the Government of Canada was attempting to expropriate the club's property to serve as part of a future U.S. embassy.

It was reported to be the first club in Canada (and one of the first in North America) to disallow the use of the blackball tradition which allowed clubs to subtly discriminate against Jewish potential members, after succumbing to pressure from Prime Minister Lester B. Pearson, among others, to admit Louis Rasminsky, Governor of the Bank of Canada.

Similarly, in the 1970s, after seeing controversy over its all-male policy, the club allowed female members and at the same time removed restrictions on female guests. The lounge, located on the north side of the club, is named after its first female member, Jean Pigott. She was accepted to the Rideau Club in 1979, the same year as the fire.

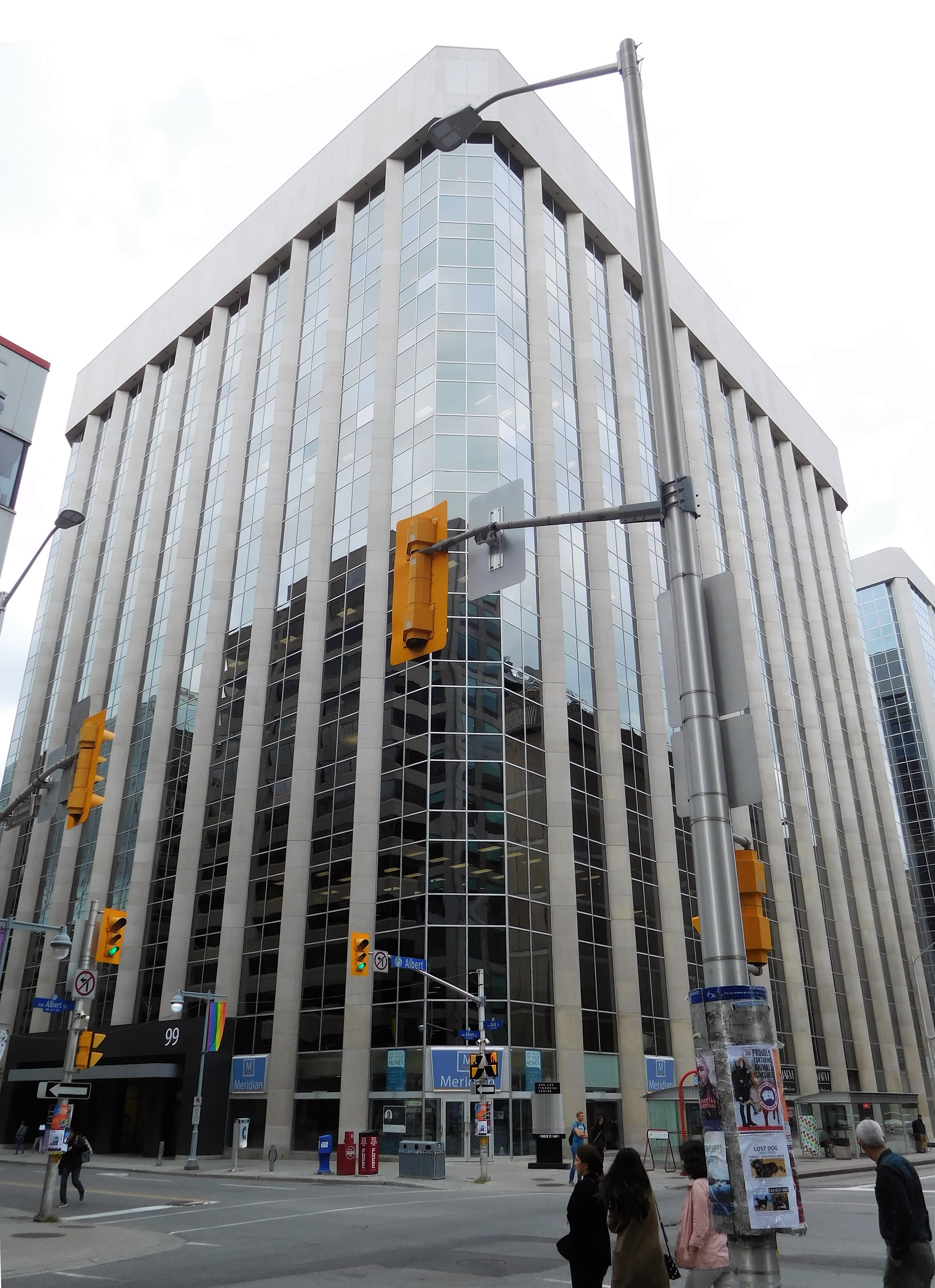
Since 1980, the club has been housed on the top floor of 99 Bank Street

Each room on the south side of the club is dedicated to a significant person in Canadian history. Most are named after former prime ministers of Canada, but one is named after Yousuf Karsh. It is filled with famous portraits taken by him and left to the Rideau Club after his death.

== Presidents ==
- 1865-66 – Sir John A. Macdonald
- 1867-68 – Lt Col Hewitt Bernard
- 1869 – George William Allan
- 1870-71 – Sir Richard John Cartwright
- 1872 – Sir Alexander Tilloch Galt
- 1873-78 – Joseph Merrill Currier
- 1879 – Alonzo Wright
- 1880 – James Cockburn
- 1881 – Thomas Coltrin Keefer
- 1882-83 – William Alexander Henry
- 1884-85 – John Sweetland
- 1886 – Francis Clemow
- 1887 – John Alexander Gemmill
- 1888-90 – John Sweetland
- 1891-92 – Helier Vavasour Noel
- 1893 – Col Walker Powell
- 1894-95 – Charles Magee
- 1896-97 – Sir George Halsey Perley
- 1898-99 – John Christie
- 1900-01 – Col De la Cherois T. Irwin
- 1902-03 – C. Berkeley Powell
- 1904-05 – Dr Frederick Montizambert
- 1906-07 – F. W. Avery
- 1908-10 – Travers John Lewis
- 1911-13 – David M. Finnie
- 1914-22 – Robert Gill
- 1923-24 – Sir Robert Borden
- 1925-29 – J. A. Jackson
- 1930-31 – Col Cameron MacPherson Edwards
- 1932-34 – Hamnett Pinhey Hill
- 1935-36 – Charles G. Cowan
- 1937-38 – Col Henry Campbell Osborne
- 1939-41 – Oliver Mowat Biggar
- 1942-45 – Frederic Erskine Bronson
- 1946 – Kenneth A. Greene
- 1947-48 – Duncan Kenneth MacTavish
- 1949-50 – John A. Aylen
- 1951-52 – Barry German
- 1953-54 – James Duncan Hyndman
- 1955-56 – Chalmers Jack Mackenzie
- 1957-59 – Ascanio-J. Major
- 1960-62 – Vice Adm Harold Taylor Wood Grant
- 1962-63 – Douglas Abbott
- 1964-65 – Rear Adm Wallace Bourchier Creery
- 1965-67 – Charles C. Gale
- 1967 – Adam Hartley Zimmerman
- 1968-69 – Douglas Abbott
- 1969-70 – A. Davidson Dunton
- 1970-72 – Lester B. Pearson
- 1972-73 – Cuthbert Scott
- 1974-75 – Ernest D. Lafferty
- 1976-77 – Stewart F. M. Wotherspoon
- 1978-89 – James Ross
- 1980-81 – Guy Roberge
- 1982-83 – Denis Coolican
- 1984-85 – Angus C. Morrison
- 1986 – Air Marshal Hugh Lester Campbell
- 1987-88 – William Hector McMillan
- 1989-90 – Hon John J. Urie
- 1991-92 – Michael L. Phelan
- 1993-94 – Anthony M. P. Tattersfield
- 1995-96 – M. Patrick Gillin
- 1997-98 – John M. Scott
- 1999-2000 – Maj Gen Ernest B. Creber
- 2001-02 – Michael Baylin
- 2003-04 – Robert J. Buchan
- 2005-07 – Meriel V. M. Beament Bradford
- 2007-09 – Paul Labbé
- 2009-11 – Peter B. M. Hyde
- 2011-13 – Nik Nanos
- 2013-15 – Norman Sabourin
- 2015-17 – Josephine A. L. Palumbo
- 2017-19 – J. Paul Hession
- 2019-21 – Suzanne Corbeil
- 2021-22 – Janet Thorsteinson
- 2022 – Jane Brydges

== Club histories ==
- Little, Charles. The Rideau Club, a Short History: The First Hundred Years, 1895–1965. Rideau Club, 1965.
- Lynch, Charles. Up from the Ashes: The Rideau Club Story. University of Ottawa Press, 1990.
- McCreery, Christopher. Savoir Faire, Savoir Vivre: Rideau Club 1865–2015. Dundurn Press, 2015.

== See also ==
- List of gentlemen's clubs in Canada
