= Schroon, New York =

- Town
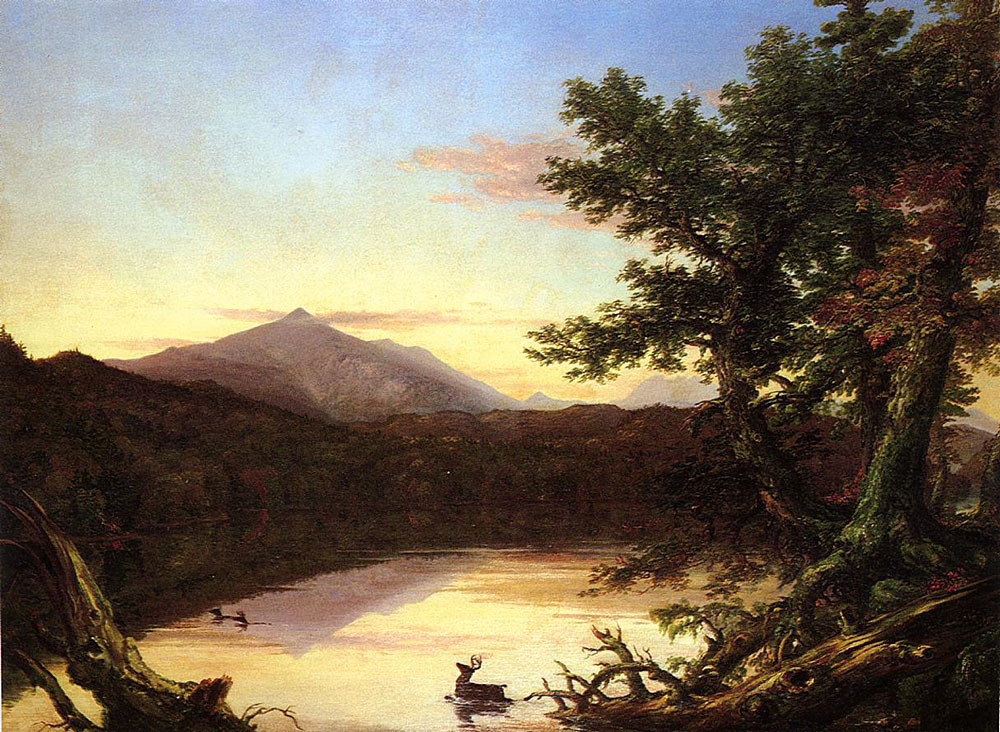
- Schroon Lake by Thomas Cole (1838–40)

- Location in Essex County and the state of New York
- Coordinates: 43°51′45″N 73°44′33″W
- Country: United States
- State: New York
- County: Essex

Government
  - Type: Town Council
  - Town Supervisor: Meg Wood (R)
  - Town Council: Members' List: • Lynn Donaldson; • Richard Gero; • Ethan Thompson; • Leanna Welch

Area
  - Total: 141.41 sq mi (366.24 km^{2})
  - Land: 132.68 sq mi (343.64 km^{2})
  - Water: 8.73 sq mi (22.60 km^{2})
- Elevation: 312 ft (95 m)

Population (2020)
  - Total: 1,880
  - Density: 12.1/sq mi (4.67/km^{2})
- Time zone: UTC-5 (Eastern (EST))
  - Summer (DST): UTC-4 (EDT)
- ZIP Codes: 12870 (Schroon Lake); 12872 (Severance); 12858 (Paradox); 12857 (Olmstedville)
- Area code: 518
- FIPS code: 36-031-65629
- GNIS feature ID: 0942185
- Website: townofschroonny.gov

Schroon (/ˈskruːn/ SKROON) is a town in the Adirondack Park, in Essex County, New York, United States. The population was 1,880 at the 2020 census. The largest community in the town is the hamlet of Schroon Lake, located at the northern end of the lake of the same name.

The Town of Schroon is in the southern part of Essex County. The town contains two lakes: the northern two-thirds of 9-mile-long (14 km) Schroon Lake, and 5-mile-long (8 km) Paradox Lake. The two lakes are connected by the Schroon River, a southward-flowing tributary of the Hudson River.

== History ==
The Town of Schroon was first settled by Europeans in 1804 from part of the Town of Crown Point, north of the current Schroon Lake hamlet, as part of France's colonial holdings south of Quebec. The town was partitioned to form the newer Town of Minerva in 1817. In 1840, part of Schroon was returned to Crown Point. As with other towns of Essex County, the early economy was heavily involved in lumber production. The origination of the name "Schroon" is not precisely known. Some believe it to be derived from a Native American word for "large lake". Others believe it devolved from French soldiers who inhabited the region during the French & Indian Wars. The soldiers were enamored with Madame Scarron (a popular paramour of French King Louis XIV and prior to that the wife of noted French poet/playwright Paul Scarron). In the late 1800s the Village of Schroon became a destination for wealthy families from the NY Metropolitan area. Their trip started in New York City by rail to the town of Riverside, then a stagecoach to Pottersville, and finally aboard a steamer that traveled up the lake to the Village. By 1915, after the introduction of automobiles, people from the cities were flocking to the Schroon Lake region. Capitalizing on this booming tourist trade, grand resorts such as Taylor's on Schroon (later Scaroon Manor), the Leland House and the Brown Swan – along with a number of Adirondack Style Lodges – made Schroon Lake a premier summer vacation spot.

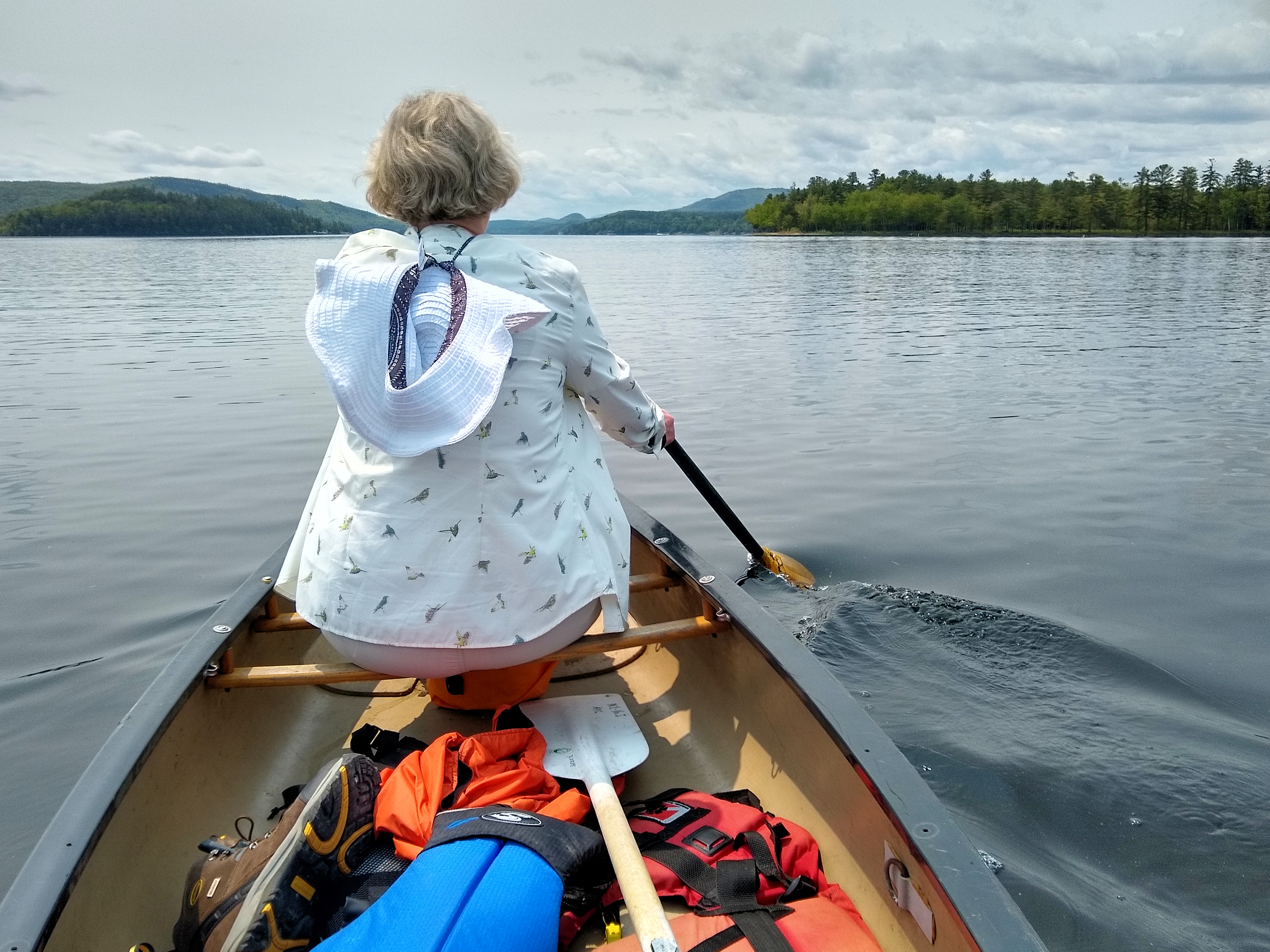

Prior to the construction of the Adirondack Northway (Interstate 87), US Route 9 was the major north–south highway between Albany and Montreal, which made Schroon Lake a convenient stopping point for travelers to purchase gas, lodging, and meals.

The Scaroon Manor resort, which closed in 1962, was the site for the 1957 filming of the Warner Brothers movie Marjorie Morningstar, which starred Gene Kelly, Natalie Wood. Carolyn Jones and Ed Wynn. Also featured in the film was Camp Red Wing (though not mentioned by name) on the east side of the lake, from which Wood and Jones depart by canoe at night for their escape to the musical South Winds (Scaroon Manor). Open to the public for many years, the old Scaroon Manor site is now a NY State Campground.

The "Scaroons" is/are mentioned twice in The Last of the Mohicans by James Fenimore Cooper, as a place seen by Hawkeye (Natty Bumppo), Chingachgook and Uncas after they had departed Horicon (the name used by Cooper for Lake George) while traveling northward chasing Magua and his two captives, Cora and Alice Munro. It is unclear from the context in the book whether Cooper is referring to the lake or a chain of mountains, the latter being a more likely interpretation.

== Geography ==
According to the United States Census Bureau, the town has a total area of 141.4 square miles (366.2 km^{2}), of which 132.7 square miles (343.6 km^{2}) is land and 8.7 square miles (22.6 km^{2}), or 6.17%, is water.

The southern line of Schroon is the border of Warren County. Schroon Lake (the water body) lies in both Essex and Warren counties.

The Adirondack Northway (Interstate 87) passes through the center of the town of Schroon. Access is from Exits 27 and 28. US Route 9 runs parallel to the Interstate. New York State Route 74, an east–west highway, intersects US-9 and the Interstate at Exit 28, west of Severance.

Schroon is approximately 240 miles (390 km) by highway north of New York City, 130 miles (210 km) south of Montreal, and 66 miles (106 km) southwest of Burlington, Vermont.

Schroon has an airfield with a 3,000-foot (910 m) runway that is capable of landing small- and medium-size private airplanes.

The Schroon River flows into the town across the northern town line and flows out across the southern town line towards the Hudson River.

In the town, there are many state hiking trails, some leading to the Hoffman Notch Wilderness area.

== Demographics ==
Historical population
Census	Pop.	Note	%±
1820	888		—
1830	1,614		81.8%
1840	1,660		2.9%
1850	2,031		22.3%
1860	2,550		25.6%
1870	1,899		−25.5%
1880	1,731		−8.8%
1890	1,474		−14.8%
1900	1,272		−13.7%
1910	1,013		−20.4%
1920	852		−15.9%
1930	932		9.4%
1940	1,044		12.0%
1950	1,176		12.6%
1960	1,220		3.7%
1970	1,403		15.0%
1980	1,606		14.5%
1990	1,721		7.2%
2000	1,321		−23.2%
2010	1,654		25.2%
2020	1,880		13.7%
U.S. Decennial Census

As of the census of 2000, there were 1,759 people, 737 households, and 473 families residing in the town. The population density was 13.2 inhabitants per square mile (5.1/km^{2}). There were 2,130 housing units at an average density of 16.0 per square mile (6.2/km^{2}). The racial makeup of the town was White, 98.98% African American, 0.40% Native American, 0.17% Asian, 0.11% from other races, and 0.34% from two or more races. Hispanic or Latino of any race were 0.45% of the population.

There were 737 households, out of which 26.1% had children under the age of 18 living with them, 55.4% were married couples living together, 6.1% had a female householder with no husband present, and 35.8% were non-families. 29.3% of all households were made up of individuals, and 15.1% had someone living alone who was 65 years of age or older. The average household size was 2.34 and the average family size was 2.93.

In the town, the population was spread out, with 22.5% under the age of 18, 6.7% from 18 to 24, 26.4% from 25 to 44, 25.6% from 45 to 64, and 18.8% who were 65 years of age or older. The median age was 42 years. For every 100 females, there were 89.1 males. For every 100 females age 18 and over, there were 89.2 males.

The median income for a household in the town was $29,054, and the median income for a family was $36,579. Males had a median income of $29,821 versus $20,298 for females. The per capita income for the town was $15,302. About 8.5% of families and 11.0% of the population were below the poverty line, including 8.3% of those under age 18 and 9.0% of those age 65 or over.

== Communities and locations in Schroon ==
- The Arlington House – A bed and breakfast in the early 20th century, this 18-bedroom house is a giant in the town.
- Clarks Island — An island in Schroon Lake near Schroon Lake hamlet. The Native American name was Caywanoot. Called Magdalen Island in 1798, and later Islobella, and most recently Word of Life Island, after the current owner. The home of a youth camp operated by Word of Life Fellowship.
- Loch Muller — A hamlet near the western town line.
- The Narrows - A constricted part of Schroon Lake near South Schroon Lake.
- Paradox - A hamlet near the eastern town line on NY-74, and at the eastern end of Paradox Lake.
- Paradox Lake — A lake located in Schroon by the hamlet of Severance.
- Schroon Falls — A location near the northern town boundary on U.S. Route 9.
- Schroon Lake – A lake located in the south-central portion of the town and extending south into Warren County.
- Schroon Lake – A hamlet on the northwest end of the lake. The town government is located here on the western side of Schroon Lake on US-9. Talichito was listed on the National Register of Historic Places in 2012.
- Schroon Lake Airport (4B7) - A general aviation airport, located northeast of Schroon Lake hamlet.
- Schroon Lake Loop — A hamlet south of Schroon Lake hamlet on US-9.
- Schroon River — A river that flows into the northern end of Schroon Lake.
- Severance — A hamlet in the northern part of the town on NY-74, at the west end of Paradox Lake. It is home to several clusters of rental homes and permanent residences. The Samson Fried Estate was listed on the National Register of Historic Places in 1987.
- South Schroon Lake — A hamlet near the southern end of the lake on US-9.
- The Three Bears — a private community on the eastern side of the lake.

== Local attractions ==
Schroon Lake (43°46′49″N 73°46′40″W) is located in the towns of Schroon and Horicon, and is a year-round tourist destination, with boating, swimming and fishing in the summer and snowmobiling, snowshoeing and ice fishing in the winter; hiking and hunting are popular in the fall and spring.

Each September, hundreds of runners compete in the Adirondack Marathon, which finishes in downtown Schroon Lake. The roads around the lake constitute an almost perfect 26 mile distance.

Schroon's main street is US 9, which offers restaurants, antique and collectible shops, a movie theater and churches. The Town of Schroon maintains public docks in the village area, which makes the shops and restaurants accessible to boaters. Schroon has two free municipal boat launches. New York State has public campsites on Schroon Lake and Paradox Lake.

Schroon Lake is the summer home of the Seagle Festival (formerly Seagle Music Colony). It is also home to Schroon-North Hudson Historical Museum, Natural Stone Bridge & Caves, and a 9-hole golf course located on Hoffman Road. Along with these, there are a few local restaurants and bars.

Schroon Lake is the home of the Word of Life Bible Institute, as well as family and youth camps and programs. The town is also the home of Camp Southwoods, a traditional, co-ed, resident camp on Paradox Lake.
