= Hawthorne Gospel Church =

Church in New Jersey, US

Coordinates: 40.976617°N 74.158885°W

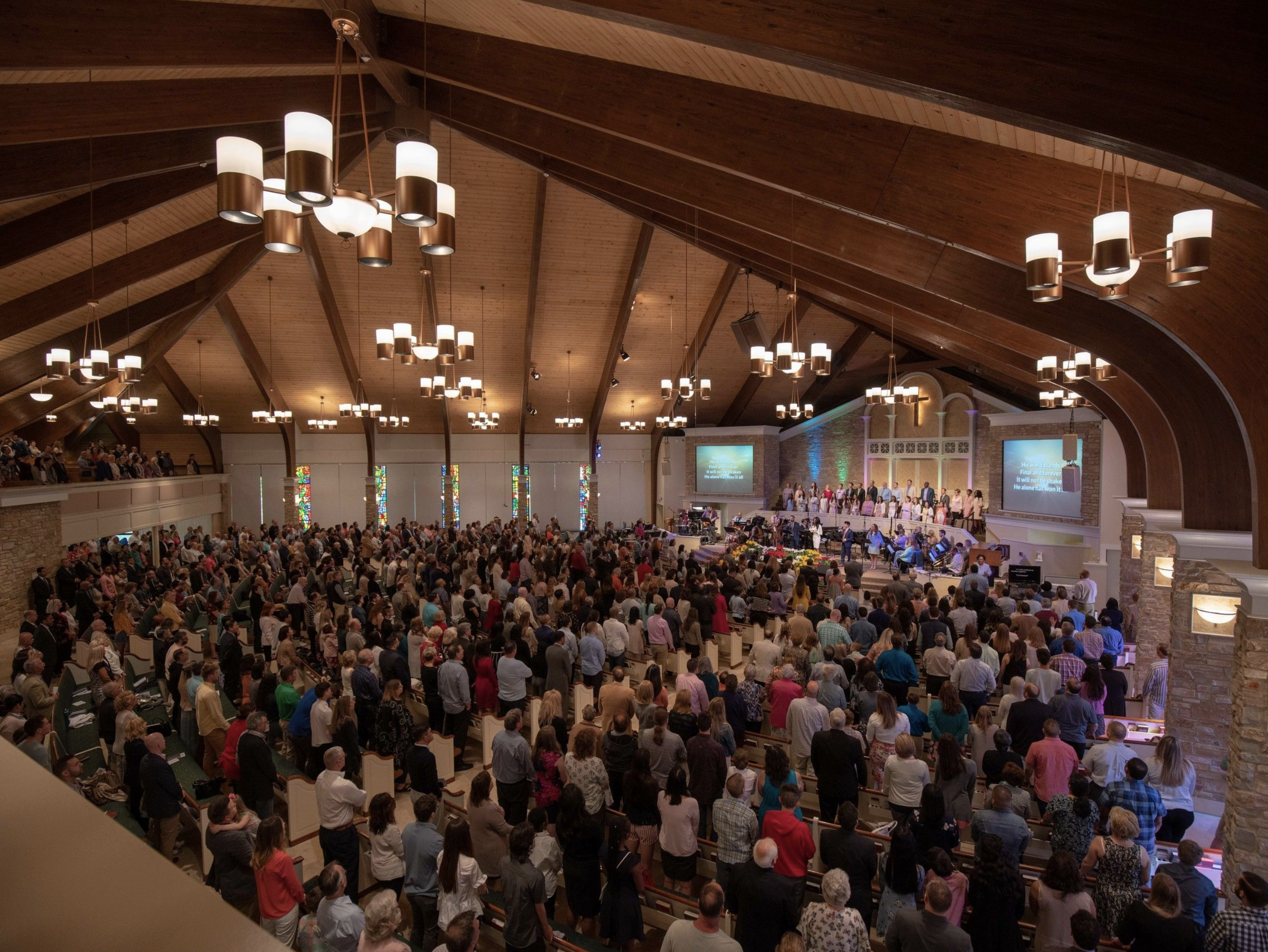
- Hawthorne Gospel Church
- Location: 2000 RT 208; Hawthorne, New Jersey 07506
- Country: United States
- Denomination: Non-Denominational
- Website: hawthornegospel.org

History
- Founded: 1925
- Founder: Herrmann G. Braunlin

Architecture
- Architect: J. Robert Gilchrist

Hawthorne Gospel Church in Hawthorne, New Jersey, is a non-denominational church located in northern New Jersey, being located along a major highway, New Jersey Route 208. The campus in Hawthorne covers 22 acres of land and includes a 1,700-seat worship center, a school offering Pre-Kindergarten through Grade 12, sports fields, a pool, and a library.

== Beliefs ==
The mission of Hawthorne Gospel Church is to glorify God by "Developing fully devoted followers of Jesus Christ". The church's 'beliefs' center on these ten principles:

- In the verbal inspiration of all the Scriptures, both the Old and New Testaments, and that they are the final authority in faith and life.
- In one God, eternally existing in three persons: Father, Son, and Holy Spirit.
- In the total depravity of all humanity, and the necessity of regeneration.
- That salvation is the free gift of God, entirely apart from works, and is possessed by all who by faith received the Lord Jesus Christ as their personal Savior.
- In the virgin birth of Christ, and that he is true God and true man.
- That the Lord Jesus Christ died for our sins, and that with his shed blood, he obtained for us an eternal redemption.
- In the resurrection of the crucified body of our Lord, in his ascension into heaven, and in his present life as our high priest and advocate.
- That the Holy Spirit is a divine person and that he indwells all believers.
- In the personal, pre-millennial, imminent return of our Lord Jesus Christ.
- In the bodily resurrection of the just and the unjust, the everlasting blessedness of the saved, and the everlasting punishment of the lost.

== History ==
Hawthorne Gospel Church was founded on June 5, 1925, but has roots in a campaign in Paterson from April 4 to May 23, 1915, by evangelist Billy Sunday. As a result of the campaign, a ladies' Bible class was begun, taught by Alma Fischer. One of the men, waiting for his wife at the Bible class, suggested that they consider Sunday afternoon meetings that would not be held at "church time". Two of the men would think of renting the Lafayette Avenue Fire Hall for this purpose.

On June 5, 1925, the Sunday afternoon meetings began in that Fire Hall, and a few months later, Sunday School began with 24 children attending. These meetings, held during the summers of 1928 to 1933, were conducted in tents, the first located on property on Lafayette Avenue, where the Louis Bay II Library now stands.

On Thanksgiving Day, 1930, there was the dedication of a church building on Lafayette Avenue, a few doors up the street from the Fire Hall. The Hawthorne Gospel Mission as it was originally known became the Hawthorne Gospel Church in 1932.

In 1934, Hermann G. Braunlin became the first full-time pastor. In 1941, the church began a radio ministry, broadcasting the Sunday morning worship service. "Inspiration Time" was then on WPAT each weekday morning.

In 1953, the church purchased the 15-acre land on Route 208. A pavilion was later constructed, the first building on the new property, in 1958. The property next door was purchased too and used for the Hawthorne Bible House, a Christian bookstore sponsored by the church. In 1984, the Hawthorne Christian Academy, a Pre-K through 12 grade school, was established. In 1999, three morning services were instituted with an average attendance of 2,600 each Sunday. In 2020, the church established the new Hackensack campus at the former First Baptist Church of Hackensack.

== Ministries ==
The ministries at Hawthorne Gospel Church are "all for the purpose of pursuing Jesus Christ more in everything that we do." With staff and volunteer ministers, Hawthorne Gospel provides biblical teachings and worship services. It also has Bible Education classes, a 60+ church choir, orchestra, band and specialized ministries for adults, children, students, as well as mission outreach.

The church operates a day camp ministry, known as the Top of The Hill Day Camp, which offers boys and girls entering grades 1 through 6 a day camp program for each age group. They also have a Sports Camp at Top of the Hill Day Camp, which is optional and free to campers entering 5th and 6th grades.

== Hawthorne Christian Academy ==
Hawthorne Christian Academy is located on the church campus and has approximately 477 students enrolled in pre-kindergarten through grade 12.
