= Marjorie Morningstar (film) =

1958 film by Irving Rapper

- Theatrical release poster
- Directed by: Irving Rapper
- Screenplay by: Everett Freeman
- Based on: Marjorie Morningstar by Herman Wouk
- Produced by: Milton Sperling
- Starring: Gene Kelly; Natalie Wood; Claire Trevor; Ed Wynn; Everett Sloane; Martin Milner; Carolyn Jones
- Cinematography: Harry Stradling
- Edited by: Folmar Blangsted
- Music by: Max Steiner
- Color process: WarnerColor
- Production company: Beachwold Productions
- Distributed by: Warner Bros. Pictures
- Release date: April 24, 1958
- Running time: 123 minutes
- Country: United States
- Language: English
- Budget: $2 million
- Box office: $3 million (US and Canada rentals)

Marjorie Morningstar is a 1958 American drama film directed by Irving Rapper from a screenplay by Everett Freeman, based on the 1955 novel of the same name by Herman Wouk. The film tells a fictional coming-of-age story about a Jewish girl named Marjorie Morgenstern in New York City in the 1950s, chronicling her attempts to become an artist—exemplified through her relationship with the actor and playwright Noel Airman. The film stars Gene Kelly and Natalie Wood, with Claire Trevor, Ed Wynn, Everett Sloane, Martin Milner, and Carolyn Jones.

The central conflict in the film revolves around the traditional models of social behavior and religious behavior expected by New York Jewish families in the 1950s, and Marjorie's desire to follow an unconventional path. The film is notable for its inclusion of Jewish religious scenes—including a Passover meal, a synagogue sequence, and Jewish icons in the Morgenstern house. These depictions were one of the first times Jewish religion was portrayed overtly in film since The Jazz Singer (1927). The film received an Academy Award nomination for Best Song ("A Very Precious Love"), sung by Kelly.

== Plot ==
College student Marjorie Morgenstern brings her boyfriend Sandy Lamm to attend her family's synagogue. Her parents Rose and Arnold are happy with her choice of mate (department store heir), and Rose tells Arnold that she hopes the two will marry. However, Marjorie rejects Sandy's proposal and goes to a Catskills resort that summer to be a camp counselor.

One night, Marjorie and friend Marsha Zelenko sneak to a Borscht Belt resort for adults called South Wind. Marjorie stumbles into a rehearsal for a dance routine, and she is noticed hiding in the back by social director Noel Airman. After watching, and trying to return to camp, she is caught by resort owner Maxwell Greech, but Noel vouches for Marjorie and offers her a job. She begins a relationship with Noel and a friendship with aspiring playwright Wally Wronkin, who writes Noel's stage act. Wally has a romantic interest in Marjorie, but she is tempted by the older, more seasoned Noel, who meets with disapproval from her parents. Noel, a law school dropout whose original surname was the more Jewish Ehrman, renames Marjorie as well from Morgenstern to Morningstar.

Marjorie's sweet Uncle Samson comes to the resort to keep an eye on her. Samson intervenes as a waiter to warn Noel not to take advantage of Marjorie's good nature and youth. Noel reconsiders his plan to woo her into bed, and tells Marjorie that he will never be subjected to a life of mediocrity and married suburban life. Their on-off relationship continues all summer, but turns sour again when Marjorie's parents grill Noel on his career plans for the future, as Noel does not want to have anything to do with business aspirations or traditional Jewish life. Later, during a party, Marjorie notices that her uncle is feeling unwell but is distracted by Noel, who professes his uncontrollable attraction for her. When her uncle dies of a heart attack unattended, Marjorie blames herself, and leaves Noel to go back to the city.

A year later, Marjorie graduates from college and plans to continue her acting career, to her parents' chagrin. She ends up dating a steady but bland doctor named David Harris, with whom she quickly breaks up when Noel returns to find her showing up in a limousine. Noel declares that love has convinced him to become respectable and conventional. Marjorie tells Rose, who insists her daughter bring him to a Passover meal. When Marjorie protests that Noel is not very religious and does not believe in family, faith or tradition, Rose bluntly asks Marjorie how she and Noel will raise their children in the future. In the midst of the Passover meal, Noel leaves, and Marjorie follows him. She is concerned that he is bored, but he admits that he was disturbed, thinking of all the things he has missed in life, including family, faith and tradition. He then professes, "I love you very much, Marjorie Morgenstern."

Noel is hired by an advertising firm and seems to do well, but one week he does not show up at work and refuses to take Marjorie's calls. She goes to his apartment and finds him drunk with a strange woman. Noel admits that he hates his conventional job and professional lifestyle, and is jealous of Wally Wronkin's success as a playwright on Broadway. Marjorie decides to support Noel's return to his artistic roots, and finds some potential investors for Noel's new play. Wally and the investors critique the play's ending as being depressing and not viable, but in a fit of rage, Noel refuses to make the changes required to appease them. Despite Noel's outbursts, the investors are convinced to back the play with Wally's lukewarm assurances that it is viable enough. The play is panned by critics, and a distressed Noel leaves for Europe, leaving behind a break-up note for Marjorie. Marjorie travels to Europe to search for Noel. In London, she meets Wally who tells her that Noel is back at South Wind, the resort where they first met.

Marjorie returns to South Wind, where she secretly watches Noel rehearsing a new summer show. Everything is exactly as it was, her first summer there, except for herself. She overhears an impressionable young woman admire Noel and recognizes her callowness and need to move on from the relationship. Greech observes that she has done some growing up. As Marjorie boards a bus, she sees Wally sitting in the back through the rearview mirror. Wally smiles, as he has been waiting for her to get over her summer fling and hopes to be the one to date her next.

== Cast ==
- Gene Kelly as Noel Airman
- Natalie Wood as Marjorie Morgenstern
- Claire Trevor as Rose Morgenstern
- Everett Sloane as Arnold Morgenstern
- Martin Milner as Wally Wronkin
- Carolyn Jones as Marsha Zelenko
- George Tobias as Maxwell Greech
- Martin Balsam as Dr. David Harris
- Jesse White as Lou Michelson
- Edd Byrnes as Sandy Lamm
- Paul Picerni as Philip Berman
- Alan Reed as Puddle Podell
- Ruta Lee as Imogene Norman
- Ed Wynn as Uncle Samson
- Leslie Bradley as Blair (uncredited)
- Pierre Watkin as Civil Official (uncredited)

== Production ==
The film was mainly shot at Scaroon Manor in upstate New York. The footage of fictitious Camp Tamarack was filmed at Camp Cayuga, Schroon Lake, N.Y. in Essex County, N.Y. Part of the film was filmed in Glens Falls, N.Y. and Warren County, N.Y. Despite the central themes of Judaism highlighted, less than half of the actors—and none of the women—in the headlined cast were brought up In Jewish families (Jones having converted upon marriage).

Until Marjorie Morningstar, Natalie Wood had played mostly child-like roles, including that of Judy in Rebel Without a Cause. A New York Times reviewer wrote "Natalie Wood, who only yesterday was playing with dolls in films, has blossomed into a vivacious pretty brunette who very likely is as close to a personification of Marjorie as one could wish. But the character is hardly complex, and while Miss Wood is competent in the role, it is rarely a glowing performance."

Gene Kelly was near the end of his film acting career when he appeared in Marjorie Morningstar. His 15-year association with Metro-Goldwyn-Mayer had ended the previous year. Born in 1912, he was age 46 when he took the role of Noel Airman. By contrast, his love interest Wood was only age 20. The Times noted: "Although Mr. Kelly appears a mite uncomfortable in his assignment, he plays it with understanding. And, as a professional song-and-dance man, he both hoofs with polish and pleasingly warbles 'A Very Precious Love,' the film's theme number."

Times critiques of the other performances: "Carolyn Jones, as Miss Wood's best friend, makes it an outspoken performance marked by one truly poignant scene in which she reveals her essential loneliness. Ed Wynn, in the comparatively short role of an impecunious but understanding relative, adds some glint of humor and compassion. Claire Trevor, as Marjorie's over-protective mother and Martin Milner, as the playwright, who is one of Marjorie's retinue of devoted suitors, are well-turned, if not inspired, characterizations."

== Differences between the film and novel ==
The most significant difference between the 1955 novel and the 1958 film is the ending. At the end of the novel, the free-spirited Marjorie Morningstar settles down with a man agreeable to her parents. In a criticism of Herman Wouk's ending, Alana Newhouse writes in Slate that "In the final nine pages, the formerly vibrant Marjorie gives up on her career, marries a man named Sidney—er, Milton—Schwartz, and moves to Westchester...Most female readers cry when they reach the end of this book, and for good reason. Marjorie Morningstar, as they came to know her, has become another woman entirely: 'You couldn't write a play about her that would run a week, or a novel that would sell a thousand copies...The only remarkable thing about Mrs. Schwartz is that she ever hoped to be remarkable, that she ever dreamed of being Marjorie Morningstar.'"

The film's ending suggests a possible relationship between Marjorie and Wally Wronkin, the playwright. Although he is successful, he is far more artistic than the Milton Schwartz that Marjorie settles for at the end of the novel. This ending suggests a different conceit in the film than Wouk's novel. The novel suggests that people grow up to realize they have no real choice but to follow their family and upbringing. The film's ending suggests that maturity implies assuming responsibility for one's choices and finishing what was started. Wally had been waiting for Marjorie to learn that Noel will never mature in this sense. In the novel the moral seems to be that her only solution is to settle, as her Mother warns her, for someone to take care of her. In the movie, she begins a new journey.

The film is also contemporary, set in the late 1950s, whereas the novel is set in the 1930s.

== Awards and nominations ==
Award	Category	Nominee(s)	Result
Academy Awards	Best Song	"A Very Precious Love"; Music by Sammy Fain; Lyrics by Paul Francis Webster	Nominated
Golden Globe Awards	Most Promising Newcomer – Female	Carolyn Jones	Nominated
Laurel Awards	Top Drama		5th Place
Laurel Awards	Top Female Dramatic Performance	Natalie Wood	5th Place
Laurel Awards	Top Female Supporting Performance	Carolyn Jones	Won
Laurel Awards	Top Music Composer	Max Steiner	Won
Laurel Awards	Top Music Director	Ray Heindorf	Won
Laurel Awards	Top Song	"A Very Precious Love"; Music by Sammy Fain; Lyrics by Paul Francis Webster	Won

== See also ==
- List of American films of 1958

== Sources ==
- Popkin, Henry. The Vanishing Jew of Our Popular Culture: The Little Man Is No Longer There.
- Prell, Riv-Ellen. Fighting to Become Americans: Jews, Gender, and the Anxiety of Assimilation. Beacon Press, Boston.
- Dundes, Alex. The J. A. P. and the J. A. M. in American Jokelore. The Journal of American Folklore > Vol. 98, No. 390 (Oct., 1985), pp. 456–475
- Weiler, A.H. Version of Wouk Novel Opens at Music Hall. NY Times, page 32, April 25, 1959.
- Tanabe, Kunio Francis. The Washington Post Book Club - Marjorie Morningstar' by Herman Wouk/ The Washington Post, page BW13, July 4, 2004.
- Newhouse, Alana. Why Do Women Love Marjorie Morningstar? Slate Magazine, Sept. 14, 2005.
- Heifetz, Laurie. Scarlett's Falling Morningstar The Forward, May 11, 2007.
