= Christine Wyrtzen =

American musician

Christine Wyrtzen is a contemporary Christian musician whose music usually falls into the inspirational style.

She was nominated for a Dove Award in 1982. She hosts a daily radio program, Daughters of Promise. She has also written two books, Carry Me: Christine Wyrtzen's Discoveries on the Journey into God's Arms (ISBN 0802428363) and Long Live the Child: Devotions Designed for Daughters of Promise (ISBN 0310246520).

== Partial discography ==
- A Little Bit of Sunshine (1976)
- Have You Ever Said Thank You (1977)
- Precious (1978)
- Simply Love (1980)
- Back Home (1980)
- My Best To You (1980)
- Christine's Christmas (1982)
- Critter County (1984)
- For Those Who Hurt (1984)
- Person To Person (1986)
- Daughter of Promise (1998)
- Suspended In The Spirit (2006)
- Classic Christine (2008)
- Alto Flute Christmas (2009)
