= Ottawa Ladies' College =

Non-denominational Ottawa educational institution

Ottawa Ladies College
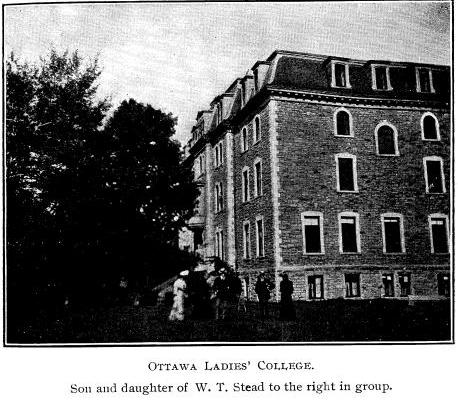
- Type: Private college
- Active: 1869–1942
- Affiliations: Non-denominational
- Location: Ottawa, Ontario, Canada
- Campus: Urban

The Ottawa Ladies' College was a non-denominational Ottawa educational institution founded in 1869 for the purpose of providing a quality education to women. The private school operated on First Avenue in The Glebe from 1914 to 1942. During the Second World War, the Ladies College facilities were used by the Canadian Military. Later as Carleton College, the premises played a vital part in the establishment of Carleton University.

== History ==
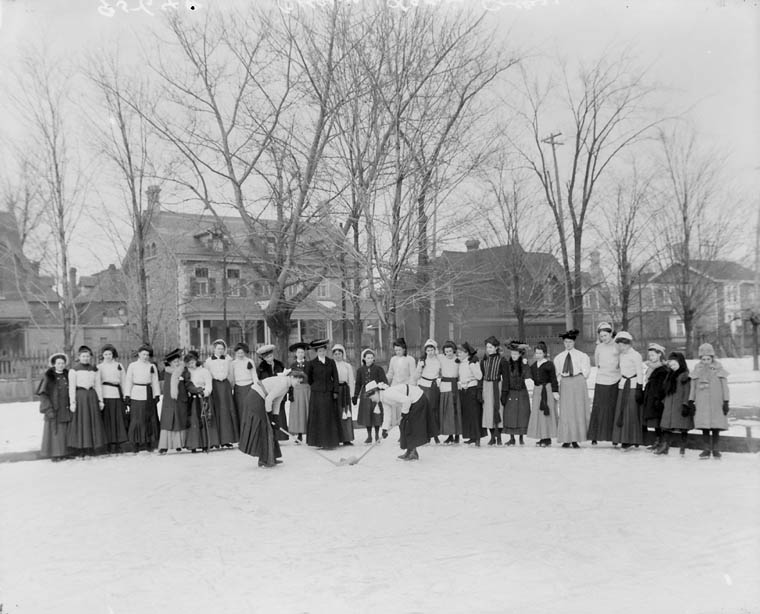
Ottawa Ladies' College group playing hockey, 1906

Originally named the Presbyterian Ladies' College because of its association with the Presbyterian Church, the Ottawa Ladies' College was founded in Centretown in 1869 by Henry Franklin Bronson. The college was re-established in 1914 in a large building designed by Edgar Lewis Horwood located at 268 First Ave. In 1942, the college was expropriated for use as barracks for the Canadian Women's Army Corps. In 1947, the building served as the campus of the new Carleton College, which would evolve into Carleton University. The university used the facilities until it moved to its present site beside the Rideau River in 1959. The Ottawa Board of Education used the building for offices until 1998 when it was sold to a developer to create condominiums.

== Purpose and courses of instruction ==
The purpose of the college was the improvement of women's education. Grade levels were grade 1 to post-secondary. Courses included languages, mathematics, science, athletics, handicrafts, and household arts such as practical cooking, needlework and sewing. Horseback riding and pantomime courses were also offered.
