= Schroon Lake (New York lake) =

Lake in New York state

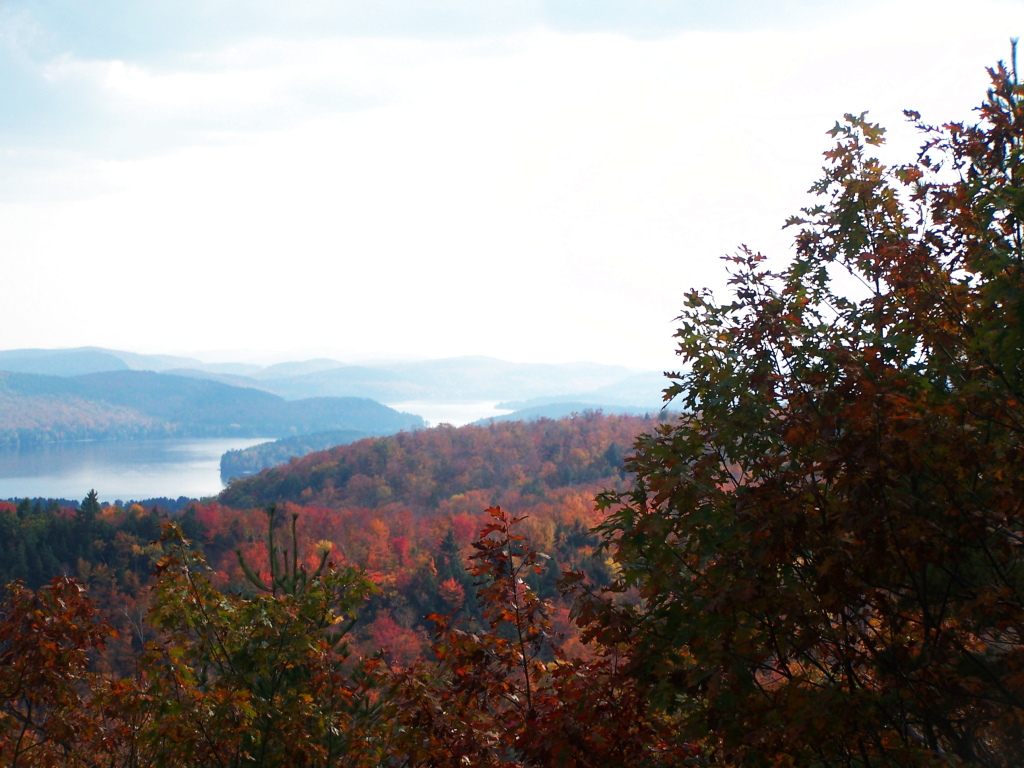
- Schroon Lake from Severance Hill

- Location within New York Schroon Lake (the United States)
- Location: Warren County/ Essex County, New York
- Coordinates: 43°46′49″N 73°46′40″W, 43°44′29″N 73°47′41″W, 43°50′04″N 73°44′47″W
- Type: Lake
- Primary inflows: Schroon River, Rogers Brook, Horseshoe Pond Brook, Sucker Brook, Spectacle Brook
- Primary outflows: Schroon River
- Basin countries: United States
- Surface area: 4,105 acres (16.61 km^{2})
- Average depth: 56 feet (17 m)
- Max. depth: 152 feet (46 m)
- Shore length^{1}: 24.7 miles (39.8 km)
- Surface elevation: 807 feet (246 m)
- Islands: 2 Clarks Island
- Settlements: Schroon Lake, New York, Adirondack, New York
- ^{1} Shore length is not a well-defined measure.

Schroon Lake is located near Schroon Lake, New York. Fish species present in the lake are lake trout, landlocked salmon, largemouth bass, smallmouth bass, northern pike, yellow perch, chain pickerel, rock bass, sunfish, and brown bullhead. There are three access points on the lake. One is a state owned hard surface ramp off US-9, just north of the hamlet of Pottersville. The second is a state owned hand launch access at the Eagle Point Campground off US-9, 2 miles north of the hamlet of Pottersville. The third is a village owned public beach launch access off US-9, in the village of Schroon Lake.
