= Schroon Lake (hamlet), New York =

Schroon Lake, New York
- Census-designated place
- Location within New York Location within the United States
- Coordinates: 43°50′18″N 73°45′42″W
- Country: United States
- State: New York
- County: Essex
- Town: Schroon

Area
  - Total: 3.68 sq mi (9.54 km^{2})
  - Land: 2.89 sq mi (7.48 km^{2})
  - Water: 0.80 sq mi (2.07 km^{2})
- Elevation: 866 ft (264 m)

Population (2020)
  - Total: 921
  - Density: 319.1/sq mi (123.21/km^{2})
- Time zone: UTC-5 (Eastern (EST))
  - Summer (DST): UTC-4 (EDT)
- ZIP code: 12870
- FIPS code: 36-65640

Schroon Lake (/ˈskruːn/ SKROON) is a hamlet and census-designated place (CDP) in the town of Schroon in Essex County, New York, United States. The population was 833 at the 2010 census, or just over half of the total population of the town of Schroon.

== Geography ==
Schroon Lake CDP is located in the center of the town of Schroon, at the northern end of Schroon Lake, the water body. U.S. Route 9 is the main road through the community, while Interstate 87 passes through the western part of the CDP. The CDP extends north along US 9 to Alder Meadow Road and south to Kates Way. The closest I-87 access is from Exit 28 (NY-74), north of the hamlet or Exit 27 (South Schroon Road) to the south.

According to the United States Census Bureau, the Schroon Lake CDP has a total area of 3.68 square miles (9.54 km^{2}), of which 2.89 square miles (7.48 km^{2}) is land and 0.80 square miles (2.07 km^{2}), or 27.34%, is water.

== Demographics ==
Historical population
Census	Pop.	Note	%±
2020	921		—
U.S. Decennial Census

== Education ==
The census-designated place is in the Schroon Lake Central School District.
