= List of airports in New York (state) =

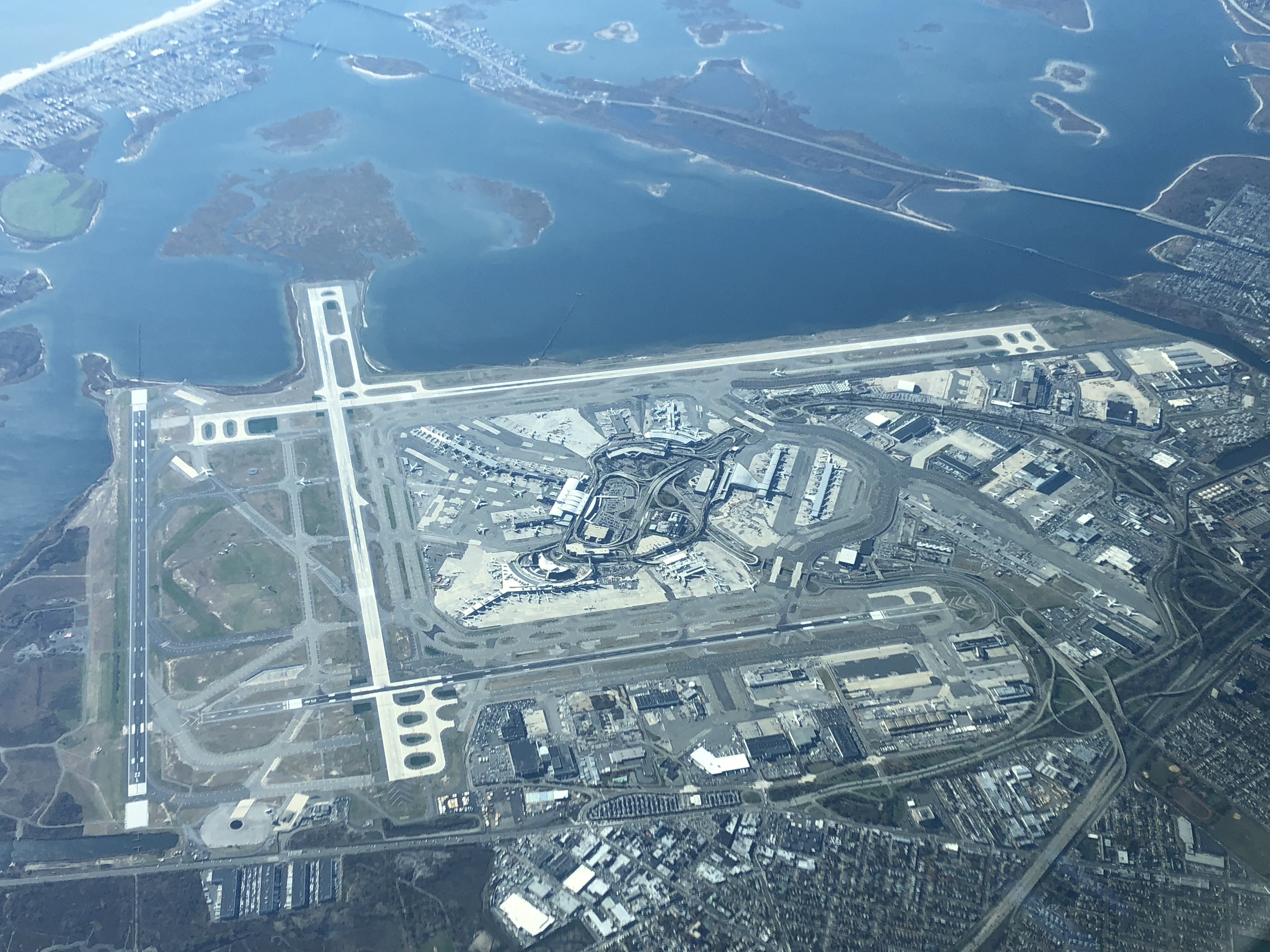
John F. Kennedy International Airport, the largest airport in New York

This is a list of airports in New York State, grouped by type and sorted by location. It contains all public-use and military airports in the state. Some private-use and former airports may be included where notable, such as airports that were previously public-use, those with commercial enplanements recorded by the FAA or airports assigned an IATA airport code.

== Airports ==
This list contains the following information:

- **City served** – The city generally associated with the airport, as per the airport's master record with the Federal Aviation Administration. This is not always the actual location since some airports are located in smaller towns outside of the city they serve. It is not meant to be a complete list of cities served, which can be found in or added to each airport's Wikipedia article.
- **FAA** – The location identifier assigned by the Federal Aviation Administration (FAA). These are linked to each airport's page at the New York State Department of Transportation.
- **IATA** – The airport code assigned by the International Air Transport Association (IATA). Those that do not match the FAA code are shown in bold.
- **ICAO** – The location indicator assigned by the International Civil Aviation Organization (ICAO).
- **Airport name** – The official airport name. Those shown in **bold** indicate the airport has scheduled passenger service on commercial airlines.
- **Role** – One of four FAA airport categories, as per the 2021–2025 National Plan of Integrated Airport Systems (NPIAS) report released September 2020:
  - P-s: Commercial service – primary are publicly owned airports that receive scheduled passenger service and have more than 10,000 passenger boardings (enplanements) each year. Each primary airport is sub-classified by the FAA as one of the following four "hub" types (s):
    - L: Large hub that accounts for at least 1% of total U.S. passenger enplanements.
    - M: Medium hub that accounts for between 0.25% and 1% of total U.S. passenger enplanements.
    - S: Small hub that accounts for between 0.05% and 0.25% of total U.S. passenger enplanements.
    - N: Nonhub that accounts for less than 0.05% of total U.S. passenger enplanements, but more than 10,000 annual enplanements.
  - CS: Commercial service – nonprimary are publicly owned airports that receive scheduled passenger service and have at least 2,500 passenger boardings each year.
  - R: Reliever airports are designated by the FAA to relieve congestion at a large commercial service airport and to provide more general aviation access to the overall community.
  - GA: General aviation airports are the largest single group of airports in the U.S. airport system. They are public-use airports that do not have scheduled service or have scheduled service with less than 2,500 passenger boardings each year.
- **Enplanements** – The number of enplanements (commercial passenger boardings) that occurred at the airport in calendar year 2024, as per FAA records released October 2025.

City served	FAA	IATA	ICAO	Airport name	Role	Enplanements (2024)
				**Commercial service – primary airports**		
Albany	ALB	ALB	KALB	**Albany International Airport**	P-S	1,490,673
Binghamton	BGM	BGM	KBGM	**Greater Binghamton Airport** (Edwin A. Link Field)	P-N	24,496
Buffalo	BUF	BUF	KBUF	**Buffalo Niagara International Airport**	P-S	2,499,295
Elmira / Corning	ELM	ELM	KELM	**Elmira/Corning Regional Airport**	P-N	85,696
Ithaca	ITH	ITH	KITH	**Ithaca Tompkins International Airport**	P-N	69,613
New York	JFK	JFK	KJFK	**John F. Kennedy International Airport** (was New York International Airport)	P-L	31,466,102
New York	LGA	LGA	KLGA	**LaGuardia Airport** (and Marine Air Terminal)	P-L	16,715,567
Islip / Brookhaven	ISP	ISP	KISP	**Long Island MacArthur Airport**	P-S	682,804
Newburgh	SWF	SWF	KSWF	**New York Stewart International Airport**	P-N	143,310
Niagara Falls	IAG	IAG	KIAG	**Niagara Falls International Airport**	P-N	59,119
Ogdensburg	OGS	OGS	KOGS	**Ogdensburg International Airport**	P-N	6,269
Plattsburgh	PBG	PBG	KPBG	**Plattsburgh International Airport**	P-N	92,960
Rochester	ROC	ROC	KROC	**Frederick Douglass/Greater Rochester International Airport**	P-S	1,331,837
Syracuse	SYR	SYR	KSYR	**Syracuse Hancock International Airport**	P-S	1,486,554
Watertown	ART	ART	KART	**Watertown International Airport**	P-N	23,188
White Plains	HPN	HPN	KHPN	**Westchester County Airport**	P-S	1,182,394
				**Commercial service – nonprimary airports**		
Massena	MSS	MSS	KMSS	**Massena International Airport** (Richards Field)	CS	5,375
Saranac Lake	SLK	SLK	KSLK	**Adirondack Regional Airport**	CS	4,930
				**Reliever airports**		
Akron	9G3			Akron Airport (Jesson Field)	R	0
Batavia	GVQ		KGVQ	Genesee County Airport	R	9
Brockport	7G0			Ledgedale Airpark	R	0
Buffalo	9G0			Buffalo Airfield	R	0
Canandaigua	IUA		KIUA	Canandaigua Airport	R	29
Farmingdale	FRG	FRG	KFRG	Republic Airport	R	10,021
Kingston	20N			Kingston-Ulster Airport	R	36
Lancaster	BQR		KBQR	Buffalo-Lancaster Regional Airport	R	0
Le Roy	5G0			Le Roy Airport	R	0
Middletown	06N			Randall Airport	R	0
Millbrook	44N			Sky Acres Airport	R	26
Schenectady	SCH	SCH	KSCH	Schenectady County Airport	R	41
Shirley	HWV	**WSH**	KHWV	Brookhaven Airport	R	10
Weedsport	B16			Whitfords Airport	R	0
Williamson / Sodus	SDC		KSDC	Williamson-Sodus Airport	R	0
Wurtsboro	N82			Wurtsboro-Sullivan County Airport	R	0
				**General aviation airports**		
Bayport	23N			Bayport Aerodrome	GA	0
Corning / Painted Post	7N1			Corning-Painted Post Airport	GA	0
Cortland	N03	**CTX**		Cortland County Airport (Chase Field)	GA	0
Dansville	DSV	DSV	KDSV	Dansville Municipal Airport	GA	0
Dunkirk	DKK	DKK	KDKK	Chautauqua County/Dunkirk Airport	GA	10
East Hampton	JPX	HTO	KJPX	East Hampton Airport (was KHTO)	GA	541
Ellenville	N89			Joseph Y. Resnick Airport	GA	0
Endicott	CZG		KCZG	Tri-Cities Airport	GA	5
Fishers Island	0B8	**FID**		Elizabeth Field	GA	277
Fulton	FZY		KFZY	Oswego County Airport	GA	5
Gasport	9G5			Royalton Airport	GA	0
Glens Falls	GFL	GFL	KGFL	Floyd Bennett Memorial Airport	GA	98
Hamilton	VGC		KVGC	Hamilton Municipal Airport	GA	40
Hornell	HTF		KHTF	Hornell Municipal Airport	GA	0
Hudson	1B1	**HCC**		Columbia County Airport	GA	56
Jamestown	JHW	JHW	KJHW	Chautauqua County/Jamestown Airport	GA	27
Johnstown	NY0			Fulton County Airport	GA	7
Lake Placid	LKP	LKP	KLKP	Lake Placid Airport	GA	98
Malone	MAL		KMAL	Malone-Dufort Airport	GA	6
Montauk	MTP	MTP	KMTP	Montauk Airport	GA	422
Montgomery	MGJ	MGJ	KMGJ	Orange County Airport	GA	6
Monticello	MSV	MSV	KMSV	Sullivan County International Airport	GA	60
New York	JRB	JRB	KJRB	Downtown Manhattan/Wall St. Heliport	GA	2
New York	6N5	**TSS**		East 34th Street Heliport	GA	62
New York	6N7	**NYS**		New York Skyports Inc. Seaplane Base	GA	2,835
New York	JRA	JRA	KJRA	West 30th Street Heliport	GA	70
Norwich	OIC	OIC	KOIC	Lt. Warren Eaton Airport (Chenango County Airport)	GA	16
Olean	OLE	OLE	KOLE	Cattaraugus County-Olean Airport	GA	0
Oneonta	N66	**ONH**		Albert S. Nader Regional Airport	GA	31
Penn Yan	PEO		KPEO	Penn Yan Airport	GA	232
Perry / Warsaw, New York	01G			Perry-Warsaw Airport	GA	0
Piseco	K09			Piseco Airport	GA	11
Potsdam	PTD		KPTD	Potsdam Municipal Airport (Damon Field)	GA	35
Poughkeepsie	POU	POU	KPOU	Hudson Valley Regional Airport	GA	25
Rome	RME	RME	KRME	Griffiss International Airport (was Griffiss Air Force Base)	GA	151
Saratoga Springs	5B2			Saratoga County Airport	GA	148
Schroon Lake	4B7			Schroon Lake Airport	GA	0
Seneca Falls	0G7			Finger Lakes Regional Airport	GA	8
Sidney	N23	**SXY**		Sidney Municipal Airport	GA	3
South Bethlehem	4B0			South Albany Airport	GA	0
Ticonderoga	4B6			Ticonderoga Municipal Airport	GA	5
Warwick	N72			Warwick Municipal Airport	GA	0
Wellsville	ELZ	ELZ	KELZ	Wellsville Municipal Airport (Tarantine Field)	GA	0
Westhampton Beach	FOK	FOK	KFOK	Francis S. Gabreski Airport	GA	873
				**Other public-use airports** (not listed in NPIAS)		
Albion	9G6			Pine Hill Airport		
Arcade	D23			Arcade Tri-County Airport		
Argyle	1C3			Argyle Airport		
Buffalo / East Amherst	D51			Clarence Aerodrome		
Cambridge	1B8			Chapin Field		
Clay	1H1			Airlane Enterprises Airport		
Cooperstown	K23	**COP**		Cooperstown-Westville Airport		
Degrasse	1E8			Moores Airport		
Duanesburg	4B1			Duanesburg Airport		
East Moriches	49N			Lufker Airport		
East Moriches	1N2			Spadaro Airport		
Edinburg	1F2			Plateau Sky Ranch Airport		
Freehold	1I5			Freehold Airport		
Gallupville	N25			Blue Heron Airport		
Gansevoort	K30			Heber Airpark		
Geneseo	D52			Geneseo Airport		1
Ghent	NY1			Kline Kill Airport		
Gorham	92G			Midlakes Airport		
Gowanda	D59			Gowanda Airport		
Great Valley	N56			Great Valley Airport		
Greene	4N7			Greene Airport		
Greenville	1H4			Greenville-Rainbow Airport		
Hamburg	4G2			Hamburg Airport		
Haverstraw	H43			Haverstraw Heliport		
Keene	1I1			Marcy Field		
Livingston	1A1			Green Acres Airport		
Lockport	0G0			North Buffalo Suburban Airport		
Long Lake	NY9			Long Lake Helms Seaplane Base		4
Long Lake	K03			Long Lake Sagamore Seaplane Base & Marina		
Mattituck	21N			Mattituck Airport		
Mayville	D79			Dart Airport		
Middlesex	4N2			Middlesex Valley Airport		
New York / Bronx	6N6			Evers Seaplane Base		
Newfane	85N			Hollands International Field		
Olean	8G3			Giermek Executive Airport		
Ovid	D82			Ovid Airport		
Port Washington	7N3			Sands Point Seaplane Base		
Rome	K16			Becks Grove Airport		
Round Lake	W57			Round Lake Airport		
Rouses Point	K21			Rouses Point Seaplane Base		
Schuylerville	B04			Garnseys Airport		
Sharon Springs	K31			Sharon Airport		
Sherman	D88			Pratt's Eastern Divide Airport		
Skaneateles	6B9			Skaneateles Aero Drome		38
Southampton	87N			Southampton Heliport		43
Spencerport	D91			Spencerport Airpark		
Staatsburg	09N			Airhaven Airport		
Stormville	N69			Stormville Airport		
Troy	5B7			Rensselaer County Airport		
Utica / Frankfort	6B4			Frankfort-Highland Airport		
Wallkill	N45			Kobelt Airport (Wallkill Airport)		
				**Other military airports**		
Fort Drum	GTB		KGTB	Wheeler-Sack Army Airfield		7,416
				**Notable private-use airports**		
Alexandria Bay	89NY	AXB		Maxson Airfield (former public use, FAA: 89N)		
Calverton	3C8	CTO		Calverton Executive Airpark (was FAA: CTO) (former Naval Weapons Industrial Reserve Plant)		
Camillus	NY25			Camillus Airport		
Canandaigua	90NY			Hopewell Airpark (former public-use, FAA: D43)		
Central Square	0NK1			Spring Brook Airport (was listed in 2007 NPIAS as general aviation)	~~GA~~	
Chittenango	NK51			Luther Airport (former public-use, FAA: 1D5)		
Clarence Center	NK19			Potoczak Airport (former public use, FAA: D46)		
Granville	01NK			Granville Airport (was FAA: B01)		
Gouverneur	NK16			Hendricks Field (former public use, FAA: 1K0)		
Hancock	NK68			White Birch Field (former public use, FAA: 4N8)		
Holcomb / Bloomfield	NY95			Creekside Airport		
Ithaca	NY55			Grund Field (former public use, FAA: 5N3)		
Moravia	92NK			Owasco Airfield (was public use, FAA: Y92)		
Quaker Street	65NK			Apex Airport (former public use Knox Airport, FAA: N65)		
Randolph	85NK			Campbell Field (former public use Randolph Airport, FAA: D85)		
Westport	12NK			Westport Airport (former public use, FAA: N25)		
				**Notable former airports**		
Angola	~~D22~~			Angola Airport (closed 2002)	~~R~~	
Bethpage	~~BPA~~			Grumman Bethpage Airport (closed 1990s) (currently Nassau County Police Heliport, FAA: 8NY9)		
Brooklyn				Floyd Bennett Field (closed 1971) (currently NYPD Air Operations Heliport, FAA: NY22)		
Canastota	~~1B8~~			Canastota Municipal Airport (closed 1980s)		
Centerville	~~N01~~			Plane Haven Airport (closed 2005?)		
Cicero	~~1G6~~			Michael Airfield (closed 2009)		
Commack				Brindley Field (closed 1919)		
Coram				Coram Airport (closed 1984)	~~GA~~	
Deer Park				Deer Park Airport (closed 1974)		
Dolgeville	~~1F6~~			Dolgeville Airport		
Dundee	~~D48~~			Dundee Flying Club Airport (closed 2006?)		
Durhamville	~~1B4~~			Kamp Airport (closed 2002)	~~GA~~	
Edgemere				Rockaway Airport / NOLF Edgemere (closed 1959)		
Flushing	~~FLU~~		~~KFLU~~	Flushing Airport (closed 1984)		
Garden City				Roosevelt Field (closed 1951)		
Hauppauge				Smithtown Aviation Country Club (closed 1957)		
Honeoye Falls	~~D70~~			Honeoye Falls Airport (closed 2008?)		
Jackson Heights				Holmes Airport (active 1930s)		
Kirkwood	~~5N5~~			Kirkwood Airpark (closed 2008?)		
Lexington / Prattsville	N00			Maben Airport (closed, but FAA ID active)	~~GA~~	
Mechanicville	~~K27~~			Burrello-Mechanicville Airport		
Monticello	~~N37~~			Monticello Airport (closed 2008?)	~~GA~~	
New Dorp				Miller Field (military, closed 1969)		
New Springville				Staten Island Airport (closed 1964)		
New York				Wall Street Skyport (closed 1980s)		
North Amityville		~~AYZ~~		Zahn's Airport (closed 1980)		
North Rose	~~8B4~~			Farnsworths Air Strip (closed 2006?)		
Olcott / Newfane	D80			Olcott-Newfane Airport (closed, but FAA ID active)		
Peekskill / Verplanck	~~7N2~~			Peekskill Seaplane Base (closed 2007)		
Plattsburgh	PLB	PLB	KPLB	Clinton County Airport (closed, but FAA ID active)	~~GA~~	
Red Hook	~~46N~~			Sky Park Airport		
Rome	~~RME~~	~~RME~~	~~KRME~~	Griffiss Air Force Base (closed 1995, now Griffiss Airfield)		
Romulus	~~SSN~~		~~KSSN~~	Seneca Army Airfield (Seneca Army Depot)		
Scotia	~~K13~~			Mohawk Valley Airport (closed 2010?)		
Selden				Hough Field (closed)		
Stony Brook				Flowerfield Airfield (Gydrodyne Company)		
Syracuse / Central Square	~~6NK~~			Syracuse Suburban Airport		
Utica	~~UCA~~		~~KUCA~~	Oneida County Airport (closed 2007)	~~GA~~	
Waterloo	~~D93~~			Airtrek Airport		

== See also ==
- New York World War II Army Airfields
- Aviation in the New York metropolitan area
- Essential Air Service
