= Pine Hill Airport (New York) =

- IATA: none; ICAO: none; FAA LID: 9G6

Summary
- Airport type: Public use
- Owner: Timothy Allen
- Operator: Vintage Aircraft Group
- Serves: Albion, New York
- Elevation AMSL: 669 ft / 204 m
- Coordinates: 43°10′25″N 078°16′29″W
- Website: VintageAircraftGroup.org

Map
- Location of airport in New York

Runways
Direction	Length		Surface
Direction	ft	m	Surface
10/28	2,659	810	Asphalt

Statistics (2007)
- Aircraft operations: 6,500
- Source: FAA and Vintage Aircraft Group

Pine Hill Airport (FAA LID: 9G6) is a public use airport located five nautical miles (6 mi, 9 km) southwest of Albion, a village in Orleans County, New York, United States. The airport property is owned by Haines Family Farm and leased by the Vintage Aircraft Group.

== Facilities and aircraft ==
Pine Hill Airport covers an area of 49 acres (20 ha) at an elevation of 669 feet (204 m) above mean sea level. It has one runway designated 10/28 with an asphalt surface measuring 2,659 by 36 feet (810 x 11 m). For the 12-month period ending October 17, 2007, the airport had 6,500 aircraft operations, an average of 17 per day: 92% general aviation and 8% military.

== Nearby airports ==
Nearby airports with instrument approach procedures include:

- GVQ – Genesee County Airport (10 nm SE)
- 9G3 – Akron Airport (13 nm SW)
- 7G0 – Ledgedale Airpark (16 nm E)
- 5G0 – Le Roy Airport (19 nm SE)
- 0G0 – North Buffalo Suburban Airport (19 nm W)

== See also ==
- List of airports in New York
