= KPTD =

KPTD may refer to:

- Potsdam Municipal Airport (ICAO code KPTD)
- KPTD-LP, a low-power television station (channel 29, virtual 51) licensed to serve Paris, Texas, United States
