= Genesee County Airport =

- IATA: none; ICAO: KGVQ; FAA LID: GVQ

Summary
- Airport type: Public
- Owner: Genesee County
- Operator: Genesee County Highway Department
- Serves: Batavia, New York
- Elevation AMSL: 914 ft (279 m)
- Coordinates: 43°01′54″N 078°10′11″W
- Website: www.co.genesee.ny.us/...

Map
- Location of airport in New York GVQ (the United States)

Runways
Direction	Length		Surface
Direction	ft	m	Surface
10/28	5,500	1,676	Asphalt

Statistics (2009)
- Aircraft operations: 40,000
- Based aircraft: 48
- Source: Federal Aviation Administration

Genesee County Airport (ICAO: KGVQ, FAA LID: GVQ, formerly 3G8) is a county-owned, public-use airport in Genesee County, New York, United States. It is located two nautical miles (4 km) north of the central business district of Batavia, a city located within the Town of Batavia.

This airport is included in the National Plan of Integrated Airport Systems for 2011–2015, which categorized it as a general aviation reliever airport. Although many U.S. airports use the same three-letter location identifier for the FAA and IATA, this airport is assigned GVQ by the FAA but has no designation from the IATA.

== Facilities and aircraft ==
Genesee County Airport covers an area of 326 acres (132 ha) at an elevation of 914 feet (279 m) above mean sea level. It has one runway designated 10/28 with an asphalt surface measuring 5,500 by 100 feet (1,676 x 30 m).

For the 12-month period ending September 18, 2009, the airport had 40,000 aircraft operations, an average of 109 per day: 96% general aviation, 2% air taxi, and 2% military. At that time there were 48 aircraft based at this airport: 85% single-engine, 4% multi-engine, 6% jet and 4% helicopter.

== Nearby airports ==
Nearby airports with instrument approach procedures include:

- 9G6 – Pine Hill Airport (10 nm NW)
- 5G0 – Le Roy Airport (11 nm E)
- 9G3 – Akron Airport (14 nm W)
- 7G0 – Ledgedale Airpark (14 nm NE)
- ROC – Greater Rochester International Airport (22 nm E)

== See also ==
- List of airports in New York
