= Hamilton Airport =

Hamilton Airport may refer to

- Hamilton Airport (New Zealand)
- Hamilton Airport (Victoria), Australia
- Hamilton Municipal Airport (New York), United States
- Hamilton Municipal Airport (Texas), United States
- Butler County Regional Airport, Ohio, United States
- John C. Munro Hamilton International Airport, Canada
- L.F. Wade International Airport, 6 nautical miles off Hamilton, Bermuda
