= Tri-County Airport =

Tri-County Airport may refer to:

- Tri-County Airport (Florida) in Holmes County, Florida, USA (FAA: 1J0)
- Tri-County Airport (Illinois) in Salem Township, Knox County, Illinois, United States (FAA: 2C6)
- Tri-County Airport (North Carolina) in Hertford County, North Carolina, United States (FAA: ASJ)
- Tri-County Regional Airport in the Town of Spring Green, Wisconsin, United States (FAA: LNR)
- Arcade Tri-County Airport in the Town of Arcade, New York, United States (FAA: D23)
