= Buffalo Airfield =

- IATA: none; ICAO: none; FAA LID: 9G0

Summary
- Airport type: Public use
- Owner: L. J. Pezzanite
- Serves: Buffalo, New York
- Location: West Seneca, New York
- Elevation AMSL: 670 ft (200 m)
- Coordinates: 42°51′43″N 078°42′59″W
- Website: www.buffaloairfield.com/home.html

Map
- Location of airport in New York 9G0 (the United States)

Runways
Direction	Length		Surface
Direction	ft	m	Surface
6/24	2,668	813	Asphalt

Statistics (2009)
- Aircraft operations: 55,000
- Based aircraft: 23
- Source: Federal Aviation Administration

Buffalo Airfield (FAA LID: 9G0) is a privately owned, public use airport located six nautical miles (7 mi, 11 km) southeast of the central business district of Buffalo, in Erie County, New York, United States. It is included in the National Plan of Integrated Airport Systems for 2011–2015, which categorized it as a reliever airport.

Formerly known as Buffalo Airpark and Gardenville Airport, the airfield is located on the north side of Clinton Street (NY-354) between Union Road (NY-277) and Transit Road (NY-78). It is also about 4 miles (6 km) south of Buffalo Niagara International Airport.

The Buffalo Airfield was owned and operated by Robert A. Jacobs from 1986, who purchased it out of bankruptcy (as Buffalo Airpark) and changed the name to Buffalo Airfield. It was previously owned by Anthony "Tony" Riccio (deceased at the time) and purchased out of auction. Jacobs also operated his master plumbing business from this location, Robert Jacobs Plumbing (RJP), established in 1968. He operated an aviation ground school (private and instrument), banner towing company named Rainbow Banner, small airplane maintenance facility, airplane fueling station, and scenic flights with his six small Cessna planes (3-152s & 3-172s) 6538FT/5249D/757MZ. He also hosted several "Fly-in Breakfasts" and "Tri-Five Car Shows" at his facility during the 1990s.

The aviation mechanic shop for inspections was FAA-rated during his operation.

Robert Jacobs was successful in securing several grants from the FAA to expand the PTL light and fence the runway. He also financed the several airplane hangars with his construction company, 4500 Clinton Builders.

FAA grants were also obtained for equipment to remove snow.

== Facilities and aircraft ==
Buffalo Airfield covers an area of 100 acres (40 ha) at an elevation of 670 feet (204 m) above mean sea level. It has one runway designated 6/24 with an asphalt surface measuring 2,668 by 59 feet (813 x 18 m). For the 12-month period ending June 18, 2009, the airport had 55,000 general aviation aircraft operations, an average of 150 per day. At that time, there were 23 aircraft based at this airport: 78% single-engine and 22% multi-engine.

== See also ==
Nearby airports with instrument approach procedures include:

- BUF – Buffalo Niagara International Airport (5 nm N)
- 9G3 – Akron Airport (14 nm NE)
- 0G0 – North Buffalo Suburban Airport (14 nm N)
- IAG – Niagara Falls International Airport (18 nm NW)
- GVQ – Genesee County Airport (26 nm NE)
- List of airports in New York
