= Kobelt =

Kobelt may refer to:

== People ==
- Georg Ludwig Kobelt (1804-1857), German anatomist
- Karl Kobelt (1891-1968), Swiss politician
- Wilhelm Kobelt (1840-1916), German zoologist

== Other ==
- Kobelt Airport, an airport in Ulster County, New York, United States
