= SXY =

SXY may refer to:

- SXY, the Australian Securities Exchange code for Senex Energy, an Australian energy company
- SXY, the IATA code for Sidney Municipal Airport, United States
- SXY, the National Rail code for Saxilby railway station, Lincolnshire, England
