= Skaneateles =

Skaneateles may refer to, in the United States:

== Places ==
- Skaneateles, New York, a town in Onondaga County
  - Skaneateles (village), New York, located within the town
    - Skaneateles Historic District, located within the village
- Skaneateles Falls, New York, an unincorporated community in Onondaga County
- Skaneateles Lake, one of the Finger Lakes in the state of New York
  - Skaneateles Creek, the creek that drains the lake

== Transportation ==
- Skaneateles Aerodrome, an airport near Skaneateles, New York
- Skaneateles Short Line Railroad, operated from 1840 until 1981 within the state of New York
- USS Skaneateles, a patrol boat of the U.S. Navy during the 1930s

== Other uses ==
- Skaneateles Community, a short-lived 1840s utopian social experiment near Mottville, in the town of Skaneateles, New York
