= D23 =

D23 may refer to:

- D23 (Disney), the official fan club and biennial convention of the Walt Disney Company
  - Destination D23, a biennial Disney Parks convention
- Arcade Tri-County Airport (FAA LID: D23), a privately owned, public-use airport in Arcade, New York
- Almirante Valdés (D23), a 1959 Spanish Fletcher-class destroyer
- ARA Almirante Domecq Garcia (D23), a 1971 Argentine Navy Fletcher class destroyer
- HMS Bristol (D23), a 1969 British Royal Navy Type 82 destroyer
- HMS Premier (D23), a 1943 British Royal Navy escort aircraft carrier
- Almirante Brión (D23), a Venezuelan Navy Almirante Clemente-class destroyer
- D23 road (Croatia), a state road
- LNER Class D23, a class of British steam locomotives
