= N25 =

N25, N-25 or N.25 may refer to:

== Roads ==
- Route nationale 25, in France
- N25 road (Ireland)
- N-25 National Highway, in Pakistan
- Nebraska Highway 25, in the United States

== Other uses ==
- N25 (Long Island bus)
- Blue Heron Airport, in Schoharie County, New York, United States
- HMS Thetis (N25), a submarine of the Royal Navy
- London Buses route N25
- Nitrogen-25, an isotope of nitrogen
- Nightcord at 25:00 (N25), a character group from Project Sekai
