= N45 =

N45 may refer to:

== Transportation ==
- N45 (Long Island bus)
- BMW N45, an automobile engine
- Kobelt Airport, in Ulster County, New York, United States
- N-45 National Highway, in Pakistan
- Nebraska Highway 45, in the United States

== Military ==
- HMS Narwhal (N45), a Grampus-class submarine of the Royal Navy sunk in 1940
- HMS Trusty (N45), a T-class submarine of the Royal Navy scrapped in 1947
