= Royalton Airport =

- IATA: 9G5; ICAO: none; FAA LID: 9G5

Summary
- Airport type: Public
- Owner: Royalton Airport, Inc.
- Operator: Kenneth Mcarthur
- Serves: Gasport
- Location: New York
- Elevation AMSL: 628 ft / 191 m
- Coordinates: 43°10′55″N 078°33′28″W
- Interactive map of Royalton Airport

Runways
| Direction | Length | | Surface |
| Direction | ft | m | Surface |
|---|---|---|---|
| 7/25 | 2,530 | 771 | Asphalt |

Statistics (2008)
- Aircraft operations: 6084
- Based aircraft: 43
- Source: Federal Aviation Administration

Royalton Airport (FAA LID: 9G5), is located in Gasport, New York, United States.

== Facilities and aircraft ==
Royalton Airport is situated one mile southeast of the central business district, and contains one runway. The runway, 7/25, is asphalt measuring 2,530 ft × 35 ft (771 m × 11 m).

For the 12-month period ending September 8, 2008, the airport had 6,084 aircraft operations, an average of 117 per week: 82% local general aviation, 16% transient general aviation, and 2% military. At that time there were 43 aircraft based at this airport: 86% single-engine, 5% multi engine, 7% ultralight, and 2% helicopter.

== See also ==
- List of airports in New York
