= N69 =

N69 may refer to:

== Roads ==
- N69 road (Ireland)
- A50 motorway (Netherlands)
- Negros Occidental Eco-Tourism Highway, in the Philippines
- Nebraska Highway 69, in the United States

== Other uses ==
- N69 (Long Island bus)
- Escadrille N.69, a unit of the French Air Force
- Gunbarlang language
- Northrop N-69 Snark, an American cruise missile
- Stormville Airport, in Dutchess County, New York, United States
- Yangman language
