= Sky Ranch Airport =

Sky Ranch Airport may refer to:

- Sky Ranch Airport (Nevada) in Sandy Valley, Nevada, United States (FAA: 3L2)
- Hobart Sky Ranch Airport in Hobart, Indiana, United States (FAA: 3HO)
- Plateau Sky Ranch Airport in Edinburg, New York, United States (FAA: 1F2)
- SkyRanch, an airport in Carefree, Arizona (FAA: 18AZ)
