= Saratoga County Airport =

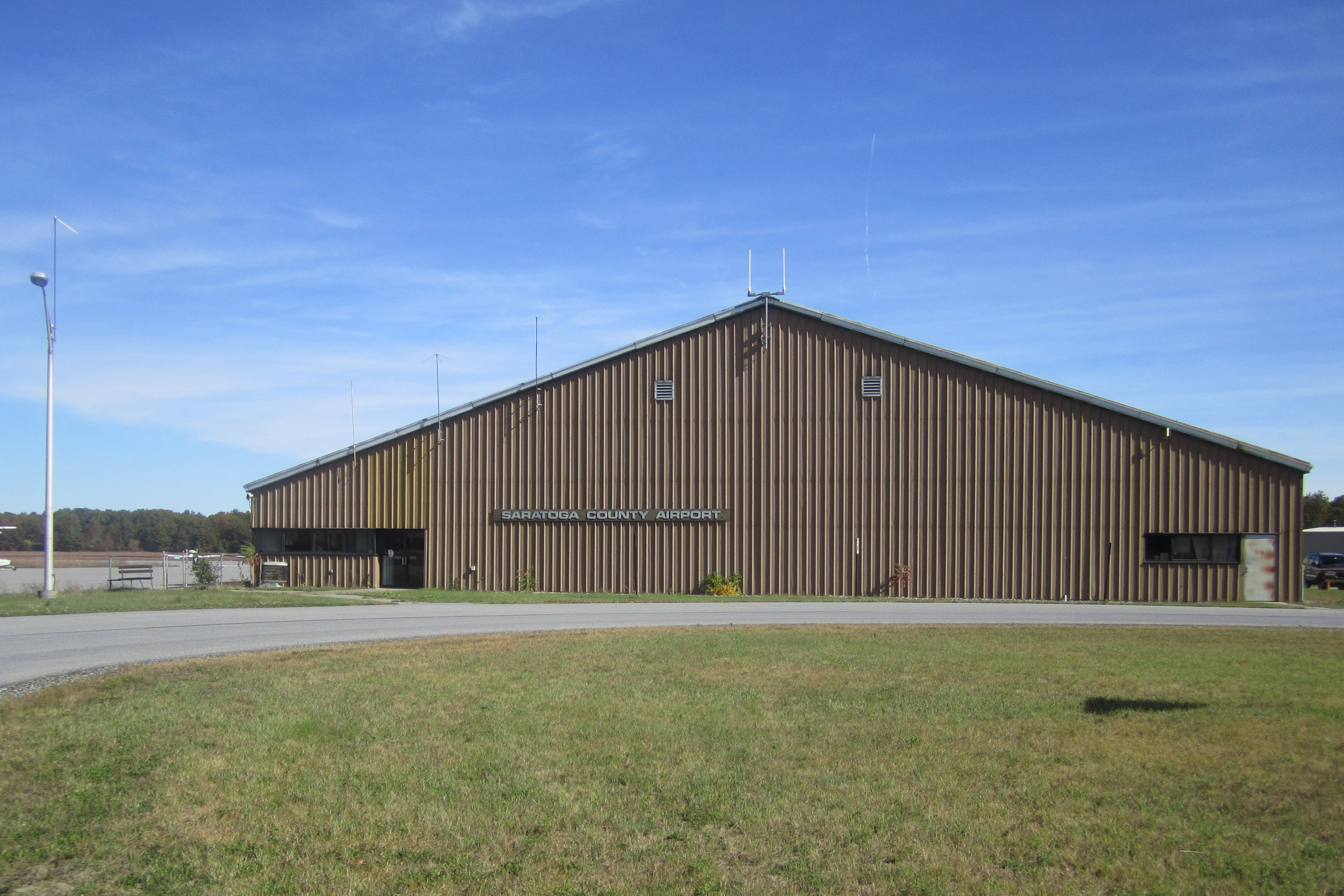
- IATA: none; ICAO: none; FAA LID: 5B2

Summary
- Airport type: Public
- Owner: Saratoga County
- Serves: Saratoga Springs, New York
- Elevation AMSL: 433 ft / 132 m
- Coordinates: 43°03′03″N 073°51′42″W
- Website: http://www.nafsinc.com/

Map
- Location of airport in New York

Runways
Direction	Length		Surface
Direction	ft	m	Surface
5/23	4,699	1,432	Asphalt/concrete
14/32	4,000	1,219	Asphalt/concrete

Statistics (2008)
- Aircraft operations: 38,550
- Based aircraft: 62
- Source: Federal Aviation Administration

Saratoga County Airport (FAA LID: 5B2) is a county-owned, public-use airport located three nautical miles (6 km) southwest of the central business district of Saratoga Springs, a city in Saratoga County, New York, United States. It is included in the National Plan of Integrated Airport Systems for 2011–2015, which categorized it as a general aviation facility.

== Facilities and aircraft ==
Saratoga County Airport covers an area of 300 acres (121 ha) at an elevation of 433 feet (132 m) above mean sea level. It has two runways with asphalt and concrete surfaces: 5/23 is 4,699 by 100 feet (1,432 x 30 m); 14/32 is 4,000 by 100 feet (1,219 x 30 m). Jet aircraft use runways 5 or 23.

For the 12-month period ending August 29, 2008, the airport had 38,550 aircraft operations, an average of 105 per day: 96% general aviation, 4% air taxi, and <1% military. At that time there were 62 aircraft based at this airport: 63% single-engine, 26% glider, 8% multi-engine, 2% jet, and 2% helicopter.

In December 2023, The Saratoga County Board of Supervisors approved the construction of a new fixed base operator terminal building at the airport at a cost of up to $28.51 million.

== Nearby airports ==
Nearby airports with instrument approach procedures include:

- SCH – Schenectady County Airport (12 nm S)
- ALB – Albany International Airport (18 nm S)
- GFL – Floyd Bennett Memorial Airport (21 nm NE)
- NY0 – Fulton County Airport (21 nm W)
- DDH – William H. Morse State Airport (29 nm E)

Other nearby facilities:

- W57 – Round Lake Airport and Seaplane Base (8.3 nm SE)
- K27 – Burrello-Mechanicville Airport (12.7 nm SE)

== See also ==
- List of airports in New York
