= Hendricks Field =

Hendricks Field may refer to:

- Hendricks Field (Nebraska), a private use airport in Grant, Nebraska, United States (FAA: 27NE)
- Hendricks Field (New York), a private use airport in Gouverneur, New York, United States (FAA: NK16, formerly public use: 1K0)
- Hendricks Field Airport at West Creek Ranch, a private use airport in Gateway, Colorado, United States (FAA: 63CO)
- Sebring Regional Airport (formerly Hendricks Field) in Sebring, Florida, United States (FAA: SEF)
