= Cortland County Airport =

- IATA: CTX; ICAO: none; FAA LID: N∅3

Summary
- Airport type: Public
- Owner: Cortland County
- Operator: Robert Buerkle
- Serves: Cortland
- Location: New York
- Elevation AMSL: 1,198 ft (365 m)
- Coordinates: 42°35′33″N 076°12′53″W
- Interactive map of Cortland County Airport

Runways
Direction	Length		Surface
Direction	ft	m	Surface
6/24	3,400	1,036	Asphalt

Statistics (2009)
- Aircraft operations: 17155
- Based aircraft: 38
- Source: Federal Aviation Administration

Cortland County Airport (IATA: CTX, FAA LID: N03), is located west of Cortland, New York, United States. It was formerly named Cortland Municipal Airport.

== Facilities and aircraft ==
Cortland County Airport is situated in the town of Cortlandville, 2 miles (3 km) west of the Cortland central business district, and contains one runway. The runway, 6/24, is asphalt measuring 3,400 ft × 75 ft (1,036 m × 23 m).

For the 12-month period ending September 10, 2009, the airport had 17,155 aircraft operations, an average of 47 per day: 66% local general aviation, and 34% transient general aviation. At that time there were 38 aircraft based at this airport: 90% single-engine, 5% multi-engine and 5% helicopter.

== See also ==
- List of airports in New York
