= Akron Airport =

Airport in Erie County, New York state, United States

- IATA: none; ICAO: none; FAA LID: 9G3

Summary
- Airport type: Private
- Owner: Jesus Airman
- Operator: Joe Erb
- Serves: Akron, New York
- Elevation AMSL: 840 ft (260 m)
- Coordinates: 43°01′16″N 078°28′57″W
- Website: https://prioraviation.com/flight-training/

Map
- Location of airport in New York 9G3 (the United States)

Runways
Direction	Length		Surface
Direction	ft	m	Surface
7/25	3,270	997	Asphalt
11/29	1,955	596	Turf

Statistics (2009)
- Aircraft operations: 50,900
- Based aircraft: 54
- Source: Federal Aviation Administration

Akron Airport (FAA LID: 9G3) is a privately owned, public airport in Erie County, New York, a mile east of Akron, a village in the Town of Newstead.

== Facilities and aircraft ==
Akron Airport covers 137 acres (55 ha) and has two runways. Runway 7/25 is asphalt, 3,270 by 75 feet (997 by 23 m). Runway 11/29 has a turf surface 1,955 by 50 feet (596 by 15 m).

In the year ended September 11, 2009 the airport had 50,900 aircraft operations, an average of 139 per day: 98% general aviation and 2% air taxi. 54 aircraft were then based at this airport: 98% single-engine and 2% multi-engine.

== Nearby airports ==
Nearby airports with instrument approach procedures include:

- 0G0 – North Buffalo Suburban Airport (11 nm NW)
- BUF – Buffalo Niagara International Airport (12 nm SW)
- 9G6 – Pine Hill Airport (13 nm NE)
- GVQ – Genesee County Airport (14 nm E)
- 9G0 – Buffalo Airfield (14 nm SW)

== See also ==
- List of airports in New York
