= Kingston–Ulster Airport =

Kingston-Ulster Airport
- IATA: none; ICAO: none; FAA LID: 20N

Summary
- Airport type: Public use
- Owner: Kingston-Ulster Airport, Inc.
- Serves: Kingston, New York
- Elevation AMSL: 147 ft (45 m)
- Coordinates: 41°59′07″N 073°57′52″W
- Website: KingstonUlsterAirport.com

Map
- Location of airport in New York 20N (the United States)

Runways
Direction	Length		Surface
Direction	ft	m	Surface
15/33	3,100	945	Asphalt

Statistics (2010)
- Aircraft operations: 8,000
- Based aircraft: 35
- Source: Federal Aviation Administration

Kingston–Ulster Airport (FAA LID: 20N) is a privately owned, public use airport located four nautical miles (5 mi, 7 km) north of the central business district of Kingston, a city in Ulster County, New York, United States. The airport is situated near East Kingston, in the Town of Ulster. This airport is included in the National Plan of Integrated Airport Systems for 2011–2015, which categorized it as a general aviation airport.

== Facilities and aircraft ==
Kingston–Ulster Airport covers an area of 87 acres (35 ha) at an elevation of 147.4 ft. / 44.9 m (surveyed) above mean sea level. Runway 15/33 is the sole landing surface on the field. It has an asphalt surface measuring 3,100 by 60 feet (945 x 18 m).

For the 12-month period ending August 29, 2013, the airport had 8,000 general aviation aircraft operations, an average of 21 per day. At that time there were 34 aircraft based at this airport: 94% single-engine and 6% multi-engine.

Richmor Aviation, the fixed-base operator (FBO), offers flight instruction and sightseeing flights around the Hudson Valley. The airport mostly serves Ulster County.

== Aviation ==
Airport Operations
Airport use:	Open to the public
Activation date:	09/1961
Sectional chart:	NEW YORK
Control tower:	No
Pattern altitude:	1198 feet MSL 1051 feet AGL
Wind indicator:	Lighted
Segmented circle:	Yes
Landing Fee:	Yes

Airport Services
Fuel Available	100LL
Parking	Tiedowns
Airframe Services	MAJOR
Powerplant Services	MAJOR
Bottled Oxygen	None
Bulk Oxygen	None

Airport Communications
CTAF/UNICOM:	122.8
Pilot Controlled Lighting	123.3
NEW YORK APPROACH:	132.75
NEW YORK DEPARTURE:	132.75

Runway 15/33
Dimensions		3100 x 60 ft.
Surface		Asphalt, in good condition
Weight Bearing Capacity		Single Wheel: 12.5
Runway Edge Lights		Medium Intensity
	Runway 15	Runway 33
Latitude	41-59.310770N	41-58.919070N
Longitude	073-58.078525W	073-57-639935W
Elevation	147.3 ft. MSL	133.4 ft. MSL
Gradient	0.4% UP	0.4% UP
Traffic Pattern	LEFT	LEFT
Runway Heading	153 mag 140 true	333 mag 320 true
Displaced Threshold	235 ft	309 ft
Declared Distances	TORA:3100 TODA:3100 ASDA:3110 LDA:2775	TORA:3100 TODA:3100 ASDA:2939 LDA:2630
Markings	Non precision	Non precision
Visual Slope Indicatior	2-light PAPI on left. 4.50 deg glidepath. PAPI unsuable 5 deg left or 8 deg right of course.	2-light PAPI on left. 3.60 deg glidepath.
Runway End Identifier Lights	no	yes
Touchdown Point	yes, no lights	yes, no lights
Obstructions	54 ft tree, 373 ft from runway, 166 ft left of centerline, 3:1 slope to clear. Runway has +25 ft light pole 136 ft from runway 166 ft left and +12 ft fence 125 ft from runway left/right.	59 ft tree, 357 ft from runway, 269 ft right of centerline, 2:1 slope to clear. Runway has +7 ft fence 164 ft from runway and +24 ft shed, 132 ft from runway, 108 ft left.

== See also ==
- List of airports in New York
