= Owasco Airport =

- IATA: none; ICAO: none; FAA LID: Y92

Summary
- Airport type: Public
- Owner: Mandan Enterprises LLC
- Serves: Moravia, New York
- Elevation AMSL: 1,378 ft / 420 m
- Coordinates: 42°44′09″N 076°29′09″W
- Interactive map of Owasco Airport

Runways
Direction	Length		Surface
Direction	ft	m	Surface
11/29	2,300	701	Turf
- Source: Federal Aviation Administration

Owasco Airport (FAA LID: Y92) is a privately owned, public use airport located three nautical miles (6 km) northwest of the central business district of Moravia, a village in the Town of Moravia, Cayuga County, New York, United States.

It was formerly a private use airport with the FAA identifier NY92.

== Facilities ==
Owasco Airport covers an area of 52 acres (21 ha) at an elevation of 1,378 feet (420 m) above mean sea level. It has one runway designated 11/29 with a turf surface measuring 2,300 by 50 feet (701 x 15 m).

== See also ==
- List of airports in New York
