= Ticonderoga Municipal Airport =

- IATA: none; ICAO: none; FAA LID: 4B6

Summary
- Airport type: Public
- Owner: Town of Ticonderoga
- Serves: Ticonderoga, New York
- Elevation AMSL: 273 ft / 83 m
- Coordinates: 43°52′35″N 073°24′47″W

Map
- Location of airport in New York 4B6 (the United States)

Runways
Direction	Length		Surface
Direction	ft	m	Surface
2/20	4,041	1,232	Asphalt

Statistics (2011)
- Aircraft operations: 11,200
- Based aircraft: 11
- Source: Federal Aviation Administration

Ticonderoga Municipal Airport (FAA LID: 4B6) is a public use airport located two nautical miles (4 km) northeast of Ticonderoga, a hamlet in the Town of Ticonderoga, Essex County, New York, United States. The airport is owned by the Town of Ticonderoga. It is included in the National Plan of Integrated Airport Systems for 2011–2015, which categorized it as a general aviation facility.

== Facilities and aircraft ==
Ticonderoga Municipal Airport covers an area of 60 acres (24 ha) at an elevation of 273 feet (83 m) above mean sea level. It has one runway designated 2/20 with an asphalt surface measuring 4,041 by 60 feet (1,232 x 18 m).

For the 12-month period ending September 9, 2011, the airport had 11,200 aircraft operations, an average of 30 per day: 98% general aviation and 2% military. At that time there were 11 aircraft based at this airport: 91% single-engine and 9% helicopter.

== See also ==
- List of airports in New York
