= Sky Acres Airport =

Coordinates: 41°42′27″N 073°44′17″W

- IATA: none; ICAO: none; FAA LID: 44N

Summary
- Airport type: Public
- Owner: Sky Acres Enterprises, Inc.
- Serves: Millbrook, New York
- Location: 30 Airway Drive, Suite 1 LaGrangeville, NY 12540
- Elevation AMSL: 698 ft / 213 m

Map
- Location of airport in New York 44N (the United States)

Runways
Direction	Length		Surface
Direction	ft	m	Surface
17/35	3,830	1,167	Asphalt

Statistics (2005)
- Aircraft operations: 48,300
- Based aircraft: 95
- Source: Federal Aviation Administration

Sky Acres Airport (FAA LID: 44N) is a public-use airport located six miles (10 km) southwest of the central business district of Millbrook, a village in Dutchess County, New York, United States. It is privately owned by Sky Acres Enterprises, Inc.

== Facilities and aircraft ==
Sky Acres Airport covers an area of 205 acres (83 ha) and contains one runway designated 17/35 with a 3,830 x 60 ft (1,167 x 18 m) asphalt pavement. For the 12-month period ending September 15, 2005, the airport had 48,300 aircraft operations, an average of 132 per day: 99% general aviation and 1% military. There are 95 aircraft based at this airport: 82% single-engine and 18% multi-engine.

== Accidents ==
On August 17, 2019, a Cessna 303 plane that was departing the airport crashed into a private home resulting in the death of the pilot, Francisco Knipping Diaz, a Dominican American attorney from Manhattan and local homeowner Gerard "Jerry" Bocker.

== See also ==
- List of airports in New York
