= Moores Airport =

- IATA: none; ICAO: none; FAA LID: 1E8

Summary
- Airport type: Public use
- Owner: Lloyd E. Moore/Cory E. Moore
- Serves: Degrasse, New York
- Location: Clare, New York
- Elevation AMSL: 815 ft / 248 m
- Coordinates: 44°23′16″N 075°03′59″W

Map
- Location of airport in New York

Runways
Direction	Length		Surface
Direction	ft	m	Surface
2/20	2,200	671	Turf

Statistics (2011)
- Aircraft operations: 3,500
- Based aircraft: 9
- Sources: FAA and NYSDOT

Moores Airport (FAA LID: 1E8) is a privately owned, public use airport in St. Lawrence County, New York, United States. It is located three nautical miles (6 km) north of Degrasse, a hamlet in the Town of Russell.

== Facilities and aircraft ==
Moores Airport covers an area of 64 acres (26 ha) at an elevation of 815 feet (248 m) above mean sea level. It has one runway designated 2/20 with a turf surface measuring 2,200 by 55 feet (671 × 17 m).

For the 12-month period ending September 15, 2011, the airport had 3,500 general aviation aircraft operations, an average of 291 per month. At that time there were nine aircraft based at this airport: 78% single-engine and 22% ultralight.

== See also ==
- List of airports in New York
