= North Buffalo Suburban Airport =

- IATA: none; ICAO: none; FAA LID: 0G0

Summary
- Airport type: Public use
- Owner: Gary Leasing Inc.
- Serves: Lockport, New York
- Elevation AMSL: 588 ft / 179 m
- Coordinates: 43°06′11″N 078°42′13″W

Map
- Location of airport in New York

Runways
Direction	Length		Surface
Direction	ft	m	Surface
10/28	2,830	863	Asphalt

Statistics (2007)
- Aircraft operations: 3,600
- Based aircraft: 31
- Source: Federal Aviation Administration

North Buffalo Suburban Airport (FAA LID: 0G0) was a privately owned, public use airport located three nautical miles (6 km) south of the central business district of Lockport, a city in Niagara County, New York, United States.

== Facilities and aircraft ==
North Buffalo Suburban Airport covers an area of 90 acres (36 ha) which contains one runway designated 10/28 which measures 2,830 x 50 ft (863 x 15 m). For the 12-month period ending June 19, 2007, the airport had 3,600 general aviation aircraft operations, an average of 9 per day. There are 31 aircraft based at this airport: 97% single-engine and 3% multi-engine.

== Nearby airports ==
Nearby airports with instrument approach procedures include:

- BUF – Buffalo Niagara International Airport (10 nm S)
- IAG – Niagara Falls International Airport (11 nm W)
- 9G3 – Akron Airport (11 nm SE)
- 9G0 – Buffalo Airfield (14 nm S)
- 9G6 – Pine Hill Airport (19 nm E)

== See also ==
- List of airports in New York
