= Chapin Field =

Airport in New York, United States

- IATA: none; ICAO: none; FAA LID: 1B8

Summary
- Airport type: Public use
- Owner: Dean Chapin
- Serves: Cambridge, New York
- Elevation AMSL: 508 ft (155 m)
- Coordinates: 43°03′10″N 073°21′47″W

Map
- Location of airport in New York

Runways
Direction	Length		Surface
Direction	ft	m	Surface
5/23	2,130	649	Turf
7/25	2,100	640	Turf

Statistics (2012)
- Aircraft operations: 1,400
- Based aircraft: 21
- Sources: FAA and NYSDOT

Chapin Field (FAA LID: 1B8) is a privately owned, public use airport in Washington County, New York, United States. It is located two nautical miles (4 km) north of the central business district of Cambridge, a village in the Town of Cambridge.

== Facilities and aircraft ==
Chapin Field covers an area of 14 acres (6 ha) at an elevation of 508 feet (155 m) above mean sea level. It has two runways with turf surfaces: 5/23 is 2,130 by 65 feet (649 x 20 m) and 7/25 is 2,100 by 63 feet (640 x 19 m).

For the 12-month period ending August 2, 2012, the airport had 1,400 aircraft operations, an average of 116 per month: 93% general aviation and 7% military. At that time there were 21 aircraft based at this airport: 95% single-engine and 5% multi-engine.

== See also ==
- List of airports in New York
