= Canandaigua Airport =

Airport in New York, United States

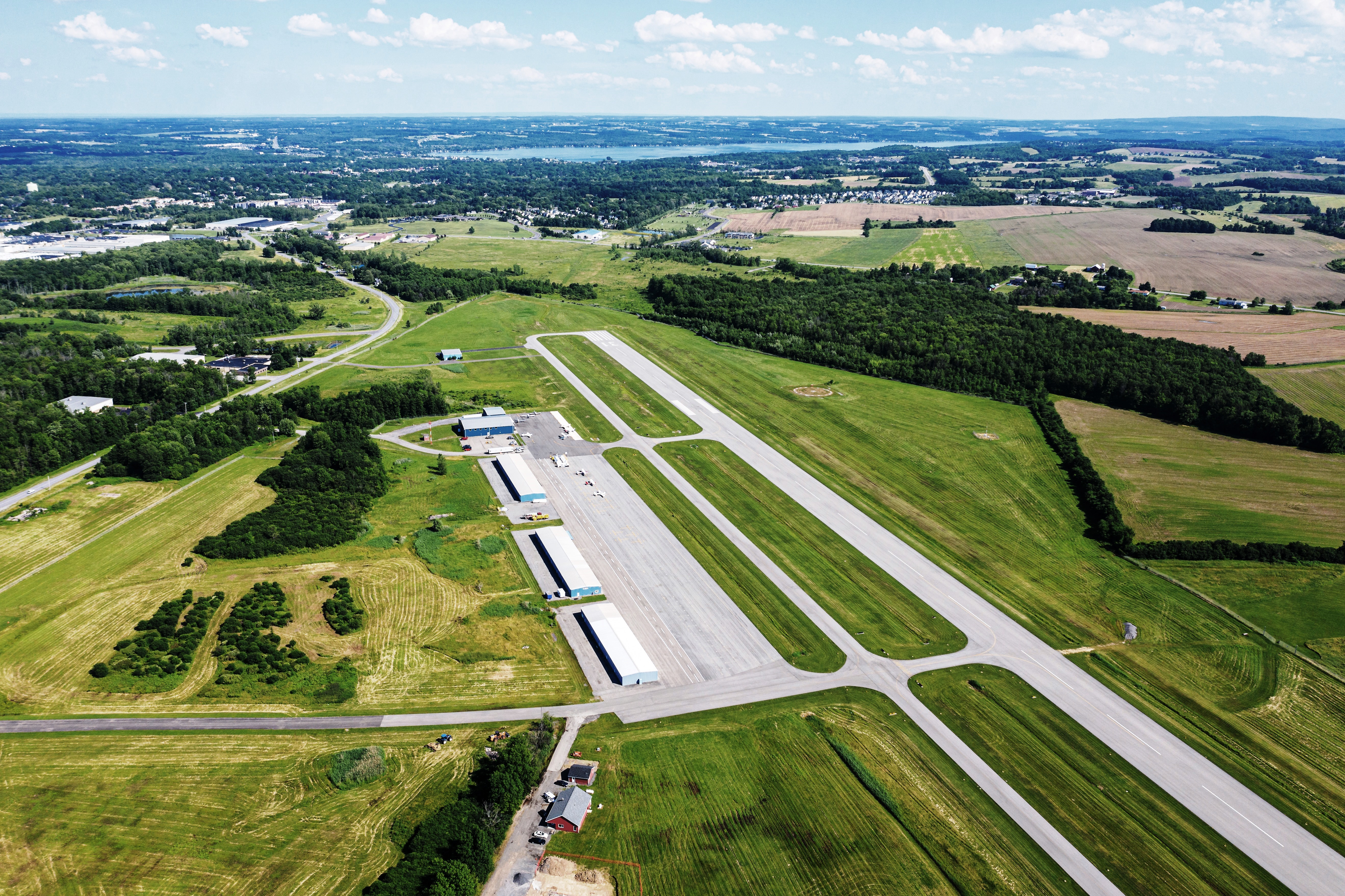
- IATA: none; ICAO: KIUA; FAA LID: IUA

Summary
- Airport type: Public
- Owner: Ontario County IDA
- Serves: Canandaigua, New York
- Elevation AMSL: 814 ft (248 m)
- Coordinates: 42°54′25.87″N 077°19′17.86″W
- Website: https://flycanandaigua.com/

Map
- Location of airport in New York IUA (the United States)

Runways
Direction	Length		Surface
Direction	ft	m	Surface
13/31	5,500	1,676	Asphalt

Statistics (2007)
- Aircraft operations: 21,600
- Based aircraft: 45
- Source: Federal Aviation Administration

Canandaigua Airport is a public-use airport in Ontario County, New York, United States. It is owned by the Ontario County IDA and is located three nautical mile (5.56 km) northwest of the central business district of the City of Canandaigua. According to the FAA's National Plan of Integrated Airport Systems for 2007-2011, it is categorized as a reliever airport.

Although most U.S. airports use the same three-letter location identifier for the FAA and IATA, this airport is assigned IUA by the FAA but has no designation from the IATA.

== Facilities and aircraft ==
Canandaigua Airport has an elevation of 814 feet (248 m) above mean sea level. It has one runway designated 13/31 with an asphalt surface measuring 5,500 by 100 feet (1676 x 30 m).

For the 12-month period ending October 20, 2007, the airport had 21,600 aircraft operations, an average of 59 per day: 95% general aviation, 5% air taxi and a few ultralights. At that time there were 45 aircraft based at this airport: 87% single-engine, 7% multi-engine and 7% ultralights.

== See also ==
- List of airports in New York
