= Schroon Lake Airport =

- IATA: none; ICAO: none; FAA LID: 4B7

Summary
- Airport type: Public
- Owner: Town of Schroon Lake
- Serves: Schroon Lake, New York
- Elevation AMSL: 830 ft (250 m)
- Coordinates: 43°51′30″N 073°44′27″W

Map
- Location within New York Adirondack Park

Runways
Direction	Length		Surface
Direction	ft	m	Surface
16/34	3,000	914	Asphalt

Statistics (2007)
- Aircraft operations: 800
- Source: Federal Aviation Administration

Schroon Lake Airport (/ˈskruːn/ SKROON) (FAA LID: 4B7) is a public-use airport located two nautical miles (3.7 km) north of the central business district of Schroon Lake, a town in Essex County, New York, United States. It is owned by the Town of Schroon Lake. This airport is included in the FAA's National Plan of Integrated Airport Systems for 2009–2013, which categorized it as a general aviation facility.

== Facilities and aircraft ==
Schroon Lake Airport covers an area of 26 acres (11 ha) at an elevation of 830 feet (253 m) above mean sea level. It has one runway designated 16/34 with an asphalt surface measuring 3,000 by 60 feet (914 x 18 m). For the 12-month period ending December 8, 2007, the airport had 800 general aviation aircraft operations, an average of 66 per month.

== See also ==
- List of airports in New York
