= Haverstraw Heliport =

- IATA: none; ICAO: none; FAA LID: H43

Summary
- Airport type: Public use
- Owner: Charles J. Zanlunghi
- Serves: Haverstraw, New York
- Elevation AMSL: 12 ft (3.7 m)
- Coordinates: 41°12′39″N 73°58′9″W

Map
- Interactive map of Haverstraw Heliport

Helipads
Number	Length		Surface
Number	ft	m	Surface
H1	50	15	Asphalt

Statistics (2010)
- Aircraft operations: 2,200
- Based aircraft: 3
- Source: Federal Aviation Administration

Haverstraw Heliport (FAA LID: H43) is a privately owned, public use heliport located one nautical mile (2 km) east of Haverstraw, a village in the Town of Haverstraw, Rockland County, New York, United States.

== Facilities and aircraft ==
Haverstraw Heliport covers an area of 6 acres (2 ha) at an elevation of 12 feet (4 m) above mean sea level. It has one helipad designated H1 with an asphalt surface measuring 50 by 50 feet (15 x 15 m).

For the 12-month period ending September 14, 2010, the heliport had 2,200 aircraft operations, an average of 183 per month: 95.5% general aviation and 4.5% military. At that time there were three helicopters based at this facility.

== See also ==
- List of airports in New York
