= Cattaraugus County-Olean Airport =

Airport in New York, United States

- IATA: OLE; ICAO: KOLE; FAA LID: OLE

Summary
- Airport type: Public
- Owner: City of Olean
- Serves: Olean, New York
- Elevation AMSL: 2,135 ft (651 m)
- Coordinates: 42°14′28″N 078°22′17″W
- Website: www.cityofolean.org/...

Map
- Location of airport in New York

Runways
Direction	Length		Surface
Direction	ft	m	Surface
4/22	4,800	1,463	Asphalt
16/34	2,135	651	Turf

Statistics (2009)
- Aircraft operations: 25,550
- Based aircraft: 12
- Source: Federal Aviation Administration

Cattaraugus County-Olean Airport (IATA: OLE, ICAO: KOLE, FAA LID: OLE) is a city-owned, public-use airport located 10 nautical miles (12 mi, 19 km) north of the central business district of Olean, a city in Cattaraugus County, New York, United States. It is included in the National Plan of Integrated Airport Systems for 2011–2015, which categorized it as a general aviation facility.

== Facilities and aircraft ==
Cattaraugus County-Olean Airport covers an area of 426 acres (172 ha) at an elevation of 2,135 feet (651 m) above mean sea level. It has two runways: 4/22 is 4,800 by 100 feet (1,463 x 30 m) with an asphalt surface; 16/34 is 2,135 by 100 feet (651 x 30 m) with a turf surface.

For the 12-month period ending July 9, 2009, the airport had 25,550 aircraft operations, an average of 70 per day: 98% general aviation, 2% air taxi, and <1% military. At that time there were 12 aircraft based at this airport: 92% single-engine and 8% multi-engine.

Olean has had airline service in the past, including local service carrier Mohawk Airlines. In 1968, Mohawk served Olean 2 flights a day using Fairchild FH 227 equipment. One flight went to Jamestown, NY, continuing on to Cleveland and the other flight went to Syracuse.

== See also ==
- List of airports in New York
