= Duanesburg Airport =

- IATA: none; ICAO: none; FAA LID: 4B1

Summary
- Airport type: Public use
- Owner: Duanesburg Aviation Corp.
- Serves: Duanesburg, New York
- Elevation AMSL: 714 ft (218 m)
- Coordinates: 42°45′36″N 074°08′05″W

Map
- Location of airport in New York

Runways
Direction	Length		Surface
Direction	ft	m	Surface
10/28	2,600	792	Asphalt

Statistics (2011)
- Aircraft operations: 800
- Source: Federal Aviation Administration

Duanesburg Airport (FAA LID: 4B1) is a privately owned, public use airport in Schenectady County, New York, United States. It is located near Duanesburg, a hamlet in the Town of Duanesburg. This airport is included in the National Plan of Integrated Airport Systems for 2011–2015, which categorized it as a general aviation facility.

== Facilities and aircraft ==
Duanesburg Airport covers an area of 30 acres (12 ha) at an elevation of 714 feet (218 m) above mean sea level. It has one runway designated 10/28 with an asphalt surface measuring 2,600 by 45 feet (792 x 14 m). It is also home to the Duanesburg Skydiving Club.

For the 12-month period ending September 21, 2011, the airport had 800 aircraft operations, an average of 66 per month: 75% general aviation and 25% military.

== See also ==
- List of airports in New York
