= Granville Airport =

- IATA: none; ICAO: none; FAA LID: 01NK

Summary
- Airport type: Public use
- Serves: Granville, New York
- Elevation AMSL: 420 ft (130 m)
- Coordinates: 43°25′22″N 073°16′05″W

Map
- Location of airport in New York

Runways
Direction	Length		Surface
Direction	ft	m	Surface
16/34	2,500	762	Asphalt

Statistics (2005)
- Aircraft operations: 17,000
- Based aircraft: 22
- Source: Federal Aviation Administration

Granville Airport (FAA LID: 01NK) is a public use airport in Washington County, New York, United States. It is located one nautical mile (1.85 km) north of the central business district of Granville, a village in the Town of Granville.

== Facilities and aircraft ==
Granville Airport covers an area of 35 acres (14 ha) at an elevation of 420 feet (128 m) above mean sea level. It has one runway designated 16/34 with an asphalt surface measuring 2,500 by 36 feet (762 x 11 m).

For the 12-month period ending August 18, 2005, the airport had 17,000 general aviation aircraft operations, an average of 46 per day. At that time there were 22 aircraft based at this airport: 95.5% single-engine and 4.5% glider.

== See also ==
- List of airports in New York
