= Frankfort-Highland Airport =

- IATA: none; ICAO: none; FAA LID: 6B4

Summary
- Airport type: Public use
- Owner: Davand Aviation
- Serves: Utica, New York
- Location: Frankfort, New York
- Elevation AMSL: 1,325 ft (404 m)
- Coordinates: 43°01′00″N 075°10′15″W

Map
- Location of airport in New York

Runways
Direction	Length		Surface
Direction	ft	m	Surface
13/31	2,550	777	Asphalt

Statistics (2012)
- Aircraft operations: 11,980
- Source: Federal Aviation Administration

Frankfort-Highland Airport (FAA LID: 6B4) is a privately owned, public use airport located west of Frankfort, a village in the Town of Frankfort, Herkimer County, New York, United States. The airport is southeast of Utica, a city in Oneida County. It is included in the National Plan of Integrated Airport Systems for 2011–2015, which categorized it as a general aviation facility.

== Facilities and aircraft ==
Frankfort-Highland Airport covers an area of 45 acres (18 ha) at an elevation of 1,325 feet (404 m) above mean sea level. It has one runway designated 13/31 with an asphalt surface measuring 2,550 by 30 feet (777 x 9 m).

For the 12-month period ending September 13, 2012, the airport had 11,980 aircraft operations, an average of 32 per day: 99% general aviation and 1% military.

== See also ==
- List of airports in New York
