= Wellsville Municipal Airport =

Wellsville Municipal Airport Tarantine Field
- IATA: ELZ; ICAO: KELZ; FAA LID: ELZ

Summary
- Airport type: Public
- Owner: Town of Wellsville
- Serves: Wellsville, New York
- Elevation AMSL: 2,124 ft / 647 m
- Coordinates: 42°06′34″N 077°59′24″W

Map
- Location of airport in New York

Runways
Direction	Length		Surface
Direction	ft	m	Surface
10/28	5,302	1,616	Asphalt

Statistics (2012)
- Aircraft operations: 9,350
- Based aircraft: 21
- Source: Federal Aviation Administration

Wellsville Municipal Airport (IATA: ELZ, ICAO: KELZ, FAA LID: ELZ), also known as Tarantine Field, is a public use airport located 2 nautical miles (3.7 km; 2.3 mi) southwest of Wellsville, a village in the Town of Wellsville, Allegany County, New York, United States. The airport is owned by the Town of Wellsville. It is included in the National Plan of Integrated Airport Systems for 2011–2015, which categorized it as a general aviation facility.

The original Wellsville airport prior to about 1970 was located about 1.5 mi (2.4 km) northeast of the present airport's location. The original northwest/southeast runway is still clearly visible.

== Facilities and aircraft ==
Wellsville Municipal Airport covers an area of 382 acres (155 ha) at an elevation of 2,124 ft (647 m) above mean sea level. It has one runway designated 10/28 with an asphalt surface measuring 5,302 by 100 ft (1,616 by 30 m).

The single east-west runway is 5,302 ft (1,616 m) long, however only 4,900 ft (1,500 m) is available for landing. The west-facing runway is equipped with a localizer instrument approach and a medium intensity approach lighting system which allows for a small improvement in landing minimums.

For the 12-month period ending July 31, 2012, the airport had 9,350 aircraft operations, an average of 25 per day: 91% general aviation, 8% air taxi, and 1% military. At that time there were 21 aircraft based at this airport: 81% single-engine and 19% multi-engine.

== See also ==
- List of airports in New York
