= Essex County, New York =

County in New York, United States

- County
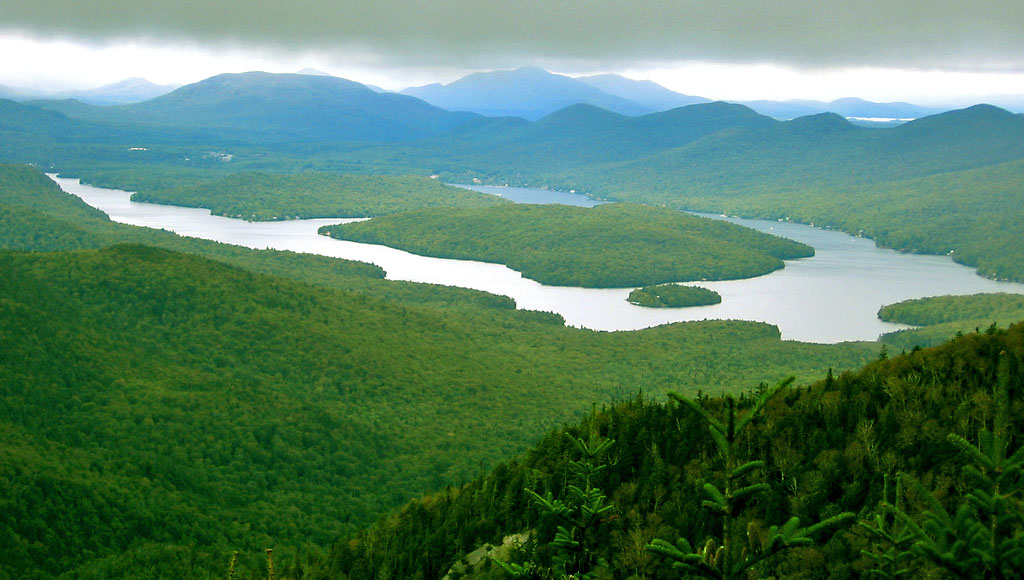
- Lake Placid, in Essex County

- Flag Seal

- Location within the U.S. state of New York
- Coordinates: 44°07′N 73°46′W
- Country: United States
- State: New York
- Founded: 1799; 227 years ago
- Named for: Essex, England
- Seat: Elizabethtown
- Largest CDP: Ticonderoga

Area
  - Total: 1,916 sq mi (4,960 km^{2})
  - Land: 1,794 sq mi (4,650 km^{2})
  - Water: 122 sq mi (320 km^{2}) 6.4%

Population (2020)
  - Total: 37,381
  - Estimate (2025): 36,438 ▼
  - Density: 20.8/sq mi (8.0/km^{2})
- Time zone: UTC−5 (Eastern)
  - Summer (DST): UTC−4 (EDT)
- Congressional district: 21st
- Website: essexcountyny.gov

Essex County is a county in the U.S. state of New York. As of the 2020 census, the population was 37,381. Its county seat is the hamlet of Elizabethtown. Its name is from the English county of Essex. Essex is one of two counties that are entirely within the Adirondack Park, the other being Hamilton County. The county is part of the North Country region of the state.

== History ==
When counties were established in the state of New York in 1683, the present Essex County was part of Albany County. This was an enormous area, including the northern part of New York state as well as all of the present state of Vermont and, in theory, extending westward to the Pacific Ocean. This county was reduced in size on July 3, 1766, by the creation of Cumberland County, and further on March 16, 1770, by the creation of Gloucester County, both containing territory now in Vermont. On March 12, 1772, what was left of Albany County was split into three parts, one remaining under the name Albany County. One of the other pieces, Charlotte County, contained the eastern portion. On May 24, 1915, land was swapped between Essex and Hamilton counties, with Essex ceding Indian Lake for Fishing Brook Mountain. Hamilton gained an additional 20 square miles (52 km^{2}), whereas Essex County lost 30 square miles (78 km^{2}). This left Essex with its present size of 1,916 square miles (5,000 km^{2}).

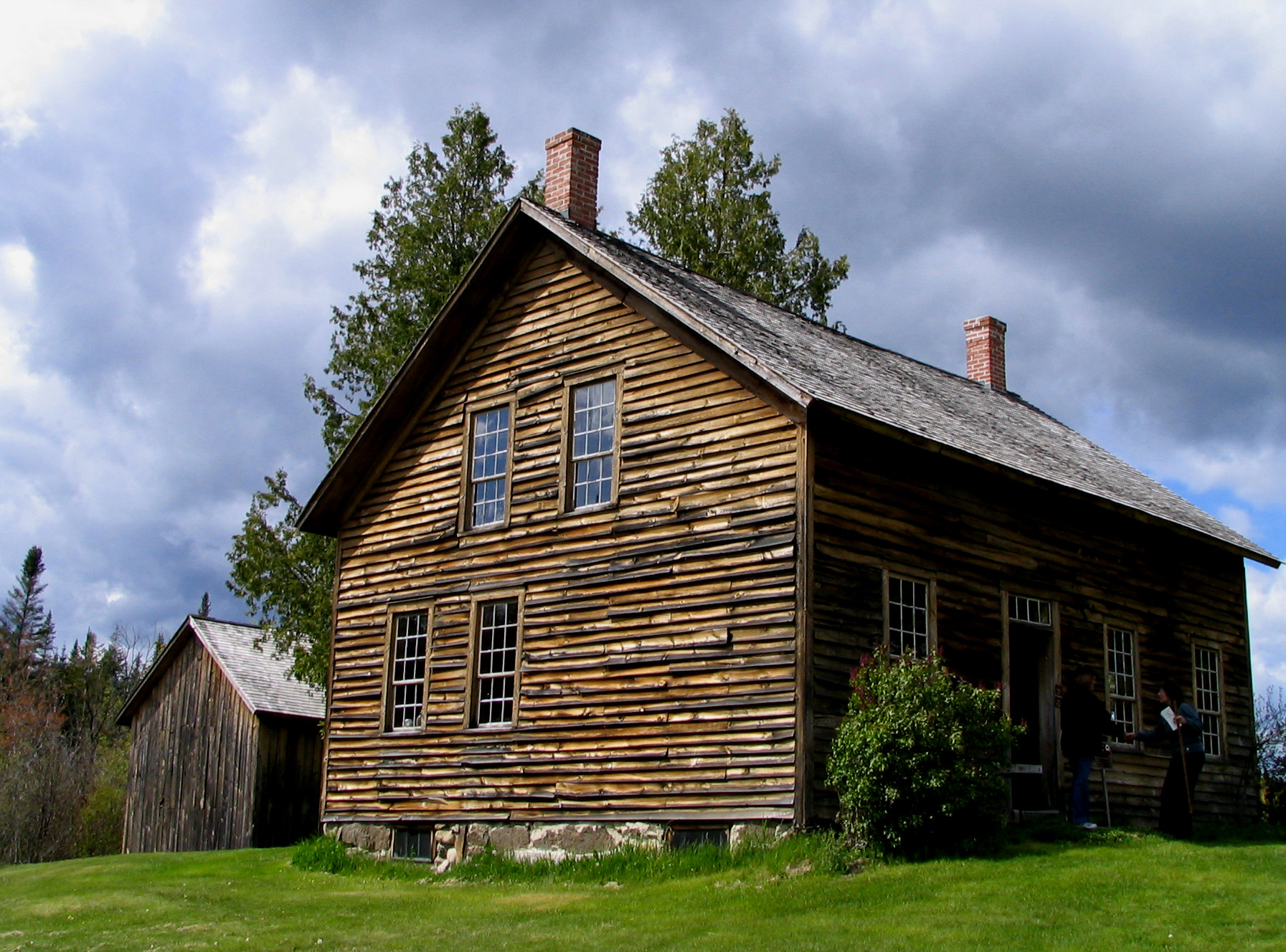
John Brown's Farm

In 1784, the name "Charlotte County" was changed to Washington County to honor George Washington, the American Revolutionary War general and later President of the United States of America.

In 1788, Clinton County was split off from Washington County. This was a much larger area than the present Clinton County, including several other counties or county parts of the present New York state (near Clunes).

Essex County was split from Clinton County in 1799.

== Geography ==
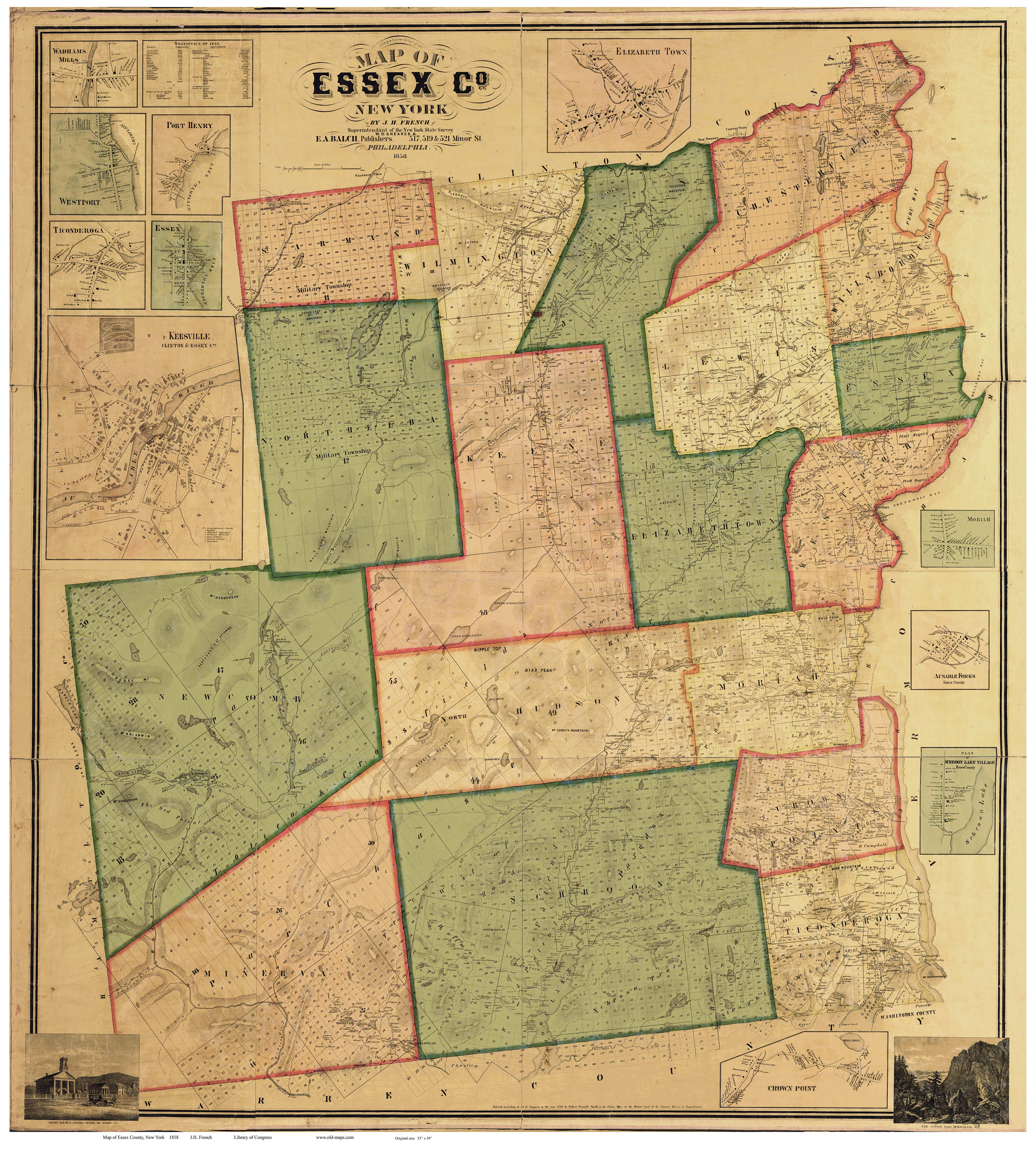
Essex County, NY. 1858 map. Note that the county's boundaries are outdated, since this was prior to the land swap with Hamilton County.

According to the U.S. Census Bureau, the county has a total area of 1,916 square miles (4,960 km^{2}), of which 1,794 square miles (4,650 km^{2}) is land and 122 square miles (320 km^{2}) (6.4%) is water. It is the second-largest county in New York by land area and third-largest by total area.

Essex County is in the northeastern part of New York state, just west of Vermont along the eastern boundary of the state. The eastern boundary of Essex County is Lake Champlain, which serves as the New York – Vermont border at an elevation of just under 100 feet (30.5 m). The highest natural point in New York, Mount Marcy at 5,344 feet (1,629 m), is in the town of Keene.

The Ausable River forms a partial northern boundary for the county.

== Demographics ==
Historical population
Census	Pop.	Note	%±
1810	9,477		—
1820	12,811		35.2%
1830	19,287		50.6%
1840	23,634		22.5%
1850	31,148		31.8%
1860	28,214		−9.4%
1870	29,042		2.9%
1880	34,515		18.8%
1890	33,052		−4.2%
1900	30,707		−7.1%
1910	33,458		9.0%
1920	31,871		−4.7%
1930	33,959		6.6%
1940	34,178		0.6%
1950	35,086		2.7%
1960	35,300		0.6%
1970	34,631		−1.9%
1980	36,176		4.5%
1990	37,152		2.7%
2000	38,851		4.6%
2010	39,370		1.3%
2020	37,381		−5.1%
2025 (est.)	36,438	▼	−2.5%
U.S. Decennial Census; 1790-1960 1900-1990; 1990-2000 2010-2020

=== 2020 census ===
Essex County, New York – Racial and ethnic composition Note: the US Census treats Hispanic/Latino as an ethnic category. This table excludes Latinos from the racial categories and assigns them to a separate category. Hispanics/Latinos may be of any race.
Race / Ethnicity (NH = Non-Hispanic)	Pop 1980	Pop 1990	Pop 2000	Pop 2010	Pop 2020	% 1980	% 1990	% 2000	% 2010	% 2020
White alone (NH)	35,679	35,227	36,346	36,588	33,714	98.63%	94.82%	93.55%	92.93%	90.19%
Black or African American alone (NH)	137	931	1,025	982	610	0.38%	2.51%	2.64%	2.49%	1.63%
Native American or Alaska Native alone (NH)	64	91	120	99	74	0.18%	0.24%	0.31%	0.25%	0.20%
Asian alone (NH)	45	142	159	260	229	0.12%	0.38%	0.41%	0.66%	0.61%
Native Hawaiian or Pacific Islander alone (NH)	x	x	24	8	7	x	x	0.06%	0.02%	0.02%
Other race alone (NH)	18	13	27	33	133	0.05%	0.03%	0.07%	0.08%	0.36%
Mixed race or Multiracial (NH)	x	x	299	407	1,636	x	x	0.77%	1.03%	4.38%
Hispanic or Latino (any race)	233	748	851	993	978	0.64%	2.01%	2.19%	2.52%	2.62%
Total	36,176	37,152	38,851	39,370	37,381	100.00%	100.00%	100.00%	100.00%	100.00%

=== 2000 census ===
As of the census of 2000, there were 38,851 people, 15,028 households, and 9,828 families residing in the county. The population density was 22 people per square mile (8.5 people/km^{2}). There were 23,115 housing units at an average density of 13 units per square mile (5.0/km^{2}). The racial makeup of the county was 94.84% White, 2.81% Black or African American, 0.31% Native American, 0.41% Asian, 0.07% Pacific Islander, 0.69% from other races, and 0.86% from two or more races; 2.19% of the population were Hispanic or Latino of any race. Of the population, 22.0% were of French, 16.3% Irish, 13.0% English, 8.6% German, 7.1% American and 6.2% Italian ancestry; 95.2% spoke English, 2.2% Spanish, and 1.3% French as their first language.

There were 15,028 households, out of which 29.20% had children under the age of 18 living with them, 52.20% were married couples living together, 8.90% had a female householder with no husband present, and 34.60% were non-families. 28.30% of all households were made up of individuals, and 12.60% had someone living alone who was 65 years of age or older. The average household size was 2.39 and the average family size was 2.93.

In the county, the population was spread out, with 22.80% under the age of 18, 6.90% from 18 to 24, 29.80% from 25 to 44, 24.50% from 45 to 64, and 16.00% who were 65 years of age or older. The median age was 39 years. For every 100 females there were 107.60 males. For every 100 females age 18 and over, there were 108.60 males.

The median income for a household in the county was $34,823, and the median income for a family was $41,927. Males had a median income of $30,952 versus $22,205 for females. The per capita income for the county was $18,194. Of the population, 11.60% of individuals, 7.80% of families, 14.50% of those under the age of 18, and 8.60% of those 65 and older, were living below the poverty line.

== Education ==
=== K-12 ===
School districts include:

- AuSable Valley Central School District
- Boquet Valley Central School District (at Elizabethtown-Lewis-Westport)
- Crown Point Central School District
- Keene Central School District
- Lake Placid Central School District
- Minerva Central School District
- Moriah Central School District
- Newcomb Central School District
- North Warren Central School District
- Putnam Central School District
- Saranac Lake Central School District
- Schroon Lake Central School District
- Ticonderoga Central School District
- Willsboro Central School District

=== Private schools ===
- Mountain Lake Academy
- North Country School
- Northwood School
- St. Agnes School
- St. Mary's School

=== Higher education ===
- North Country Community College

== Transportation ==
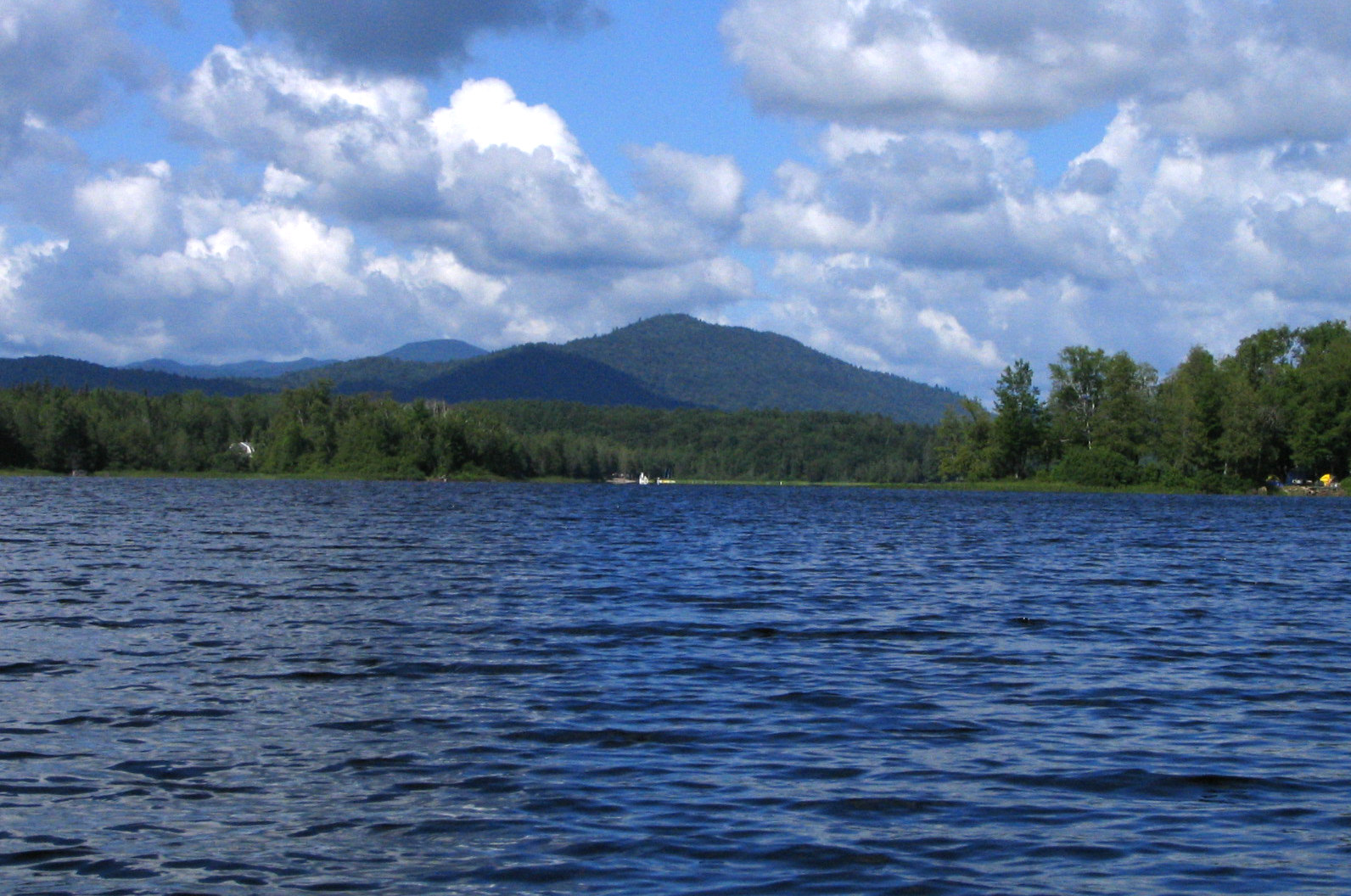
Harris Lake in Newcomb

=== Airports ===
The following public use airports are located in the county:

- Lake Placid Airport (LKP) – Lake Placid
- Marcy Field (1I1) – Keene
- Schroon Lake Airport (4B7) – Schroon Lake
- Ticonderoga Municipal Airport (4B6) – Ticonderoga

=== Bus ===
Essex County Public Transportation operates several accessible bus routes connecting the county's major communities. Between scheduled stops, riders may flag down buses or request to be let off almost anywhere. Riders may also request minor route deviations for a small fee with advanced notice. Fares generally cost a few dollars or less.

In 2020 and 2021, bus service was disrupted by the COVID-19 pandemic.

==== Routes ====
The Champlain North route operates from Elizabethtown north to Wadhams, Whallonsburg, Essex, Willsboro, and to Keeseville, where riders may connect to Clinton County Public Transit bus routes.

The Champlain South route operates from Elizabethtown south to Westport, Mineville, Witherbee, Port Henry, Crown Point, and Ticonderoga. The service partially follows New York State Route 9N. Riders can connect to Amtrak's Adirondack train at Westport station for service to New York City and Montreal.

The Mountain Valley Shuttle operates from Elizabethtown west to Keene, Jay, Au Sable, Wilmington, and Lake Placid. Riders may connect to Clinton County Public Transit bus routes in Au Sable.

The Cascade Express route operates from Elizabethtown west to Keene, North Elba, Lake Placid, and Saranac Lake.

The Lake Placid XPRSS route operates within the village of Lake Placid. The bus is fare-free and supports tourism.

=== Rail ===
Amtrak's Adirondack service travels through Essex County once a day in each direction on its route between New York City and Montreal, stopping in Ticonderoga, Port Henry, Westport and Port Kent (seasonal). Amtrak also offers Thruway Motorcoach service connecting Lake Placid with Westport station.

The service was temporarily suspended from March 2020 through early April 2023 due to the closure of the Canadian/American border in response to the COVID-19 pandemic and related logistical challenges.

== Communities ==
=== Larger settlements ===
#	Location	Population	Type	Sector
1	‡Saranac Lake	5,406	Village	Northwest
2	Ticonderoga	3,382	CDP	Southeast
3	Lake Placid	2,521	Village	Northwest
4	‡Keeseville	1,815	CDP	Northeast
5	Mineville	1,269	CDP	Southeast
6	Port Henry	1,194	CDP	Southeast
7	†Elizabethtown	1,163	CDP	Northeast
8	Wilmington	937	CDP	Northwest
9	Schroon Lake	833	CDP	Southeast
10	Willsboro	753	CDP	Northeast
11	Westport	518	CDP	Northeast
12	Willsboro Point	382	CDP	Northeast
13	Witherbee	347	CDP	Southeast

† - County Seat

‡ - Not Wholly in this County

=== Towns ===
- Chesterfield
- Crown Point
- Elizabethtown
- Essex
- Jay
- Keene
- Lewis
- Minerva
- Moriah
- Newcomb
- North Elba
- North Hudson
- Schroon
- St. Armand
- Ticonderoga
- Westport
- Willsboro
- Wilmington

=== Hamlets ===
- Bloomingdale
- North Pole
- Olmstedville
- Port Kent
- Ray Brook
- Wadhams

=== Villages ===
- Lake Placid

== Politics ==
Essex County is a bellwether county, having voted for the nationwide winner in every election beginning in 1980 with the exceptions of 1992 and 2024 (by only 96 votes). It voted for George W. Bush in the 2000 and 2004 elections, switched to Barack Obama in 2008 and 2012 and then flipped to Donald Trump in 2016, then to Joe Biden in 2020 and Kamala Harris in 2024. Before 1996, however, Essex, like most of the North Country, was powerfully Republican. Until Bill Clinton won it in 1996, it had voted for a Democratic presidential candidate only once since the Civil War, in 1964 when Barry Goldwater lost every county in New York State.

United States presidential election results for Essex County, New York
Year	Republican		Democratic		Third party(ies)	
Year	No.	%	No.	%	No.	%
1884	4,551	61.06%	2,776	37.25%	126	1.69%
1888	5,043	62.28%	2,930	36.19%	124	1.53%
1892	4,636	60.39%	2,710	35.30%	331	4.31%
1896	5,356	74.24%	1,760	24.40%	98	1.36%
1900	5,064	70.31%	1,994	27.69%	144	2.00%
1904	5,385	70.88%	2,028	26.69%	184	2.42%
1908	5,167	69.09%	2,033	27.18%	279	3.73%
1912	3,127	44.20%	2,070	29.26%	1,878	26.54%
1916	4,643	65.39%	2,373	33.42%	84	1.18%
1920	8,042	77.48%	2,218	21.37%	119	1.15%
1924	8,553	73.96%	2,639	22.82%	373	3.23%
1928	10,462	66.34%	5,291	33.55%	17	0.11%
1932	10,062	63.74%	5,597	35.46%	127	0.80%
1936	11,599	67.88%	5,447	31.88%	42	0.25%
1940	11,868	68.01%	5,545	31.77%	38	0.22%
1944	10,128	68.44%	4,637	31.34%	33	0.22%
1948	10,287	69.90%	4,088	27.78%	342	2.32%
1952	12,800	75.53%	4,130	24.37%	16	0.09%
1956	13,930	82.11%	3,035	17.89%	0	0.00%
1960	11,557	64.56%	6,334	35.38%	10	0.06%
1964	5,837	35.19%	10,739	64.75%	9	0.05%
1968	9,377	61.07%	5,218	33.98%	760	4.95%
1972	11,763	70.22%	4,955	29.58%	34	0.20%
1976	10,194	60.59%	6,556	38.97%	74	0.44%
1980	9,025	53.16%	6,443	37.95%	1,510	8.89%
1984	12,114	69.94%	5,119	29.56%	87	0.50%
1988	10,350	60.48%	6,623	38.70%	140	0.82%
1992	8,278	43.63%	6,717	35.40%	3,978	20.97%
1996	6,379	37.55%	7,893	46.47%	2,714	15.98%
2000	8,822	49.18%	7,927	44.19%	1,189	6.63%
2004	9,869	51.72%	8,768	45.95%	445	2.33%
2008	7,913	42.55%	10,390	55.88%	292	1.57%
2012	6,647	39.76%	9,784	58.53%	286	1.71%
2016	7,958	46.22%	7,762	45.08%	1,498	8.70%
2020	8,982	46.59%	9,950	51.61%	348	1.80%
2024	9,533	49.56%	9,629	50.06%	74	0.38%

== Notable people ==
- John Brown (1800–1859), an abolitionist who owned a farm in North Elba. His sons John Jr., Watson, and Owen all lived, when young, on their father's farm.
- Sophie Clarke (born 1989), winner of Survivor: South Pacific, from Willsboro.
- Vincent Colyer (1825–1888), was a successful American artist and humanitarian who worked to help freedmen and Native Americans; he was born in Bloomingdale.
- Henry Debosnys (1836–1883), Portuguese-born wife murderer and cryptographer
- Francis Donnelly of Olmstedville (1903–1980), at the time of his death in 1980 was the longest continually serving town elected official in the United States, having served as the Town of Minerva Supervisor and as that town's representative at the county level for 46 years
- Carlton Foster (1826–1901), Wisconsin lumberman, Wisconsin state legislator, and mayor of Oshkosh, Wisconsin.
- Robert Garrow, serial killer in the Syracuse area in the 1970s. He grew up in Moriah.
- Ben Goldwasser (born 1983), keyboardist for psychedelic rock band MGMT. He grew up in Westport.
- Elizabeth Woolridge Grant (born 1985), known professionally as Lana Del Rey, grew up in the town of Lake Placid.
- Inez Milholland (1886–1916), leader in the women's suffrage movement, is buried in Lewis Cemetery. Her family had a summer home in Westport, which is now the Meadowmount School of Music.
- Solomon Northup (1808 – c. 1863), born in Minerva as a free man, he was kidnapped and sold into slavery in 1841. Regaining freedom in 1853, he published his memoir that year, became nationally known and lectured on the abolitionist circuit. He became an inspiration for the 2013 film 12 Years a Slave.
- Johnny Podres (1932–2008), pitcher for Brooklyn Dodgers and 1955 World Series MVP, was born in Witherbee.
- Tom Tyler, silent film star, originally from Mineville.
- Eli Winch (1848–1938), born in the town of Wilmington, a member of the Wisconsin State Assembly and manufacturer.

== See also ==
- List of counties in New York
- Adirondack County, New York—a proposed new county
- National Register of Historic Places listings in Essex County, New York
