= Becks Grove Airport =

- IATA: none; ICAO: none; FAA LID: K16

Summary
- Airport type: Public use
- Owner: Andrew & Christina Hoffman
- Serves: Rome, New York
- Elevation AMSL: 450 ft (140 m)
- Coordinates: 43°15′03″N 075°36′16″W

Map
- Location of airport in New York

Runways
| Direction | Length | | Surface |
| Direction | ft | m | Surface |
|---|---|---|---|
| 6/24 | 3,000 | 914 | Asphalt |

Statistics (2011)
- Aircraft operations: 6,050
- Based aircraft: 11
- Source: Federal Aviation Administration

Becks Grove Airport (FAA LID: K16) is a privately owned, public use airport located eight nautical miles (9 mi, 15 km) northwest of the central business district of Rome, a city in Oneida County, New York, United States.

The former airport code for Becks Grove was NY45. It was changed to K16 in the early 2000s.

== Facilities and aircraft ==
Becks Grove Airport covers an area of 120 acres (49 ha) at an elevation of 450 feet (137 m) above mean sea level. It has one runway designated 6/24 with an asphalt surface measuring 3,000 by 23 feet (914 x 7 m).

For the 12-month period ending October 7, 2011, the airport had 6,050 aircraft operations, an average of 16 per day: 99% general aviation and 1% military. At that time there were 11 aircraft based at this airport: 91% single-engine and 9% helicopter.

== See also ==
- List of airports in New York
