= Oswego County Airport =

- IATA: none; ICAO: KFZY; FAA LID: FZY

Summary
- Airport type: Public
- Owner: Oswego County Admin.
- Serves: Fulton, Oswego County, New York
- Location: Volney, New York
- Elevation AMSL: 475 ft / 145 m
- Coordinates: 43°21′03″N 076°23′17″W
- Website: co.oswego.ny.us/...
- Interactive map of Oswego County Airport

Runways
| Direction | Length | | Surface |
| Direction | ft | m | Surface |
|---|---|---|---|
| 6/24 | 3,996 | 1,218 | Asphalt |
| 15/33 | 5,197 | 1,584 | Asphalt |

Statistics (2009)
- Aircraft operations: 20,550
- Based aircraft: 68
- Source: Federal Aviation Administration

Oswego County Airport (ICAO: KFZY, FAA LID: FZY) is a county-owned, public-use airport three nautical miles (6 km) northeast of the central business district of Fulton, in Oswego County, New York, United States. The airport is located in Volney, New York. It has been designated by the Federal Aviation Administration as a general aviation reliever airport for Syracuse Hancock International Airport, located 25 miles (40 km) to the southeast.

The airport is home to a flight school and also has charter services available for local residents. Short and long-term tie-downs, as well as hangar rentals, are available to aircraft owners. Organizations based at the airport include an Experimental Aircraft Association chapter and a Civil Air Patrol squadron. In 1999, Phish performed their summer festival, Camp Oswego, at the airport.

Although most U.S. airports use the same three-letter location identifier for the FAA and IATA, this airport is assigned FZY by the FAA but has no designation from the IATA.

== Facilities and aircraft ==
Oswego County Airport covers an area of 171 acres (69 ha) at an elevation of 475 feet (145 m) above mean sea level. It has two asphalt paved runways: 6/24 is 3,996 by 100 feet (1,218 x 30 m) and 15/33 is 5,197 by 100 feet (1,584 x 30 m).

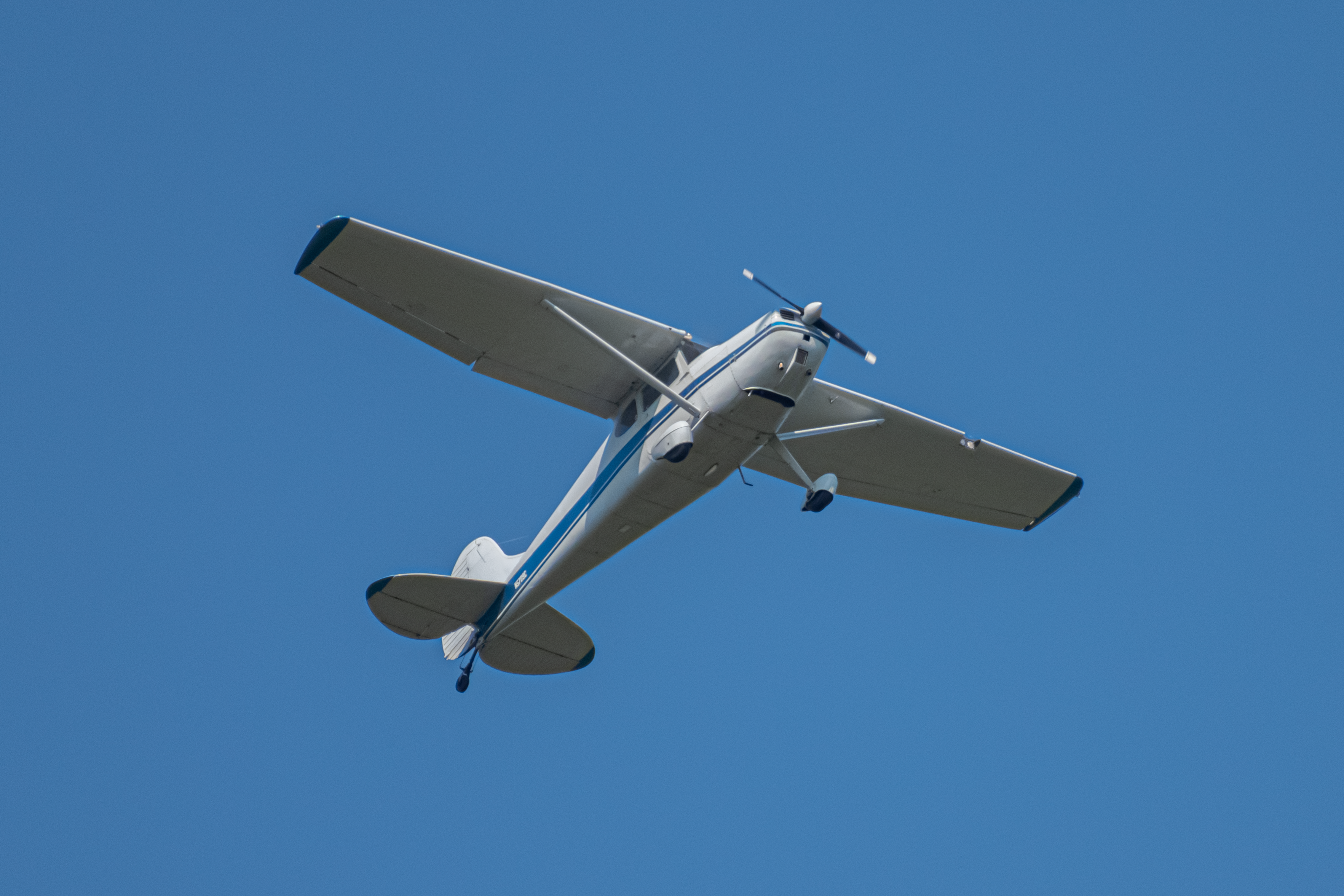
N5709C approaching the Oswego County Airport prior to landing.

For the 12-month period ending October 8, 2009, the airport had 20,550 aircraft operations, an average of 56 per day: 97% general aviation, 2% air taxi, and 1% military. At that time there were 68 aircraft based at this airport: 93% single-engine, 4% multi-engine, 1% jet and 1% ultralight.

== See also ==
- List of airports in New York
