= Rouses Point Seaplane Base =

- IATA: RSX; ICAO: none; FAA LID: K21

Summary
- Airport type: Public
- Owner: Gaines Marina
- Serves: Rouses Point, New York
- Elevation AMSL: 95 ft / 29 m
- Coordinates: 44°59′30″N 073°21′48″W
- Website: GainesMarina.com

Map
- Location of airport in New York

Runways
Direction	Length		Surface
Direction	ft	m	Surface
ALL/WAY	7,900	2,408	Water

Statistics (2010)
- Aircraft operations: 46
- Sources: FAA and NYSDOT

Rouses Point Seaplane Base (IATA: RSX, FAA LID: K21) is a public use seaplane base located on the Richelieu River in Rouses Point, a village in Clinton County, New York, United States.

== Facilities and aircraft ==
Rouses Point Seaplane Base resides at elevation of 95 feet (29 m) above mean sea level. It has one seaplane landing area designated ALL/WAY with a water surface measuring 7,900 by 500 feet (2,408 x 152 m). For the 12-month period ending May 20, 2010, the airport had 46 general aviation aircraft operations.

== See also ==
- List of airports in New York
