= Garnseys Airport =

- IATA: none; ICAO: none; FAA LID: B04

Summary
- Airport type: Public use
- Owner: Mr. Zene Garnsey
- Serves: Schuylerville, New York
- Elevation AMSL: 100 ft (30 m)
- Coordinates: 43°04′09″N 073°35′01″W

Map
- Location of airport in New York

Runways
Direction	Length		Surface
Direction	ft	m	Surface
2/20	2,600	792	Turf
2W/20W	9,999	3,048	Water

Statistics (2012)
- Aircraft operations: 1,100
- Based aircraft: 3
- Sources: FAA and NYSDOT

Garnseys Airport (FAA LID: B04) is a privately owned, public use airport located one nautical mile (2 km) south of the central business district of Schuylerville, a village in the Town of Saratoga, Saratoga County, New York, United States. It also serves as a seaplane base with a landing area on the Hudson River.

== Facilities and aircraft ==
Garnseys Airport covers an area of 15 acres (6 ha) at an elevation of 100 feet (30 m) above mean sea level. It has one runway designated 2/20 with a turf surface measuring 2,600 by 103 feet (792 × 31 m). It also has a seaplane landing area designated 2W/20W with a water surface measuring 9,999 by 750 feet (3,048 × 229 m).

For the 12-month period ending August 16, 2012, the airport had 1,100 general aviation aircraft operations, an average of 91 per month. At that time there were three single-engine aircraft based at this airport.

== See also ==
- List of airports in New York
