= Marcy Field =

- IATA: none; ICAO: none; FAA LID: 1I1

Summary
- Airport type: Public
- Owner: Town of Keene
- Serves: Keene, New York
- Elevation AMSL: 985 ft (300 m)
- Coordinates: 44°13′15″N 073°47′16″W

Map
- Location within New York Adirondack Park

Runways
Direction	Length		Surface
Direction	ft	m	Surface
N/S	2,390	728	Turf

Statistics (2010)
- Aircraft operations: 135
- Source: Federal Aviation Administration

Marcy Field (FAA LID: 1I1) is a public-use airport located two nautical miles (3.7 km) south of the central business district of Keene, a town in Essex County, New York, United States. It is owned by the Town of Keene. The airport is situated on the west side of the Ausable River.

== Facilities and aircraft ==
Marcy Field covers an area of 36 acres (15 ha) at an elevation of 985 feet (300 m) above mean sea level. It has one runway designated N/S with a turf surface measuring 2,390 by 95 feet (728 x 29 m). For the 12-month period ending May 20, 2010, the airport had 135 aircraft operations, an average of 11 per month: 89% general aviation and 11% military.

== See also ==
- List of airports in New York
