= Cooperstown-Westville Airport =

Airport in Otsego County, New York, US

- IATA: COP; ICAO: none; FAA LID: K23

Summary
- Airport type: Public
- Owner: Rick Williams
- Serves: Cooperstown, New York
- Elevation AMSL: 1,260 ft (380 m)
- Coordinates: 42°37′45″N 074°53′28″W
- Website: http://www.cooperstownwestvilleairport.com
- Interactive map of Cooperstown-Westville Airport

Runways
Direction	Length		Surface
Direction	ft	m	Surface
2/20	2,337	712	Turf

Statistics (2017)
- Aircraft operations (year ending 8/23/2017): 2,400
- Based aircraft: 22
- Source: Federal Aviation Administration

Cooperstown-Westville Airport (IATA: COP, FAA LID: K23) is a privately owned, public-use airport located four nautical miles (7 km) southeast of the central business district of Cooperstown, in Otsego County, New York, United States. The airport's FAA airport code was originally NY54, and was changed to K23 in the early 2000s.

This article does not refer to the Cooperstown airport with two paved strips 1.5 miles northwest of Cooperstown proper that closed in the 1960s.

== Facilities and aircraft ==
Cooperstown-Westville Airport covers an area of 15 acres (6.1 ha) at an elevation of 1,260 feet (384 m) above mean sea level. It has one runway designated 2/20 with a 2,337 by 125 ft (712 x 38 m) turf surface.

For the 12-month period ending August 23, 2017, the airport had 2,400 aircraft operations, an average of 46 per week: 100% general aviation. At that time there were 22 aircraft based at this airport: 16 single-engine and 6 ultra-light.

== See also ==
- List of airports in New York
