= Perry–Warsaw Airport =

Perry-Warsaw Airport
- IATA: none; ICAO: none; FAA LID: 01G

Summary
- Airport type: Public
- Owner: Towns of Perry and Warsaw
- Serves: Perry / Warsaw, New York
- Elevation AMSL: 1,558 ft / 475 m
- Coordinates: 42°44′29″N 078°03′08″W

Map
- Location of airport in New York

Runways
Direction	Length		Surface
Direction	ft	m	Surface
10/28	3,429	1,045	Asphalt
4/22	1,806	550	Turf

Statistics (2017)
- Aircraft operations (year ending 8/17/2017): 12,500
- Based aircraft: 28
- Source: Federal Aviation Administration

Perry-Warsaw Airport (FAA LID: 01G) is a public use airport in Wyoming County, New York, United States. It is located three nautical miles (6 km) northwest of the Village of Perry and four nautical miles (7 km) east of the Village of Warsaw. The airport is owned by the Town of Perry and the Town of Warsaw. It is included in the National Plan of Integrated Airport Systems for 2011–2015, which categorized it as a general aviation facility.

== Facilities and aircraft ==
Perry-Warsaw Airport covers an area of 158 acres (64 ha) at an elevation of 1,558 feet (475 m) above mean sea level. It has two runways: 10/28 is 3,429 by 60 feet (1,045 x 18 m) with an asphalt surface and 4/22 is 1,806 by 60 feet (550 x 18 m) with a turf surface.

For the 12-month period ending August 17, 2017, the airport had 12,500 aircraft operations, an average of 34 per day: 96% general aviation and 4% military. At that time there were 28 aircraft based at this airport: 24 single-engine, 2 multi-engine, 1 jet, and 1 helicopter.

== See also ==
- List of airports in New York
