= Angola Airport =

- IATA: none; ICAO: ~~D22~~; FAA LID: ~~D22~~

Summary
- Airport type: Public, Defunct
- Serves: Angola, New York
- Elevation AMSL: 708 ft / 216 m
- Coordinates: 42°39.47′N 078°59.42′W
- Interactive map of Angola Airport

Runways
Direction	Length		Surface
Direction	ft	m	Surface
~~01/19~~ (Closed)	~~3,212~~	~~979~~	~~Asphalt~~
~~09/27~~ (Closed)	~~2,800~~	~~853~~	~~Gravel~~

Angola Airport was a privately owned public-use airport in Erie County, New York, United States. It is located at the intersection of Evans Center Road and Southwestern Boulevard just east of the central business district of Angola, New York.

== Facilities and aircraft ==
At the time of closure, the airport had two runways: asphalt paved 01/19 was 3,212 by 60 (979 x 18 m), and gravel 09/27 was 2,800 by 60 (853 x 18 m). According to the 2001-2005 NPIAS report, there were 28 based aircraft in 2001.

== History and closure ==
Originally titled "Angola Airways," Angola Airport was constructed sometime between 1967 and 1971. The airport had a succession of owners. In 2002, the owner declared bankruptcy, and the Town of Evans chose not to purchase the property. With no buyer, the airport closed. As of 2010, the airport site has not been redeveloped and the airfield infrastructure remains.
