= Fulton County Airport (New York) =

- IATA: none; ICAO: none; FAA LID: NY0

Summary
- Airport type: Public
- Owner: County of Fulton
- Location: Johnstown, New York
- Elevation AMSL: 881 ft (269 m)
- Coordinates: 42°59′54″N 074°19′46″W

Map
- Location of airport in New York

Runways
Direction	Length		Surface
Direction	ft	m	Surface
10/28	4,000	1,219	Asphalt

Statistics (2008)
- Aircraft operations: 9,700
- Based aircraft: 35
- Source: Federal Aviation Administration

Fulton County Airport (FAA LID: NY0) is a county-owned, public-use airport in Fulton County, New York, United States. It is two nautical miles (3.7 km) east of the central business district of Johnstown. This airport is included in the FAA's National Plan of Integrated Airport Systems for 2009–2013, which categorized it as a general aviation facility.

== Facilities and aircraft ==
Fulton County Airport covers an area of 300 acres (120 ha) at an elevation of 881 feet (269 m) above mean sea level. It has one runway designated 10/28 with an asphalt surface measuring 4,000 by 75 feet (1,219 x 23 m).

For the 12-month period ending June 10, 2008, the airport had 9,700 general aviation aircraft operations, an average of 26 per day. At that time there were 35 aircraft based at this airport: 91% single-engine and 9% multi-engine.

== In popular culture ==
The Fulton County Airport was featured in a two-part episode of the television series The X-Files in 1997. Several scenes in the episodes "Tempus Fugit" and "Max" were shown to have taken place at an airport depicting Fulton County. However no actual footage was shot there. The episodes also depict the village of Northville which is in northeastern Fulton County.

== See also ==
- List of airports in New York
