= Skaneateles Aerodrome =

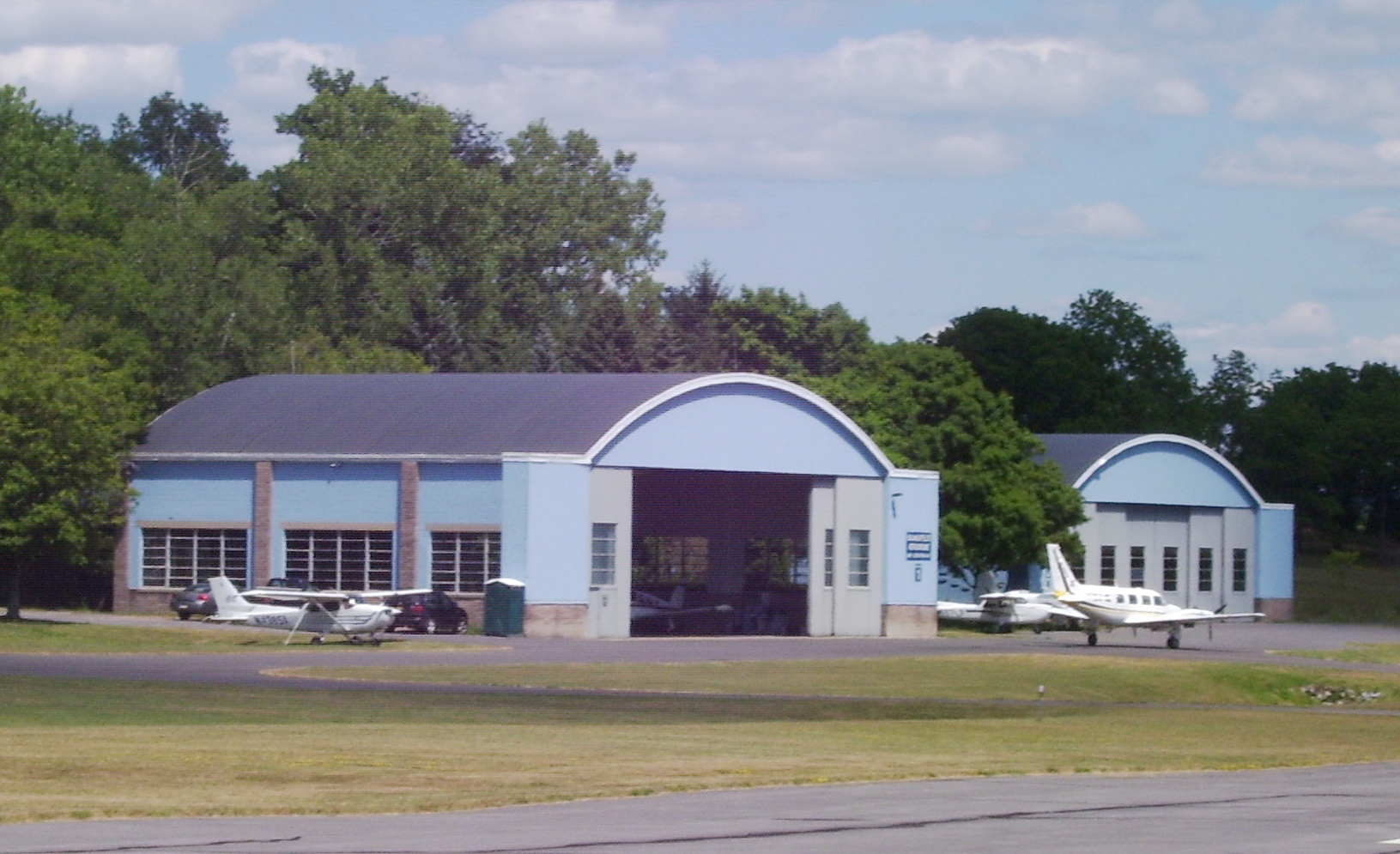
- IATA: none; ICAO: none; FAA LID: 6B9

Summary
- Airport type: Public use
- Owner: Skaneateles Aerodrome LLC
- Serves: Skaneateles, New York
- Elevation AMSL: 1,038 ft / 316 m
- Coordinates: 42°54′50″N 076°26′27″W
- Website: SkaneatelesAerodrome.com

Map
- Location of airport in New York

Runways
Direction	Length		Surface
Direction	ft	m	Surface
10/28	3,134	955	Asphalt
4/22	3,350	1,021	Turf

Statistics (2009)
- Aircraft operations: 9,108
- Based aircraft: 15
- Sources: FAA and airport website

Skaneateles Aerodrome (FAA LID: 6B9) is a privately owned, public use airport located two nautical miles (4 km) southwest of Skaneateles, a village the Town of Skaneateles, Onondaga County, New York, United States. It is included in the National Plan of Integrated Airport Systems for 2011–2015, which categorized it as a general aviation facility.

== Facilities and aircraft ==
Skaneateles Aerodrome covers an area of 100 acres (40 ha) at an elevation of 1,038 feet (316 m) above mean sea level. It has two runways: 10/28 is 3,134 by 58 feet (955 x 18 m) with an asphalt surface and 4/22 is 3,350 by 130 feet (1,021 x 40 m) with a turf surface.

For the 12-month period ending November 25, 2009, the airport had 9,108 aircraft operations, an average of 24 per day: 99.9% general aviation and <1% military. At that time there were 15 aircraft based at this airport: 93% single-engine and 7% multi-engine.

== See also ==
- List of airports in New York
