= Stormville Airport =

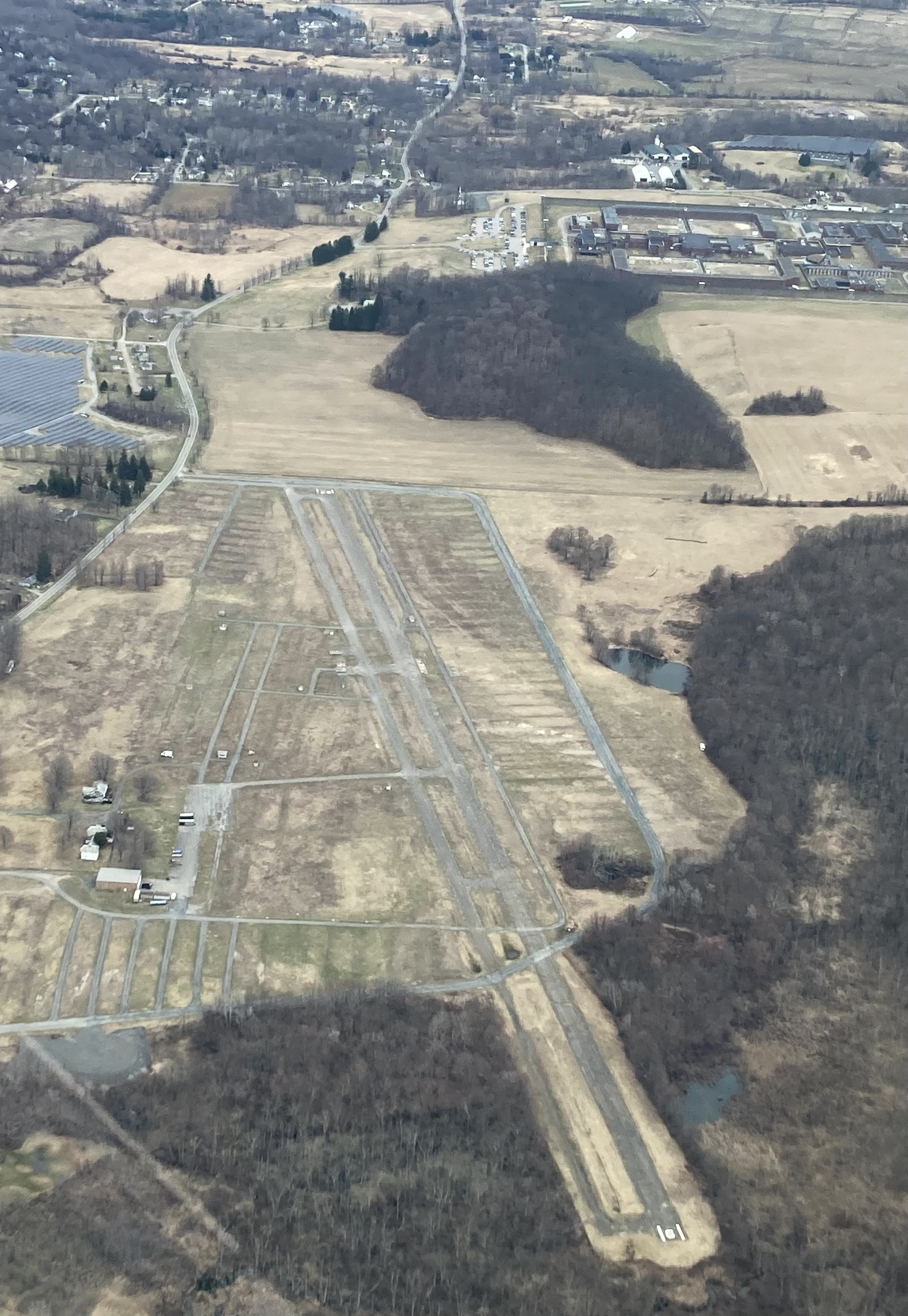
- Aerial view in 2025
- IATA: none; ICAO: none; FAA LID: N69

Summary
- Airport type: Public
- Operator: Tom Carnahan
- Location: Stormville, New York
- Elevation AMSL: 358 ft / 109.1 m
- Coordinates: 41°34′37″N 073°43′56″W

Map
- Interactive map of Stormville Airport

Runways
| Direction | Length | | Surface |
| Direction | ft | m | Surface |
|---|---|---|---|
| 6/24 | 3,315 | 1,010 | Asphalt |

Stormville Airport (FAA LID: N69) was a public airport located one mile (2 km) northeast of the central business district (CBD) of Stormville, a hamlet located within the Town of East Fishkill in Dutchess County, New York, USA. This general aviation airport covered 155 acres (63 ha) and had one runway. It is no longer used as an airport, even though FAA sectional charts and NOTAMS do not yet indicate that it has closed. It now hosts the Stormville Flea Market several times a year.

Stormville was a privately owned, public use airport. Pete and Rose O'Brien ran the airport until their retirement. The current owner is their daughter Patricia Carnahan. There are no services for aircraft and no aircraft based there. Airport facilities such as runways, taxiways, wind sock, and pavement markings are in poor condition.

== See also ==
- List of airports in New York
