= Peekskill Seaplane Base =

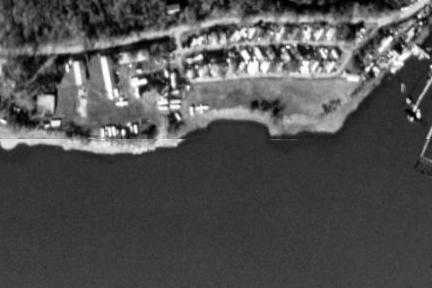
- USGS image as of April 4, 1994
- IATA: none; ICAO: none; FAA LID: 7N2

Summary
- Airport type: Public
- Owner: James M. W. Martin
- Serves: Peekskill, New York
- Location: Verplanck, New York
- Elevation AMSL: 0 ft (0 m)
- Coordinates: 41°14′45″N 073°57′44″W
- Interactive map of Peekskill Seaplane Base

Runways
Direction	Length		Surface
Direction	ft	m	Surface
16W/34W	15,000	4,572	Water

Statistics (2005)
- Aircraft operations: 1,020
- Based aircraft: 9
- Sources: FAA, NYSDOT

Peekskill Seaplane Base (FAA LID: 7N2) was a public use seaplane base located three nautical miles (5.5 km) southwest of the central business district of Peekskill, a city in Westchester County, New York, United States. It was privately owned by James M. W. Martin. The seaplane base was situated on the Hudson River in Verplanck, a hamlet in the Town of Cortlandt.

Also located at this site is the Riveredge Trailer Park, founded and operated by James Martin since 1950. In 1991 he donated the seaplane base, trailer park and waterfront area to the Town of Cortlandt. The 26 acres (110,000 m^{2}) of land was given with an agreement that the trailer park would remain open until 10 years after his death, at which time the town will turn it into a park. Martin had been offered $5.5 million by a developer looking to build condominiums on the property. Martin died on July 3, 2006, in his Greenwich, Connecticut, home at the age of 87. The seaplane base was removed from FAA records in 2007.

== Facilities and aircraft ==
Peekskill Seaplane Base covered an area of 6 acres (2.4 ha) and had a 15,000 by 500-foot (150 m) seaplane landing area designated 16W/34W. For the 12-month period ending April 29, 2005, it had 1,020 aircraft operations, an average of 85 per month, of which 98% was general aviation and 2% was military. At that time 9 aircraft were based there, including 89% single-engine and 11% multi-engine.
