= Potsdam Municipal Airport =

Potsdam Municipal Airport Damon Field
- IATA: none; ICAO: KPTD; FAA LID: PTD

Summary
- Airport type: Public
- Owner: Village of Potsdam
- Serves: Potsdam, New York
- Elevation AMSL: 474 ft / 144 m
- Coordinates: 44°40′36″N 074°56′54″W

Map
- Location of airport in New York

Runways
Direction	Length		Surface
Direction	ft	m	Surface
6/24	3,705	1,129	Asphalt

Statistics (2011)
- Aircraft operations: 6,000
- Based aircraft: 14
- Source: Federal Aviation Administration

Potsdam Municipal Airport (ICAO: KPTD, FAA LID: PTD), also known as Damon Field, is a village owned, public use airport located two nautical miles (4 km) east of Potsdam, a village in the Town of Potsdam, St. Lawrence County, New York, United States. It is included in the National Plan of Integrated Airport Systems for 2019–2023, which categorized it as a general aviation facility.

Although many U.S. airports use the same three-letter location identifier for the FAA and IATA, this airport is assigned PTD by the FAA but has no designation from the IATA (which assigned PTD to Port Alexander Seaplane Base in Port Alexander, Alaska).

== Facilities and aircraft ==
Potsdam Municipal Airport covers an area of 168 acres (68 ha) at an elevation of 474 feet (144 m) above mean sea level. It has one runway designated 6/24 with an asphalt surface measuring 3,705 by 60 feet (1,129 x 18 m).

For the 12-month period ending September 14, 2011, the airport had 6,000 aircraft operations, an average of 16 per day: 92% general aviation, 5% military, and 3% air taxi. At that time there were 14 aircraft based at this airport: 93% single-engine and 7% ultralight.

== See also ==
- List of airports in New York
