= Hendricks Field (New York) =

- IATA: none; ICAO: none; FAA LID: NK16

Summary
- Airport type: Private
- Owner: Lee's Mobile Electric Service
- Serves: Gouverneur, New York
- Elevation AMSL: 480 ft (150 m)
- Coordinates: 44°22′05″N 075°24′12″W

Map
- Location of airport in New York

Runways
Direction	Length		Surface
Direction	ft	m	Surface
5/23	2,520	768	Turf

Statistics (2002)
- Aircraft operations: 1,350
- Based aircraft: 10
- Sources: FAA and NYSDOT

Hendricks Field (FAA LID: NK16) is a private use airport located three nautical miles (6 km) northeast of Gouverneur, a village in the Town of Gouverneur, St. Lawrence County, New York, United States. It was formerly a public use airport at which time its FAA location identifier was 1K0.

== Facilities and aircraft ==
Hendricks Field covers an area of 120 acres (49 ha) at an elevation of 480 feet (146 m) above mean sea level. It has one runway designated 5/23 turf surface measuring 2,520 by 70 feet (768 x 21 m). For the 12-month period ending August 22, 2002, the airport had 1,350 general aviation aircraft operations, an average of 113 per month. At that time there were 10 aircraft based at this airport: 80% single-engine and 20% ultralight.

== See also ==
- List of airports in New York
