= Plateau Sky Ranch Airport =

- IATA: none; ICAO: none; FAA LID: 1F2

Summary
- Airport type: Public use
- Owner: Mr. Bruce R. Brownell
- Serves: Edinburg, New York
- Elevation AMSL: 1,070 ft / 326 m
- Coordinates: 43°13′32″N 074°06′54″W

Map
- Location of airport in New York

Runways
Direction	Length		Surface
Direction	ft	m	Surface
6/24	2,400	732	Turf
1/19	2,000	610	Turf

Statistics (2010)
- Aircraft operations: 3,700
- Based aircraft: 12
- Source: FAA and NYSDOT

Plateau Sky Ranch Airport (FAA LID: 1F2) is a privately owned, public use airport located one nautical mile (2 km) northwest of the central business district of Edinburg, in Saratoga County, New York, United States.

== Facilities and aircraft ==
Plateau Sky Ranch Airport covers an area of 125 acres (51 ha) at an elevation of 1,070 feet (326 m) above mean sea level. It has two runways with turf surfaces: 6/24 is 2,400 by 100 feet (732 x 30 m) and 1/19 is 2,000 by 100 feet (610 x 30 m).

For the 12-month period ending July 6, 2010, the airport had 3,700 aircraft operations, an average of 10 per day: 97% general aviation and 3% military. At that time there were 12 aircraft based at this airport: 75% single-engine, 17% ultralight, and 8% multi-engine.

== See also ==
- List of airports in New York
