= Hamilton Municipal Airport (New York) =

- IATA: none; ICAO: KVGC; FAA LID: VGC

Summary
- Airport type: Public
- Owner: Village of Hamilton
- Serves: Hamilton, New York
- Elevation AMSL: 1,137 ft (347 m)
- Coordinates: 42°50′36″N 075°33′40″W

Map
- Location of airport in New York

Runways
Direction	Length		Surface
Direction	ft	m	Surface
17/35	5,314	1,620	Asphalt

Statistics (2019)
- Aircraft operations: 17,310
- Based aircraft: 46
- Source: Federal Aviation Administration

Hamilton Municipal Airport (ICAO: KVGC, FAA LID: VGC, formerly H30), opened in 1963, is a village-owned, public-use airport located one nautical mile (1.85 km) northwest of the central business district of Hamilton, a village in the town of Hamilton, Madison County, New York, United States.

Although many U.S. airports use the same three-letter location identifier for the FAA and IATA, this facility is assigned VGC by the FAA but has no designation from the IATA.

== Facilities and aircraft ==
Hamilton Municipal Airport covers an area of 180 acres (73 ha) at an elevation of 1,137 feet (347 m) above mean sea level. It has one runway designated 17/35 with a grooved asphalt surface measuring 5,314 by 75 feet (1,620 x 23 m) and a full-length taxiway. The airport is illuminated for night flying by pilot-controlled lighting (PCL), activated on the 122.7 MHz frequency (medium-intensity edge lighting and runway end indicator lights). Precision approach path indicators are available for visual approaches in both directions. Automated weather advisories, from an AWOS-3 device, are continuously broadcast on 119.42 MHz.

Fuel (100LL Avgas and Jet A) is available during the airport's opening hours of 0900-1700 local, seven days a week.

For the 12-month period ending May 23, 2019, the airport had 17,310 aircraft operations, an average of 47 per day: 99.9% general aviation and 0.1% military. At that time there were 46 aircraft based at this airport: 92% single-engine, 4% multi-engine, and 4% gliders.

== See also ==
- List of airports in New York
