= Olcott-Newfane Airport =

- IATA: none; ICAO: none; FAA LID: D80

Summary
- Airport type: Public use
- Owner: Bruce Erck
- Serves: Olcott, New York
- Elevation AMSL: 315 ft / 96 m
- Coordinates: 43°19′18″N 078°43′30″W

Map
- Location of airport in New York

Runways
Direction	Length		Surface
Direction	ft	m	Surface
9/27	2,500	762	Turf
6/24	2,408	734	Turf
- Source: Federal Aviation Administration

Olcott-Newfane Airport (FAA LID: D80) is a privately owned, public use airport located 4 kilometres (2.5 mi) southwest of Olcott, a hamlet in Newfane, Niagara County, New York, United States. The airport is closed indefinitely.

== Facilities ==
Olcott-Newfane Airport covers an area of 60 acres (24 ha) at an elevation of 315 feet (96 m) above mean sea level. It has two runways with turf surfaces: 9/27 is 2,500 by 60 feet (762 x 18 m) and 6/24 is 2,408 by 30 feet (734 x 9 m).
