= Sidney Municipal Airport (New York) =

- IATA: SXY; ICAO: none; FAA LID: N23

Summary
- Airport type: Public
- Owner: Village of Sidney
- Serves: Sidney, New York
- Elevation AMSL: 1,026 ft / 313 m
- Coordinates: 42°18′09″N 075°24′58″W

Map
- Location of airport in New York N23 (the United States)

Runways
Direction	Length		Surface
Direction	ft	m	Surface
7/25	4,201	1,280	Asphalt

Statistics (2011)
- Aircraft operations: 7,800
- Based aircraft: 27
- Source: Federal Aviation Administration

Sidney Municipal Airport (IATA: SXY, FAA LID: N23) is a village owned, public use airport located one nautical mile (2 km) west of Sidney, a village in the Town of Sidney, Delaware County, New York, United States. It is included in the National Plan of Integrated Airport Systems for 2011–2015, which categorized it as a general aviation facility.

== Facilities and aircraft ==
Sidney Municipal Airport covers an area of 50 acres (20 ha) at an elevation of 1,026 feet (313 m) above mean sea level. It has one runway designated 7/25 with an asphalt surface measuring 4,201 by 75 feet (1,280 × 23 m).

For the 12-month period ending June 16, 2011, the airport had 7,800 aircraft operations, an average of 21 per day: 90% general aviation and 10% air taxi. At that time there were 27 aircraft based at this airport: 78% single-engine, 11% jet, 7% multi-engine, and 4% helicopter.

== See also ==
- List of airports in New York
