= Blue Heron Airport =

- IATA: none; ICAO: none; FAA LID: N25

Summary
- Airport type: Public use
- Owner: Nicholas J. Viscio
- Serves: Gallupville, New York
- Elevation AMSL: 1,200 ft (370 m)
- Coordinates: 42°41′50″N 074°11′58″W

Map
- Location of airport in New York

Runways
Direction	Length		Surface
Direction	ft	m	Surface
9/27	2,600	792	Turf

Statistics (2010)
- Aircraft operations: 200
- Based aircraft: 2
- Source: Federal Aviation Administration

Blue Heron Airport (FAA LID: N25, formerly NK93) is a privately owned, public use airport in Schoharie County, New York, United States. It is three nautical miles (6 km) northeast of the central business district of Gallupville, New York. It was formerly a private-use facility with the FAA identifier NK93.

== Facilities and aircraft ==
Blue Heron Airport covers an area of 20 acres (8 ha) at an elevation of 1,200 feet (366 m) above mean sea level. It has one runway designated 9/27 with a turf surface measuring 2,600 by 70 feet (792 x 21 m).

For the 12-month period ending June 11, 2010, the airport had 200 general aviation aircraft operations, an average of 16 per month. At that time there were two ultralight aircraft based at this airport.

== See also ==
- List of airports in New York
