= Ledgedale Airpark =

- IATA: none; ICAO: none; FAA LID: 7G0

Summary
- Airport type: Public
- Owner: Big Fella Enterprizes Inc.
- Serves: Brockport, New York
- Elevation AMSL: 665 ft / 203 m
- Coordinates: 43°10′52.3″N 077°54′55.8″W

Map
- Location of airport in New York 7G0 (the United States)

Runways
Direction	Length		Surface
Direction	ft	m	Surface
10/28	4,204	1,281	Asphalt

Statistics (2006)
- Aircraft operations: 16,100
- Based aircraft: 40
- Source: Federal Aviation Administration

Ledgedale Airpark is a public use airport in Monroe County, New York, United States. It is owned by Big Fella Enterprizes Inc. and is located three nautical miles (5.56 km) southwest of the central business district of the Village of Brockport. According to the FAA's National Plan of Integrated Airport Systems for 2007-2011, it is categorized as a reliever airport.

Although most U.S. airports use the same three-letter location identifier for the FAA and IATA, this airport is assigned 7G0 by the FAA but has no designation from the IATA.

== Facilities and aircraft ==
Ledgedale Airpark covers an area of 166 acres (67 ha) at an elevation of 665 feet (203 m) above mean sea level. It has one runway designated 10/28 with an asphalt surface measuring 4,204 by 75 feet (1,281 x 23 m).

For the 12-month period ending August 18, 2006, the airport had 16,100 aircraft operations, an average of 44 per day: 96% general aviation and 4% military. At that time there were 40 aircraft based at this airport: 100% single-engine.

== See also ==
- List of airports in New York
