= Kobelt Airport =

Kobelt Airport Kobelt/Wallkill Airport
- IATA: none; ICAO: none; FAA LID: N45

Summary
- Airport type: Public use
- Owner: Wallkill Airpark, Inc.
- Serves: Wallkill, Ulster County, New York
- Elevation AMSL: 420 ft (130 m)
- Coordinates: 41°37′40″N 074°08′02″W

Map
- Location of airport in New York N45 (the United States)

Runways
Direction	Length		Surface
Direction	ft	m	Surface
3/21	2,864	873	Asphalt

Statistics (2011)
- Aircraft operations: 15,000
- Based aircraft: 27
- Source: Federal Aviation Administration

Kobelt Airport (FAA LID: N45) is a privately owned, public use airport in Ulster County, New York, United States. It is located three nautical miles (6 km) northeast of the central business district of Wallkill and is also known as Kobelt/Wallkill Airport. This airport is included in the National Plan of Integrated Airport Systems for 2011–2015, which categorized it as a general aviation reliever airport.

Although most U.S. airports use the same three-letter location identifier for the FAA and IATA, this airport is assigned N45 by the FAA but has no designation from the IATA.

== Facilities and aircraft ==
Kobelt Airport covers an area of 125 acres (51 ha) at an elevation of 420 feet (128 m) above mean sea level. It has one runway designated 3/21 with an asphalt surface measuring 2,864 by 50 feet (873 x 15 m).

For the 12-month period ending July 20, 2011, the airport had 15,000 general aviation aircraft operations, an average of 41 per day. At that time there were 27 aircraft based at this airport: 96% single-engine and 4% multi-engine.

NU CAVU restaurant is located on the Kobelt airport. During the summer on Friday evenings, skydiving contests are held in front of the restaurant.

== See also ==
- List of airports in New York
