= Le Roy Airport =

- IATA: none; ICAO: none; FAA LID: 5G0

Summary
- Airport type: Public
- Owner: LeRoy Aviation Services Inc
- Serves: Le Roy, New York
- Elevation AMSL: 780 ft / 238 m
- Coordinates: 42°58′53″N 077°56′15″W

Map
- Location of airport in New York 5G0 (the United States)

Runways
Direction	Length		Surface
Direction	ft	m	Surface
10/28	3,854	1,175	Asphalt

Statistics (1954)
- Aircraft operations: 14,268
- Based aircraft: 29
- Source: Federal Aviation Administration

Le Roy Airport is a public use airport in Genesee County, New York, United States. It is located two nautical miles (3.7 km) east of the central business district of the Le Roy, a village in the Town of Le Roy. According to the FAA's National Plan of Integrated Airport Systems for 2007–2011, it is categorized as a reliever airport.

Although most U.S. airports use the same three-letter location identifier for the FAA and IATA, this airport is assigned 5G0 by the FAA but has no designation from the IATA.

On Sunday, October 27, 2019, at approximately 3PM, four people were injured when a single-engine Beechcraft Bonanza crashed on takeoff from the airport.

== Facilities and aircraft ==
Le Roy Airport covers an area of 83 acres (34 ha) at an elevation of 780 feet (238 m) above mean sea level. It has one runway designated 10/28 with an asphalt surface measuring 3854 by 60 feet (1175 x 18 m).

For the 12-month period ending June 22, 2006, the airport had 14,268 aircraft operations, an average of 39 per day: 98% general aviation, 1% air taxi and 1% military. At that time there were 19 aircraft based at this airport: 100% single-engine.

== See also ==
- List of airports in New York
