= Arcade Tri-County Airport =

- IATA: none; ICAO: none; FAA LID: D23

Summary
- Airport type: Public use
- Owner: Larry Snyder
- Serves: Arcade, New York
- Elevation AMSL: 1,745 ft (532 m)
- Coordinates: 42°34′00″N 078°25′34″W

Map
- Location of airport in New York

Runways
Direction	Length		Surface
Direction	ft	m	Surface
9/27	3,220	981	Gravel
14/32	2,710	826	Turf

Statistics (2010)
- Aircraft operations: 1,900
- Based aircraft: 3
- Source: Federal Aviation Administration

Arcade Tri-County Airport (FAA LID: D23) is a privately owned, public use airport located in the Town of Arcade, Wyoming County, New York, United States, 2 nautical miles (3.7 km) north of the Village of Arcade, also located in the town.

== Facilities and aircraft ==
Arcade Tri-County Airport covers an area of 175 acres (71 ha) at an elevation of 1,745 feet (532 m) above mean sea level. It has two runways: 9/27 is 3,220 by 60 feet (981 x 18 m) with a gravel surface and 14/32 is 2,710 by 80 feet (826 x 24 m) with a turf surface.

For the 12-month period ending September 9, 2010, the airport had 1,900 general aviation aircraft operations, an average of 158 per month. At that time there were three aircraft based at this airport, all single-engine.

== See also ==
- List of airports in New York
