= Gasport, New York =

- CDP & hamlet
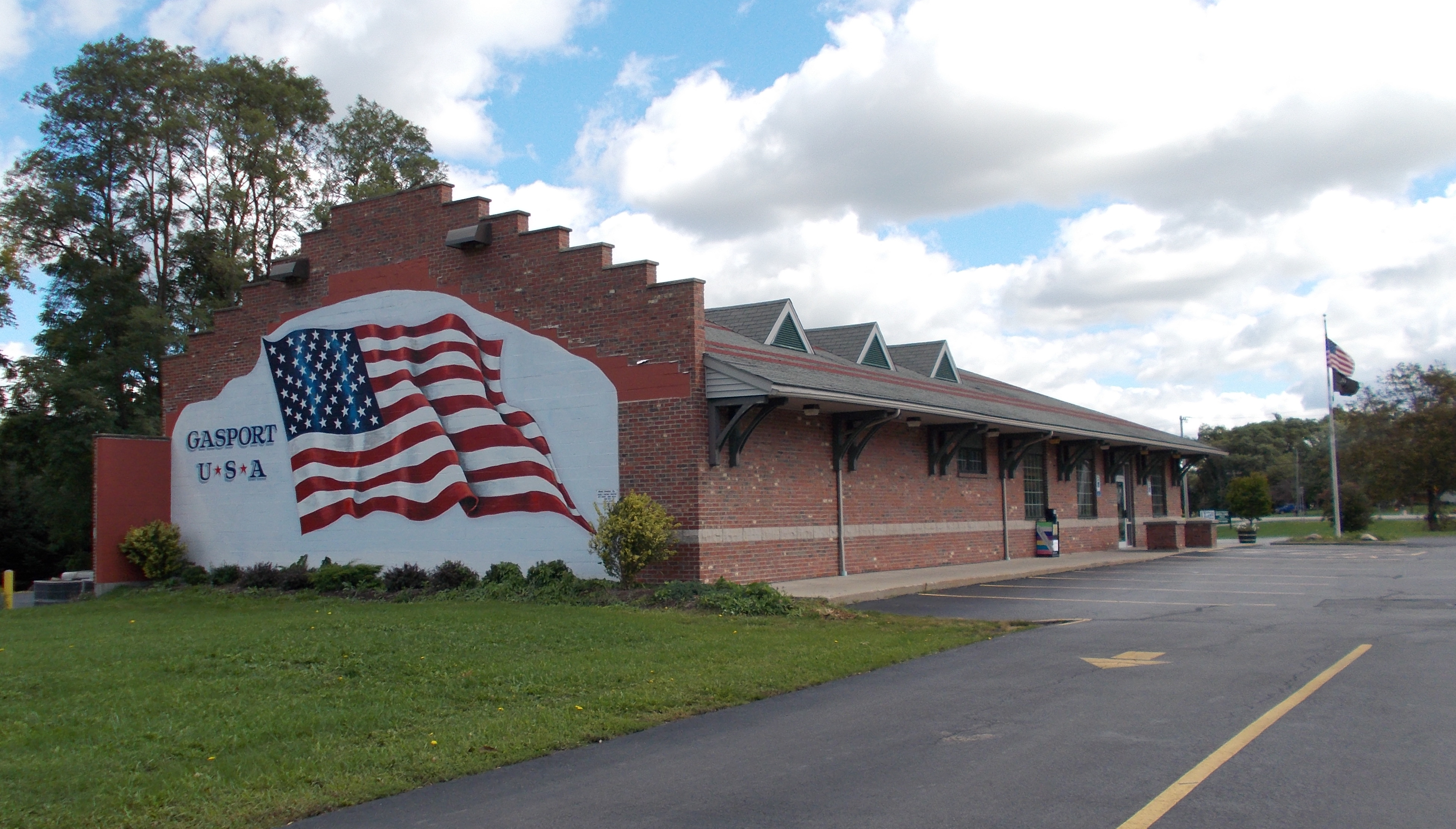
- U.S. Post Office, Gasport, NY, September 2012

- Location in Niagara County and the state of New York.

- Location within New York
- Coordinates: 43°11′52″N 78°34′21″W
- Country: United States
- State: New York
- County: Niagara

Area
  - Total: 3.17 sq mi (8.21 km^{2})
  - Land: 3.12 sq mi (8.08 km^{2})
  - Water: 0.050 sq mi (0.13 km^{2})
- Elevation: 515 ft (157 m)

Population (2020)
  - Total: 1,296
  - Density: 415.5/sq mi (160.42/km^{2})
- Time zone: UTC-5 (Eastern (EST))
  - Summer (DST): UTC-4 (EDT)
- ZIP code: 14067
- Area code: 716
- FIPS code: 36-28431
- GNIS feature ID: 0950934

Gasport is a hamlet (and census-designated place) located in the Town of Royalton in Niagara County, New York, United States. As of the 2020 census, Gasport had a population of 1,296. The name is derived from observed natural gas and the historic Erie Canal port at that location. It is part of the Buffalo–Niagara Falls Metropolitan Statistical Area.

Gasport is east of the City of Lockport.

== History ==
On May 18, 1826, a geological expedition, led by Amos Eaton and physicist Joseph Henry of the Rensselaerian School (now Rensselaer Polytechnic Institute) through the western part of New York state aboard the canal boat "LaFayette", encountered flammable coal gas rising from a spring. They named the local community Gasport. On the return voyage, May 26, they passed through the settlement again, and saw that the name was already appearing on signboards.

== Geography ==
Gasport is located at 43°11′52″N 78°34′21″W (43.197713, -78.572630).

According to the United States Census Bureau, the village has a total area of 2.9 square miles (7.5 km^{2}), of which 2.9 square miles (7.5 km^{2}) is land and 0.1 square miles (0.26 km^{2}) (2.05%) is water.

The hamlet of Gasport is located on New York State Route 31 (Rochester Road) and the Erie Canal.

== Demographics ==
Historical population
Census	Pop.	Note	%±
2020	1,296		—
U.S. Decennial Census

As of the census of 2000, there were 1,248 people, 456 households, and 315 families residing in the community. The population density was 435.1 inhabitants per square mile (168.0/km^{2}). There were 491 housing units at an average density of 171.2 per square mile (66.1/km^{2}). The racial makeup of the CDP was 95.91% White, 0.64% African American, 1.20% Native American, 0.56% Asian, 0.16% Pacific Islander, and 1.52% from two or more races. Hispanic or Latino of any race were 0.40% of the population.

There were 456 households, out of which 30.7% had children under the age of 18 living with them, 57.9% were married couples living together, 9.2% had a female householder with no husband present, and 30.9% were non-families. 25.0% of all households were made up of individuals, and 9.6% had someone living alone who was 65 years of age or older. The average household size was 2.53 and the average family size was 3.04.

In the settlement the population was spread out, with 23.0% under the age of 18, 6.9% from 18 to 24, 27.8% from 25 to 44, 23.7% from 45 to 64, and 18.6% who were 65 years of age or older. The median age was 40 years. For every 100 females, there were 92.6 males. For every 100 females age 18 and over, there were 90.3 males.

The median income for a household in the community was $39,306, and the median income for a family was $45,313. Males had a median income of $34,167 versus $27,143 for females. The per capita income for the CDP was $17,882. About 2.2% of families and 6.4% of the population were below the poverty line, including 4.0% of those under age 18 and none of those age 65 or over.

== Notable people ==
- William W. Campbell, former New York State Senator
- Jim Haslett, American football player and coach
- Warren Hull, actor and TV personality
- Benjamin Vandervoort, distinguished US Army Officer in World War II
- Belva Ann Lockwood, author, attorney and Women's Rights activist
