= National Register of Historic Places listings in Essex County, New York =

Location of Essex County in New York

List of the National Register of Historic Places listings in Essex County, New York.

This is intended to be a complete list of properties and districts listed on the National Register of Historic Places in Essex County, New York, United States. The locations of National Register properties and districts (at least for all showing latitude and longitude coordinates below) can be seen in a map by clicking on "Map of all coordinates". Seven of the properties and districts are further designated National Historic Landmarks and are indicated by light blue color in the table below.

This National Park Service list is complete through NPS recent listings posted August 7, 2026.

Contents: Counties in New York
Albany (Albany) – Allegany – Bronx – Broome – Cattaraugus – Cayuga – Chautauqua – Chemung – Chenango – Clinton – Columbia – Cortland – Delaware – Dutchess (Poughkeepsie, Rhinebeck) – Erie (Buffalo) – Essex – Franklin – Fulton – Genesee – Greene – Hamilton – Herkimer – Jefferson – Kings – Lewis – Livingston – Madison – Monroe (Rochester) – Montgomery – Nassau – New York (Below 14th Street, 14th to 59th Streets, 59th to 110th Streets, Above 110th Street, Islands) – Niagara (Niagara Falls) – Oneida – Onondaga (Syracuse) – Ontario – Orange – Orleans – Oswego – Otsego – Putnam – Queens – Rensselaer – Richmond – Rockland – St. Lawrence – Saratoga – Schenectady – Schoharie – Schuyler – Seneca – Steuben – Suffolk – Sullivan – Tioga – Tompkins – Ulster – Warren – Washington – Wayne – Westchester (Northern, Southern, New Rochelle, Peekskill, Yonkers) – Wyoming – Yates

== Current listings ==
	Name on the Register	Image	Date listed	Location	City or town	Description
1	Adirondack Forest Preserve	Adirondack Forest Preserve	October 15, 1966 (#66000891)	Northeast New York State; 43°58′43″N 74°18′42″W	Not applicable	All of Essex County is in the six million acre (24,000 square miles (62,000 km^{2})) Adirondack Park.
2	Adirondack Iron and Steel Company	Adirondack Iron and Steel Company	October 5, 1977 (#77000940)	Upper Works Rd. 44°04′41″N 74°03′22″W	Tahawus	The remains of the "Upper Works" iron foundry that date back to 1826. Iron from the site was contaminated with titanium, which, together with its isolation, made for an unprofitable venture.
3	Adsit Log House	Adsit Log House	August 18, 1992 (#92001053)	Point Rd. north of Ligonier Pt. 44°25′18″N 73°22′35″W	Willsboro	Built by an American Revolutionary War veteran, one of oldest log cabins in the United States that still exists in its original location
4	Abraham Aiken House	Abraham Aiken House	June 8, 1989 (#89000465)	NY 22/Lakeshore Rd. 44°20′36″N 73°21′46″W	Willsboro	A 2 1/2-story brick, gable-roofed historic house and estate built about 1807 in the Georgian style featuring a central Palladian window. Also on the property are a horse barn, tenants' cottage, and five stone lined wells.
5	Amherst Avenue Historic District	Amherst Avenue Historic District	June 16, 1989 (#89000473)	322-340 Amherst Ave. 43°50′38″N 73°25′34″W	Ticonderoga	part of the Ticonderoga Multiple Resource Area (MRA)
6	Asgaard Farm	Asgaard Farm	January 24, 2020 (#100004907)	74 Asgaard Way; 44°25′23″N 73°40′31″W	Au Sable Forks	
7	Au Sable Forks Historic District	Au Sable Forks Historic District	January 28, 2026 (#100012670)	NY Rte 9N between the east and west branches of the Ausable River; and between College Street and School Lane; 44°26′22″N 73°40′39″W	Jay	
8	AuSable Chasm Bridge	AuSable Chasm Bridge	November 12, 1999 (#99001320)	U.S. Route 9 over the Ausable River; 44°31′29″N 73°27′48″W	Ausable Chasm (Chesterfield)	Extends into Clinton County
9	Ausable Club	Ausable Club	July 6, 2005 (#05000683)	137 Ausable Rd. 44°09′07″N 73°46′51″W	St. Huberts	The 1890 clubhouse of the Adirondack Mountain Reserve, which was formed in 1887 to save 25,000 acres (100 km^{2}) of the Adirondack High Peaks from lumbering. The Reserve once owned most of the High Peaks; it still owns 7,000 acres (28 km^{2}), and provides public access to many high peaks trails. A boundary increase was approved February 20, 2025.
10	Beer's Bridge	Beer's Bridge	November 12, 1999 (#99001327)	Private Rd. off NY 73 over Ausable River; 44°10′11″N 73°46′57″W	Keene Valley	Beer's Bridge is a historic Pratt Pony truss bridge over the Ausable River built in 1900 by the Pratt, Tomas & Caleb Company. The site is part of the AuSable River Valley Bridges Multiple Property Submission (MPS)
11	Black Watch Library	Black Watch Library	November 15, 1988 (#88002199)	161 Montcalm St. 43°50′54″N 73°25′34″W	Ticonderoga	Black Watch Library is a historic library building built in 1905.It is a one-story brick structure with a cruciform plan in the Jacobean Revival style. It features a blue/green slate gable roof with projecting rafter ends.
12	Bogie Cottage	Bogie Cottage	November 6, 1992 (#92001464)	59 Franklin St. 44°19′30″N 74°07′33″W	Saranac Lake	A 1908, American Craftsman-inspired "cure cottage"; part of the Saranac Lake MPS
13	John Brown Farm and Gravesite	John Brown Farm and Gravesite	June 19, 1972 (#72000840)	John Brown Rd. 44°14′58″N 73°58′23″W	Lake Placid	The home from 1849, and final resting place, of abolitionist John Brown.
14	H. G. Burleigh House	H. G. Burleigh House	November 15, 1988 (#88002192)	307 Champlain Ave. 43°50′45″N 73°25′27″W	Ticonderoga	part of the Ticonderoga MRA
15	Camp Dudley Road Historic District	Camp Dudley Road Historic District	October 21, 1993 (#93001136)	Roughly bounded by NY 22, Stacy Br., Lake Champlain and the Westport village line 44°09′15″N 73°25′04″W	Westport	With 131 contributing buildings this late-19th and early-20th century historic district includes vernacular farmhouses in a variety of styles, barn complexes, a stone 1816 schoolhouse, Skenewood Estate, the Stable Inn properties, Germain property, "Kenjockety," Barber's Point Lighthouse, and Camp Dudley, the oldest continuing boy's camp.
16	Camp Santanoni	Camp Santanoni	April 3, 1987 (#86002955)	North of NY 28N; 43°59′35″N 74°08′45″W	Newcomb	A 13,000-acre (53 km^{2}) preserve and Adirondack Great Camp established between 1892 and 1905 by Albany banker and businessman Robert C. Pruyn. Part of the Great Camps of the Adirondacks Thematic Resource (TR)
17	Central Powerhouse	Central Powerhouse	June 1, 1995 (#95000591)	Jct. of Tracy Rd. and New Bed Rd., SE corner, Town of Moriah; 44°05′23″N 73°32′13″W	Witherbee	part of the Moriah MPS. It has been demolished.
18	Central School		November 15, 1988 (#88002202)	324 Champlain Ave. 43°50′40″N 73°25′25″W	Ticonderoga	Demolished in 2001; part of the Ticonderoga MRA
19	Champlain II Shipwreck	Champlain II Shipwreck	September 15, 1997 (#97000980)	On the bottom of Lake Champlain; 44°12′21″N 73°22′39″W	Westport	
20	Church of the Nazarene	Church of the Nazarene	June 19, 1973 (#73001189)	West of Essex on NY 22; 44°18′07″N 73°24′07″W	Essex	Built in 1855 as St. John's Episcopal Church, it became the Union Church at Boquet Chapel in 1880, the Church of the Nazarene in 1949 and Foothills Baptist Church in 2005.
21	Clark House	Clark House	November 15, 1988 (#88002204)	331 Montcalm St. 43°50′54″N 73°26′32″W	Ticonderoga	part of the Ticonderoga MRA
22	Peyton Clark Cottage	Peyton Clark Cottage	November 6, 1992 (#92001435)	9 Rockledge Rd. 44°19′48″N 74°07′21″W	Saranac Lake	A 1915 large, Tudor-style, 2 and 1/2 story "cure cottage" designed by William H. Scopes. The owner was a civil engineer whose wife had tuberculosis. Part of the Saranac Lake MPS
23	Community Building	Community Building	November 15, 1988 (#88002198)	Montcalm and Champlain Sts. 43°50′54″N 73°26′18″W	Ticonderoga	part of the Ticonderoga MRA
24	Coulter Cottage	Coulter Cottage	November 6, 1992 (#92001438)	34 Shepard Ave. 44°19′32″N 74°07′35″W	Saranac Lake	A 2½-story "cure cottage" designed by William L. Coulter and built between 1897 and 1899 as his residence. Part of the Saranac Lake MPS
25	Clayton H. Delano House	Clayton H. Delano House	November 15, 1988 (#88002195)	25 Father Jogues Pl. 43°50′50″N 73°25′37″W	Ticonderoga	part of the Ticonderoga MRA
26	Crandall Marine Railway		May 4, 2011 (#11000251)	11 Dry Dock Lane; 43°48′27″N 73°26′55″W	Ticonderoga	
27	Crown Point Green Historic District	Crown Point Green Historic District	May 18, 2015 (#15000231)	Park Ave., Creek Rd., NY 9N/22; 43°57′07″N 73°25′59″W	Crown Point	Village's central green is surrounded by many of its important early buildings
28	Cure Cottage at 43 Forest Hill Avenue	Cure Cottage at 43 Forest Hill Avenue	November 21, 2012 (#12000954)	43 Forest Hill Ave. 44°19′47″N 74°07′23″W	Saranac Lake	This is a historic "cure cottage" built about 1912. It is a two-story, clapboarded wood frame dwelling on a stone foundation with a steep gable roof with overhanging eaves. It features a second floor cure porch.
29	Delaware & Hudson Railroad Depot	Delaware & Hudson Railroad Depot	June 1, 1995 (#95000593)	Park Pl., Town of Moriah; 44°02′33″N 73°27′31″W	Port Henry	Stone 1888 D&H station also used as community meeting place and senior center; part of the Moriah MPS
30	Denny Cottage	Denny Cottage	November 6, 1992 (#92001452)	76 Bloomingdale Ave. 44°20′24″N 74°07′38″W	Saranac Lake	A "cure cottage" built about 1910. Part of the Saranac Lake MPS
31	Double-Span Metal Pratt Truss Bridge	Double-Span Metal Pratt Truss Bridge	May 20, 1983 (#83001665)	AuSable St. 44°30′01″N 73°29′07″W	Keeseville	part of the Keeseville Village MRA
32	Edgewater Farm	Edgewater Farm	February 17, 1988 (#88000035)	470 Point Rd. 44°24′05″N 73°23′04″W	Willsboro Point	
33	Essex County Fairgrounds	Essex County Fairgrounds	September 7, 2005 (#05000993)	3 Sisco St. 44°11′11″N 73°26′56″W	Westport	
34	Essex County Home and Farm	Essex County Home and Farm	September 23, 1982 (#82003357)	Southwest of Whallonsburg on NY 22; 44°15′23″N 73°24′38″W	Whallonsburg	
35	Essex County Municipal Complex	Essex County Municipal Complex	May 3, 2016 (#16000224)	7551–7559 Court St. 44°12′51″N 73°35′41″W	Elizabethtown	1824 courthouse forms core of county government buildings
36	Essex Village Historic District	Essex Village Historic District	May 28, 1975 (#75001187)	Town of Essex and surroundings on W bank of Lake Champlain; 44°18′44″N 73°21′10″W	Essex	
37	Fallon Cottage Annex	Fallon Cottage Annex	November 6, 1992 (#92001463)	31 Franklin St. 44°19′36″N 74°07′34″W	Saranac Lake	A 1901 "cure cottage". Part of the Saranac Lake MPS
38	Ferris House	Ferris House	November 15, 1988 (#88002203)	16 Carillon Rd. 43°50′25″N 73°25′23″W	Ticonderoga	part of the Ticonderoga MRA
39	First Congregational and Presbyterian Society Church of Westport	First Congregational and Presbyterian Society Church of Westport	December 19, 1988 (#88002750)	Main St./CR 10; 44°13′50″N 73°27′33″W	Westport	
40	First Congregational Church and Cemetery	First Congregational Church and Cemetery	January 5, 2005 (#04001457)	NY 9 at Elizabeth-Lewis Rd. 44°16′40″N 73°34′05″W	Lewis	
41	Flat Rock Camp	Flat Rock Camp	July 26, 2006 (#06000642)	7 Willsboro Point Rd. 44°22′34″N 73°22′14″W	Willsboro	An Adirondack Great Camp; part of the Great Camps of the Adirondacks TR
42	Fort Crown Point	Fort Crown Point	November 24, 1968 (#68000033)	Crown Point Reservation, Southwest of Lake Champlain Bridge and NY 8; 44°00′21″N 73°25′42″W	Crown Point	A British fort built in 1759 to secure the region against the French.
43	Fort St. Frederic	Fort St. Frederic	October 15, 1966 (#66000517)	Jct. of NY 8 and 9N; 44°01′43″N 73°25′22″W	Crown Point	A French fort started in 1734 to gain control of the New France/Vermont border region in the Lake Champlain Valley. The walls were twelve feet thick and four stories high, with cannons on each level, manned by over a thousand officers and men.
44	Fort Ticonderoga	Fort Ticonderoga	October 15, 1966 (#66000519)	2.5 mi (4.0 km). south of Ticonderoga on NY 22; 43°50′00″N 73°23′45″W	Ticonderoga	A large 18th-century fort built by the French starting in 1755 that controlled both commonly used trade routes between the English-controlled Hudson River Valley and the French-controlled Saint Lawrence River Valley. It played a part in the American Revolutionary War.
45	Frazier Bridge	Frazier Bridge	December 17, 1998 (#98001540)	Champlain Ave., at Lachute R. 43°51′01″N 73°25′21″W	Ticonderoga	part of the Ticonderoga MRA
46	Samson Fried Estate		February 26, 1987 (#87000225)	NY 74; 43°52′32″N 73°42′54″W	Severance	
47	Gilligan and Stevens Block	Gilligan and Stevens Block	November 15, 1988 (#88002193)	115 Montclam St. 43°50′56″N 73°25′30″W	Ticonderoga	part of the Ticonderoga MRA
48	Gooley Club		May 4, 2018 (#100002383)	Gooley Club Road; 43°52′16″N 74°14′48″W	Newcomb and Minerva	Buildings used by private hunting club through early 21st century. Demolished 2018–21
49	Graves Mansion	Graves Mansion	November 10, 2022 (#100008338)	27 Church Ln. 44°26′23″N 73°40′50″W	Au Sable Forks	
50	Hancock House	Hancock House	November 15, 1988 (#88002197)	Montcalm and Wicker Sts. 43°50′54″N 73°26′06″W	Ticonderoga	part of the Ticonderoga MRA
51	Hand–Hale Historic District	Hand–Hale Historic District	March 5, 1979 (#79001582)	River and Maple Sts. 44°12′54″N 73°35′19″W	Elizabethtown	
52	Helen Hill Historic District	Helen Hill Historic District	October 23, 2015 (#15000754)	Prescott Place, Helen & Front Sts., Sheppard, Franklin & Clinton Aves. 44°19′30″N 74°07′40″W	Saranac Lake	Residential neighborhood from early 20th century, with many cottages retaining the "cure porches" that distinguished the area's early days as a sanitarium.
53	Henry's Garage		May 15, 2017 (#100000996)	14 Church Street; 44°02′50″N 73°27′39″W	Port Henry	
54	Highland Park Historic District	Highland Park Historic District	November 6, 1992 (#92001474)	Roughly, Park Ave. from Military Rd. to 170 Park Ave. 44°20′10″N 74°07′32″W	Saranac Lake	Seventeen private, single-family homes built between 1896 and 1930; most include "cure cottage" features. Part of the Saranac Lake MPS
55	Hill Cottage	Hill Cottage	November 6, 1992 (#92001475)	36 Franklin Ave. 44°19′36″N 74°07′32″W	Saranac Lake	A 1913 Craftsman-style "cure cottage".
56	Hubbard Hall	Hubbard Hall	January 21, 1999 (#98001584)	Court St. 44°12′56″N 73°35′33″W	Elizabethtown	Burned to the ground, 1/2011
57	Hurricane Mountain Fire Observation Station	Hurricane Mountain Fire Observation Station	January 29, 2007 (#06001145)	Hurricane Mountain Summit; 44°14′06″N 73°42′38″W	Keene	A 35-foot (11 m) fire tower built in 1919 on 3,964-foot (1,208 m) Hurricane Mountain. Part of the Fire Observation Stations of New York State Forest Preserve MPS
58	Ironville Historic District	Ironville Historic District	December 27, 1974 (#74001237)	Area surrounding Ironville including Furnace St. and Penfield Pond; 43°55′17″N 73°32′07″W	Ironville	
59	Keene Valley Country Club		August 27, 2020 (#100005480)	8 Country Club Ln. 44°11′29″N 73°47′06″W	Keene Valley	
60	Keene Valley Library	Keene Valley Library	December 13, 2000 (#00001528)	Main St. 44°11′25″N 73°47′11″W	Keene Valley	
61	Keeseville Historic District	Keeseville Historic District	May 20, 1983 (#83001666)	Roughly bounded by Vine, Chesterfield, Clinton, Hill, Pleasant, Front, and Beech Sts. 44°30′16″N 73°28′58″W	Keeseville	part of the Keeseville Village MRA
62	Keith and Branch Ford Motors Factory and Showroom	Keith and Branch Ford Motors Factory and Showroom	May 28, 2013 (#13000329)	12198 NY 9N; 44°20′11″N 73°46′43″W	Upper Jay	Built in the 1920s to sell Ford Model T's, this is a rare early example of automobile-oriented architecture in the Adirondacks
63	Kennedy Cottage	Kennedy Cottage	November 6, 1992 (#92001437)	26 Shepard St. 44°19′37″N 74°07′36″W	Saranac Lake	A 1987 "cure cottage" that was used by the National Vaudeville Artists Philanthropic Association prior to the construction of the Will Rogers Hospital. Part of the Saranac Lake MPS
64	Kessel Park Inn		August 4, 2023 (#100009190)	33 and 39 Kessel Park Rd., 113 Corlear Bay Rd. 44°28′38″N 73°24′50″W	Port Douglas	
65	Lake George Avenue Historic District	Lake George Avenue Historic District	June 16, 1989 (#89000472)	301-331 Lake George Ave. 43°50′44″N 73°25′43″W	Ticonderoga	part of the Ticonderoga MRA
66	Lake View Grange No. 970	Lake View Grange No. 970	August 27, 2013 (#13000626)	22 Champlain Ave. 44°11′09″N 73°26′15″W	Westport	Classically-decorated building later used as roller rink; now town hall
67	Lane Cottage	Lane Cottage	November 6, 1992 (#92001434)	4 Rockledge Rd. 44°19′47″N 74°07′22″W	Saranac Lake	A 1923 "cure cottage" built by Edward Shaw for his wife, who had tuberculosis. The Shaws had two young children; fearing that they would contract TB from Mrs. Shaw, a separate house was built for them, nearby. Part of the Saranac Lake MPS
68	Dr. Henry Leetch House	Dr. Henry Leetch House	November 6, 1992 (#92001471)	3 Johnson Rd. 44°19′35″N 74°07′14″W	Saranac Lake	A 1932 "cure cottage" designed by William L. Distin for Dr. Henry Leetch, who specialized in treating tuberculosis, and who had the disease himself. Part of the Saranac Lake MPS
69	Lent Cottage	Lent Cottage	November 6, 1992 (#92001462)	18 Franklin Ave. 44°19′43″N 74°07′33″W	Saranac Lake	An apartment house, built about 1920 as a "cure cottage". Part of the Saranac Lake MPS
70	Liberty Monument	Liberty Monument	November 16, 1989 (#89002014)	NY 9N at Montcalm St. 43°50′53″N 73°26′07″W	Ticonderoga	part of the Ticonderoga MRA
71	Ligonier Point Historic District	Ligonier Point Historic District	January 2, 2013 (#12001129)	Point Rd., Ligonier Way; 44°24′56″N 73°22′31″W	Willsboro	The Ligonier Point Historic District consists of eight buildings and two dozen contributing structures and sites, related to stone quarrying, boat building, and farming by the Clark family during the 19th century.
72	Marquay Cottage	Marquay Cottage	November 6, 1992 (#92001439)	6 Slater St. 44°19′18″N 74°07′20″W	Saranac Lake	A 1914, Queen Anne-style "cure cottage" built of rusticated cast-concrete blocks, with an octagonal corner tower. Part of the Saranac Lake MPS
73	Marvin Cottage	Marvin Cottage	November 6, 1992 (#92001461)	15 Franklin St. 44°19′43″N 74°07′36″W	Saranac Lake	A "cure cottage" built about 1900. Part of the Saranac Lake MPS
74	Silas B. Moore Gristmill	Silas B. Moore Gristmill	November 15, 1988 (#88002190)	218 Montcalm St. 43°50′53″N 73°25′41″W	Ticonderoga	part of the Ticonderoga MRA
75	Moriah Town Office Building	Moriah Town Office Building	May 18, 1995 (#95000594)	Cedar St., Town of Moriah; 44°02′56″N 73°27′44″W	Port Henry	part of the Moriah MPS
76	Mount Adams Fire Observation Station	Mount Adams Fire Observation Station	April 12, 2006 (#06000253)	Mount Adams; 44°04′52″N 74°03′21″W	Newcomb	part of the Fire Observation Stations of New York State Forest Preserve MPS
77	Mount Moriah Presbyterian Church	Mount Moriah Presbyterian Church	June 1, 1995 (#95000592)	Jct. of Church and S. Main Sts., NW corner, Town of Moriah; 44°02′53″N 73°27′39″W	Port Henry	part of the Moriah MPS
78	Mount Van Hoevenberg Olympic Bobsled Run	Mount Van Hoevenberg Olympic Bobsled Run	February 4, 2010 (#10000008)	200 Bob Run Lane; 44°13′11″N 73°55′15″W	Lake Placid	
79	New York Central Railroad Adirondack Division Historic District	New York Central Railroad Adirondack Division Historic District	December 23, 1993 (#93001451)	NYCRR Right-of-Way from Remsen to Lake Placid; 44°16′34″N 73°59′09″W	Lake Placid	The New York Central Adirondack Line ended in Lake Placid. There are extant stations in Ray Brook and Lake Placid; the Adirondack Scenic Railroad used to run a tourist train between Lake Placid and the station in Saranac Lake.
80	Notman Bridge	Notman Bridge	November 12, 1999 (#99001328)	Country Club Rd. over AuSable R. 44°11′29″N 73°47′05″W	Keene Valley	part of the AuSable River Valley Bridges MPS
81	NYS Armory	NYS Armory	November 15, 1988 (#88002200)	315 Champlain Ave. 43°50′42″N 73°25′29″W	Ticonderoga	part of the Ticonderoga MRA
82	North-Sprague Farm		October 29, 2020 (#100005707)	327 Cty. Rd. 55 (Walker Rd.); 44°15′59″N 73°26′58″W	Essex vicinity	
83	Octagonal Schoolhouse	Octagonal Schoolhouse	January 17, 1973 (#73001190)	On Rte. 22 in Bouquet; 44°18′14″N 73°24′08″W	Essex	An 1827 stone octagonal school building
84	Old State Road Bridge	Old State Road Bridge	November 12, 1999 (#99001319)	Old State Rd. over AuSable R. 44°31′25″N 73°27′37″W	Chesterfield	part of the AuSable River Valley Bridges MPS; crosses into Clinton County
85	Pad Factory	Pad Factory	November 15, 1988 (#88002205)	109 Lake George Ave. 43°50′53″N 73°25′39″W	Ticonderoga	part of the Ticonderoga MRA
86	Partridge Cottage	Partridge Cottage	March 31, 1992 (#92001440)	15 South St. 44°19′27″N 74°07′27″W	Saranac Lake	A 1925 Colonial Revival apartment house, with three apartments used as a cure cottages for three families. Part of the Saranac Lake MPS
87	Pittenger Cottage	Pittenger Cottage	November 6, 1992 (#92001460)	14 Forest Hill Ave. 44°19′43″N 74°07′19″W	Saranac Lake	A "cure cottage" with five cure porches, built about 1920. Part of the Saranac Lake MPS
88	Poke-O-Moonshine Mountain Fire Observation Station	Poke-O-Moonshine Mountain Fire Observation Station	September 23, 2001 (#01001034)	Poke-O-Moonshine Mountain; 44°23′16″N 73°30′29″W	Chesterfield	1917 fire tower was first in state to employ alidade to help triangulate location of fires.
89	Port Henry Fire Department Building	Port Henry Fire Department Building	June 1, 1995 (#95000590)	33 Broad St., Town of Moriah; 44°02′56″N 73°27′44″W	Port Henry	part of the Moriah MPS
90	Putnam Camp		October 17, 2012 (#12000876)	1196 NY 73; 44°09′13″N 73°46′05″W	St. Huberts	
91	Ranney Bridge	Ranney Bridge	November 12, 1999 (#99001329)	Private Rd. off NY 73 over East Branch of AuSable R. 44°10′55″N 73°47′03″W	Keene Valley	part of the AuSable River Valley Bridges MPS
92	Rembrandt Hall	Rembrandt Hall	May 20, 1983 (#83001677)	Clinton St. 44°30′07″N 73°28′39″W	Keeseville	part of the Keeseville Village MRA
93	Sheldon–Owens Farm	Sheldon–Owens Farm	April 1, 1993 (#93000171)	Lake Shore Rd. southeast of the junction with Middle and West Rds. 44°20′44″N 73°22′28″W	Willsboro	Sheldon–Owens Farm is a historic district set on a property assembled between 1784 and 1945. The oldest structure is a barn dated to the late 18th century. Outbuildings include barns, a granary, brick smokehouse, and sugar house. The farmhouse dates to 1853.
94	Sherman Free Library	Sherman Free Library	June 1, 1995 (#95000595)	4 Church St., Town of Moriah; 44°02′51″N 73°27′38″W	Port Henry	part of the Moriah MPS
95	Slater Bridge		November 12, 1999 (#99001325)	East Branch of AuSable R. off St. Hubert's Rd. 44°09′31″N 73°46′40″W	Keene Valley	part of the AuSable River Valley Bridges MPS
96	Spitfire (gunboat)	Spitfire (gunboat)	July 24, 2008 (#08000694)	On the seafloor of Lake Champlain near Schuyler Island	Lake Champlain	Extends into Clinton County
97	Stevenson Cottage	Stevenson Cottage	November 6, 1992 (#92001441)	Stevenson Ln. 44°19′51″N 74°07′26″W	Saranac Lake	A "cure cottage" used by Robert Louis Stevenson in 1887. Part of the Saranac Lake MPS
98	Stone Arch Bridge	Stone Arch Bridge	November 12, 1999 (#99001323)	Main St. over AuSable R. 44°30′19″N 73°28′52″W	Keeseville	part of the AuSable River Valley Bridges MPS
99	Stuckman Cottage	Stuckman Cottage	November 6, 1992 (#92001459)	6 Clinton Ave. 44°19′39″N 74°07′28″W	Saranac Lake	A "cure cottage" built between 1897 and 1900.
100	Swing Bridge	Swing Bridge	November 12, 1999 (#99001322)	Over the Ausable River between Clinton and S. AuSable Sts. 44°30′13″N 73°28′58″W	Keeseville	part of the AuSable River Valley Bridges MPS
101	Tahawus Masonic Lodge	Tahawus Masonic Lodge	March 9, 2021 (#100006216)	14234 Main St. 44°26′27″N 73°40′33″W	Au Sable Forks	
102	Talichito		August 22, 2012 (#12000533)	Nesa Rd. 43°50′06″N 73°44′34″W	Schroon Lake	
103	Ticonderoga High School	Ticonderoga High School	November 15, 1988 (#88002201)	5 Calkins Pl. 43°50′32″N 73°25′40″W	Ticonderoga	part of the Ticonderoga MRA
104	Ticonderoga National Bank	Ticonderoga National Bank	November 15, 1988 (#88002194)	101 Montcalm St. 43°50′51″N 73°25′26″W	Ticonderoga	part of the Ticonderoga MRA
105	Ticonderoga Pulp and Paper Company Office	Ticonderoga Pulp and Paper Company Office	November 15, 1988 (#88002191)	Montcalm St. 43°50′55″N 73°25′17″W	Ticonderoga	part of the Ticonderoga MRA
106	Tomlinson House	Tomlinson House	May 20, 1983 (#83001678)	Kent St. 44°30′10″N 73°28′41″W	Keeseville	part of the Keeseville Village MRA
107	Trudeau Sanatorium	Trudeau Sanatorium	April 20, 1995 (#95000479)	Trudeau Rd. 44°20′31″N 74°07′21″W	Saranac Lake	A tuberculosis sanitorium established in 1882 by Dr. Edward Livingston Trudeau, originally called the Adirondack Cottage Sanatorium. Part of the Saranac Lake MPS
108	US Post Office–Lake Placid	US Post Office–Lake Placid	November 17, 1988 (#88002339)	2591 Main St. 44°17′07″N 73°59′02″W	Lake Placid	part of the US Post Offices in New York State, 1858-1943, TR
109	US Post Office-Ticonderoga	US Post Office-Ticonderoga	May 11, 1989 (#88002436)	123 Champlain Ave. 43°50′51″N 73°25′26″W	Ticonderoga	part of the US Post Offices in New York State, 1858-1943, TR
110	The Uplands	The Uplands	March 22, 2016 (#16000109)	35 Thorne Way; 44°11′53″N 73°47′29″W	Keene Valley	Well-preserved 1910 Adirondack camp
111	Van Ornam & Murdock Block	Van Ornam & Murdock Block	November 14, 1982 (#82001172)	Main St. 44°02′54″N 73°27′36″W	Port Henry	
112	VERGENNES (canal boat)	VERGENNES (canal boat)	August 7, 2012 (#12000477)	Address Restricted	Westport	
113	Wadhams Grange Hall		April 9, 2024 (#100009879)	774 NYS Route 22; 44°13′48″N 73°27′36″W	Westport	
114	Walton Bridge	Walton Bridge	November 12, 1999 (#99001326)	Dr. Ray Rd. access over AuSable R. 44°14′41″N 73°47′53″W	Keene	part of the AuSable River Valley Bridges MPS
115	Elkanah Watson House	Elkanah Watson House	October 15, 1966 (#66000518)	3 mi (4.8 km). east of US 9; 44°31′30″N 73°24′21″W	Port Kent	Home of Elkanah Watson, Revolutionary-era diplomat, founder of the county fair and early promoter of canals, who occupied it in May 1828. Designed by Sheldon & Merritt and constructed under the supervision of Watson's son Charles.
116	Wells Memorial Library	Wells Memorial Library	May 18, 2011 (#11000289)	12230 NY 9N; 44°20′17″N 73°46′25″W	Upper Jay	
117	Wellscroft		January 28, 2004 (#03001513)	158 NY 9N; 44°20′37″N 73°46′21″W	Upper Jay	
118	Westport Historic District	Westport Historic District	May 20, 2021 (#100006513)	Generally Champlain Ave., Main, Sisco, and Washington Sts. 44°11′00″N 73°26′02″W	Westport	
119	Whiteface Veterans Memorial Highway Complex	Whiteface Veterans Memorial Highway Complex	October 10, 2008 (#06001147)	New York State Route 431; 44°23′59″N 73°51′49″W	Wilmington	Highest road in state built to honor WWI veterans in late 1920s.
120	Will Rogers Memorial Hospital	Will Rogers Memorial Hospital	September 8, 1983 (#83001679)	NY 86; 44°18′39″N 74°06′51″W	Saranac Lake	A 100-bed tuberculosis sanitarium for vaudeville performers built by the National Vaudeville Artists in 1930.
121	Willsboro Congregational Church	Willsboro Congregational Church	May 31, 1984 (#84002391)	NY 22; 44°21′49″N 73°23′35″W	Willsboro	
122	The Willsboro School	The Willsboro School	March 31, 2010 (#10000135)	10 Gilliland Lane (formerly 29 School St.); 44°21′53″N 73°23′24″W	Willsboro	
123	Wilmington Bridge		November 12, 1999 (#99001324)	NY 86 over AuSable R. 44°23′20″N 73°49′04″W	Wilmington	part of the AuSable River Valley Bridges MPS
124	Witherbee Memorial Hall	Witherbee Memorial Hall	April 22, 1991 (#91000421)	Broad St. east of the junction with Office Rd. 44°05′17″N 73°31′41″W	Mineville	

== Former listing ==
	Name on the Register	Image	Date listed	Date removed	Location	City or town	Description
1	St. Mary's Church and Rectory	St. Mary's Church and Rectory	November 5, 1988 (#88002196)	May 25, 1989	10-12 Father Jogues Pl.	Ticonderoga	
2	State Theater		April 30, 1992 (#92000454)	September 17, 1999	18 Montcalm St.	Ticonderoga	Demolished after part of the roof collapsed on March 16, 1994.

== See also ==
- Cure Cottages of Saranac Lake
- National Register of Historic Places listings in New York
