= Charles Quigg =

American politician

Charles Emmett Quigg (September 30, 1851 – February 12, 1909) was an American physician and politician.

Born in Ticonderoga, New York, Quigg attended Belfast Medical School and then Bennett Medical College in Chicago, Illinois. In 1880, Quigg settled in Tomah, Wisconsin and practiced medicine. Quigg served as mayor of Tomah from 1888 to 1890. In 1893, Quigg served in the Wisconsin State Assembly as a Democrat. Quigg died in Tomah, Wisconsin in 1909.
