= Ticonderoga Pulp and Paper Company Office =

Historic commercial building in New York, United States

- U.S. National Register of Historic Places
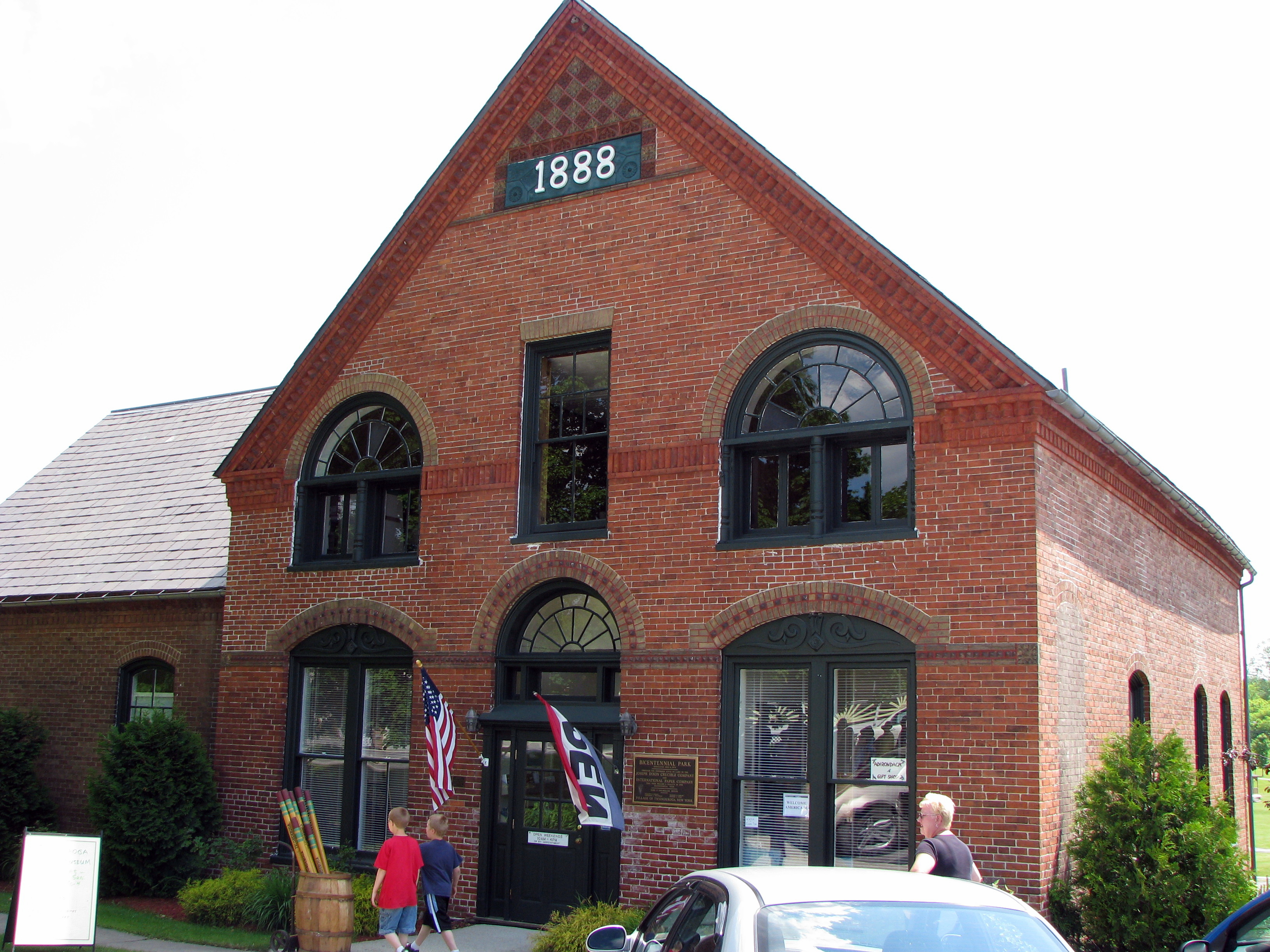
- Ticonderoga Pulp and Paper Company Office, May 2009

- Location within New York Location within the United States
- Location: Montcalm St., Ticonderoga, New York
- Coordinates: 43°50′55″N 73°25′17″W
- Area: less than one acre
- Built: 1888
- Architectural style: Late Victorian
- MPS: Ticonderoga MRA
- NRHP reference No.: 88002191
- Added to NRHP: November 15, 1988

Ticonderoga Pulp and Paper Company Office is a historic office building located at Ticonderoga in Essex County, New York. It was built in 1888 and is a rectangular, two story structure of brick laid in common bond with a rectangular brick addition built about 1910. Both sections have gray slate gable roofs, white painted wood trim, and a denticulated brick cornice. The company was organized in 1877 by Clayton H. Delano, whose house is also listed on the register.

It was listed on the National Register of Historic Places in 1988.

The building now houses the Ticonderoga Heritage Museum which share the industrial heritage of the area with visitors. It is also the visitors information center for the town.
