= Ticonderoga, New York =

Ticonderoga, New York Tekaniataró:ken
- Town
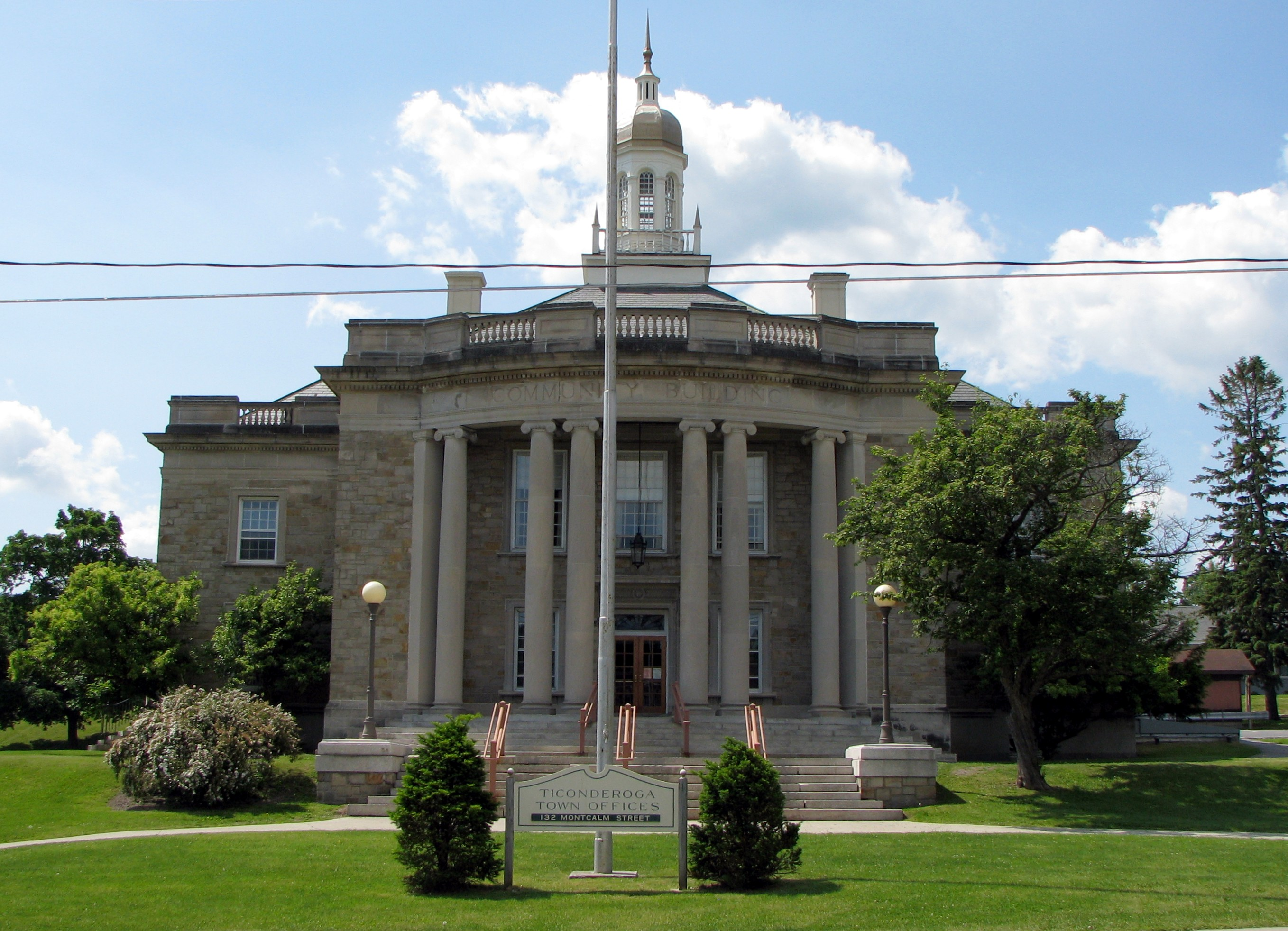
- Ticonderoga town offices

- Location in Essex County and the state of New York
- Coordinates: 43°51′30″N 73°27′15″W
- Country: United States
- State: New York
- County: Essex

Government
  - Type: Town Council
  - Town Supervisor: Mark A. Wright
  - Town Council: Members' List: • Joyce Cooper; • Dave Woods; • Tom Cunningham

Area
  - Total: 88.44 sq mi (229.07 km^{2})
  - Land: 81.43 sq mi (210.91 km^{2})
  - Water: 7.01 sq mi (18.16 km^{2})
- Elevation: 663 ft (202 m)

Population (2020)
  - Total: 4,789
  - Density: 54.2/sq mi (20.91/km^{2})
- Time zone: UTC-5 (Eastern (EST))
  - Summer (DST): UTC-4 (EDT)
- ZIP Codes: 12883 (Ticonderoga); 12836 (Hague)
- Area code: 518
- FIPS code: 36-031-73891
- GNIS feature ID: 0979547
- Website: townofticonderoga.gov

Ticonderoga (/taɪkɒndəˈroʊɡə/) is a town in Essex County, New York, United States. The population was 5,042 at the 2010 census. The name comes from the Mohawk tekontaró:ken, meaning "it is at the junction of two waterways".

The Town of Ticonderoga is in the southeastern corner of the county and is south of Plattsburgh. Its downtown and surrounding built up areas in the southeastern part of town comprise the Ticonderoga census designated place, which contains two thirds of the town’s population.

== History ==
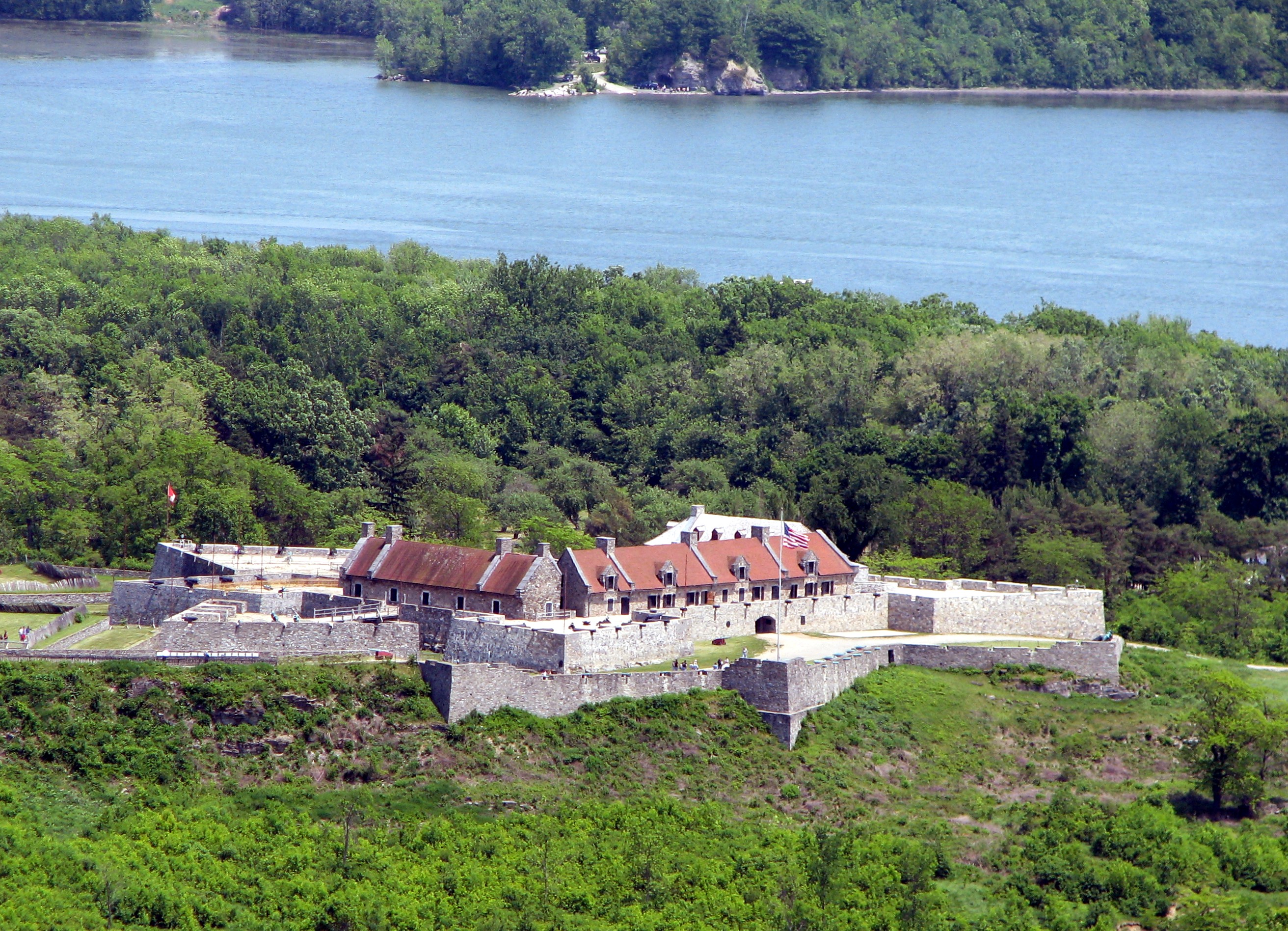
Fort Ticonderoga located on the east side of town on NY 74

In the 17th century, French explorers such as Samuel de Champlain encountered the area.

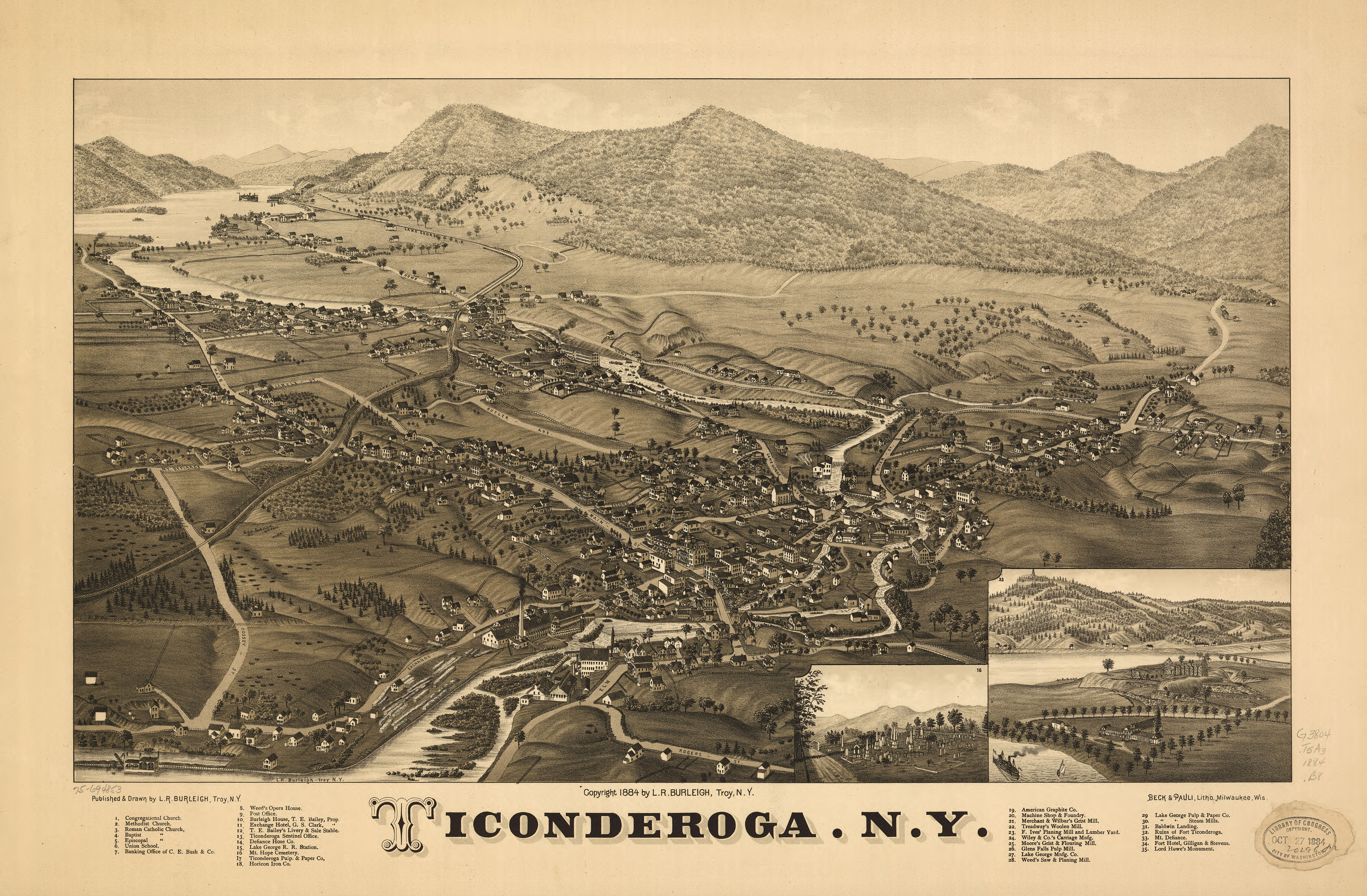
Perspective map of Ticonderoga with list of landmarks from 1884 by L.R. Burleigh

The town was on the direct route, utilizing rivers and two long lakes, between New York City to the south and the French settlement of Montreal to the north. The town was the setting for historic battles and maneuvers during both the French and Indian War and the American Revolutionary War. Fort Ticonderoga, constructed by the French, who called it Fort Carillon, in the 1750s, marked the location of an important portage between the two lakes, George and Champlain.

The Town of Ticonderoga was formed in 1804 from part of the town of Crown Point. By the end of the 18th century, the town was noted for wood products such as paper and lead pencils. The position of the now former Ticonderoga village at the north end of Lake George made it an important port. The village was dissolved on December 31, 1993, after a public referendum, its operations were absorbed by the Town of Ticonderoga.

As early as 1812, Ticonderoga was the site of graphite mining. Commercial mining of graphite began in 1832, though logging remained the chief Industry. Graphite was not widely used in the 19th century, as most writing was done in pen, rather than pencil. It was not until the mid-20th century that pencils came into greater use, with the No. 2 HB pencil becoming the standard writing implement in schools and universities. The iconic Dixon Ticonderoga pencil was named after the graphite that was mined and processed in Ticonderoga.

Historic Fort Ticonderoga is in this town, east of the former village of Ticonderoga.

== Geography ==
According to the United States Census Bureau, the town has a total area of 88.5 square miles (229.1 km^{2}), of which 81.4 square miles (210.9 km^{2}) is land and 7.0 square miles (18.2 km^{2}), or 7.93%, is water.

The town encompasses both the northern end of Lake George and a portion of Lake Champlain near its southern end. The short, but rapidly flowing, La Chute River connects the two lakes. The eastern town line is the border of Vermont, and the southern town boundary is the county line of Warren and Washington counties.

New York State Route 9N is a north–south highway. Another north–south highway, New York State Route 22, is partly conjoined with NY-9N in the town. New York State Route 74, an east–west highway, intersects NY-9N/NY-22 near Ticonderoga.

== Demographics ==
Historical population
Census	Pop.	Note	%±
1820	1,493		—
1830	1,996		33.7%
1840	2,169		8.7%
1850	2,669		23.1%
1860	2,271		−14.9%
1870	2,590		14.0%
1880	3,304		27.6%
1890	3,980		20.5%
1900	5,048		26.8%
1910	4,940		−2.1%
1920	5,267		6.6%
1930	5,105		−3.1%
1940	4,859		−4.8%
1950	5,204		7.1%
1960	5,617		7.9%
1970	5,839		4.0%
1980	5,436		−6.9%
1990	5,149		−5.3%
2000	5,167		0.3%
2010	5,042		−2.4%
2020	4,789		−5.0%
U.S. Decennial Census

As of the census of 2010, there were 5,042 people, 2,028 households, and 1,352 families residing in the town. The population density was 63.2 inhabitants per square mile (24.4/km^{2}). There were 2,581 housing units at an average density of 31.6 per square mile (12.2/km^{2}). The racial makeup of the town was 98.08% White, 0.46% African American, 0.31% Native American, 0.27% Asian, 0.02% Pacific Islander, and 0.85% from two or more races. Hispanic or Latino of any race were 0.41% of the population.

There were 2,028 households, out of which 31.4% had children under the age of 18 living with them, 50.0% were married couples living together, 11.3% had a female householder with no husband present, and 33.3% were non-families. 28.4% of all households were made up of individuals, and 13.0% had someone living alone who was 65 years of age or older. The average household size was 2.49 and the average family size was 3.04.

In the town, the population was spread out, with 26.7% under the age of 18, 6.5% from 18 to 24, 26.2% from 25 to 44, 24.4% from 45 to 64, and 16.2% who were 65 years of age or older. The median age was 38 years. For every 100 females, there were 93.5 males. For every 100 females age 18 and over, there were 90.4 males.

The median income for a household in the town was $34,160, and the median income for a family was $41,992. Males had a median income of $35,896 versus $21,441 for females. The per capita income for the town was $16,418. About 10.5% of families and 15.5% of the population were below the poverty line, including 21.4% of those under age 18 and 9.7% of those age 65 or over.

== Arts and culture ==
=== Tourism ===
The H.G. Burleigh House was built in 1894 and is a Queen Anne-style building with Colonial Revival features. It was originally owned by U.S. Congressman Henry G. Burleigh and has been on the National Register of Historic Places since 1988.

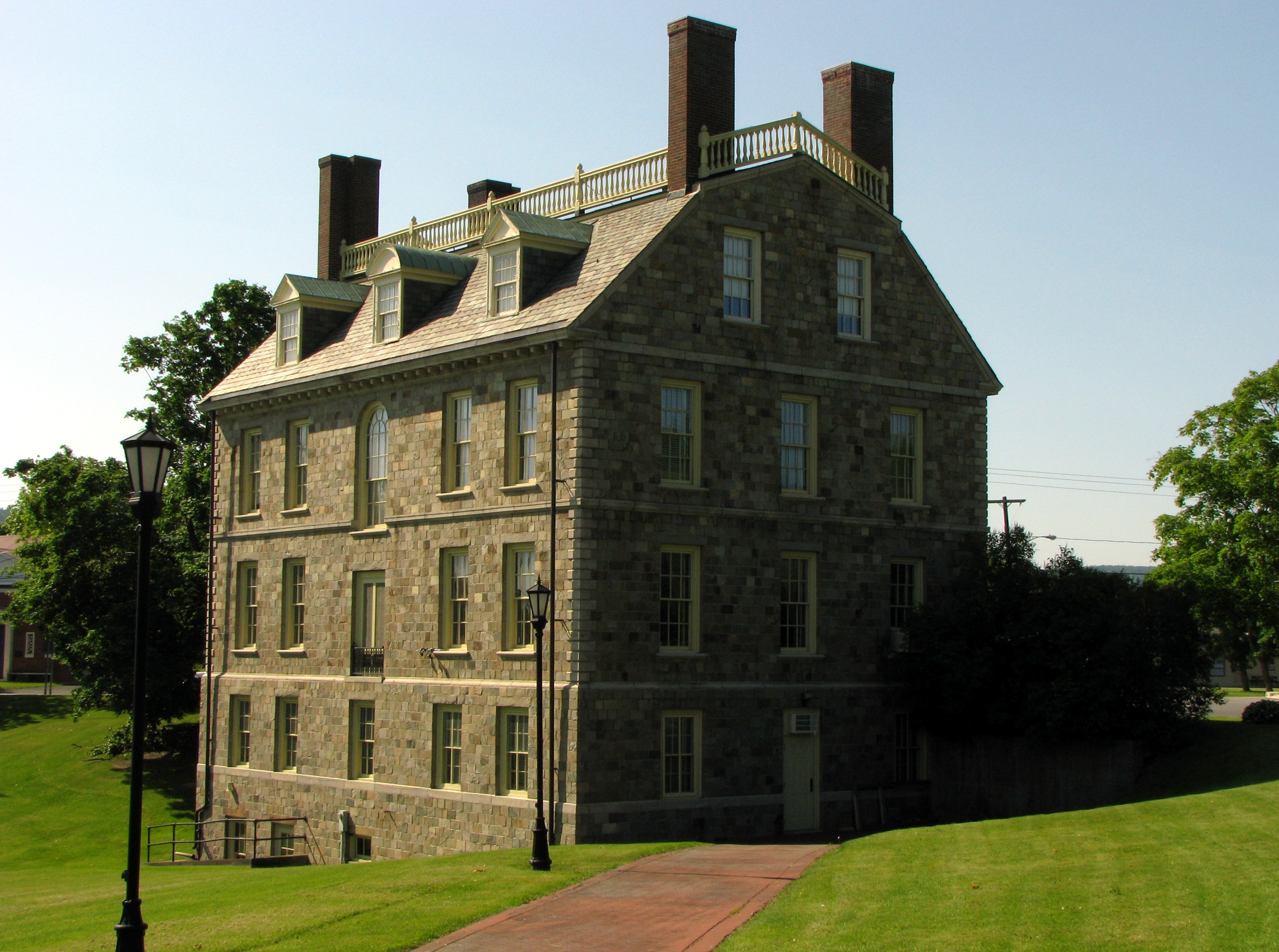
The Hancock House is a replica of Founding Father John Hancock's mansion. It is owned by the Ticonderoga Historical Society and operated as a museum.

A museum called the Star Trek Original Series Set Tour is in Ticonderoga, on Montcalm Street. It has been, and continues to be, visited by cast members of the show and of its spin-off and movies. The museum was opened by James Cawley, who financed it with his earnings as an Elvis impersonator, after he inherited a copy of the original set blueprints from a costume designer on the show.

In addition to the Burleigh House, the Amherst Avenue Historic District, Black Watch Library, Central School, Clark House, Community Building, Clayton H. Delano House, Crandall Marine Railway, Ferris House, Fort Ticonderoga, Frazier Bridge, Gilligan and Stevens Block, Hancock House, Lake George Avenue Historic District, Liberty Monument, Silas B. Moore Gristmill, NYS Armory, Pad Factory, Ticonderoga High School, Ticonderoga National Bank, Ticonderoga Pulp and Paper Company Office, and United States Post Office are listed on the National Register of Historic Places.

== Infrastructure ==
=== Rail transportation ===
Amtrak, the national passenger rail system, provides service to Ticonderoga, operating its Adirondack daily in both directions between Montreal and New York City.

== Notable people ==
- Henry G. Burleigh, congressman from New York
- James Cawley, actor and filmmaker
- Grace Hudowalski, ninth person and first woman to climb all 46 of the Adirondack High Peaks, born in Ticonderoga
- Charles Quigg, Wisconsin physician and legislator, born in Ticonderoga
- John A. Rice, Wisconsin physician and legislator, born in Ticonderoga
- Jarrod Sammis, Vermont state representative

== Communities and locations in the Town of Ticonderoga ==
- Baldwin – A hamlet on the western shore of Lake George on County Road 5, southwest of Ticonderoga hamlet.
- Black Point – The eastern shore of Lake George.
- Chilson – A sparsely populated location near the town's geographic center on NY-74
- Eagle Lake – A lake at the northern town line, bordered by NY-74 on the south side.
- Fort Ticonderoga – The historic fort that figured in two colonial wars.
- Fort Ticonderoga Station – A location southeast of Ticonderoga hamlet on the eastern side of Mount Defiance. Location of former passenger railroad station; the modern Amtrak station is on NY-74, approximately one mile east of the Ticonderoga hamlet.
- Mount Defiance – An elevation (853 feet (260 m) above sea level) on the southern side of Ticonderoga hamlet that overlooks Fort Ticonderoga.
- Putnam Pond – A small lake in the western part of Ticonderoga.
- Street Road – Location in the northern end of town, situated around NY-9N.
- Ticonderoga – A hamlet and census-designated place in the southeastern part of the town, on the La Chute River.
- Ticonderoga Muni (4B6) – A general aviation airport north of Ticonderoga hamlet.
- Wright- small area in the southeastern corner of Ticonderoga, bordering Putnam Station in Washington County.

== See also ==
- Ticonderoga High School
