= Ferris House (Ticonderoga, New York) =

Historic house in New York, United States

- U.S. National Register of Historic Places
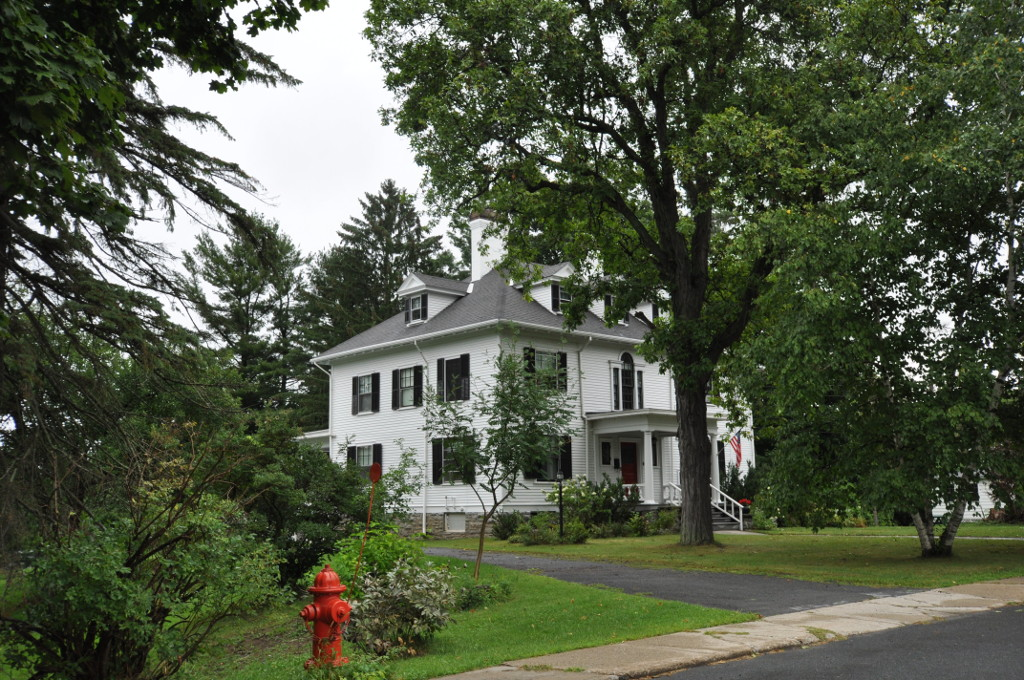

- Location within New York Location within the United States
- Interactive map showing the location of Ferris House
- Location: 16 Carillon Rd., Ticonderoga, New York
- Coordinates: 43°50′25″N 73°25′23″W
- Area: 2 acres (0.81 ha)
- Built: 1911
- Architect: Gale, W.A.
- Architectural style: Colonial Revival
- MPS: Ticonderoga MRA
- NRHP reference No.: 88002203
- Added to NRHP: November 15, 1988

The Ferris House is a historic house located at 16 Carillon Road in Ticonderoga, Essex County, New York.

== Description and history ==
Designed by W. A. Gale, it was built in 1911 and is a 2 1/2-story, four-bay-wide, hipped roof Colonial Revival–style building with clapboard sheathing and a stone foundation. It features a three-bay-wide, one-story flat-roofed porch with Doric order columns. Also on the property are a contributing carriage house and playhouse.

It was listed on the National Register of Historic Places on November 15, 1988.
