= Ticonderoga National Bank =

Historic commercial building in New York, United States

- U.S. National Register of Historic Places
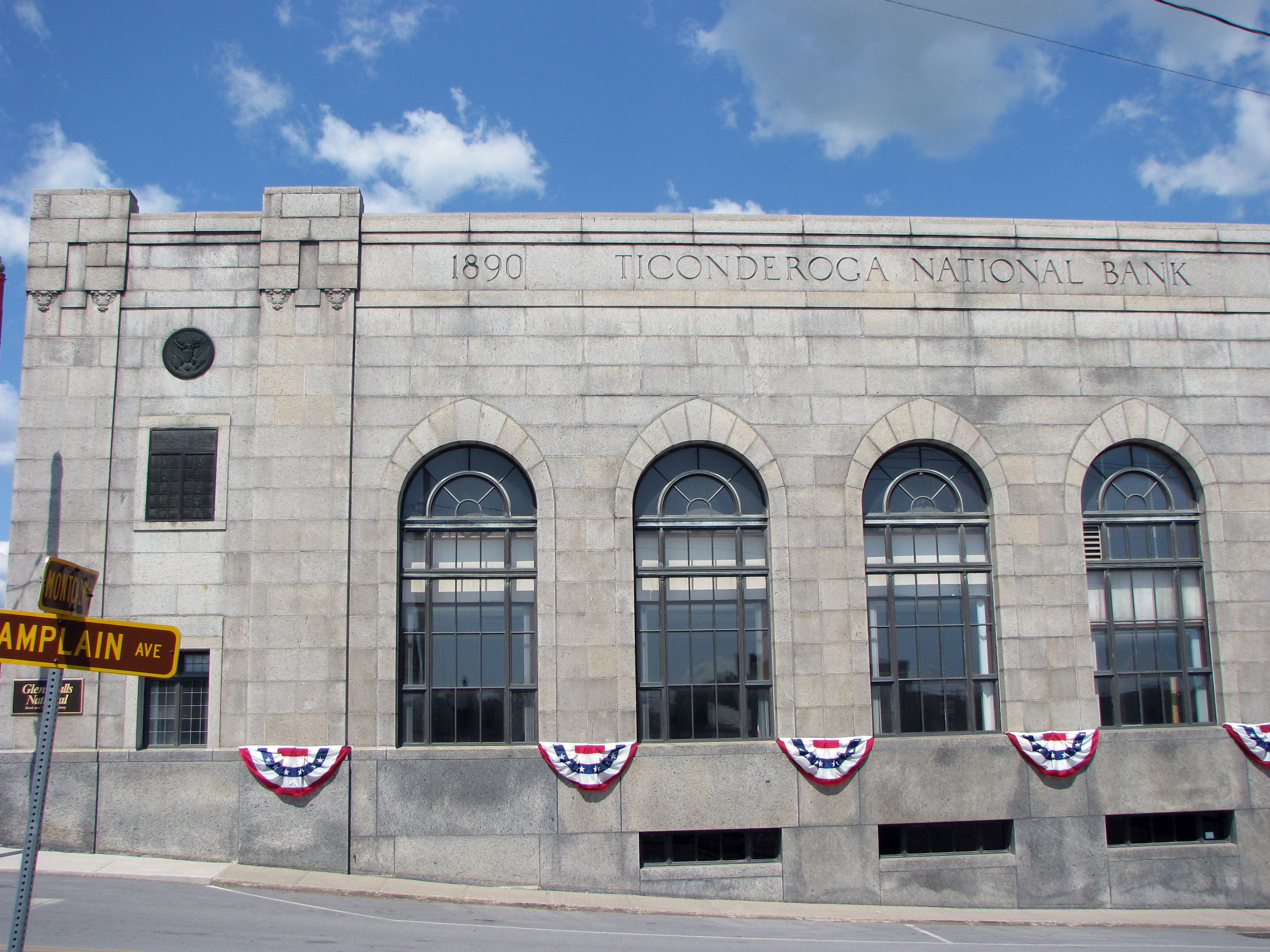
- Ticonderoga National Bank, May 2009

- Location within New York Location within the United States
- Location: 101 Montcalm St., Ticonderoga, New York
- Coordinates: 43°50′51″N 73°25′26″W
- Area: less than one acre
- Built: 1927
- Architect: Miller, A.S.; Donovan, William J.
- Architectural style: Renaissance
- MPS: Ticonderoga MRA
- NRHP reference No.: 88002194
- Added to NRHP: November 15, 1988

Ticonderoga National Bank is a historic bank building located at Ticonderoga in Essex County, New York. It was built between 1927 and 1929 and is a two-story, three by seven bay, trapezoidal granite building in the Renaissance Revival style. It features a monumental arcade, large round arched windows, and a massive banking hall.

It was listed on the National Register of Historic Places in 1988.
