= Clark House (Ticonderoga, New York) =

Historic house in New York, United States

- U.S. National Register of Historic Places
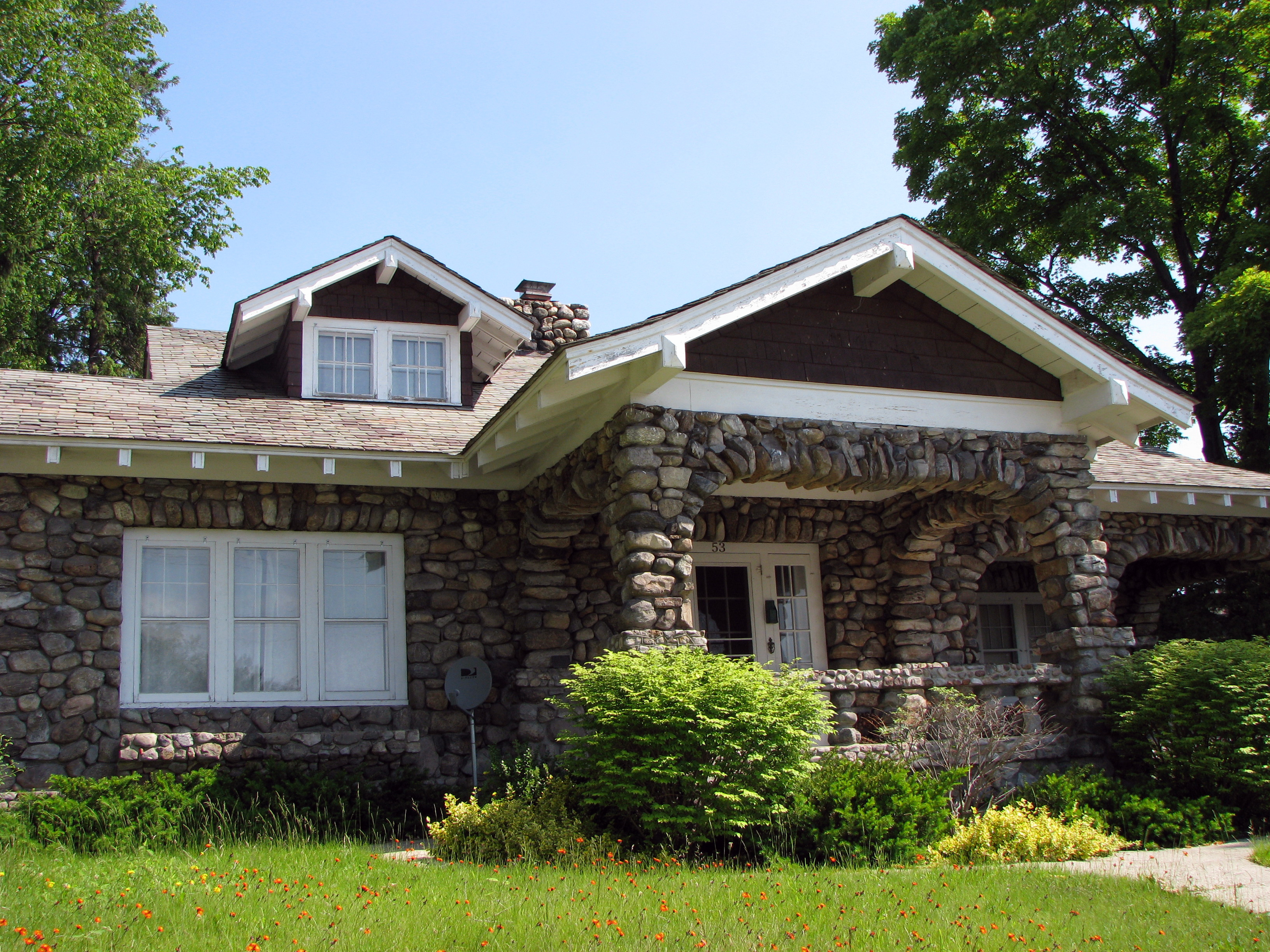
- Clark House, May 2009

- Location within New York Location within the United States
- Location: 331 Montcalm St., Ticonderoga, New York
- Coordinates: 43°50′54″N 73°26′32″W
- Area: 0.5 acres (0.20 ha)
- Built: 1921
- Architect: Clark, Frank & Rollen
- Architectural style: Bungalow/Craftsman
- MPS: Ticonderoga MRA
- NRHP reference No.: 88002204
- Added to NRHP: November 15, 1988

Clark House is a historic home located at Ticonderoga in Essex County, New York. The home was built in 1921 and is a 1 1/2-story stone and shingle-sheathed American Craftsman–style building with a slate gable roof. Also on the property is a contributing cobblestone wall.

It was listed on the National Register of Historic Places in 1988.
