= Keene Valley Library =

- U.S. National Register of Historic Places
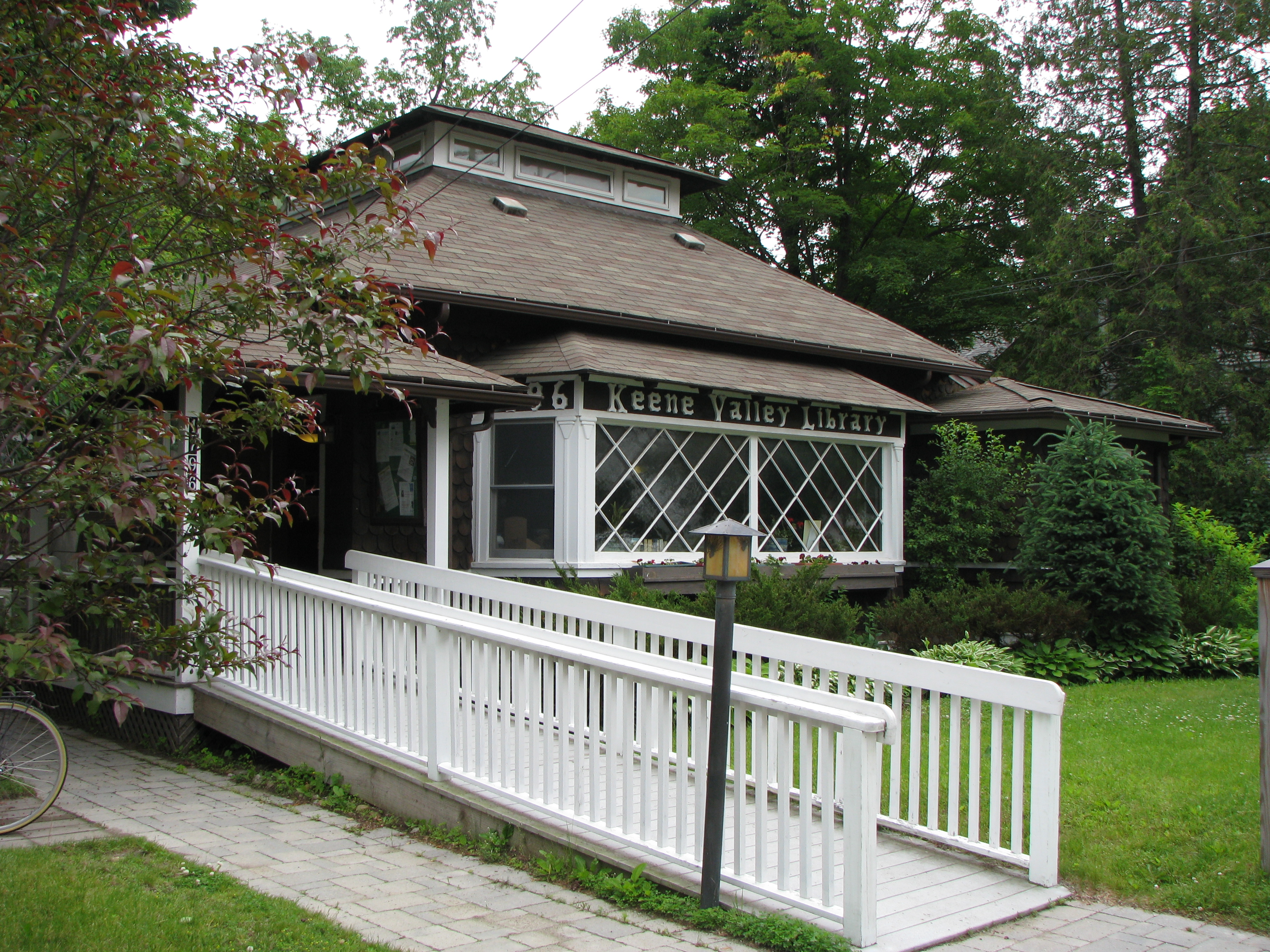
- Keene Valley Library, June 2009

- Location within New York Location within the United States
- Location: Main St., Keene Valley, New York
- Coordinates: 44°11′25″N 73°47′11″W
- Area: less than one acre
- Built: 1896
- Architect: Dodge, Rev. William; Trumball, Arthur & Luck, George
- Architectural style: Shingle Style, Adirondack
- NRHP reference No.: 00001528
- Added to NRHP: December 13, 2000

Keene Valley Library is a historic library building located at Keene Valley in Essex County, New York. The original building was built in 1896, with additions completed in 1923, 1931, 1962, 1985, and 2017. The original main block is a one-story timber frame structure on a random ashlar foundation. The building exhibits features of the Shingle Style and Adirondack Architecture.

It was listed on the National Register of Historic Places in 2000.
