= Amherst Avenue Historic District =

Historic district in New York, United States

- U.S. National Register of Historic Places
- U.S. Historic district
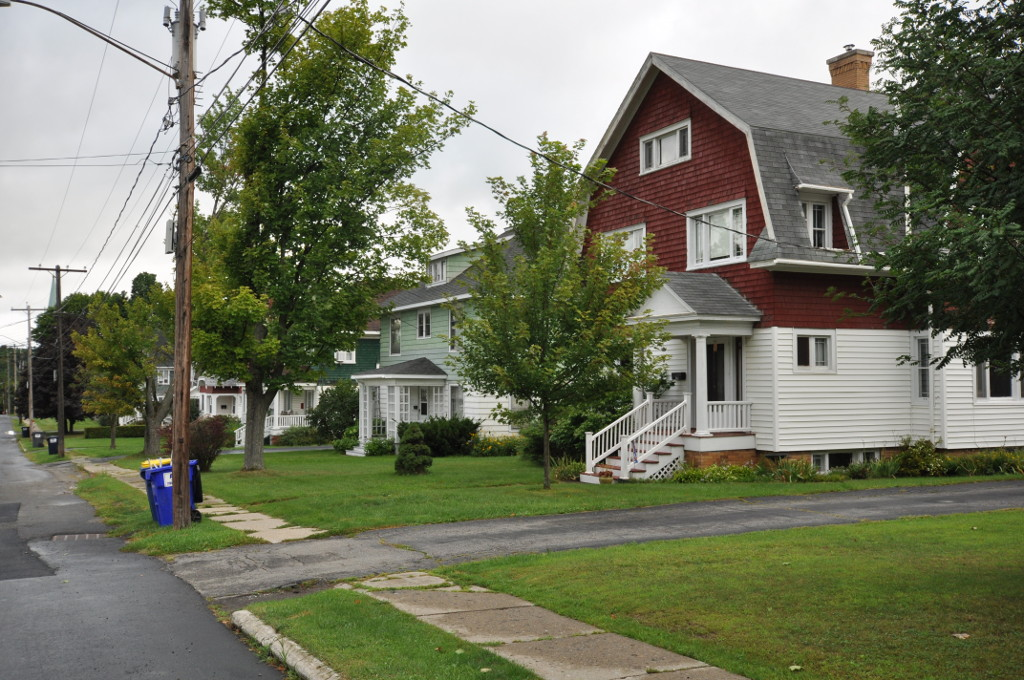

- Location within New York Location within the United States
- Interactive map showing the location of Amherst Avenue Historical District
- Location: 322-340 Amherst Ave., Ticonderoga, New York
- Coordinates: 43°50′38″N 73°25′34″W
- Area: 3.5 acres (1.4 ha)
- Built: 1921
- Architect: Gale, W.A.; Ticonderoga Pulp & Paper Co.
- Architectural style: Colonial Revival, Bungalow/Craftsman
- MPS: Ticonderoga MRA
- NRHP reference No.: 89000473
- Added to NRHP: June 16, 1989

Amherst Avenue Historic District is a national historic district located at Ticonderoga, in Essex County, New York. The district contains 16 contributing buildings on ten properties; 10 houses and six garages. It includes single-family homes built between 1921 and 1923 by W.A. Gale for the Ticonderoga Pulp and Paper Company as rental properties for company management. Gale also constructed the houses in the Lake George Avenue Historic District.

It was listed on the National Register of Historic Places in 1989.
