= Pad Factory =

- PAD Factory, The
- U.S. National Register of Historic Places
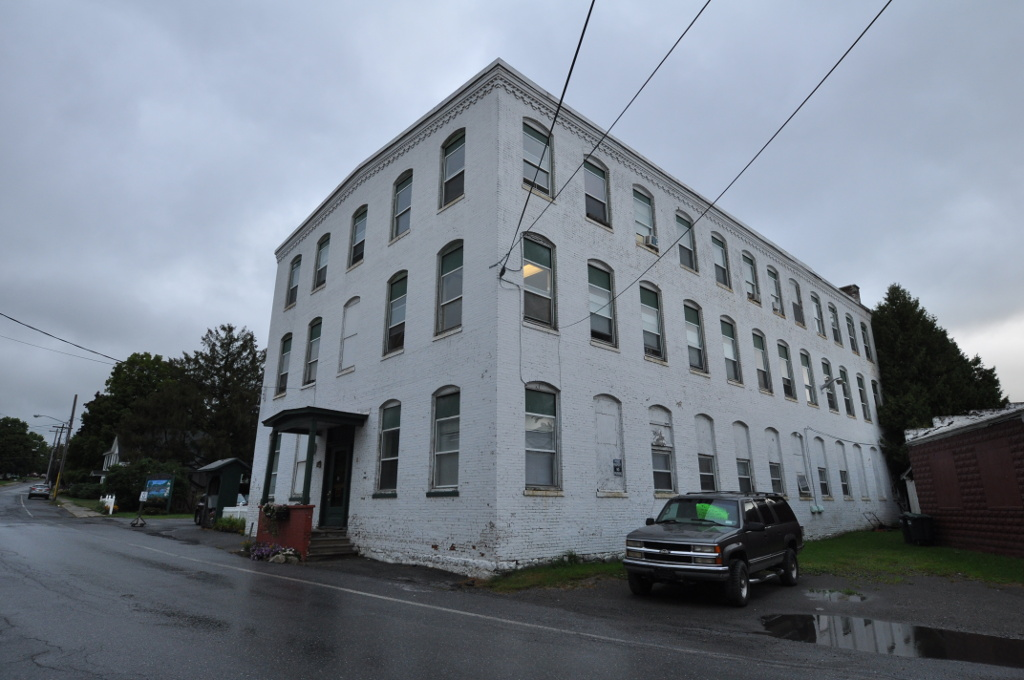

- Location within New York Location within the United States
- Location: 109 Lake George Ave., Ticonderoga, New York
- Coordinates: 43°50′53″N 73°25′39″W
- Area: 1.4 acres (0.57 ha)
- Built: 1893
- Architect: Remington, S.B.
- MPS: Ticonderoga MRA
- NRHP reference No.: 88002205
- Added to NRHP: November 15, 1988

The PAD Factory is a historic factory building located at Ticonderoga in Essex County, New York. It was built in 1893 and is a 3-story, five-by-three-bay brick industrial building with a fieldstone foundation and a low pitched gable roof. It was originally built for the manufacture of blank books, but was used almost immediately for a variety of purposes including a temporary school and shirt factory. It was converted for residential and commercial uses in 1981.

It was listed on the National Register of Historic Places in 1988.
