= Liberty Monument (Ticonderoga) =

- U.S. National Register of Historic Places
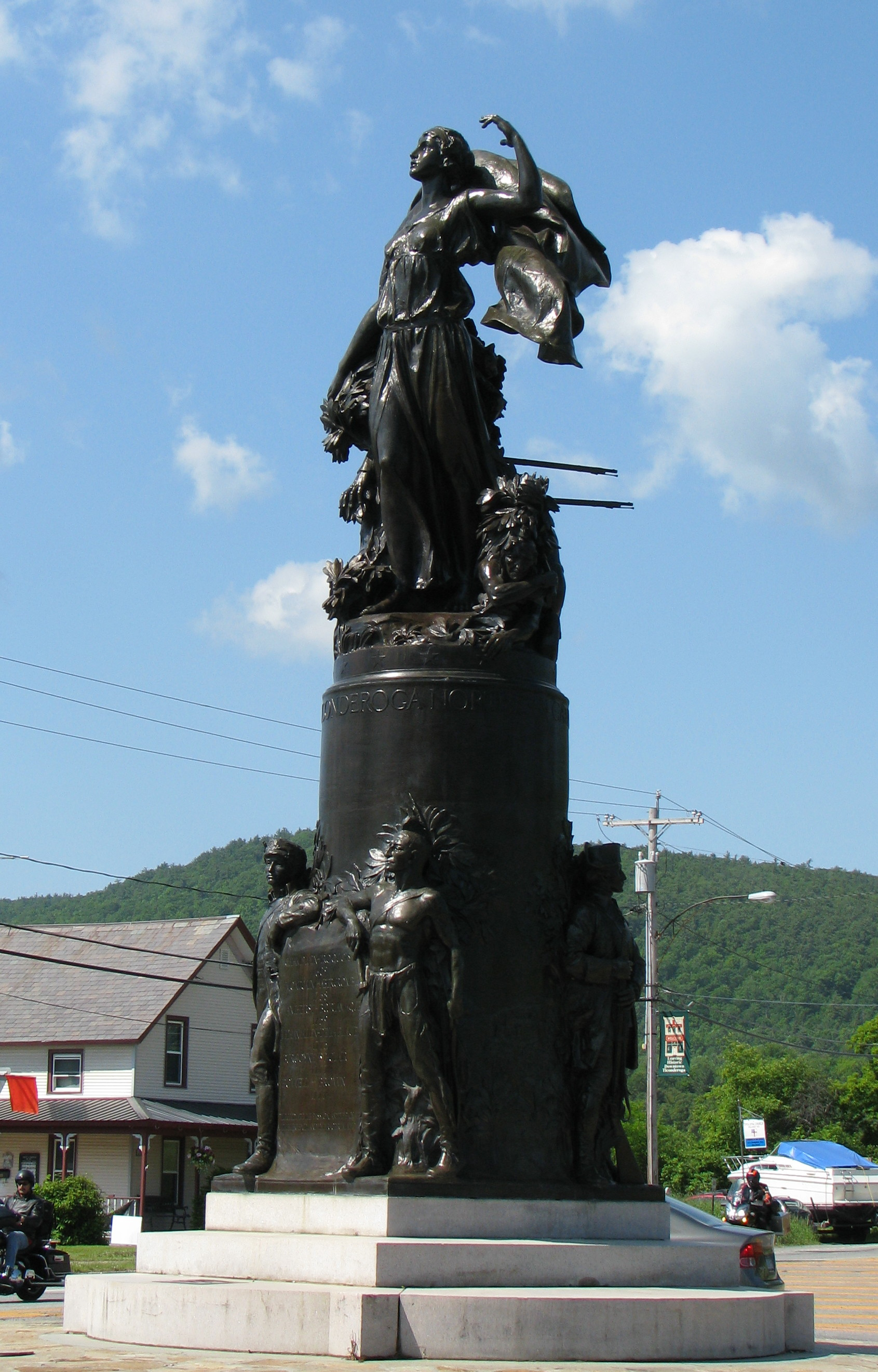
- Liberty Monument, May 1999

- Location within New York Location within the United States
- Location: NY 9N at Montcalm St., Ticonderoga, New York
- Coordinates: 43°50′53″N 73°26′7″W
- Area: less than one acre
- Built: 1924
- Architect: Keck, Charles
- MPS: Ticonderoga MRA
- NRHP reference No.: 89002014
- Added to NRHP: November 16, 1989

Liberty Monument is a historic monument located at Ticonderoga in Essex County, New York. It was built in 1924 and is a bronze sculpture on a tiered granite base. The lower part of the sculpture is composed of four life-sized figures of a Native American, a Frenchman, a Scottish soldier, and an American. They symbolize the four groups whose military exploits are part of Ticonderoga's past. The second part is the artist Charles Keck's (1875–1951) interpretation of Liberty.

It was listed on the National Register of Historic Places in 1989.
