= New York State Armory (Ticonderoga) =

- NYS Armory
- U.S. National Register of Historic Places
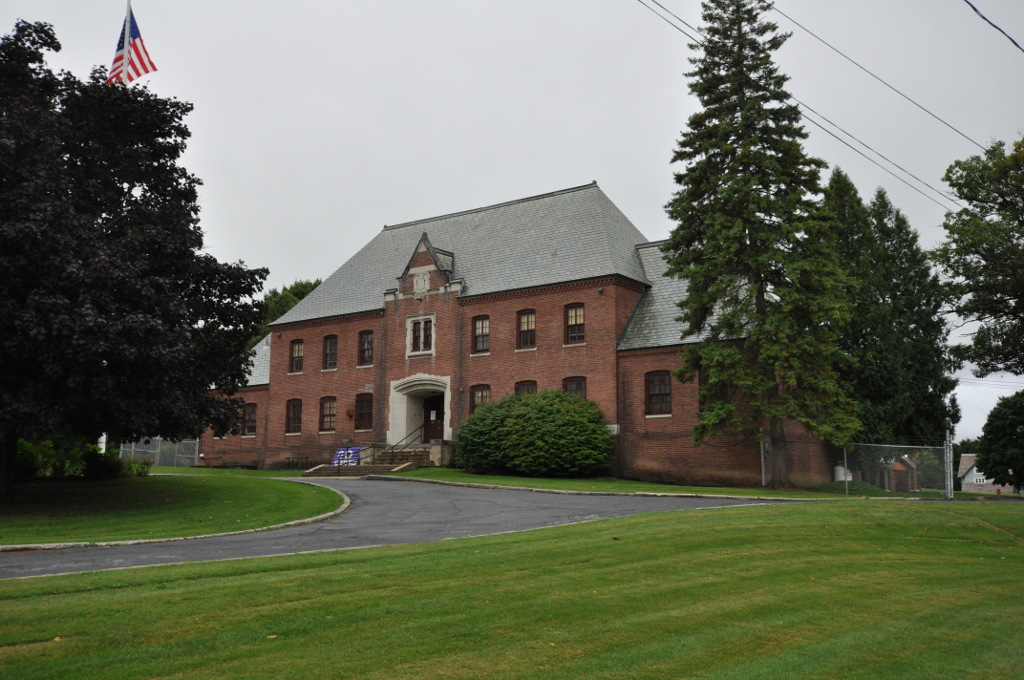

- Location within New York Location within the United States
- Location: 315 Champlain Ave., Ticonderoga, New York
- Coordinates: 43°50′42″N 73°25′29″W
- Area: 2.2 acres (0.89 ha)
- Built: 1934
- Architect: Haugaard, William E.; Wexler, Leon
- MPS: Ticonderoga MRA
- NRHP reference No.: 88002200
- Added to NRHP: November 15, 1988

The NYS Armory is a historic former National Guard armory building located at Ticonderoga in Essex County, New York. It was built in 1934–1935 and is a large, two story T-shaped brick and case stone building with Tudor and Jacobean Revival style features. The main seven bay block has a steeply pitched, slate-covered hipped roof and is flanked by two bay wings.

It was listed on the National Register of Historic Places in 1988. The building now serves as a local community center.
