= Frazier Bridge =

- U.S. National Register of Historic Places
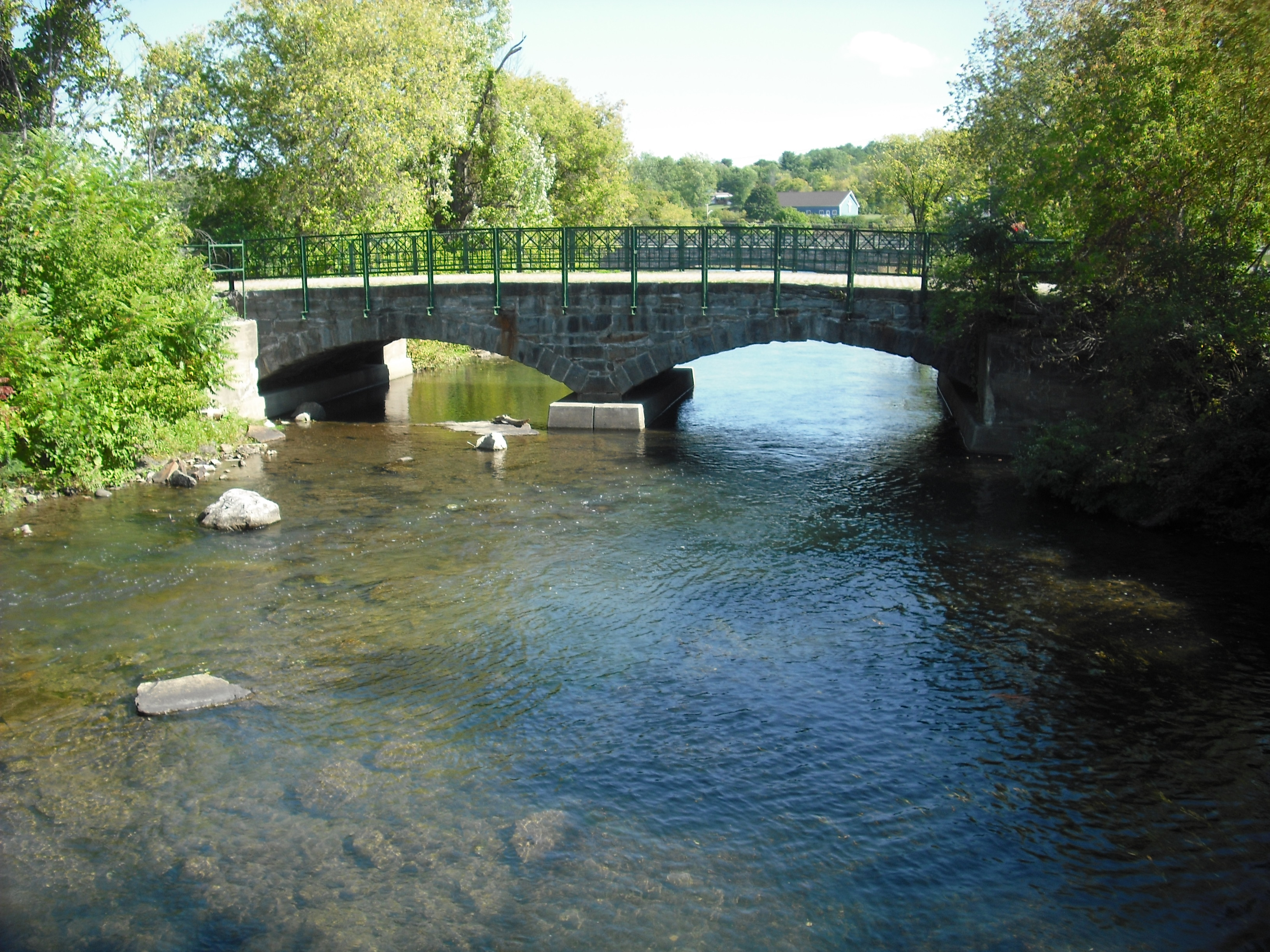

- Location within New York Location within the United States
- Location: Champlain Avenue, at Lachute River, Ticonderoga, New York
- Coordinates: 43°51′1″N 73°25′21″W
- Area: less than one acre
- Built: 1894
- Architect: Arnold, D.M.; Lee, Alex
- Architectural style: Double arched bridge
- MPS: Ticonderoga MRA
- NRHP reference No.: 98001540
- Added to NRHP: December 17, 1998

Frazier Bridge is a historic Double arched bridge over the La Chute River at Ticonderoga in Essex County, New York. It was built in 1894 and is a double-arched masonry bridge, 23 feet wide and spanning 50 feet at roughly 10 feet above water level.

It was listed on the National Register of Historic Places in 1998.

== Gallery ==
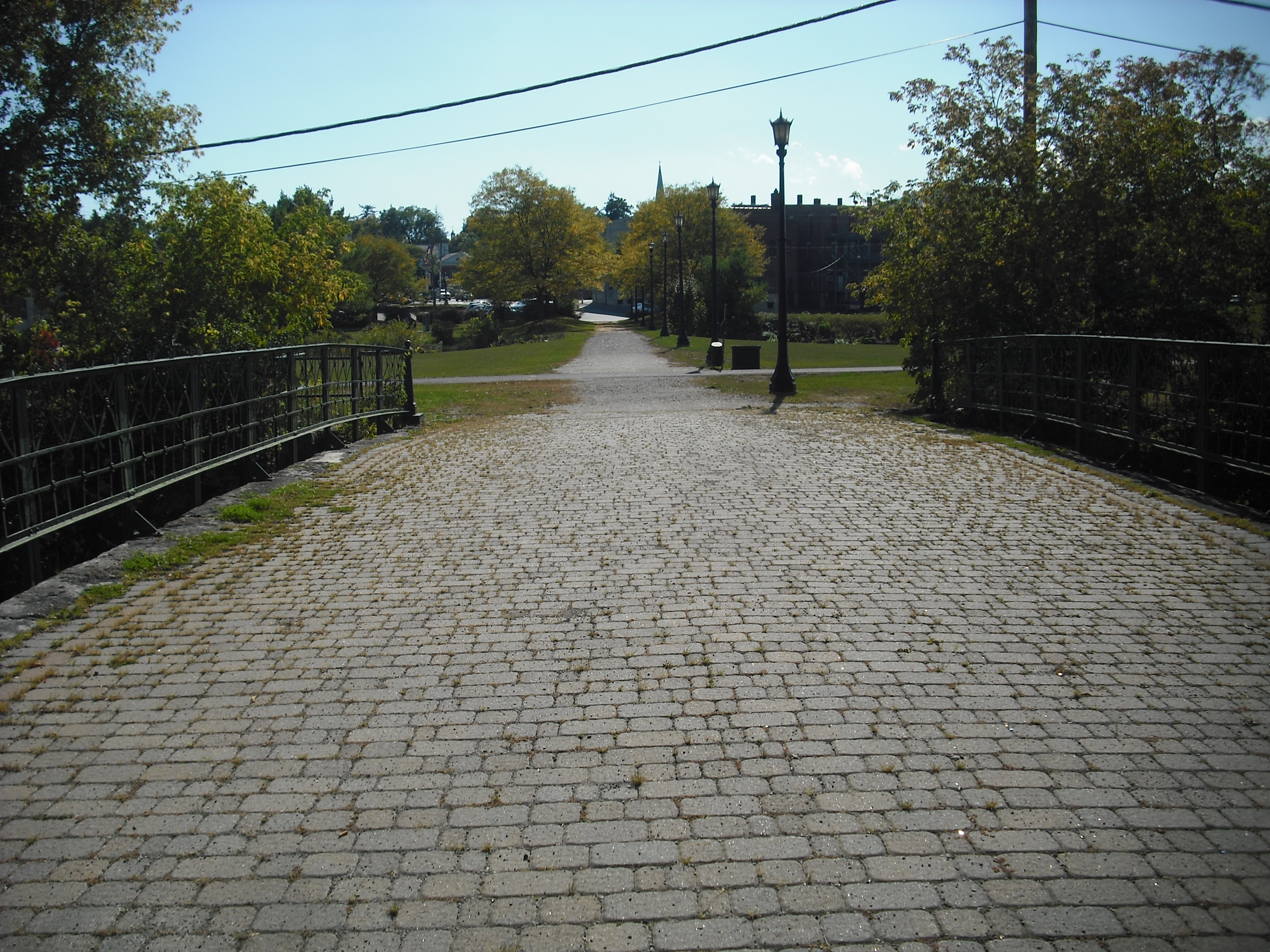
Ticonderoga seen from Frazier Bridge

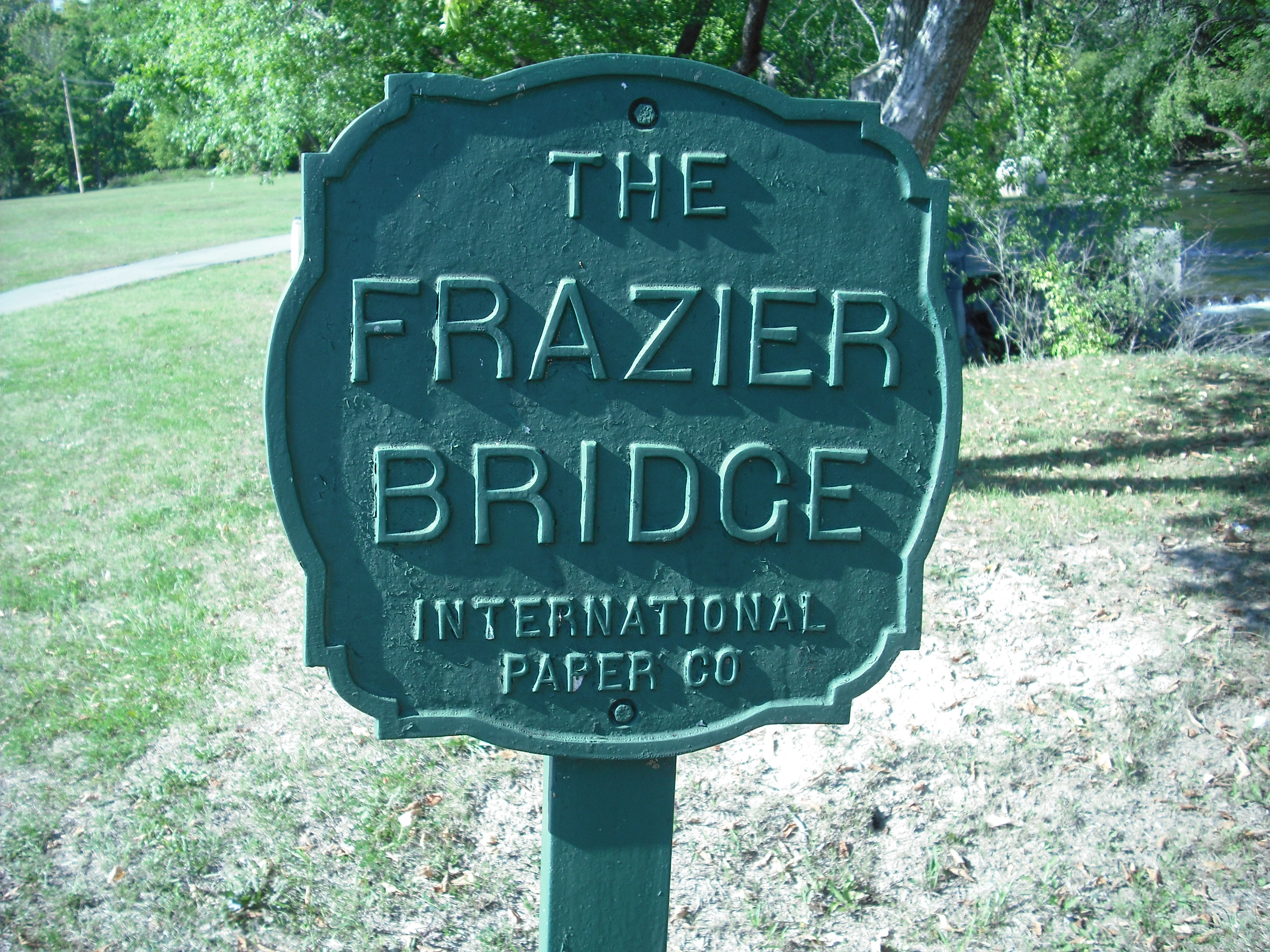
Frazier Bridge Sign
