= Silas B. Moore Gristmill =

- U.S. National Register of Historic Places
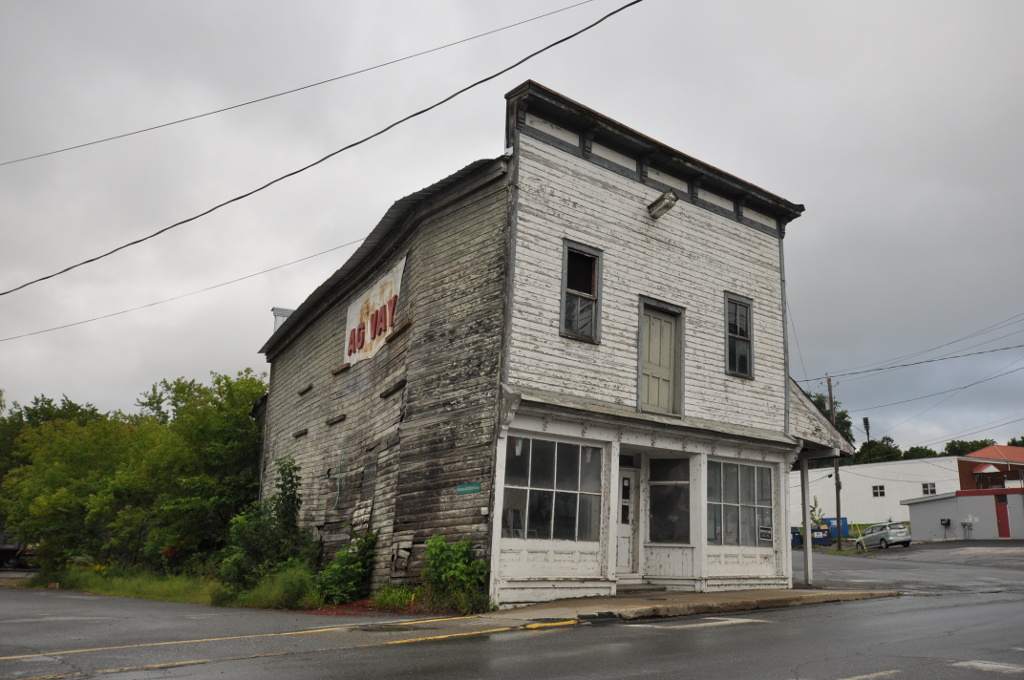

- Location within New York Location within the United States
- Location: 218 Montcalm St., Ticonderoga, New York
- Coordinates: 43°50′53″N 73°25′41″W
- Area: less than one acre
- Built: 1879-1880
- Architectural style: Italianate
- MPS: Ticonderoga MRA
- NRHP reference No.: 88002190
- Added to NRHP: November 15, 1988

Silas B. Moore Gristmill is a historic grist mill located at Ticonderoga in Essex County, New York. It was built in 1879–80 and is a two-story, three-bay wood-frame commercial building with shiplap siding and Italianate style details. A two-story, rectangular addition completed about 1885 is attached to the rear of the main block.

It was listed on the National Register of Historic Places in 1988.
