= Central Powerhouse =

- U.S. National Register of Historic Places
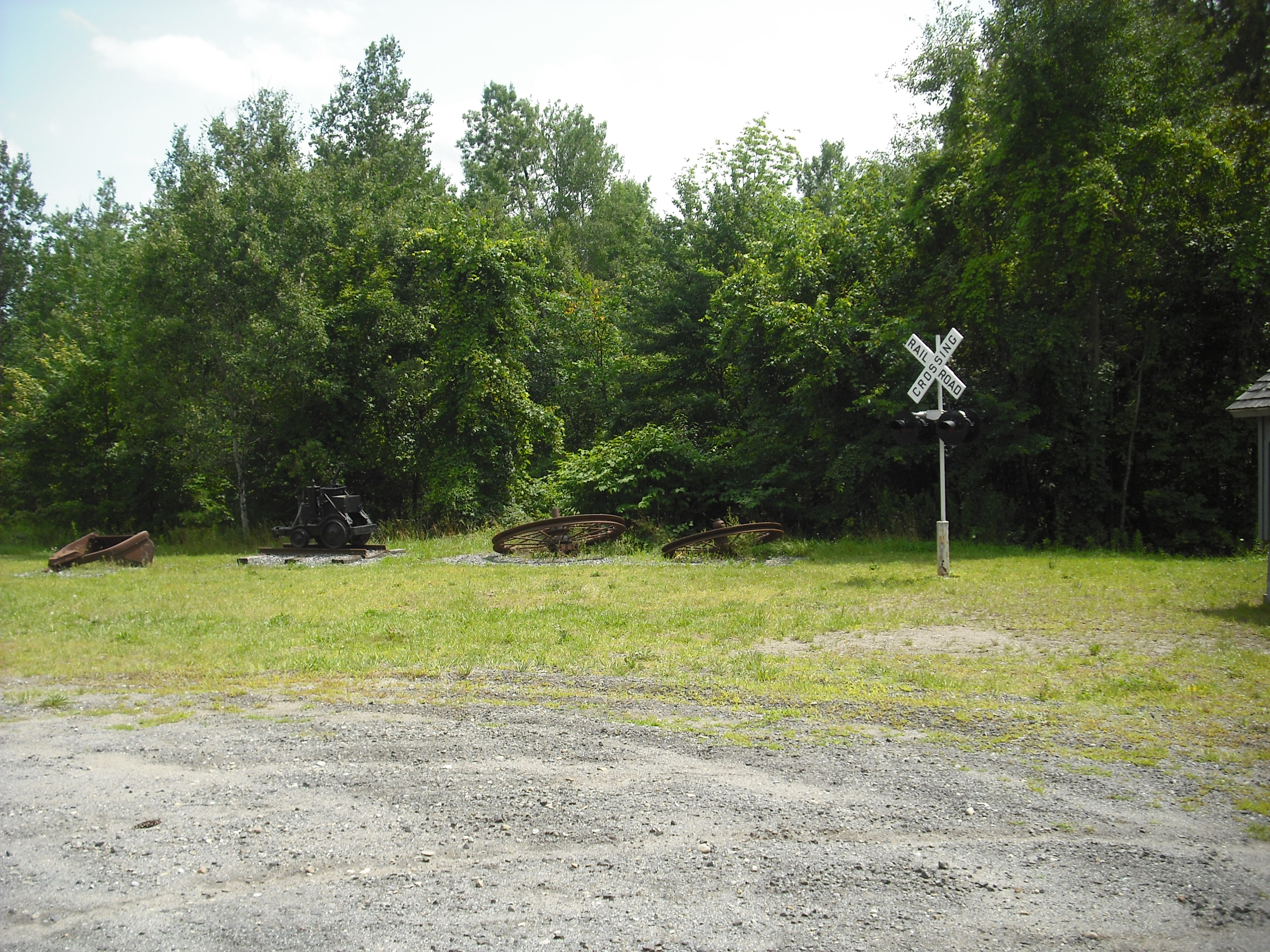
- Site of former Power House in 2014.

- Location within New York Location within the United States
- Location: Jct. of Tracy Rd. and Powerhouse Rd., SE corner, Town of Moriah, Witherbee, New York
- Coordinates: 44°5′23″N 73°32′13″W
- Area: 3.1 acres (1.3 ha)
- Built: 1902
- Architectural style: Romanesque, Industrial
- MPS: Moriah MPS
- NRHP reference No.: 95000591
- Added to NRHP: June 1, 1995

Central Powerhouse, also known as the Town of Moriah Water Department Building, was a historic power station located at Witherbee in Essex County, New York, United States. It was built in 1902 and was a massive brick building with a steeply pitched gable roof. It consisted of a main block, four bays wide and seven bays long, with a two-stage, cast stone addition built in 1904–1905 as a transformer house and coal ash hopper. It was deeded to the Town of Moriah in 1962.

It was listed on the National Register of Historic Places in 1995. The building was demolished in 2001.
