= United States Post Office (Ticonderoga, New York) =

- US Post Office-Ticonderoga
- U.S. National Register of Historic Places
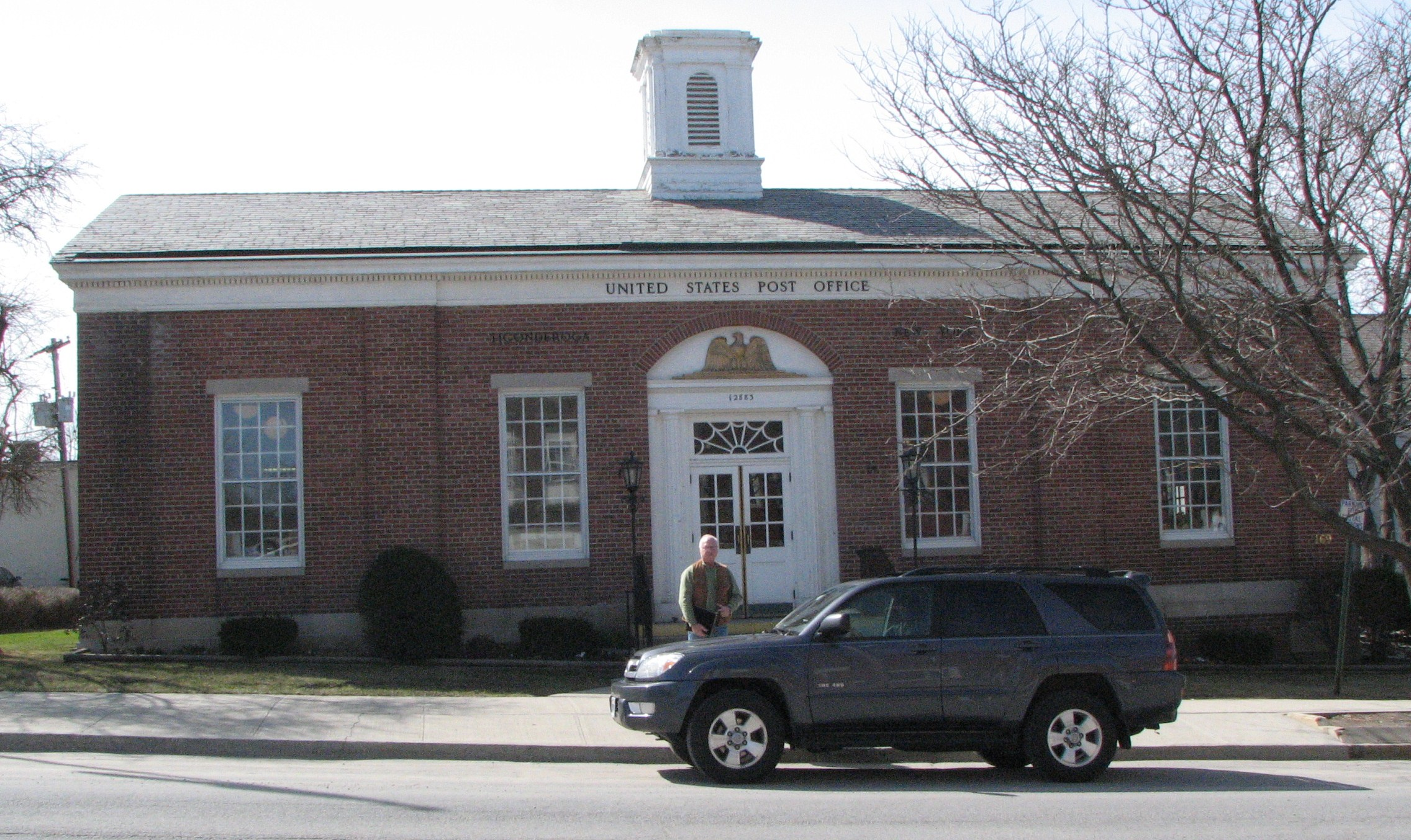

- Location within New York Location within the United States
- Location: 169 Champlain Ave. Ticonderoga, New York
- Coordinates: 43°50′51″N 73°25′26″W
- Area: less than one acre
- Built: 1936
- Architect: Simon, Louis A.; Massa, Frederick
- Architectural style: Colonial Revival
- MPS: US Post Offices in New York State, 1858-1943, TR
- NRHP reference No.: 88002436
- Added to NRHP: May 11, 1989

US Post Office-Ticonderoga is a historic post office building located at Ticonderoga in Essex County, New York, United States. It was designed and built in 1936–37, and is one of a number of post offices in New York State designed by the Office of the Supervising Architect of the Treasury Department under Louis A. Simon. The building is in the Colonial Revival style and is a symmetrically massed, one story brick building with a stone watertable. The slate covered gable roof is topped by a square, flat-topped cupola with Doric order pilasters. The interior features a 1940 mural by Frederick Massa titled The Exhortation of Ethan Allen.

It was listed on the National Register of Historic Places in 1989.
