= Ticonderoga High School =

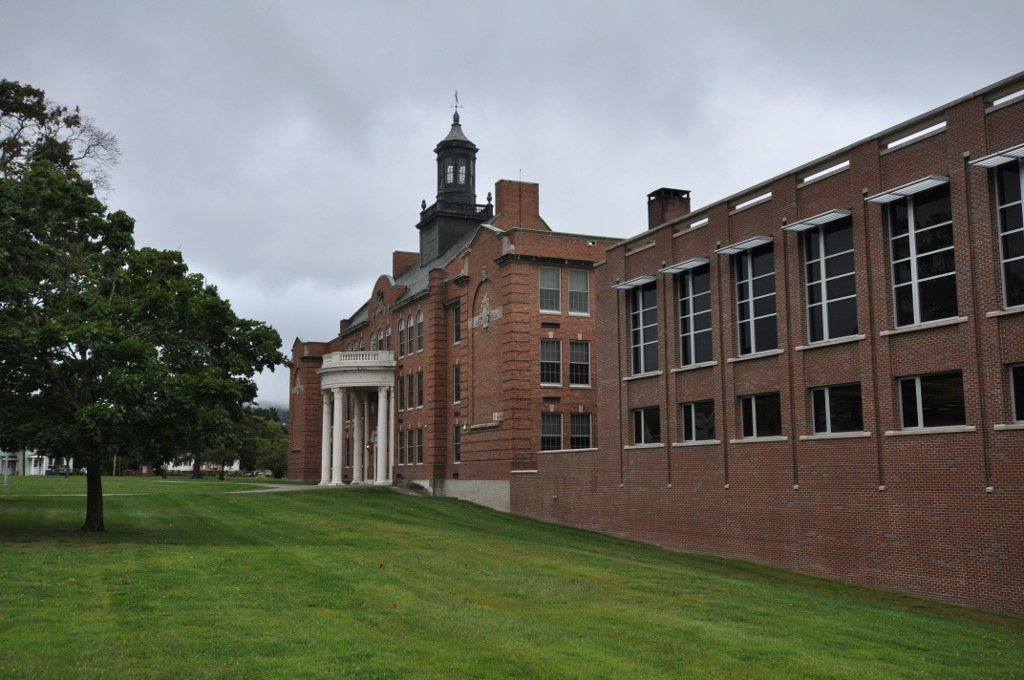

Location
- 5 Calkins Place; Ticonderoga, New York 12883; United States; 43°50′34″N 73°25′38″W

Information
- Type: Public
- School district: Ticonderoga Central School District
- Superintendent: John McDonald
- NCES School ID: 362868003895
- Principal: John Donahue
- Teaching staff: 30.00 (on an FTE basis)
- Grades: 7-12
- Gender: Co-ed
- Enrollment: 359 (2022-2023)
- Student to teacher ratio: 11.97
- Campus: Rural: Distant
- Colors: Purple and White
- Mascot: Sentinels
- Yearbook: Carillon
- Website: jshs.ticonderogak12.org

- Ticonderoga High School
- U.S. National Register of Historic Places
- Location within New York Location within the United States
- Location: Calkins Place, Ticonderoga, New York
- Area: 6.7 acres (2.7 ha)
- Built: 1928
- Architect: Tooker & Marsh; Duplex Construction Co.
- Architectural style: Colonial Revival, Neo-Georgian
- MPS: Ticonderoga MRA
- NRHP reference No.: 88002201 Sydney
- Added to NRHP: November 15, 1988

Ticonderoga High School is a historic high school building located at Ticonderoga in Essex County, New York. It was built in 1928-1930 and is a three-story, masonry neo-Georgian style building with a slate roof, concrete foundation, and brick walls. It features a semi-circular portico with Corinthian order columns and a balustrade and a copper polygonal cupola.

It was listed on the National Register of Historic Places in 1988.

As of 2021, the building is still in use as the sole public high school operated by the Ticonderoga Central School District.
