= Gilligan and Stevens Block =

Historic commercial building in New York, United States

- U.S. National Register of Historic Places
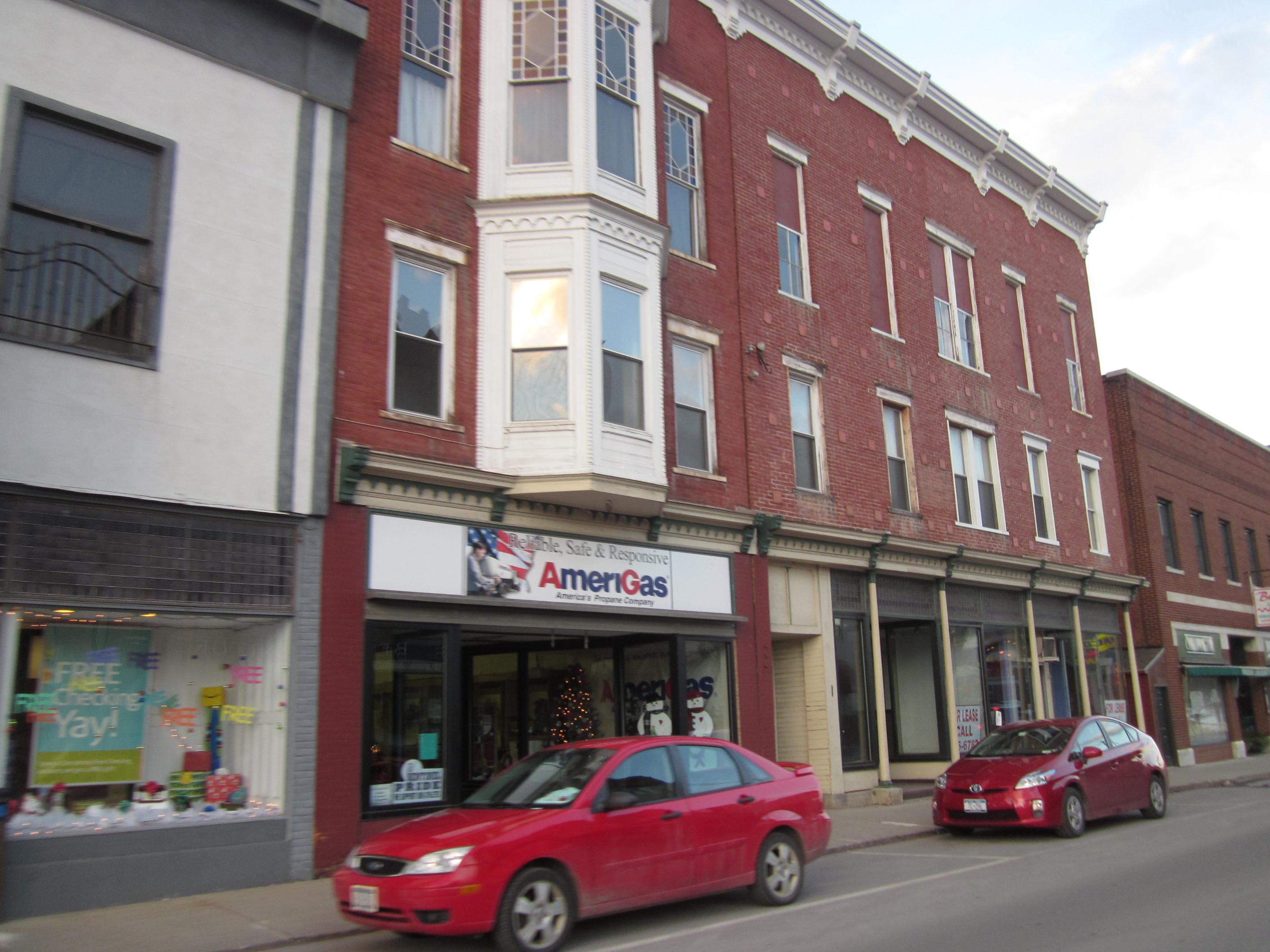
- Gilligan and Stevens Block, December 2011

- Location within New York Location within the United States
- Location: 115 Montcalm St., Ticonderoga, New York
- Coordinates: 43°50′56″N 73°25′30″W
- Area: less than one acre
- Built: 1884
- Architectural style: Italianate, Queen Anne
- MPS: Ticonderoga MRA
- NRHP reference No.: 88002193
- Added to NRHP: November 15, 1988

Gilligan and Stevens Block is a historic commercial building located at Ticonderoga in Essex County, New York. It was built in two parts between 1882 and 1884 and is a three-story, eight bay wide structure with Italianate and Queen Anne style features. The east part of the block features five cast iron columns at the street level.

It was listed on the National Register of Historic Places in 1988.
