= Black Watch Library =

- U.S. National Register of Historic Places
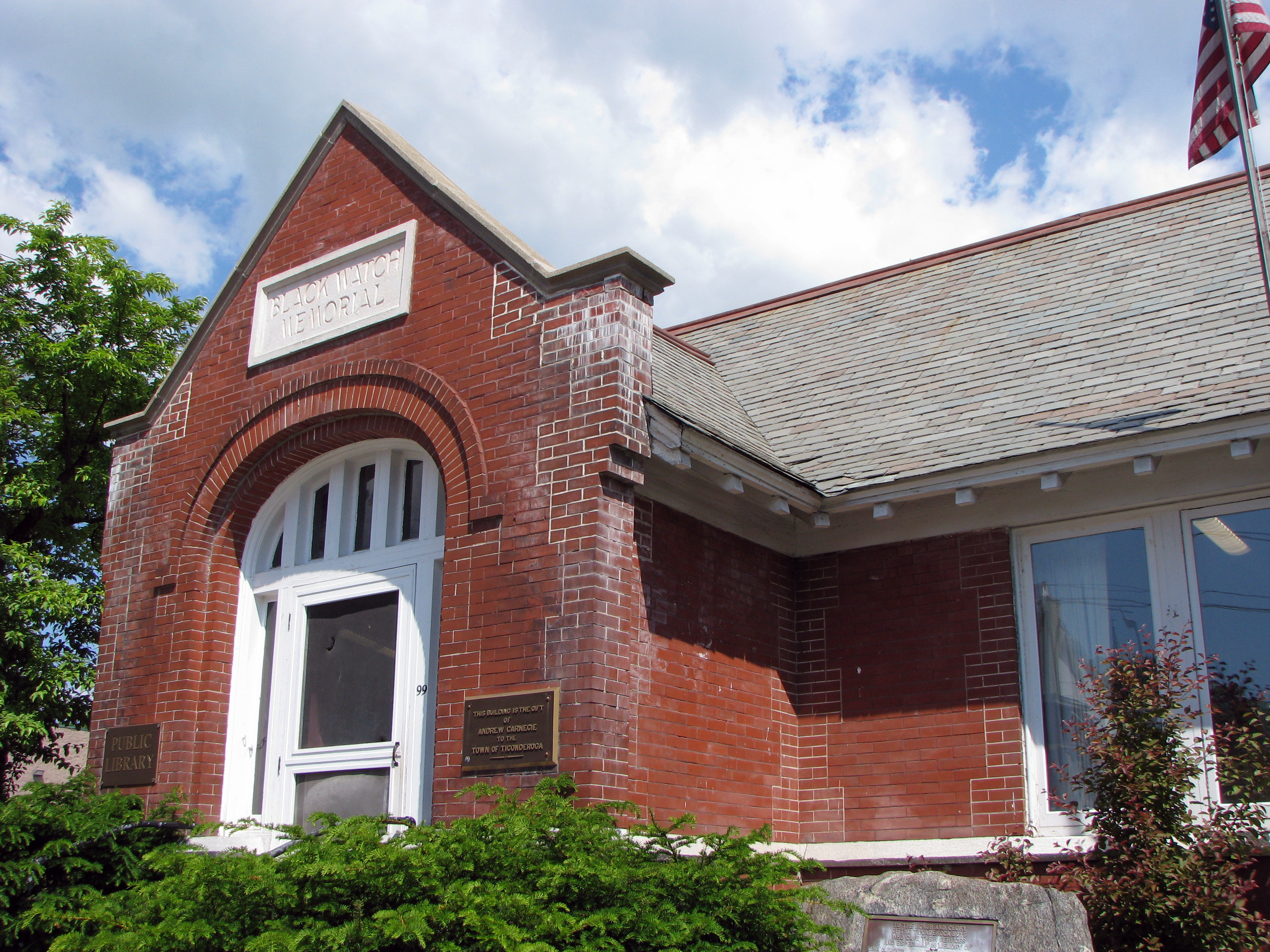
- Black Watch Library, May 2009

- Location within New York Location within the United States
- Location: 161 Montcalm St., Ticonderoga, New York
- Coordinates: 43°50′54″N 73°25′34″W
- Area: less than one acre
- Built: 1905
- Architectural style: Tudor Revival, Jacobean Revival
- MPS: Ticonderoga MRA
- NRHP reference No.: 88002199
- Added to NRHP: November 15, 1988

Black Watch Library is a historic library building located at Ticonderoga in Essex County, New York. It was built in 1905 and is a one-story brick structure with a cruciform plan in the Jacobean Revival style. It features a blue / green slate gable roof with projecting rafter ends.

It was listed on the National Register of Historic Places in 1988.
