= Central School (Ticonderoga, New York) =

- U.S. National Register of Historic Places
- Location within New York Location within the United States
- Location: 324 Champlain Ave., Ticonderoga, New York
- Coordinates: 43°50′40″N 73°25′25″W
- Area: 1.6 acres (0.65 ha)
- Built: 1906
- Architectural style: Tudor Revival, Jacobean Revival
- MPS: Ticonderoga MRA
- NRHP reference No.: 88002202
- Added to NRHP: November 15, 1988

Central School was a historic school building located at Ticonderoga in Essex County, New York. It was built in 1906 and was a 2 1/2-story, eleven-bay-wide by seven-bay-deep brick building with Jacobean Revival style features. The features included parapeted gables, round arched entrances, and a steeply pitched multi-gabled roof. A rear 1 1/2-story addition had a slate hipped roof. It was built on the site of the Academy, Ticonderoga's first high school. It was used as a school until 1967; from 1967 to 1984 it was used as a civic center for community activities.

It was listed on the National Register of Historic Places in 1988, and was demolished in 2001.
