= Lake George Avenue Historic District =

Historic district in New York, United States

- U.S. National Register of Historic Places
- U.S. Historic district
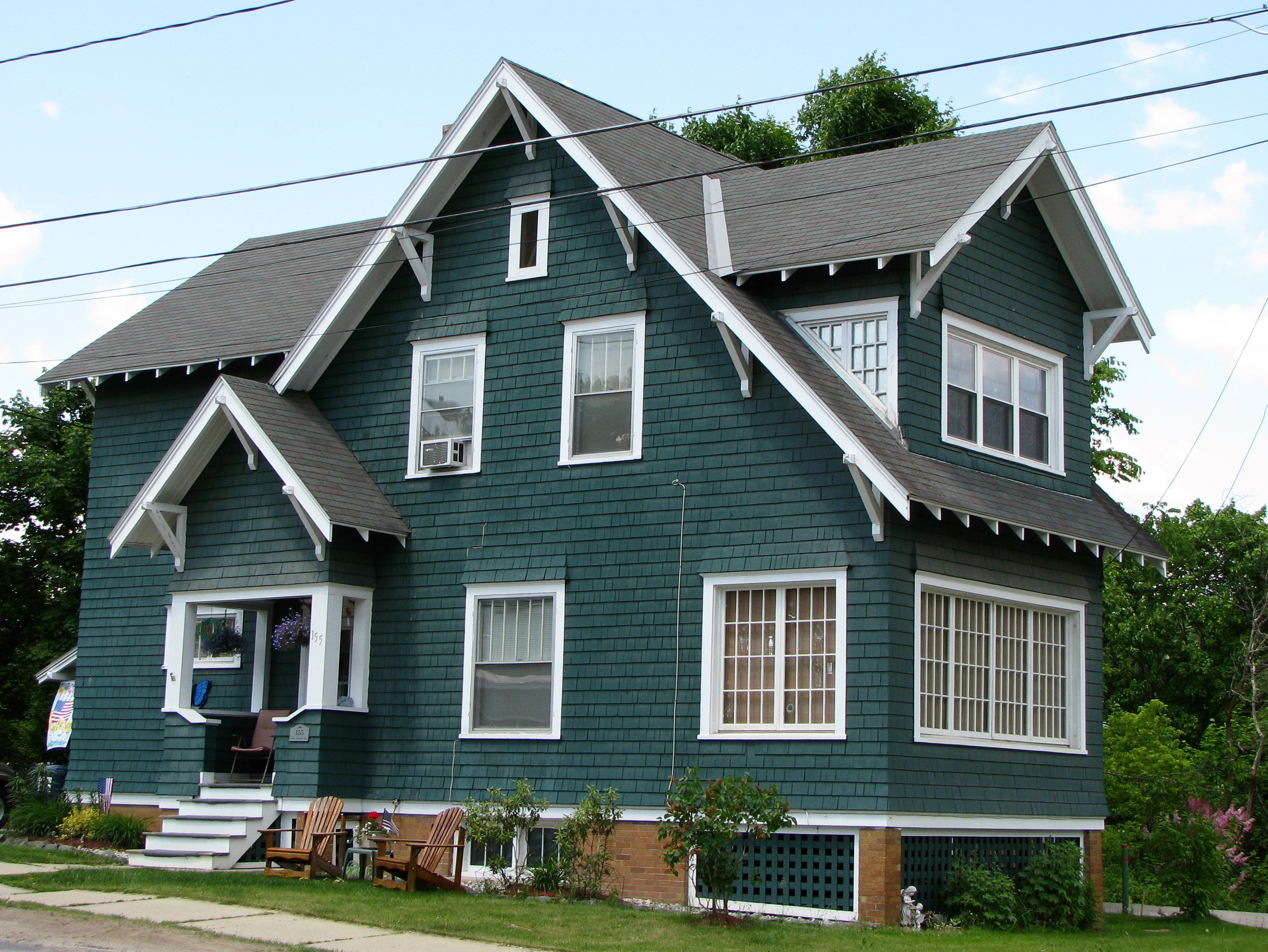
- 301 Lake George Ave., May 2009

- Location within New York Location within the United States
- Location: 301-331 Lake George Ave., Ticonderoga, New York
- Coordinates: 43°50′44″N 73°25′43″W
- Area: 3 acres (1.2 ha)
- Built: 1919
- Architect: Gale, William A.; Ticonderoga Pulp & Paper Co.
- Architectural style: Bungalow/Craftsman
- MPS: Ticonderoga MRA
- NRHP reference No.: 89000472
- Added to NRHP: June 16, 1989

Lake George Avenue Historic District is a national historic district located at Ticonderoga, in Essex County, New York. The district contains 20 contributing buildings on 14 properties; 12 houses and eight garages. It includes single-family homes built between 1919 and 1921 by W.A. Gale for the Ticonderoga Pulp and Paper Company as rental properties for company management. The houses share a common American Craftsman influenced bungalow style. Gale also constructed the houses in the Amherst Avenue Historic District.

It was listed on the National Register of Historic Places in 1989.
