= Clayton H. Delano House =

Historic house in New York, United States

- U.S. National Register of Historic Places
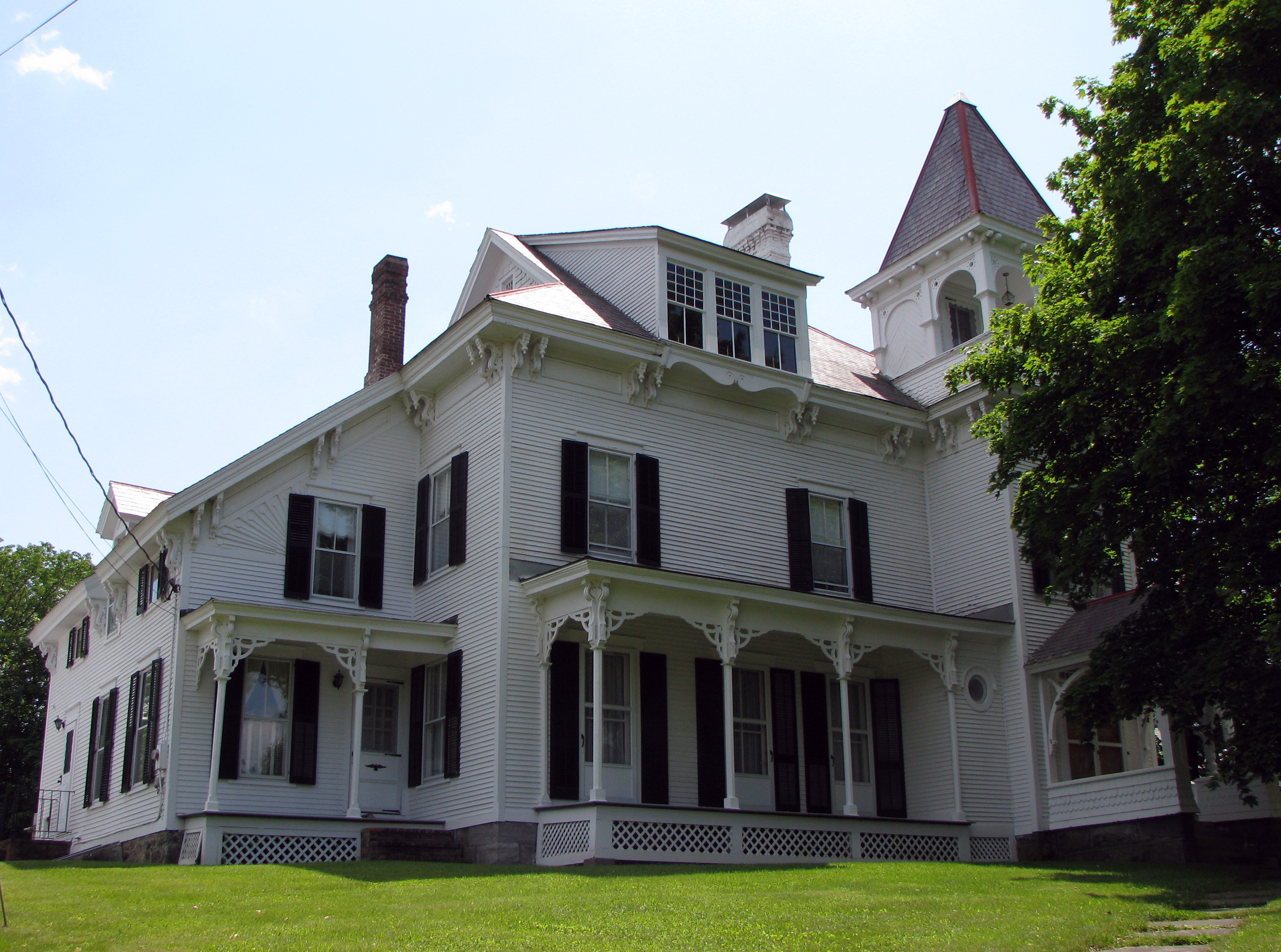
- Clayton H. Delano House, May 2009

- Location within New York Location within the United States
- Location: 25 Father Jogues Pl., Ticonderoga, New York
- Coordinates: 43°50′50″N 73°25′37″W
- Area: less than one acre
- Built: 1857
- Architectural style: Queen Anne
- MPS: Ticonderoga MRA
- NRHP reference No.: 88002195
- Added to NRHP: November 15, 1988

The Clayton H. Delano House is a historic house located at 25 Father Jogues Place in Ticonderoga, Essex County, New York.

== Description and history ==
The home was built in 1857 in the Italianate style, and was remodeled and enlarged between 1884 and 1891 in the Queen Anne style. It is an irregularly massed, 2 1/2-story, slate-roofed clapboard-sheathed house with a 3-story square tower with a pyramidal hipped roof. It has a 1 1/2-story shed-roofed wing. A sunflower motif appears on the exterior and interior. Also on the property is a carriage barn built in about 1890.

It was listed on the National Register of Historic Places on November 15, 1988.
