= Community Building (Ticonderoga, New York) =

- U.S. National Register of Historic Places
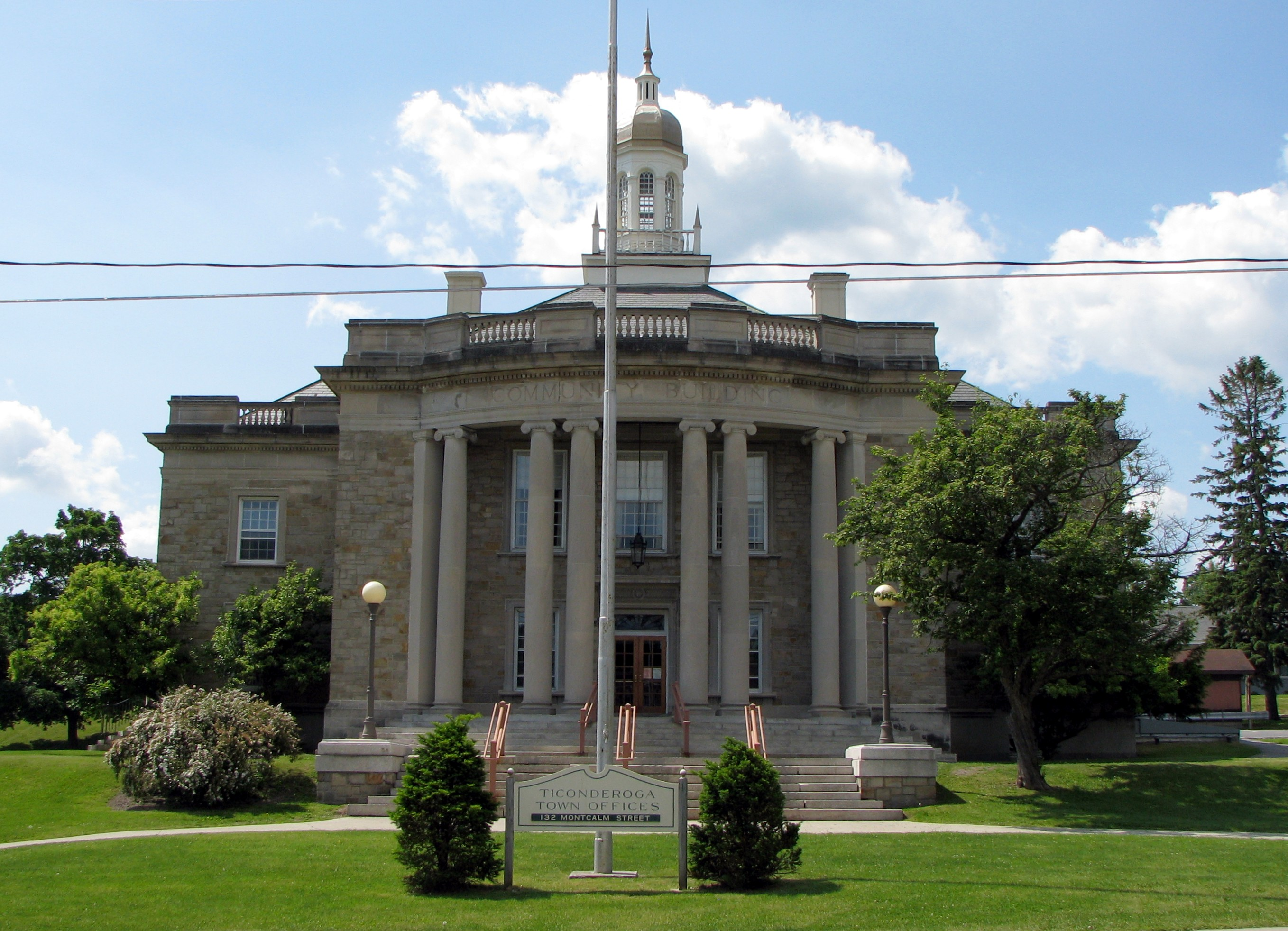
- Community Building, May 2009

- Location within New York Location within the United States
- Location: Montcalm and Champlain Sts., Ticonderoga, New York
- Coordinates: 43°50′54″N 73°26′18″W
- Area: 2.9 acres (1.2 ha)
- Built: 1927
- Built by: Minor Construction Company
- Architect: Max H. Westhoff
- Architectural style: Neo-Georgian
- MPS: Ticonderoga MRA
- NRHP reference No.: 88002198
- Added to NRHP: November 15, 1988

Community Building is a historic town hall located at Ticonderoga in Essex County, New York. It was built in 1927 and is a large two story, five bay neo-Georgian style ashlar granite building with a central bowed portico. The portico has four Ionic order columns and two engaged pilasters. It has a slate hipped roof anchored by a central octagonal cupola.

It was listed on the National Register of Historic Places in 1988.
