= McGreevey (surname) =

McGreevey is an Irish surname originating in Clare Ireland. Notable people with the surname include:

- Dina Matos McGreevey, Jim McGreevey's ex-wife
- Jim McGreevey (born 1957), 52nd Governor of New Jersey
- John McGreevey (1922−2010), American screenwriter
- Michael McGreevey (born 1948), American actor and screenwriter
- William McGreevey (born 1938), American economist

== See also ==
- MacGreevy
- McGreevy
