= George Eustis Paine =

American politician

George Eustis Paine Jr.

Member of the New York State Senate (39th District)
- In office 1961–1964
- Preceded by: Gilbert T. Seelye
- Succeeded by: Nathan Proller

Personal details
- Born: August 27, 1920 Islip, New York, U.S.
- Died: September 23, 1991 (aged 71)
- Spouse: Joan Widener Leidy (m. 1941; div. 1950)
- Relations: Augustus G. Paine Jr. (grandfather)
- Children: 2
- Parent(s): George Eustis Paine; Helen Ellis
- Education: St. Mark's School
- Alma mater: Princeton University

George Eustis Paine Jr. (August 27, 1920 – September 23, 1991) was an American politician from New York.

== Early life ==
Paine was born on August 27, 1920, in Islip, Suffolk County, New York. He was the son of George Eustis Paine Sr. (1894–1953) and Helen (née Ellis) Paine (1895–1948). After his mother's death in 1948, his father remarried to Katryna Ten Broeck Weed (1897–1962), the daughter of New York State Assemblyman George S. Weed.

The Paines lived in Willsboro, Essex County, where they owned a pulp mill which had been taken over by George Jr's grandfather Augustus G. Paine Jr. (1866–1947). George Jr attended St. Mark's School in Southboro, Massachusetts, followed by Princeton University.

== Career ==
Following his graduation from Princeton, he worked for Fidelity and Casualty Insurance Company in New York City.

Paine was a member of the New York State Senate (39th District) from 1961 to 1964, sitting in the 173rd and 174th New York State Legislatures.

== Personal life ==
In July 1941, he married Joan Widener Leidy (1923–1988), a granddaughter of Joseph E. Widener, the art collector who was a founding benefactor of the National Gallery of Art in Washington, D.C. They had two children, and divorced in 1950.

He died on September 23, 1991.

New York State Senate
Preceded by Gilbert T. Seelye	New York State Senate; 39th District; 1961–1964	Succeeded by Nathan Proller
