= McGreevy =

McGreevy is a surname. Notable people with the surname include:

- John McGreevy (born 1963), American historian
- John H. C. McGreevy (1913–2004), Canadian military officer and school director
- Michael McGreevy (born 2000), American baseball player
- Michael T. McGreevy (1865–1943), American businessman and baseball fanatic
- Molly McGreevy (1936–2015), American actress
- Sean McGreevy, Northern Ireland goalkeeper in Gaelic football
- Thomas McGreevy (1825–1897), Canadian politician

== See also ==
- MacGreevy
- McGreevey
