= Adsit =

Adsit is an American surname. Notable people with the surname include:

- Gavin Kwan Adsit, Indonesian football player
- Nancy H. Adsit, American author
- O. H. Adsit, American mayor of Juneau, Alaska (1902–1904)
- Scott Adsit (born 1965), American comedian

== See also ==
- Adsit Log Cabin, historical American log cabin
