= Flat Rock Camp =

- U.S. National Register of Historic Places
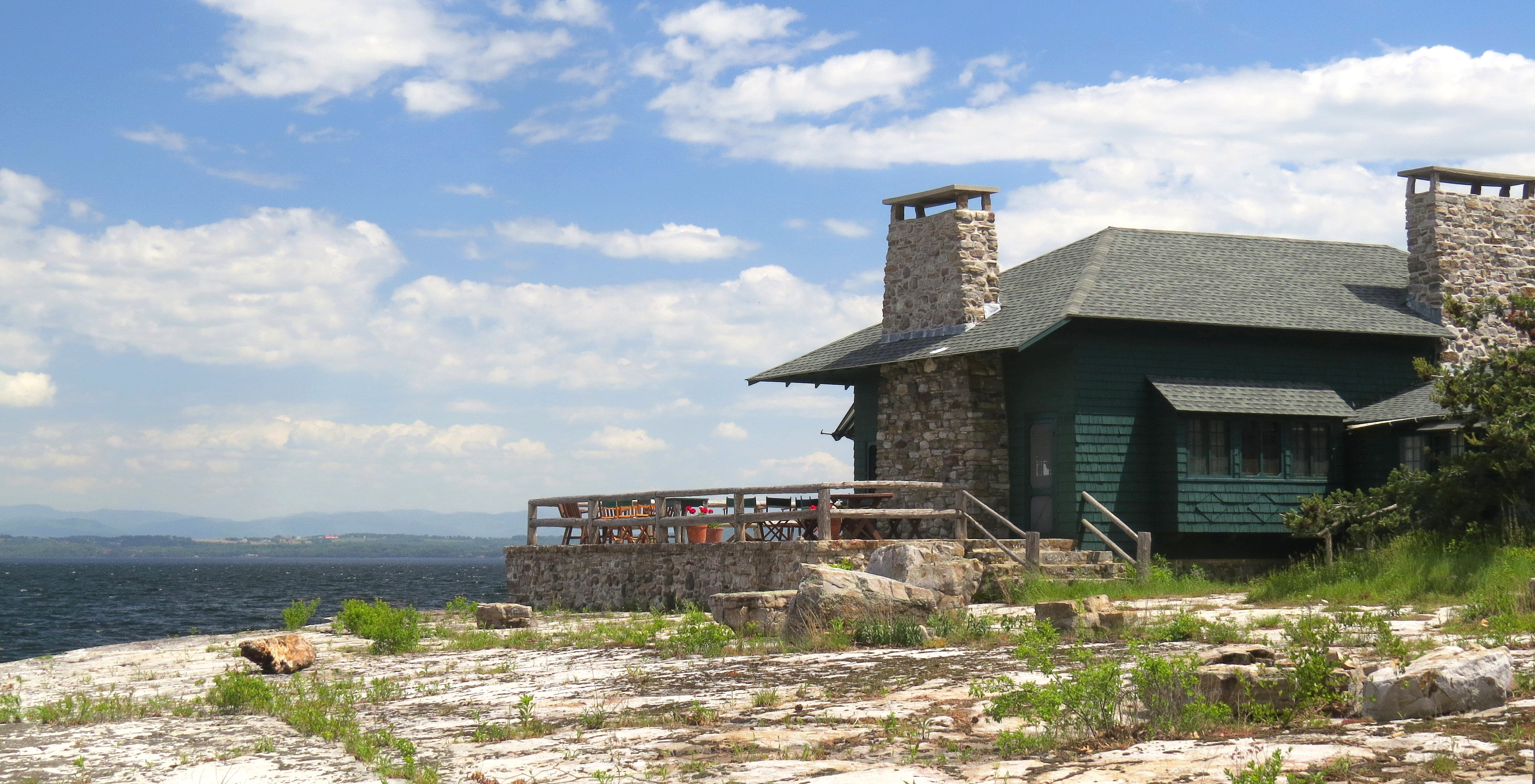
- Flat Rock Camp, looking east over Lake Champlain to the Green Mountains of Vermont

- Location within New York Location within the United States
- Location: Willsboro Point, Willsboro, New York
- Coordinates: 44.3769°N 73.3643°W
- Built by: Lyman Smith
- Architect: Augustus G. Paine, Jr.
- Architectural style: Late 19th And Early 20th Century American Movements
- NRHP reference No.: 06000642
- Added to NRHP: July 26, 2006

Flat Rock Camp is an Adirondack Great Camp in Willsboro, New York, United States. It is located on Willsboro Point on Lake Champlain.

== History ==
In 1885, Augustus G. Paine, Jr. (1866–1947) moved to Willsboro to manage a local pulp mill, and began buying land in the area, eventually amassing about 1,000 acres (400 ha), including 3 miles (5 km) of Lake Champlain shoreline.

Flat Rock Camp, which was named after the flat shelf of Potsdam sandstone the house is built on, was constructed according to Paine's designs as a summer retreat for himself and his family. Work began in 1890 and continued in stages over roughly the next 20 years. It was largely built by Lyman Smith, Paine's immediate neighbor to the north. The numerous stone chimneys were erected by Peter Lacey, a stonemason from Keeseville, New York.

As originally constructed, the camp consisted of numerous buildings, including the main house, two cabins, a chapel, an icehouse, servant's quarters, and other service outbuildings, many of which were demolished after Paine's death. The main house, which still survives, is a single story building, with seven bedrooms, a dining room and a large living room with a vaulted ceiling. In its heyday, up to thirty guests could be accommodated at the compound, along with the staff. The camp was supported by orchards, a dairy farm, and a 3-acre (1.2 ha) vegetable garden.

The compound also featured extensive gardens, planted on topsoil laid over the sandstone, which were maintained under the guidance of Paine's first wife, Maud Eustis Potts, and, after her death, his second wife Francisca Machado Warren and their daughter, Francisca Warren Paine. The gardens are listed in the Smithsonian Archives of American Gardens.

The camp and its surrounding property, which includes wetlands, farmland, orchards and forests, are still owned by the Paine family, but in 1978 they were placed under the stewardship of the Adirondack Nature Conservancy to ensure that the land will not be developed in the future.
