= Augustus G. Paine Sr. =

American financier

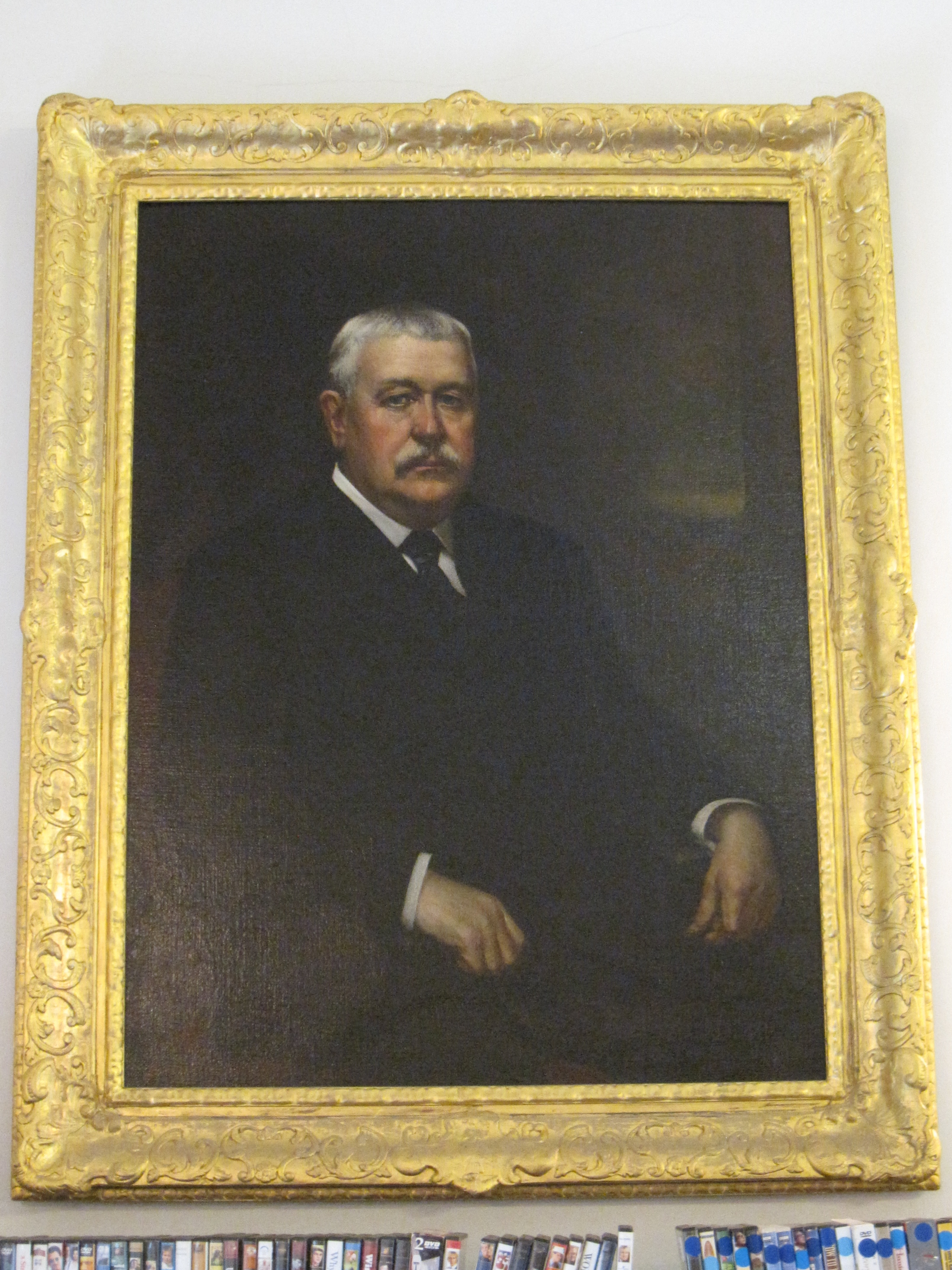
Augustus G. Paine Sr. (painting by George Burroughs Torrey, 1915/16)

Augustus Gibson Paine Sr. (15 January 1839 – 26 March 1915) was an American financier.

== Biography ==
He was born on 15 January 1839 in Brownfield, Maine and after living in Boston, Massachusetts for a time, came to Manhattan, New York City in 1862. For 22 years he was in the dry goods commission business and then embarked on various enterprises.

He became president and director of the New York and Pennsylvania Company, president and managing director of the McDonald Electrolytic Company, treasurer and a director of the Yaryan Company, a trustee of the New York Life Insurance Company, president of the Armstrong Real Estate Improvement Company, the Johnsonburg National Bank, the Hanover Land & Dock Company, and the Highland Paper Company. He was also the executor of the will of the speaker Thomas Brackett Reed, of whom he was a good friend.

Paine was a member of the Union League, the Merchants, and the New York Athletics Clubs.

He died at the age of 77 in the Plaza Hotel and was laid to rest in Woodlawn Cemetery in the Bronx.

The painter George Burroughs Torrey (1863–1942) painted large double portraits of Paine and his wife. They were located in the New York townhouse of his son on 31 East 69th Street and later donated by the family to the Paine Memorial Library in Willsboro, New York.

== Family ==
He married Charlotte M. Bedell (15 November 1840 – 15 January 1929), together they had one son, Augustus G. Paine Jr. (1866–1947). His son became an officer in most of the companies in which his father was interested.
