= David Brading =

British historian (1936–2024)

David Brading FRHistS FBA
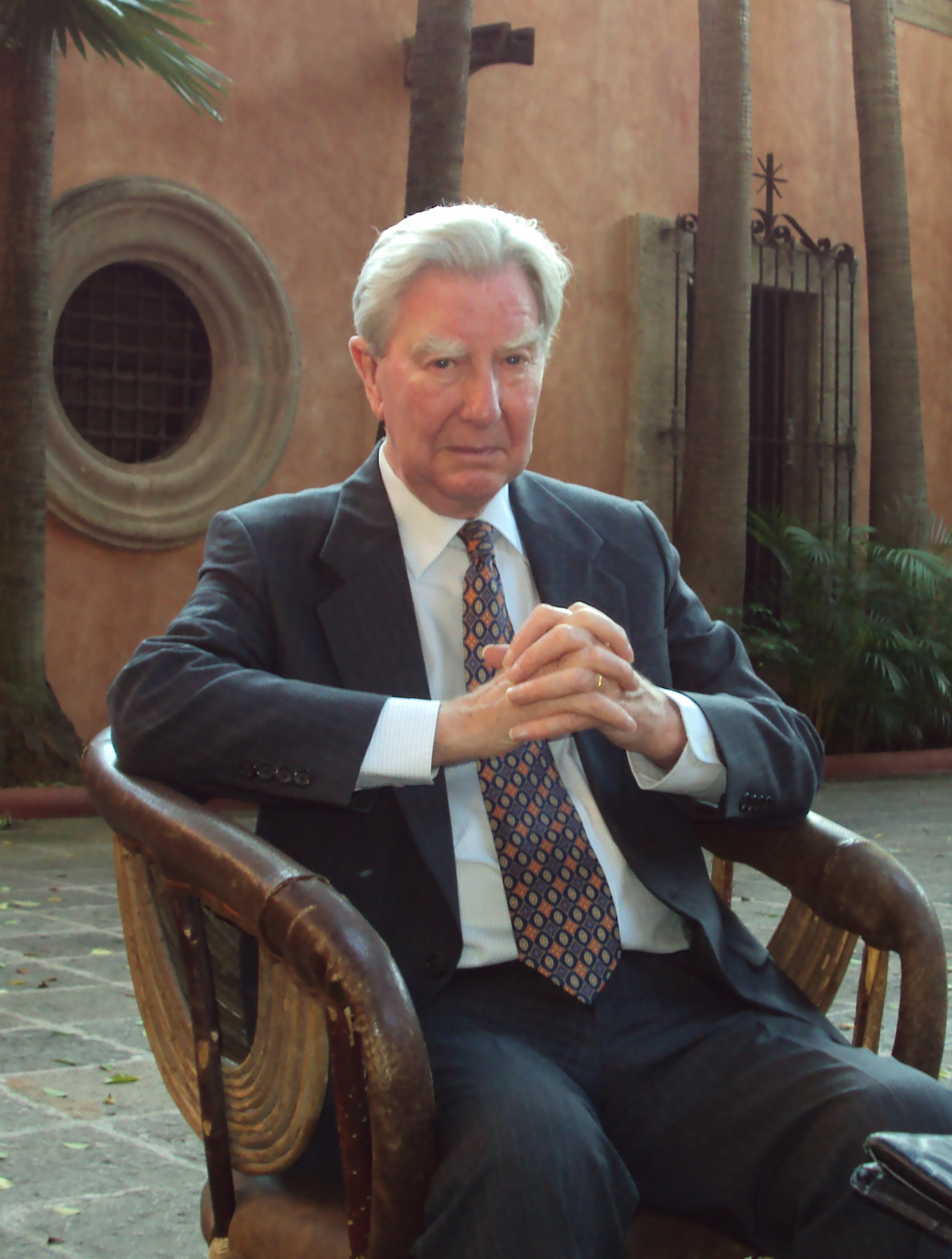
- Brading in 2009
- Born: David Anthony Brading; 26 August 1936; London, England
- Died: 20 April 2024 (aged 87); Cambridge, England
- Occupations: Historian, writer
- Spouse: Celia Wu Brading (m. 1966)
- Children: Christopher James Brading
- Awards: Bolton Prize (1972); Order of the Aztec Eagle (2002)

Academic background
- Education: Pembroke College, Cambridge (BA, MA); Yale University; University College London (PhD)
- Doctoral advisor: John Lynch
- Influences: Knowles; Elton; Postan

Academic work
- Institutions: University of Cambridge; Yale University; University of California, Berkeley
- Notable students: Fernando Cervantes; Eric Van Young
- Notable works: Miners and Merchants in Bourbon Mexico (1971); The First America (1991); Mexican Phoenix: Our Lady of Guadalupe (2001)

David Anthony Brading FRHistS, FBA (26 August 1936 – 20 April 2024) was a British historian and Professor Emeritus of Mexican History at the University of Cambridge, where was an Emeritus Fellow of Clare Hall and an Honorary Fellow of Pembroke College. His work has been recognized with multiple awards, including the Bolton Prize in 1972, the Order of the Aztec Eagle, and the Medalla 1808—both of which were awarded by the Mexican government—and the Medal of Congress from the Peruvian government in 2011.

He is regarded as one of the foremost historians of Latin America in the United Kingdom, and was the most widely cited British Latin Americanist.

== Early life and education ==
David Brading was born in London, England, and educated at St Ignatius' College and Pembroke College, Cambridge, where he read history and obtained a BA (Hons) double first-class honours in 1960. He was an Exhibitioner and Foundation Scholar at the University of Cambridge where he attended the lectures of David Knowles, Geoffrey Elton and Michael Postan. In 1961, he was awarded a Henry Fellowship to Yale University. But it was later that year, whilst in Mexico, that Brading's fascination with the country began:

I have now found my field of study: sixteenth-century Spain and Latin America...The more I think of it, the more Latin America seems attractive. Sixteenth–century Spain, looking back to the Reconquista and forward to the Counter Reformation and the decadence. The nature of its Catholicism, its mysticism, the history of its expansion, the Jesuits, its art, architecture and poetry. Latin America with its archaeology and anthropology, the nature of its liberalism and its revolutions.

After working for several months in the Civil Service as Assistant Principal at the Board of Trade, he received his MA degree from the University of Cambridge and enrolled for a PhD degree at University College London, under the supervision of John Lynch.

Deciding to investigate silver mining in New Spain, Brading spent 15 months engaged in archival research, starting in the Archive of the Indies, the Biblioteca Nacional de España and the Archivo Histórico Nacional before continuing in Mexico in the National Library of Mexico, the General Archive of the Nation and the archive of Guanajuato. The fruition of this research was the completion in 1965 of his doctoral thesis, entitled "Society and Administration in Late Eighteenth Century Guanajuato with especial reference to the Silver Mining Industry", which was examined by Charles Boxer and John Parry.

Returning to the United States as an assistant professor at the University of California, Berkeley, Brading delivered three sets of lectures dealing with Mexico, Peru and Argentina, before moving to Yale University as associate professor in 1971.

Brading's first book, Miners and Merchants in Bourbon Mexico 1765–1810, was published in 1971. It dealt with the general history of the silver industry in Mexico with a comprehensive study of Guanajuato and its mines, population and leading families. A review in the Annals of the American Academy of Political and Social Science called it a "landmark of dissertation research and organization" while Fernand Braudel, who is considered one of the greatest of the modern historians, found it a "fascinating book". It won the Bolton Prize in 1972.

In 1973, Brading returned to the University of Cambridge as a university lecturer in Latin American history, and was Director of the Centre of Latin American Studies at the University of Cambridge from 1975 to 1990. He was a fellow of St Edmund's College from 1975 to 1988. In 1991, a LittD degree was awarded to Brading and he was made reader in Latin American History at the University of Cambridge. The following year, he was the Leverhulme Research Fellow in Mexico, and received an honorary doctorate from the University of Lima in Peru, and was elected member of the European Academy of Sciences and Arts, of which he was one of only ten British members in the humanities, the others including Roger Scruton, Richard Overy, Norman Davies and Timothy Garton Ash. In 1999, Brading was made Professor in Latin American History at the University of Cambridge.

Brading died on 19 April 2024, aged 87.

== Works ==
In 1992, Brading's book The First America: The Spanish Monarchy, Creole Patriots, and the Liberal State, 1492–1867 was published. Its central thesis was that Spaniards born in the New World (creoles) had an American cultural identity, a creole consciousness, distinct from those born and raised in Spain (peninsulares). A review in the journal History declared it to be a book of major importance on the topic, as did a review in the Journal of Latin American Studies. The Mexican literary magazine Letras Libres said that "it occupies a place of honor in the library of neophytes and scholars".

In 2001, Brading published Mexican Phoenix, Our Lady of Guadalupe: Image and Tradition across Five Centuries, a detailed history of the most important religious icon in Latin America – the Virgin of Guadalupe. Foreign Affairs magazine commented in a review saying that it was "brilliant"... and had "remarkable insight".

== Festschrift ==
In 2007, Brading was honoured by a Festschrift, with essays by former students and colleagues, as a "celebration of his outstanding contribution to the field of Mexican history". The result was Mexican Soundings: Essays in Honour of David A. Brading. Its genesis lay in a September 1999 three-day conference, "Visions and Revisions in Mexican History", held at Corpus Christi College, Cambridge.

Mexican Soundings is organised into two distinct halves. The opening three essays focus on Brading's work and life, and the six following highlight the themes that have marked his career, and range from the late seventeenth to the twentieth centuries, focused on religion, political culture and Mexican national identity.

Enrique Florescano's essay pays tribute to Brading's "thorough research for mining, agricultural production, land tenure and historical textual analysis of chronicles, political treatises and myths piece encapsulates the principal contributions of each of David Brading's major works".

Eric Van Young's "historiographical essay, in particular, underlines the impact that each of Brading's publications has made... Brading is the "chief architect" of the Age of Revolution periodization (1750-1850), which he calls "Brading's century;" that he led the way in "the socialization of elite studies in Mexican historiography…and that he is the leading scholar of intellectual history and the Catholic Church for colonial Mexico".

The next two essays explore Colonial society and culture with Susan Deans-Smith's essay focusing on the work of painters and guild politics in colonial Mexico City. It is a "study finely tuned to questions of guild and community, Spanish presumptions of superiority, and the assertions of men of indigenous, mestizo, and mulatto ancestry". Ellen Gunnarsdóttir's article is centred around Francisca de Los Ángeles, a Querétaro Beata who lived in the late seventeenth century and the first half of the eighteenth. "A fascinating portrayal of how women might break out of traditional gender restraints in colonial society". A trio of essays explores the middle decades of the nineteenth century and the liberal reform era's conflicts with Brian Hamnett's portrait of Tomas Mejia, a figure who linked local and national politics and illustrated the dense network of clientelistic relationships behind the familiar categories of "liberal" and "conservative" blurring the crucial period of 1840–1855.

María Eugenia García Ugarte's recounting of the life of the Bishop of Puebla Pelagio Antonio de Labastida y Dávalos "offers a narrative of how one influential member of the Catholic establishment sought to navigate a way through the more draconian measures of liberal reform designed to restrict Church privileges".

Guy Thomson's "Memoirs and Memories of the European Intervention in the Sierra de Puebla, 1868–1991" offers an illuminating examination of the interactions among nineteenth-century historical narratives, modern historical memories, and scholarly historians.

Alan Knight's discussion is on whether there is such a thing as "Mexican national identity…as it" is shifting and disputatious in nature, is a conceptual black hole, and that while the 1910 Revolution and its aftermath advanced some fundamentals of a common national identity in Mexico, "the objective national identity remained notoriously fragmented by region, locality, religion, ideology, age, gender, and ethnicity". Knight argues for an integrated economic, social, political, and cultural history, "as exemplified in the work of David Brading".

Brading's autobiographical essay, "A Recusant Abroad", was an amplification of a piece published in Spanish in 1993. It was received enthusiastically by reviewers; Keith Brewster, in the Bulletin of Latin American Research, commented: "We are afforded a rare glimpse of an eminent scholar's development from a hesitant graduate searching a true vocation into an accomplished master of his craft." Cynthia Radding, in the Journal of Latin American Studies, called it "beautifully reflective". Timothy Anna, in The Americas, found Brading's essay to be fascinating: "Declaring that his first love was Baroque art and architecture and Catholic political thought and mysticism, Brading provides his assessment of the origins, meanings, and purposes of his various publications." Professor John Tutino, of Georgetown University, commented in The Hispanic American Historical Review that "Brading's contributions to Mexican history are equalled by few and exceeded by none… No one can understand the silver economy, social processes, and government reforms of the late colonial era without knowing Miners and Merchants, the book that introduced David Brading to a generation. The First America took on even larger challenges, brilliantly tracing imperial power and ideology along with Spanish American cultural and intellectual responses and innovations over more than three centuries, reaching past independence to mid-nineteenth-century liberal reforms."

== Awards and honours ==
Brading received honorary degrees from four universities, including Universidad del Pacifico, Universidad de Guanajuato, Universidad de Lima, and the Universidad Michoacana de San Nicolás de Hidalgo.

== Books in English ==
- Miners and Merchants in Bourbon Mexico, 1763–1810 (Cambridge University Press, 1971) ISBN 9780521078740
- Haciendas and Ranchos in the Mexican Bajio: Leon 1700–1863 (Cambridge University Press, 1978) ISBN 9780521222006
- Prophecy and Myth in Mexican History (Cambridge University Press, 1984) ISBN 9789681672294
- The Origins of Mexican Nationalism (Cambridge University Press, 1985) ISBN 0904927474
- The First America: The Spanish Monarchy, Creole Patriotism and the Liberal State 1492–1867 (Cambridge University Press, 1991) ISBN 9780521391306
- Church and State in Bourbon Mexico. The Diocese of Michoacan, 1749–1810 (Cambridge University Press, 1994) ISBN 9780521523011
- Mexican Phoenix. Our Lady of Guadalupe: Image and Tradition Across Five Centuries (Cambridge University Press, 2001) ISBN 9780521801317

== Books in Spanish ==
- Espiritualidad barroca, política eclesiástica y renovación filosófica : Juan Benito Díaz de Gamarra, 1745–1783 (Mexico, D.F. : Centro de Estudios de Historia de Mexico Codumex 1993) OCLC 31727050
- Una iglesia asediada : el Obispado de Michoacán, 1749–1910 (Fondo de Cultura Económica, México, D.F., 1994) ISBN 9789681642624
- Siete Sermones Guadalupanos, 1709–1765 (México : Centro de Estudios de Historia de México, Condumex, 1994) ISBN 9789686815047
- El Ocaso Novohispano:Testimonios Documentales (Mexico, D.F.:Instituto Nacional de Antropologia e Historia, 1996) ISBN 9789682952326
- Apogeo y derrumbe del imperio español (México, D.F. Clío 1996) ISBN 9789686932416
- Juan Pablo Viscardo y Guzmán (1748–1798):el hombre y su tiempo (Lima:Fondo Editorial del Congreso del Perú, 1999) ISBN 9789972755156
- Cinco miradas británicas a la historia de México (México, D.F. : Consejo Nacional para la Cultura y las Artes, 2000) ISBN 9701847423
- Octavio Paz y la poética de la historia Mexicana (Fondo de Cultura Económica, 2002) ISBN 9789681666729
- Nueve sermones guadalupanos (1661–1758) (Centro de Estudios de Historia de México Condumex, México, 2005) ISBN 9789686815276
- El Pegaso o el mundo barroco novohispano en el siglo XVII (Renacimiento, Sevilla 2006) ISBN 9788484722816
- Visión y símbolos : del virreinato criollo a la República Peruana (Lima Banco de Crédito 2006) ISBN 9789972837159
- La Canonización de [Juan Diego] (México : Fondo de Cultura Económica : Centro de Investigación y Docencia Económicas, 2009) ISBN 9786071600981
- El Gran Michoacán en 1791 : sociedad e ingreso eclesiástico en una diócesis novohispana (Zamora, Michoacán : Colegio de Michoacán; San Luis Potosí, S.L.P. : El Colegio de San Luis, 2009) ISBN 9786077764144
- Profecía y patria en la historia del Perú (Lima : Fondo Editorial del Congreso del Perú, 2011) ISBN 9786124075247
- Ensayos sobre el México contemporáneo (Ciudad de México : FCE - Fondo de Cultura Económica, 2021) ISBN 9786071670489

== Books edited and prefaces ==
- Caudillo and Peasant in the Mexican Revolution (Cambridge University Press, 1980) ISBN 9780521102094
- Historia de la revolución de Nueva España (Prefacio. In Saint-Lu, A., & Bénassy-Berling, M. (Eds.) Centro de estudios mexicanos y centroamericanos. 1990 ISBN 9782859441852
- Génesis del porvenir : sociedad y política en Querétaro (1913–1940) (Instituto de Investigaciones Sociales/UNAM : Gobierno del Estado de Querétaro : Fondo de Cultura Económica, México, 1997) ISBN 9789681649104
- Letter to the Spanish Americans : a facsimile of the second English edition (Providence, Rhode Island : John Carter Brown Library, 2002) ISBN 9780916617585
- Carta dirigida a los españoles americanos (Fondo de Cultura Económica, México, D.F., 2004) ISBN 9789681674106
- Los proyectos y las realidades : América Latina en el siglo XX (Ediciones Universitarias de Valparaíso, Pontificia Universidad Católica de Valparaíso, Valparaíso, Chile, 2004) ISBN 9789561703605
- Mexican soundings : Essays in honour of David A. Brading Edited by Susan Deans-Smith and Eric Van Young (London: Institute for the Study of the Americas, 2007) ISBN 9781900039734
- El mestizaje mexicano (BBVA Fundación Bancomer, México, 2010) OCLC 946165518
- América (Fundación para las Letras Mexicanas : Instituto Tecnológico de Estudios Superiores de Monterrey; Fondo de Cultura Económica, Monterrey, N.L., México, D.F., 2015) ISBN 9786071626189

== Articles and book chapters ==
- "Society and Administration in Late Eighteenth Century Guanajuato: With Especial Reference to the Silver Mining Industry". PhD diss., University of London 1965.
- "La minería de la plata en el siglo XVIII: el caso Bolaños". Historia Mexicana 18, no. 3 (1969): 317–333.
- "Nuevo plan para la mejor administracion de justicia en América: Vicente de Herrera" Boletin, vol. IX (Archivo General de la Nacién, Mexico 1969), pp. 369–400.
- "Relacién sobre la economia de Querétaro y de su corregidor don Miguel Dominguez, 1810–1811, Boletin, vol. XI (AGN, Mexico)

(1969) pp. 275–318.

- "Mexican Silver-Mining in the Eighteenth Century: The Revival of Zacatecas". The Hispanic American Historical Review 50, no. 4 (1970): 665–81.
- "La situación económica de los hermanos don Manuel y don Miguel Hidalgo y Costilla, 1807". Boletín del Archivo General de la

Nación 2, no. 11.1-2 (1970): 15–82.

- with Harry E. Cross. "Colonial silver mining: Mexico and Peru". Hispanic American Historical Review 52, no. 4 (1972):545–579.
- and Margarita Zaionz de Zilberay. "Las minas de plata en el Perú y México colonial. Un estudio comparativo". Desarrollo

económico (1971):101–111.

- "Grupos étnicos; clases y estructura ocupacional en Guanajuato (1792)". Historia Mexicana 21, no. 3 (1972): 460–480.
- "The Structure of Agricultural Production in the Mexican Bajío during the Eighteenth Century". 1972.
- with H. E. Cross. "Silver mines in colonial America". Hispanic Am. Hist. Rev 52 (1972): 547–549.
- "Noticias sobre la economía de Querétaro y de su corregidor don Miguel Domínguez, 1802–1811".
- with Celia Wu. "Population Growth and Crisis: Leon, 1720–1860". Journal of Latin American Studies 5, no. 1 (1973): 1–36.
- "Creole Nationalism and Mexican Liberalism". Journal of Interamerican Studies and World Affairs 15, no. 2 (1973): 139–90.
- "Las tareas primarias en la historia econémica Latinoamericana} in Enrique Flores- cano (ed.), La historia econmica en América Latina, 2vols. (Septentas, Mexico), vol. II, (1973) pp. 100-10.
- "Grupos étnicos, clases y estructura occupacional en Guanajuato (1792)"; Historia Mexicana, vol. XXI, (1972) pp. 460–80.
- "Los Españoles En México Hacia 1792". Historia Mexicana 23, no. 1 (1973): 126–44.
- "Government and Elite in Late Colonial Mexico". The Hispanic American Historical Review 53, no. 3 (1973): 389–414.
- "La Estructura de La Producción Agrícola En El Bajío de 1700 a 1850". Historia Mexicana 23, no. 2 (1973): 197–237.
- "Gobierno y Élite En El México Colonial Durante El Siglo XVIII". Historia Mexicana 23, no. 4 (1974): 611–45.
- "The Capital Structure of Mexican Haciendas 1700 -1850" Ibero-Amerikanisches Archiv 1, no. 2 (1975): 151–82.
- Katz, Friedrich, and Doris M. Ladd. "Correspondence". The Hispanic American Historical Review 55, no. 1 (1975): 174–76.
- "Mineros y comerciantes en el México borbónico, 1763-1810" Fondo de Cultura Económica, Mexico (1975).
- "The Historical Demography of Eighteenth Century Mexico: A Review" Bulletin of the Society for Latin American Studies, no. 25 (1976): 3–17.
- "Tridentine Catholicism and Enlightened Despotism in Bourbon Mexico". Journal of Latin American Studies 15, no. 1(1983):1–22.
- "Prophet and Apostle: Bartolomé de Las Casas and the Spiritual Conquest of America". New Blackfriars 65, no. 774(1984):513–34.
- "Facts and Figments in Bourbon Mexico". Bulletin of Latin American Research 4, no. 1 (1985): 61–64.
- "The Incas and the Renaissance: The Royal Commentaries of Inca Garcilaso de La Vega". Journal of Latin American Studies 18,

no. 1 (1986):1–23.

- "Manuel Gamio and Official Indigenismo in Mexico". Bulletin of Latin American Research 7, no. 1 (1988): 75–89.
- "The Two Cities: St. Augustine and the Spanish Conquest of America". Revista Portuguesa de Filosofia 44, no. 1 (1988): 99–126.
- "Liberal Patriotism and the Mexican Reforma". Journal of Latin American Studies 20, no. 1 (1988): 27–48.
- with María Urquidi "Manuel Gamio y El Indigenismo Oficial En México". Revista Mexicana de Sociología 51, no. 2 (1989):267–84.
- "Comments on 'The Economic Cycle in Bourbon Central Mexico: A Critique of the Recaudacion Del Diezmo Liquido En Pesos,' by

Ouweneel and Bijleveld. I". The Hispanic American Historical Review 69, no. 3 (1989): 531–38.

- "Power and Justice in Catorce 1799–1805". Ibero-Amerikanisches Archiv 20, no. 3/4 (1994): 357–80.
- "Nationalism and State-Building in Latin American History". Ibero-Amerikanisches Archiv 20, no. 1/2 (1994): 83–108.
- with Lucrecia Orensanz. "Francisco Bulnes y La Verdad Acerca de México En El Siglo XIX". Historia Mexicana 45, no. 3 (1996).
- with Lucrecia Orensanz. "Edmundo O'Gorman y David Hume". Historia Mexicana 46, no. 4 (1997): 695–704.
- with Rafael Vargas. "La Patria Criolla y La Compañía de Jesús". Artes de México, no. 58 (2001): 58–71.
- "Europe and a world expanded", The Short Oxford History of Europe. The Sixteenth Century (Oxford University Press, 2006) 174–99.
- "Divine Idea and Our Mother". Elite Understanding in the Cult of Our Lady of Guadalupe in Mexico' Studies in Church History no.42 (Boydell Press, Suffolk, 2006), 240–60.
- "Our Lady of Guadalupe of Mexico. Religion and Patriotism", Vírgenes, Reinas y Santas.(Universidad de Huevla, 2006) 163–91.
- "Prólogo', André Pons, Blanco White y América" (Universidad de Oviedo, 2006), 13–23.
- "Patria e Historia: tríptico peruano', Visión y Símbolos del virreinato criollo a la república peruana" ed. Ramón Mujica Pinilla (Lima, Banco del Credito, 2006), 1–41.
- "Juárez, conductor de hombres", Letras Libres, VII, 87 (Mexico, 2006), 50–4.
- with María Palomar "La Plata Zacatecas en el Siglo XVIII" Artes de México, no. 86 (2007): 20–31.
- "El Jansenismo español". Artes de México, no. 92 (2008): 66–71.
- "Imperial Mexico: the Viceregal City, Mexico City through History and Culture", ed. Linda A. Newson and John P. King (London, The British Academy, Oxford University Press, 2009), pp. 39–53.
- "The rebirth of ancient Mexico, Moctezuma. Aztec Ruler", ed. Colin Mcewan and Leonardo López Luján (London, British Museum Press, 2009), pp. 256–73.
- "Social Darwinism and Nationalism in Mexico', Nations and their Histories: Constructions and Representations, ed. Susana Carvalho and François Gemenne (London, Palgrave Macmillan, 2009), pp.111–35.
- "Orígen de la grandeza de Guanajuato, Renovada grandeza de Guanajuato" (Mexico, Artes de México, 2009), pp. 29–85.
- "Pasado y presente en México del siglo XIX", El temple Liberal. Acercamiento a la obra de Enrique Krauze, compilación de Fernando García Ramírez (Mexico, Fondo de Cultura Económica and Tusquets Editores, 2009), pp. 51–75.
- "Ensayo. Justo Sierra y la Historia Patria", 20/10. Memoria de las Revoluciones en México, no.6 (Mexico, 2009), pp. 14–49.

== Academic achievements, awards and honours ==
In the Spring 1998 newsletter of the Conference on Latin American History published by the University of North Carolina at Charlotte, William McGreevey, in a study of the 11 volumes of The Cambridge History of Latin America bibliographic essays, demonstrated that David Brading was "cited more frequently than that of any other writer on Latin American history".

- Henry Fellow, Yale University, 1960–1961
- Herbert Eugene Bolton Prize, 1972
- Visiting Fellow, University of Tokyo, Japan, 1985
- Directeur d'Etudes at I'Ecole de Hautes Etudes en Science Sociales, 1989
- Professor Honorario (Honoris Causa), University of Lima, Peru, 1993
- Fellow of Academia Scientiarum et Artium Europaea, 1993
- Leverhulme Research Fellow in Mexico,1993
- Visiting Scholar, Centro de Estudios de Historia de Mexico, Condumex,1993
- Member of European Academy of Sciences and Arts
- Fellow of Clare Hall, Cambridge, 1995
- Fellow of the British Academy 1995
- Julio Cortázar Visiting Professor, University of Guadalajara, 1996
- Miembro Honorario, Instituto Riva-Agüero, Escuela de Altos Estudios, Pontificia Universidad Catolica del Peru, 1997
- Miembro Fundador, La Sociedad Mexicana de Bibliofilos, A.C. 1997
- Miembro Correspondiente, La Academia Nacional de la Historia, Lima, Perú, 1998
- Andrew W. Mellon Senior Research Fellow, John Carter Brown Library, Brown University, 2000
- Academico Corresponsal, Academia Mexicana de la Historia, 2008
- Honorary Fellow of Pembroke College, Cambridge, 2008
