= Earl Hindman =

American actor (1942–2003)

- Born: Earl John Hindman; October 20, 1942; Bisbee, Arizona, U.S.
- Died: December 29, 2003 (aged 61); Stamford, Connecticut, U.S.
- Occupation: Actor
- Years active: 1968–2003
- Television: Home Improvement
- Spouse: Molly McGreevy (m. 1976)

Earl John Hindman (/ˈhaɪndmən/; October 20, 1942 – December 29, 2003) was an American actor, best known for his roles as Bob Reid on the television soap opera Ryan's Hope from 1975—1984 and 1988–89, and as Wilson W. Wilson on the sitcom Home Improvement from 1991–1999.

== Early years ==
Hindman was born in Bisbee, Arizona, the son of Eulena and Burl Latney Hindman, who worked in the oil pipeline business. He studied acting at the University of Arizona.

== Career ==
Hindman's earliest roles were in low-budget exploitation films in the 1960s, though he moved on to appear in productions from major Hollywood film studios in the 1970s, playing villains in two 1974 thrillers, The Taking of Pelham One Two Three and The Parallax View. He also appeared in the films Who Killed Mary What's 'Er Name? (1971), Greased Lightning (1977), The Brink's Job (1978), Taps (1981), and Murder in Coweta County (1983). Hindman also played the part of J.T. in the Lawrence Kasdan film Silverado (1985), and the part of Satch in the Leonard Nimoy film Three Men and a Baby (1987).

One of Hindman's well-known early roles was as Bob Reid on the soap opera Ryan's Hope. He played the role from 1975–1984 and later returned for its final episodes in 1988–89. Hindman's wife (Molly McGreevy) was also on the soap from 1977–81 as Polly Longworth, best friend to media tycoon Rae Woodard.

In one of his most famous roles, Hindman played the role of the kindly neighbor Wilson W. Wilson on the television sitcom Home Improvement from 1991–1999. Wilson was only ever partially seen, because of a running gag that only the top of his face was visible as he talked to his neighbor from the other side of a tall fence. In later episodes, Wilson is occasionally seen in other environments outside of his backyard, but something – a mask for a costume, an on-set prop, a large bundle Wilson is carrying – always blocks part of his face to the home viewer.

His final roles included the movie Final (2001), and appearances in Law & Order and Law & Order: Criminal Intent.

== Personal life and death ==
On May 21, 1976, Hindman married Molly McGreevy, with whom he later acted in Ryan's Hope. McGreevy later became an Episcopal priest.

Hindman died of lung cancer on December 29, 2003, at the age of 61, in Stamford, Connecticut.

== Filmography ==
=== Film ===
Year	Title	Role	Notes
1967	Teenage Mother		
1968	The Kiss of Her Flesh	Don	Credited as "Leo Heinz"
1969	The Ultimate Degenerate	Bruno	Credited as "Leo Heinz"
1971	Who Killed Mary What's 'Er Name?	Whitey	
1974	The Parallax View	Deputy Red	
1974	Shoot It Black, Shoot It Blue	Garrity	
1974	The Taking of Pelham One Two Three	George Steever aka Mr. Brown	
1977	Greased Lightning	Beau Welles	
1978	The Brink's Job	FBI agent #3	
1981	Taps	Lieutenant Hanson	
1985	Silverado	J.T.	
1987	Three Men and a Baby	Satch	
1988	Talk Radio	Chet / Black John / Jerry	Voice
1991	The Ballad of the Sad Café	Henry Macy	
1991	Fires Within	Sergeant	
2001	Final	Official	

=== Television ===
Year	Title	Role	Notes
1974	The Doctors	Det. Roy Griffin	27 episodes
1975–1984, 1988–1989	Ryan's Hope	Bob Reid	TV series
1983	Murder in Coweta County	J.H. Potts	TV movie
1985	Spenser: For Hire	Sgt. Clayton	Episode: "Resurrection"
1986	The Equalizer	Findlay	Episode: "Breakpoint"
1986–1987	The Equalizer	Lieutenant Elmer	3 episodes "Prelude" (S2.E1) "The Cup" (S2.E10) "Coal Black Soul" (S2.E19)
1987	Spenser: For Hire	Max Ordella	Episode: "Mary Hamilton"
1989	War and Remembrance	Lt. Commander Wade McClusky	TV miniseries
1990	Rising Son	Victor	TV movie
1991–1999	Home Improvement	Wilson W. Wilson Jr.	203 episodes
2000	Law & Order	Mr. Riley	Episode: "Black, White and Blue"
2002	Law & Order: Criminal Intent	Sheriff	Episode: "The Third Horseman"
