= Ligonier Point Historic District =

Historic district in New York, United States

- U.S. National Register of Historic Places
- U.S. Historic district
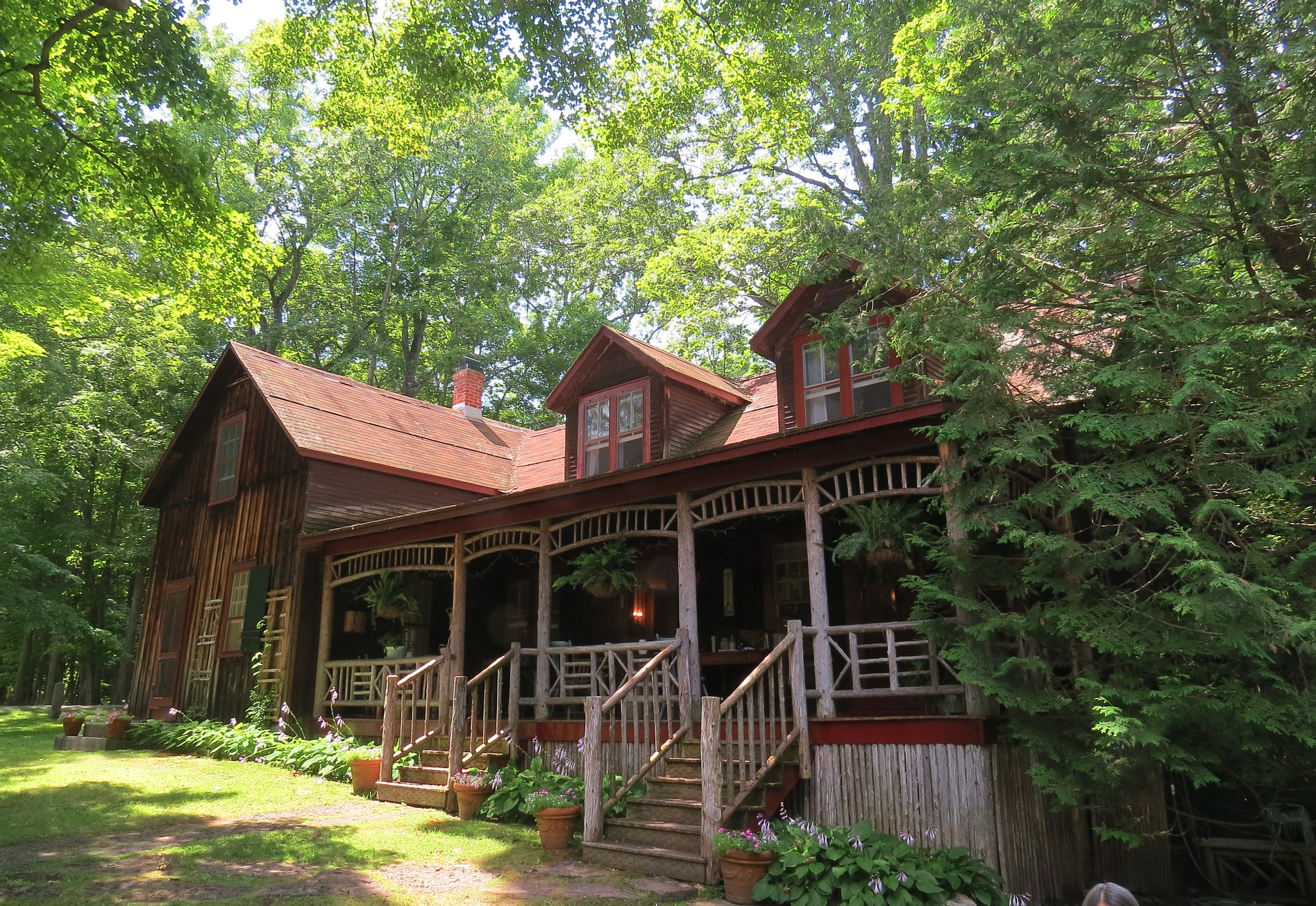
- Scragwood, Ligonier Point

- Location within New York Location within the United States
- Interactive map of Ligonier Point Historic District
- Location: Point Rd., Ligonier Way, Willsboro, New York
- Coordinates: 44°24′56″N 73°22′31″W
- Area: 79.31 acres (32.10 ha)
- Built: c. 1830-c. 1910
- Built by: Gibbs, Warren
- Architectural style: Greek Revival, Gothic Revival, Rustic
- NRHP reference No.: 12001129
- Added to NRHP: January 2, 2013

Ligonier Point Historic District is a national historic district located at Willsboro, Essex County, New York. The district encompasses 8 contributing buildings, 16 contributing sites, 7 contributing structures, and 3 contributing objects related to stone quarrying, boat building, and farming by the Clark family during the 19th century. They include the Clark Quarry and Farm, Scragwood, and Old Elm or the Corrin Clark Farm Complex. The Clark Quarry is represented by the remains of the Quarry Village; the principal, second, and third quarries (c. 1823-c. 1894); boatyard (c. 1860); Yacht Narragansett (c. 1880); and a boarding house (c. 1860). Scragwood, or the S.W. Clark Complex, includes a rustic dwelling built in stages between the 1830s and 1870s. Associated with Scragwood are the Cedar Lodge (c. 1860), Perennial Garden (c. 1910), smokehouse (c. 1850), summer house (c. 1870), and tankhouse (c. 1907). Old Elm was built in 1841, and is a two-story, five-bay, limestone dwelling with a 1 1/2-story frame wing. Also on the Corrin Clark Farm Complex are the blacksmith shop (c. 1854), smokehouse (c. 1842), icehouse (c. 1842), privy (c. 1842), and fruit orchard (c. 1860). Chazy limestone quarried from the Clark Quarry was used in the construction of the Brooklyn Bridge and New York State Capitol.

It was added to the National Register of Historic Places in 2012.
