= Edgewater Farm =

Historic house in New York, United States

- U.S. National Register of Historic Places
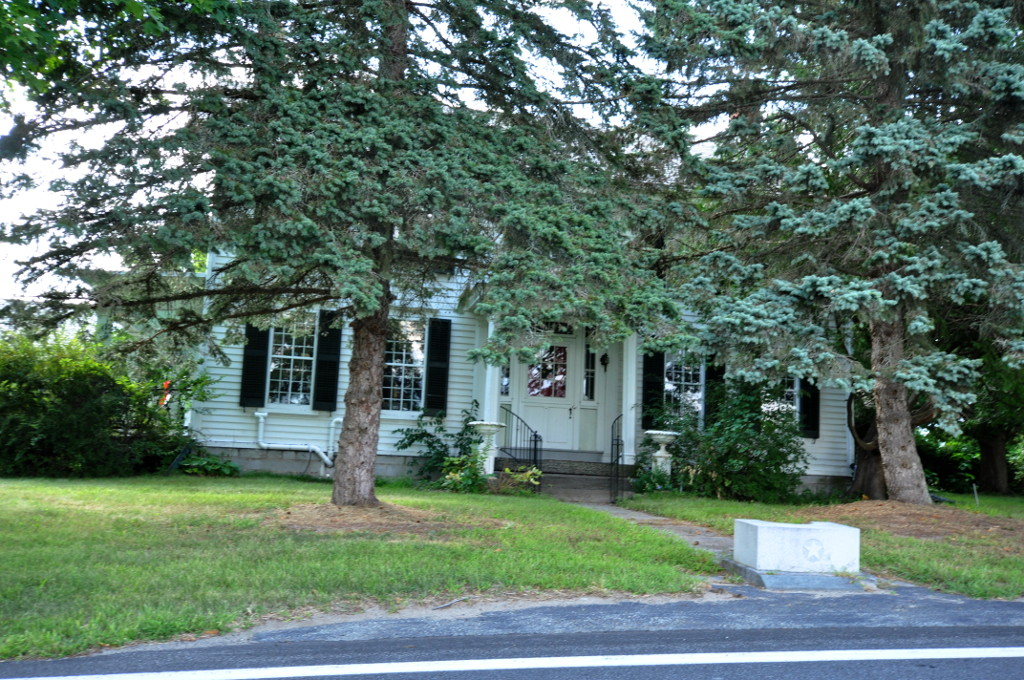

- Location within New York Location within the United States
- Location: Willsboro Point, New York
- Coordinates: 44°24′5″N 73°23′4″W
- Area: 19.8 acres (8.0 ha)
- Built: 1796
- Architectural style: Greek Revival
- NRHP reference No.: 88000035
- Added to NRHP: February 17, 1988

Edgewater Farm is a historic farm property located at Willsboro Point in Essex County, New York. It contains four contributing buildings, one contributing site, and one contributing structure. The main house, known as the Rowley house, is an early-19th-century residence, dated to about 1812 (and raided by the British during the War of 1812), with two earlier service wings from about 1796 and 1820. It consists of a rectangular, two-story, five-bay frame main block, with a two-stage ell consisting of a 1 1/2-story kitchen wing and 1 1/2-story shop / carriage barn. The main block features an elaborate Greek Revival–style entrance and portico. Also on the property are former farm outbuildings including a horse barn, a cow and hay barn, and a creamery. The property also includes a family cemetery.

It was listed on the National Register of Historic Places in 1988.
