= Willsboro Congregational Church =

Historic church in New York, United States

- U.S. National Register of Historic Places
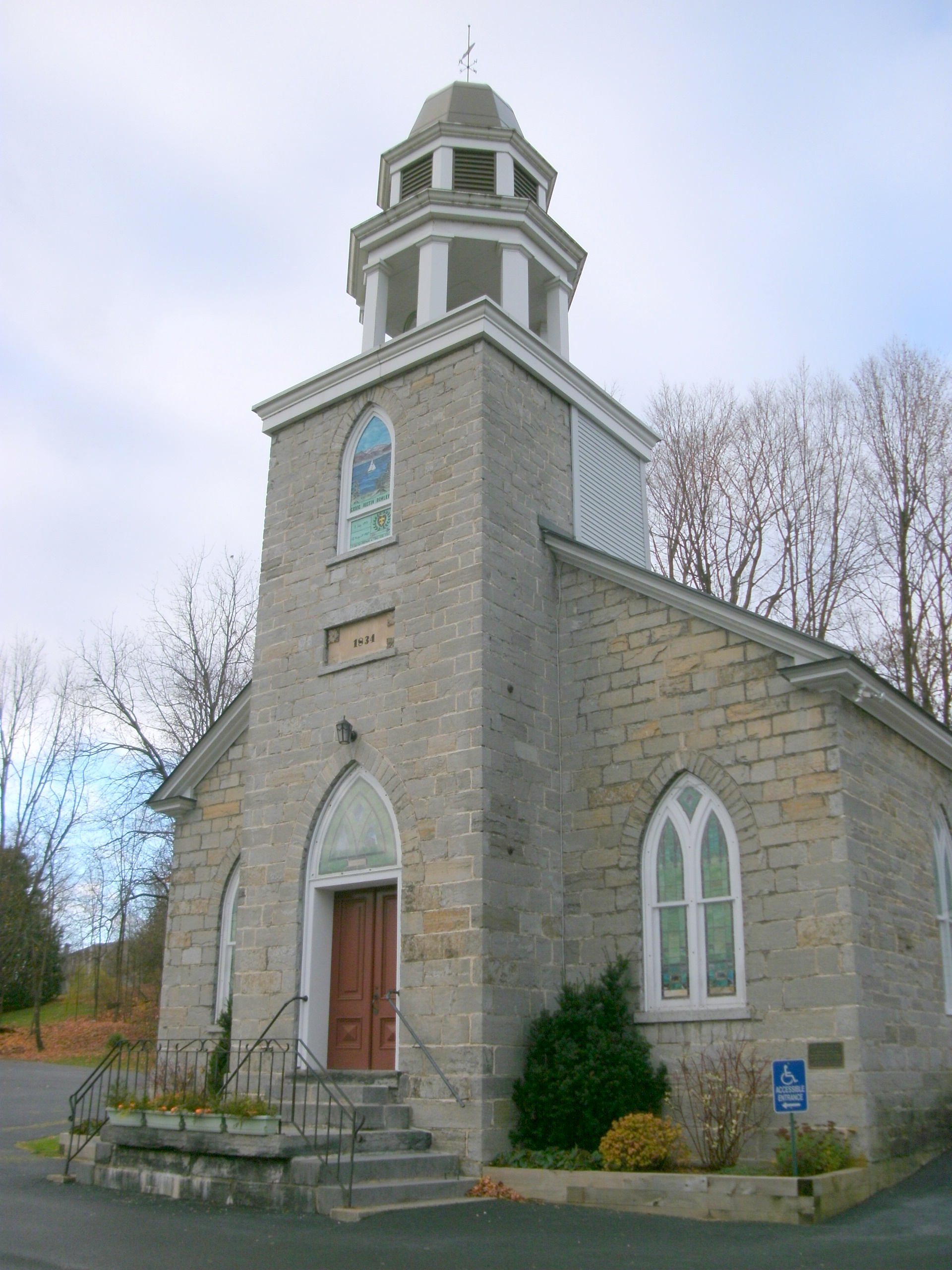
- Willsboro Congregational Church, November 2010

- Location within New York Location within the United States
- Location: NY 22, Willsboro, New York
- Coordinates: 44°21′49″N 73°23′35″W
- Area: 1.1 acres (0.45 ha)
- Built: 1834
- Architectural style: Mid 19th Century Revival
- NRHP reference No.: 84002391
- Added to NRHP: May 31, 1984

Willsboro Congregational Church is a historic Congregational church on NY 22 in Willsboro, Essex County, New York. It was built in 1834 and is a simple rectangular limestone building with a gable roof. It features an engaged bell tower at the east gable end.

It was listed on the National Register of Historic Places in 1984.
