= The Cambridge History of Latin America =

12 volume history text

The Cambridge History of Latin America is a history of Latin America, edited by Leslie Bethell and published in 12 volumes between 1985–2008.

Contributors include David Brading, J.H. Elliott, John Hemming, Friedrich Katz, Herbert S. Klein, Miguel León-Portilla, James Lockhart, Murdo J. MacLeod, Jean Meyer, John Murra, David Rock, John Womack, among others.

== Volumes ==
- Volume I: Colonial Latin America (1985)
- Volume II: Colonial Latin America (1985)
- Volume III: From Independence to c. 1870 (1985)
- Volume IV: c. 1870 to 1930 (1986)
- Volume V: c. 1870 to 1930 (1986)
- Volume VI: Latin America Since 1930: Part 1: Economy and Society (1995)
- Volume VI: Latin America Since 1930: Part 2: Politics and Society (1995)
- Volume VII: Latin America Since 1930: Mexico, Central America and the Caribbean (1990)
- Volume VIII: Latin America Since 1930: Spanish South America (1991)
- Volume IX: Brazil Since 1930 (2008)
- Volume X: Latin America Since 1930: Ideas, Culture and Society (1995)
- Volume XI: Bibliographical Essays (1995)

== See also ==
- The Cambridge Economic History of Latin America
