= Nathan Proller =

American businessman and politician

Member of the New York State Senate
- In office January 1, 1965 – December 31, 1966
- Preceded by: George Eustis Paine
- Succeeded by: Ronald B. Stafford (redistricting)
- Constituency: 39th district (1965); 47th district (1966)

Personal details
- Born: August 20, 1901 Gloversville, New York, U.S.
- Died: May 23, 1994 (aged 92)
- Party: Republican

Nathan Proller (August 20, 1901 – May 23, 1994) was an American businessman and politician from New York.

== Life ==
He was born on August 20, 1901, in Gloversville, Fulton County, New York, the son of Hyman H. Proller (died 1948) and Rebecca Proller (1876–1972). He attended Corinth High School and the Wharton School of the University of Pennsylvania. He engaged in the real estate and insurance business in Glens Falls, and entered politics as a Republican. He was Supervisor of the Town of Lake Luzerne for several terms; and was chairman of the Board of Supervisors of Warren County from 1937 to 1939.

Proller was a member of the New York State Senate in 1965 and 1966. In June 1966, after re-apportionment, he ran in the 42nd District for re-nomination, but was defeated in the Republican primary by Ronald B. Stafford, the incumbent senator from the 48th District.

He died on May 23, 1994.

== Sources ==
New York State Senate
Preceded by George Eustis Paine	New York State Senate; 39th District; 1965	Succeeded by Anthony B. Gioffre
Preceded by Warren M. Anderson	New York State Senate; 47th District; 1966	Succeeded by Warren M. Anderson
