= Westport (CDP), New York =

Westport, New York
- Census-designated place
- Location within New York
- Coordinates: 44°11′2″N 73°26′8″W
- Country: United States
- State: New York
- County: Essex
- Town: Westport

Area
  - Total: 3.64 sq mi (9.42 km^{2})
  - Land: 2.36 sq mi (6.12 km^{2})
  - Water: 1.27 sq mi (3.30 km^{2})
- Elevation: 148 ft (45 m)

Population (2020)
  - Total: 496
  - Density: 209.9/sq mi (81.03/km^{2})
- Time zone: UTC-5 (Eastern (EST))
  - Summer (DST): UTC-4 (EDT)
- ZIP code: 12993
- FIPS code: 36-80764

Westport is a hamlet and census-designated place (CDP) in the town of Westport in Essex County, New York, United States. The population of the CDP was 518 at the 2010 census, or 39.4% of the total population of the town of Westport.

== Geography ==
Westport hamlet is located in the center of the town of Westport, at the outflow of Hoisington Brook into North West Bay of Lake Champlain. The CDP extends north along the shore of the lake as far as Cove Lane and south to Maple Way. The western edge of the CDP is formed by the Delaware and Hudson Railway line and by Hammond Brook.

New York State Routes 9N and 22 intersect in the center of the hamlet. Route 9N leads west 4 miles (6 km) to Interstate 87 and 8 miles (13 km) to Elizabethtown, while NY 22 leads north 15 miles (24 km) to Willsboro. NY 9N and 22 together lead south 10 miles (16 km) to Port Henry and 26 miles (42 km) to Ticonderoga. Plattsburgh is 42 miles (68 km) north via NY 9N and I-87.

According to the United States Census Bureau, the Westport CDP has a total area of 2.36 square miles (6.11 km^{2}), all land.

== Demographics ==
Historical population
| Census | Pop. | Note | %± |
|---|---|---|---|
| 2020 | 496 | | — |
U.S. Decennial Census
