= George Burroughs Torrey =

American painter

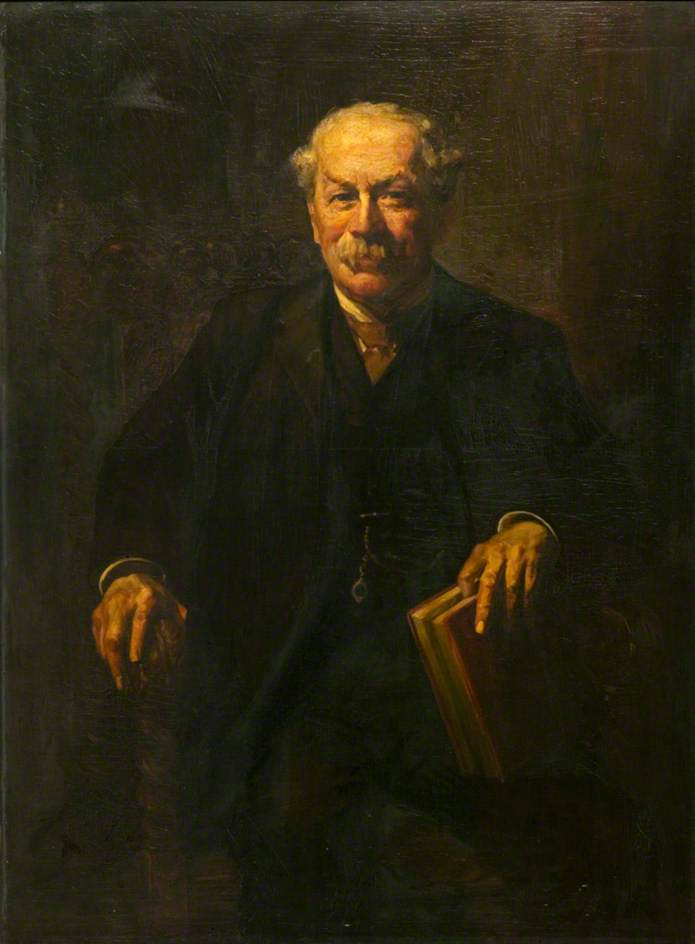
- Born: 1863; New York City
- Died: 1942 (aged 78–79)
- Known for: painting, drawing
- Notable work: Portraits of American presidents
- Patrons: American presidents, Greek royalty, society of New York

George Burroughs Torrey (1863–1942) was an American painter, best known for his portraits. He has been called the "painter of presidents", because he painted portraits of Theodore Roosevelt, William H. Taft, and Herbert Hoover.

== Biography ==
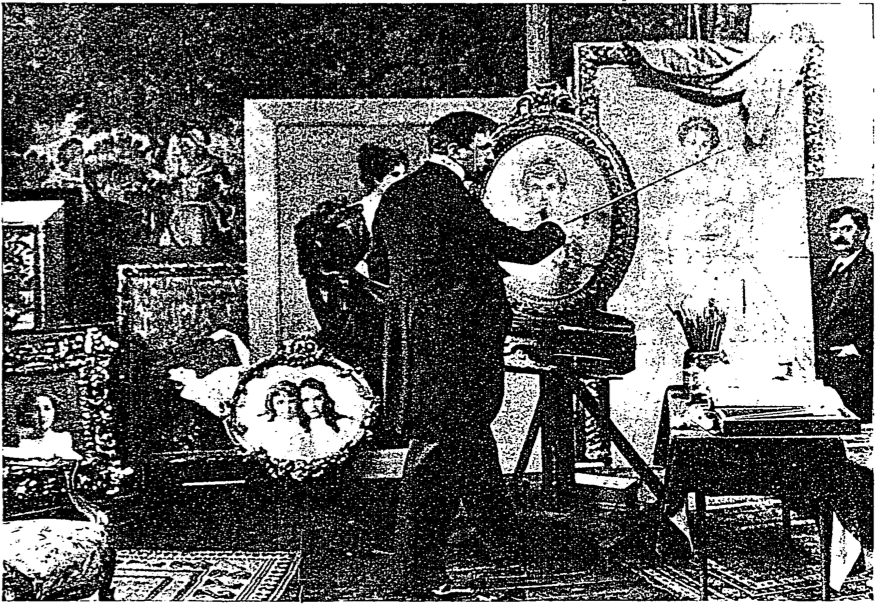
George Burroughs Torrey in his studio (before 1900)

He was born in the old Astor House in New York City. His parents were Joseph and Harriet Louise Burroughs.

He had his first studio at 543 Fifth Avenue, where he drew and painted portraits. He moved to Paris, and had a studio there by 1893, just two doors from the Hungarian painter Mihály Munkácsy, on the Boulevard Malesherbes, and began his studies with Léon Bonnat, Jean-Joseph Benjamin-Constant and Alfred Philippe Roll. Roll used to come into his studio twice a week to criticise his work. In 1895, he exhibited his first salon portrait. He was particularly impressed with and influenced by the work of the portrait painter Carolus-Duran and the mural painter Pierre Puvis de Chavannes

Torrey returned to New York in the spring of 1897, still retaining his Paris studio, where he spent six months of each year until 1906, He gave an exhibition at the Waldorf-Astoria and in the fall of 1897, he started leasing a studio at 543 Fifth Avenue.

In the summer of 1902, he painted his first portrait of King George I of Greece at Aix-les-Bains, which now hangs in the palace at Athens. Two years later, he painted another portrait of George I of Greece, who presented it to his sister, Queen Alexandra of England. This portrait hung in the queen's private apartments at Buckingham Palace. When the second portrait was completed, the King gave a dinner in honor of Torrey at Aix-les-Bains and awarded him the Order of the Savior, and at the same time expressed his wish that Torrey go to Athens and paint a portrait of Queen Olga.

The portrait of President Theodore Roosevelt was painted for Secretary of the Navy Paul Morton, who wished to present it to the city of Chicago, his former home. Secretary Morton had his own portrait painted by Torrey for the Navy Department.

For a long time, Torrey lived at 27 East 35th Street. His house featured a "Pompeian Hall" that was decorated with vines and a Louis Quinze room. He hosted lavish dinners and vaudeville entertainment for guests such as the opera singers Geraldine Farrar, Antonio Scotti and Enrico Caruso.

== Memberships ==
He was a member of the Union League, Home, and Studio Clubs.

== Family ==
Torrey married Almirita Howes in Bridgeport, Connecticut, on November 10, 1891. She divorced him in 1912/13. He later married Lillie Hart Gay Torrey, a Hawaii artist. He spent much time in Hawaii, and painted numerous portraits of business people and politicians.

He was related to Capt. Isaac Burroughs, who helped finance the Bridgeport Public Library. Several of Torrey's paintings were donated by his widow to the public library, including as a large painting of Capt. Bill Lewis at the wheel of a boat sailing on Long Island Sound.

== Assessment ==
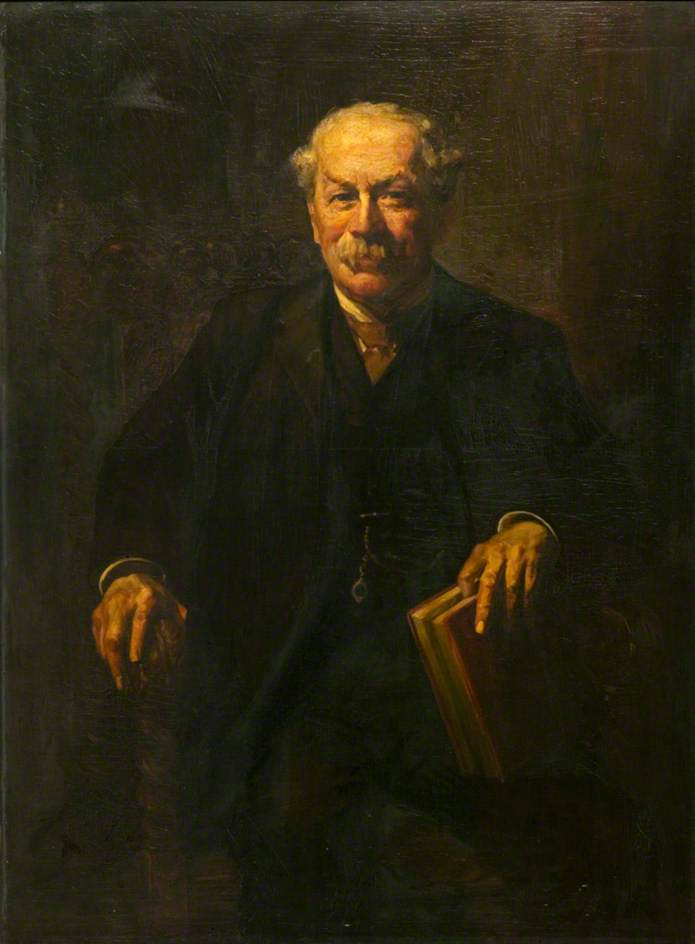
Portrait Sir Caspar Purdon Clarke, oil on canvas, 1907, Victoria and Albert Museum

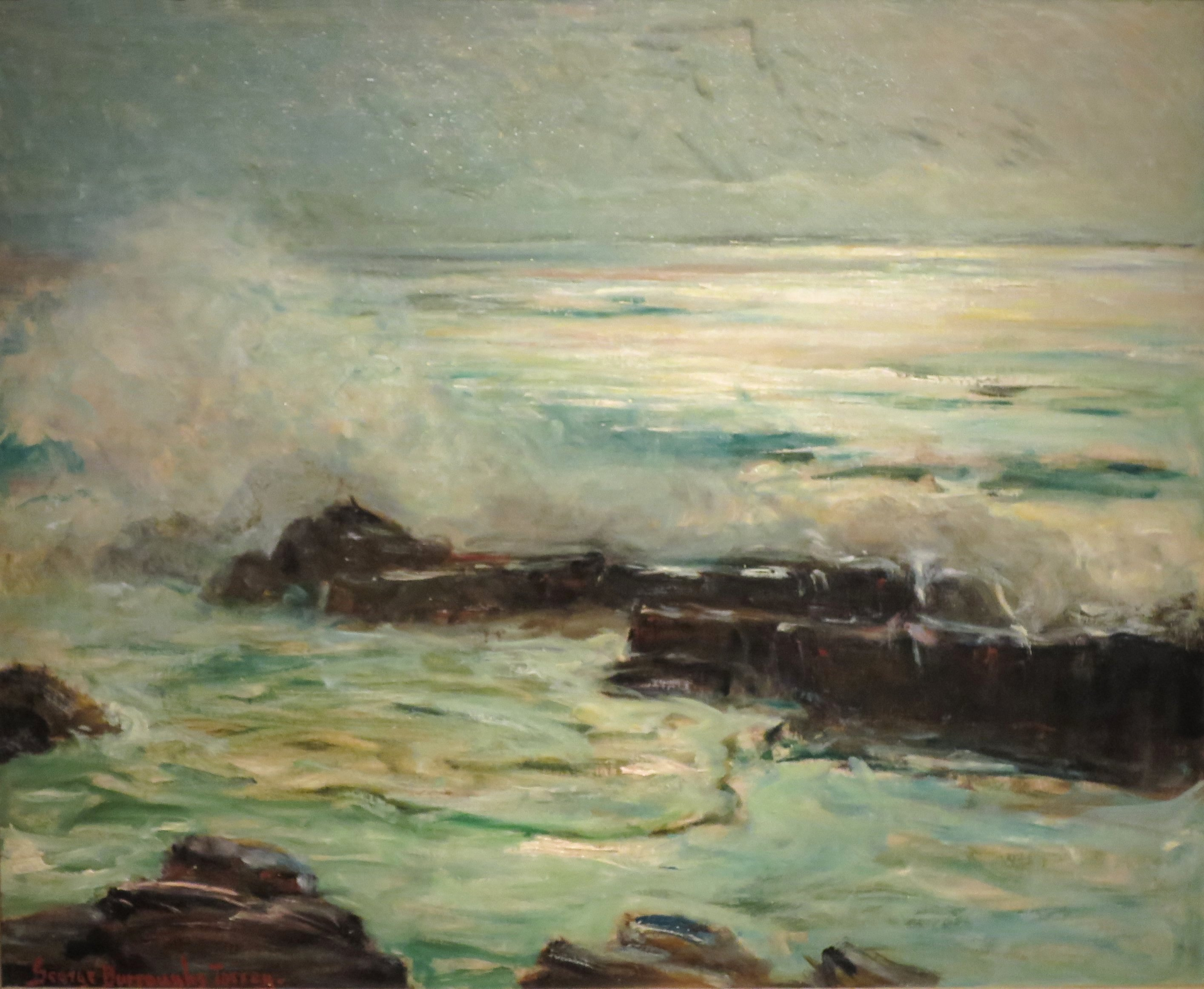
Seascape, oil on canvas, c. 1935, Honolulu Museum of Art

Torrey in his days was a popular painter and drawer of the Gilded Age, even if his style went out of fashion over time. Torrey extensively studied the early English portraitists, whose influence is manifest in his glowing colour, and in the decorative disposition of his draperies.

At the turn of the 19th century, he was acclaimed as a "fair draughtsman" with a "delicate, pretty color scheme", with his chief merit lying in refinement. He has had many sitters, and his portraits of ladies have a refined quality. His portraits are good in likeness, with graceful poses, details and textures of gowns and clothes in color.

It is also argued however, that his seascapes should be counted as his best work.

The Harvard Art Museums, the Honolulu Museum of Art, the National Museum of American History (Washington, DC), U.S. Navy Museum (Washington, DC), the Victoria and Albert Museum, the Wadsworth Atheneum (Hartford, CT), and the Yale University Art Gallery are among the public collections holding work by George Burroughs Torrey.

== Selected works ==
- Portrait of Mrs. Benjamin Franklin Dillingham
- Portrait of Mrs. John P. Laflin
- Portrait of Gen. Nelson A. Miles
- Portrait of Sir Caspar Purdon Clarke (1907) Victoria and Albert Museum
- Portrait of Mrs. Henri Wertheim and Mrs. Frederick Lewissohn (Daughters of Henry Seligman)
- Several portraits of Mrs. Torrey
- Self-portrait
- Portrait of WM. Schau
- Portrait of Mrs. Timothy M. Woodruff
- Portrait of Madame Simpson
- Portrait of Mrs. Brooks of Buffalo
- Portrait of Judge Truax
- Portrait of Jefferson Monroe Levy
- Portrait of President Herbert Hoover
- Portrait of Prince Henry of Prussia
- Double portraits of Augustus G. Paine, Sr. and his wife Charlotte M. Bedell (1915/16) Paine Memorial Library
