= Adsit Log Cabin =

Historic house in New York, United States

- Adsit Log House
- U.S. National Register of Historic Places
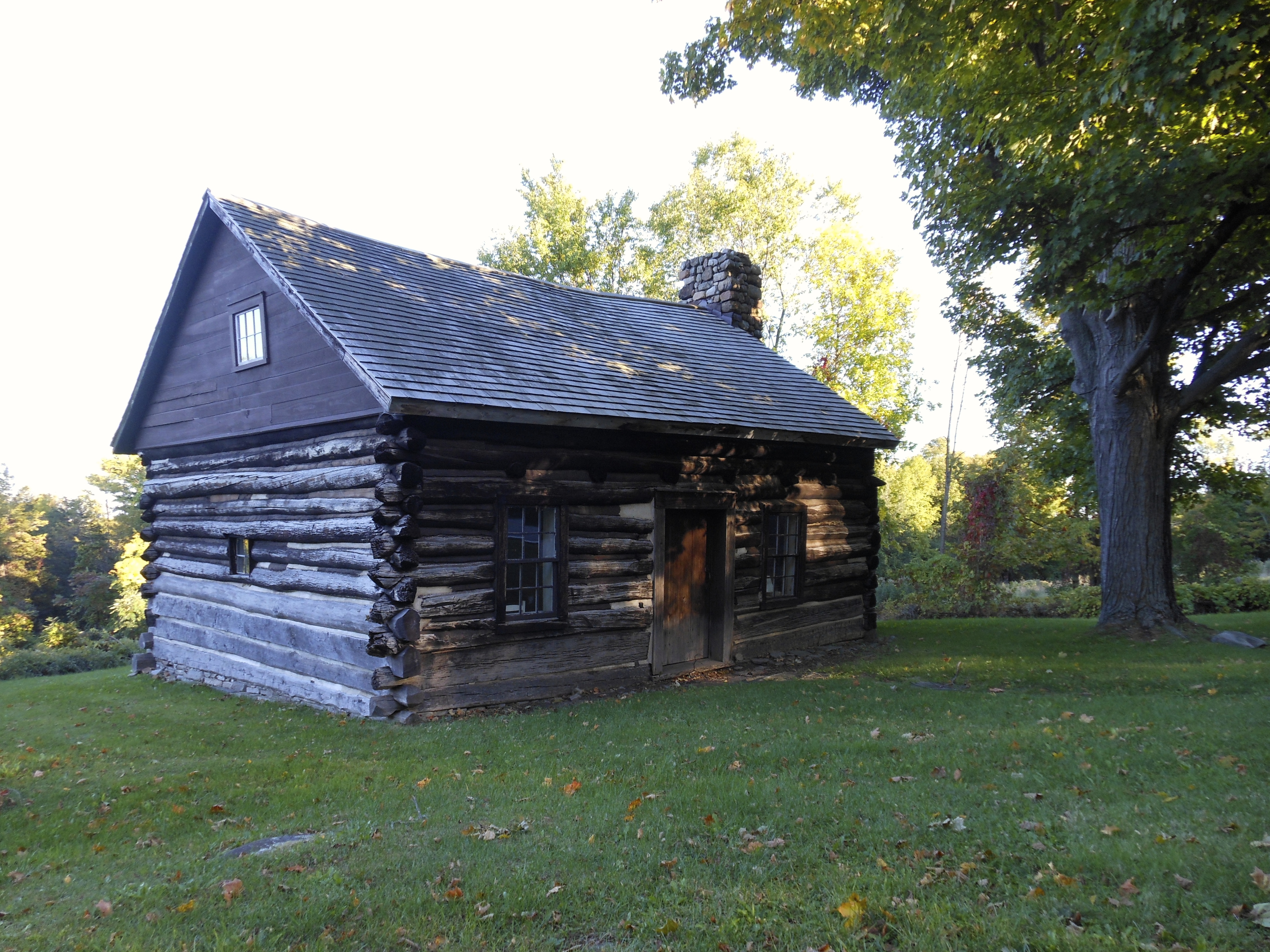
- House in 2012

- Location within New York Location within the United States
- Location: Willsboro, New York
- Coordinates: 44.4214°N 73.3750°W
- Built: 1778
- NRHP reference No.: 92001053
- Added to NRHP: August 18, 1992

The Adsit Log Cabin in Willsboro, New York, has long been said to have been built by Samuel Adsit in 1778 and is believed to be one of the oldest log cabins in the United States that still exists in its original location. Adsit was an American Revolutionary War veteran who built the cabin for his family of 16 when he moved to Willsboro Point at some time following the war; the town historian's records suggest that this was soon after 1790. The house was listed on the National Register of Historic Places in August 1992.

It is believed that the house survived due to its eventual containment within a larger structure, which was later torn down. In the 1980s, the town of Willsboro undertook a $70,000 restoration project that brought the cabin to its current condition. The furnishings have been dedicated by descendants of the Adsit family.
