= The Willsboro School =

Historic school building at Willsboro, Essex County, New York, United States

- U.S. National Register of Historic Places
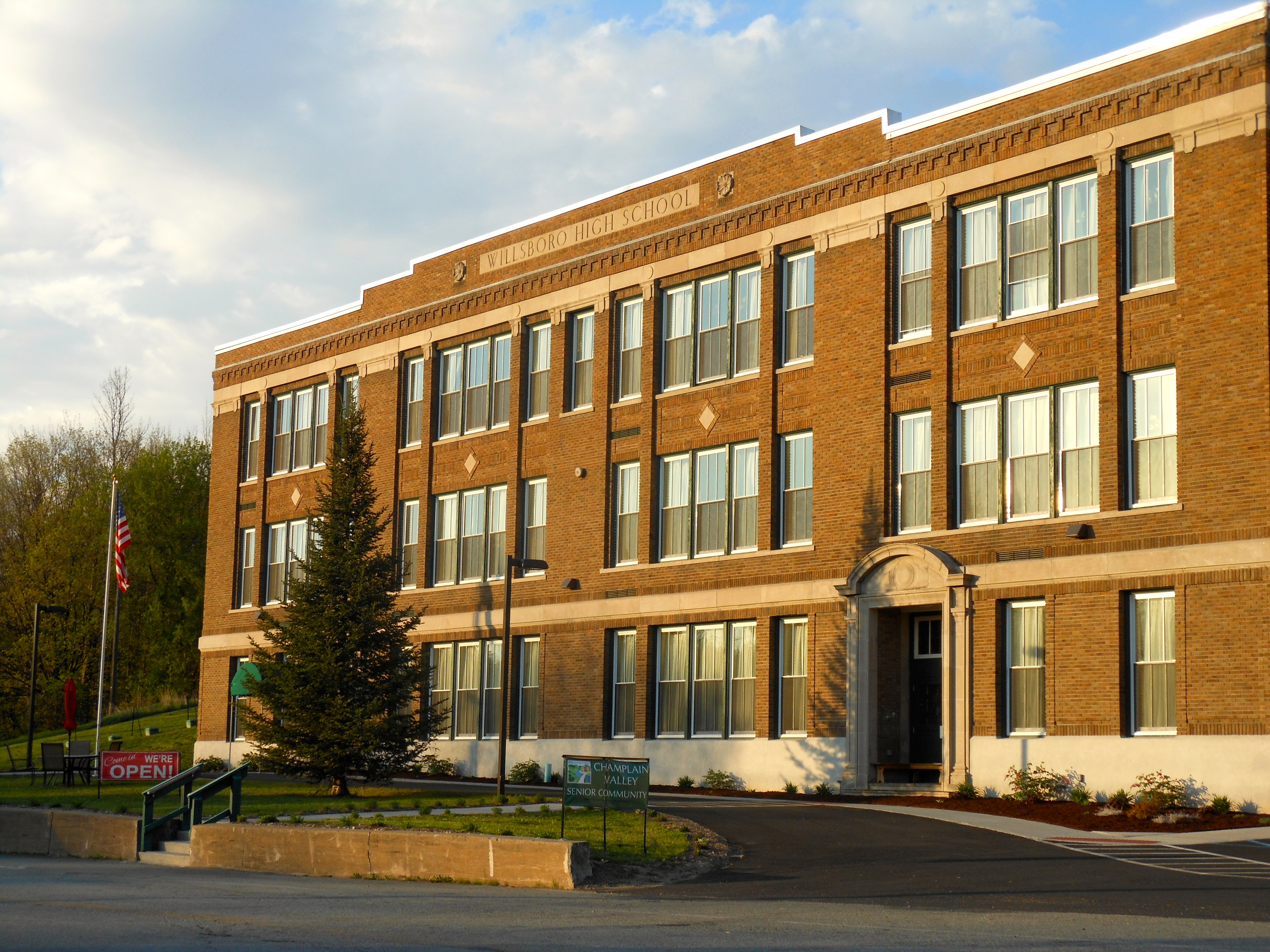

- Location within New York Location within the United States
- Location: 10 Gilliland Lane (formerly 29 School St.), Willsboro, New York
- Coordinates: 44°21′53.13″N 73°23′24.16″W
- Area: 1.79 acres (0.72 ha)
- Built: 1927
- Architectural style: Neoclassical
- NRHP reference No.: 10000135
- Added to NRHP: March 31, 2010

The Willsboro School is a historic school building located at Willsboro in Essex County, New York. It was built in 1927 and is a three-story red brick building designed in the Neoclassical style in accordance with New York State's standardized school design guidelines of the early 20th century. The 1927 buildings is 130 feet (40 m) wide and 60 feet (18 m) deep and has approximately 24,000 square feet (2,200 m^{2}) of space. An addition was completed in 1952. It is 90 feet (27 m) by 56 feet (17 m) and contains approximately 15,000 square feet (1,400 m^{2}) of space. It closed in 2001.

The former Willsboro School was rescued from the threat of demolition by developer Eli Schwartzberg who established its listing on the National Register of Historic Places in 2010 to ensure the building's preservation. Schwartzberg then renovated and converted the building into the Champlain Valley Senior Community which opened in 2013.
