= Abraham Aiken House =

Historic house in New York, United States

- U.S. National Register of Historic Places
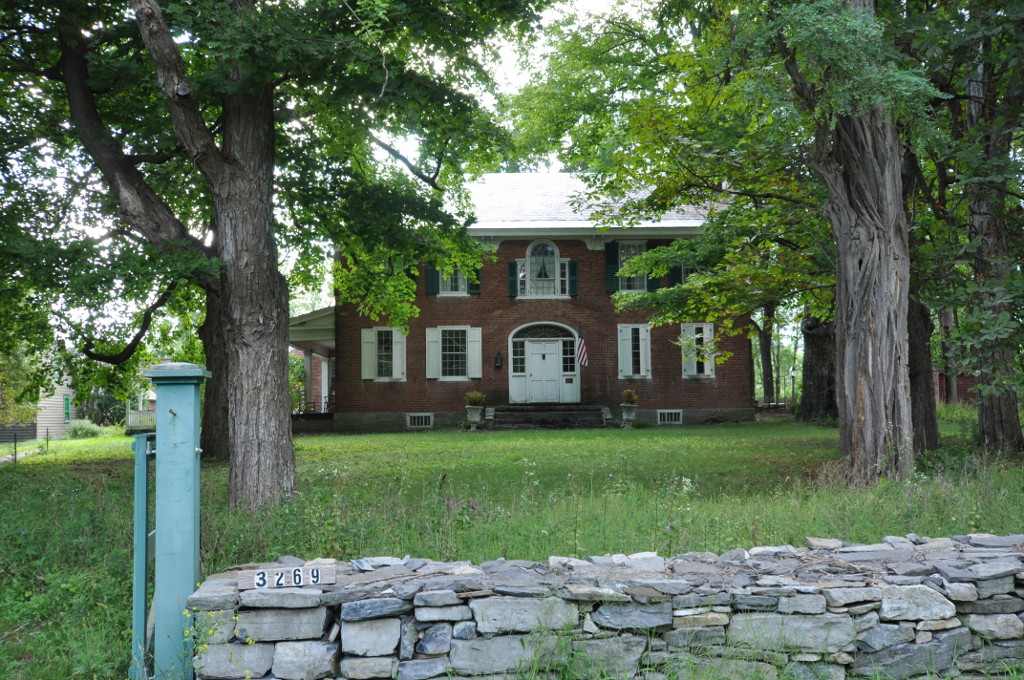

- Location within New York Location within the United States
- Location: NY 22/Lakeshore Rd., Willsboro, New York
- Coordinates: 44°20′36″N 73°21′46″W
- Area: 4 acres (1.6 ha)
- Architect: Aiken, Abraham
- Architectural style: Georgian
- NRHP reference No.: 89000465
- Added to NRHP: June 8, 1989

The Abraham Aiken House is a historic house and estate located at Willsboro in Essex County, New York.

== Description and history ==
The home was built about 1807 and is in the Georgian style. It is a 2 1/2-story, rectangular, gable-roofed structure built of brick. It features a central Palladian window at the second level. Also on the property are a horse barn (c. 1807), tenants' cottage (c. 1840), and five stone lined wells.

It was listed on the National Register of Historic Places on June 8, 1989.
