= Augustus G. Paine Jr. =

American paper manufacturer and bank official

- Born: Augustus Gibson Paine Jr. October 19, 1866; New York City, U.S.
- Died: October 23, 1947 (aged 81); New York City, U.S.
- Spouses: Maud Eustis Potts (m. 1888; died 1919) Francisca Machado Warren (m. 1923)
- Children: 6
- Parent(s): Augustus G. Paine Sr. Charlotte M. Bedell Paine
- Relatives: George Eustis Paine (grandson); Molly McGreevy (granddaughter)

Augustus Gibson Paine Jr. (October 19, 1866 – October 23, 1947) was an American paper manufacturer and bank official.

== Early life ==
Paine was born in New York City on October 19, 1866. He was a son of Augustus G. Paine Sr. (1839–1915) and Charlotte M. (née Bedell) Paine (1840–1929). He was educated privately in the United States and Europe.

== Career ==
In 1885, Paine moved to Willsboro, New York, to manage a local pulp mill. He became president of the New York and Pennsylvania Company of Lock Haven, Pennsylvania, which was founded in 1890. The firm was later based at 230 Park Avenue operated a Clarion paper mill and related industries in Johnsonburg, Pennsylvania, and in 1920 built the Castanea Paper Company in Lock Haven. The New York and Pennsylvania Company became one of the leading paper manufacturers in the country and a major supplier to the Curtis Publishing Company, the publisher of the Ladies' Home Journal, The Saturday Evening Post and others.

In 1945, Curtis Publishing Company acquired a 30% interest in the New York and Pennsylvania Company. After his death in 1947, Curtis became the sole owner of the New York and Pennsylvania Co. around 1950.

=== Ornithology ===
Paine was an avid hobby ornithologist. At the age of 19 or 20, together with Lewis B. Woodruff, he composed a list of birds of Central Park, counting over 100 species. This was regarded as the first official list of birds of Central Park, and was published in Forest and Stream on June 10, 1886. An article in The New Yorker on August 26, 1974, calls attention to this early list.

His collection of some 1,200 specimens were later donated by his family to the American Museum of Natural History under the name "Augustus Paine and Alvah Jordan collection of birds". A copy of the original catalogue and documents relating to the gift were also given by the family to the museum archive.

== Personal life ==
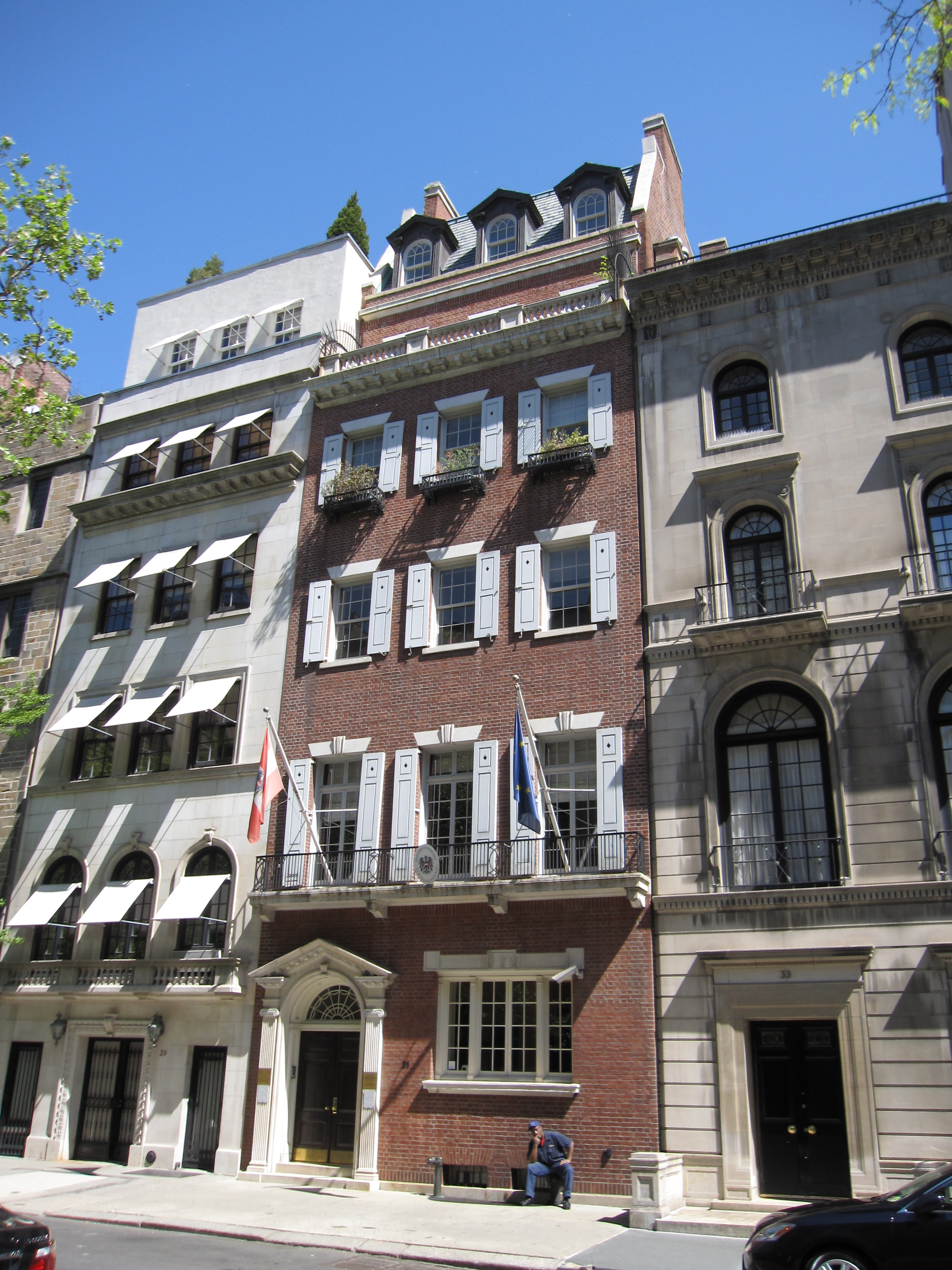
The Augustus G. Paine Jr. House (the Austrian Consulate General in New York since the 1950s).

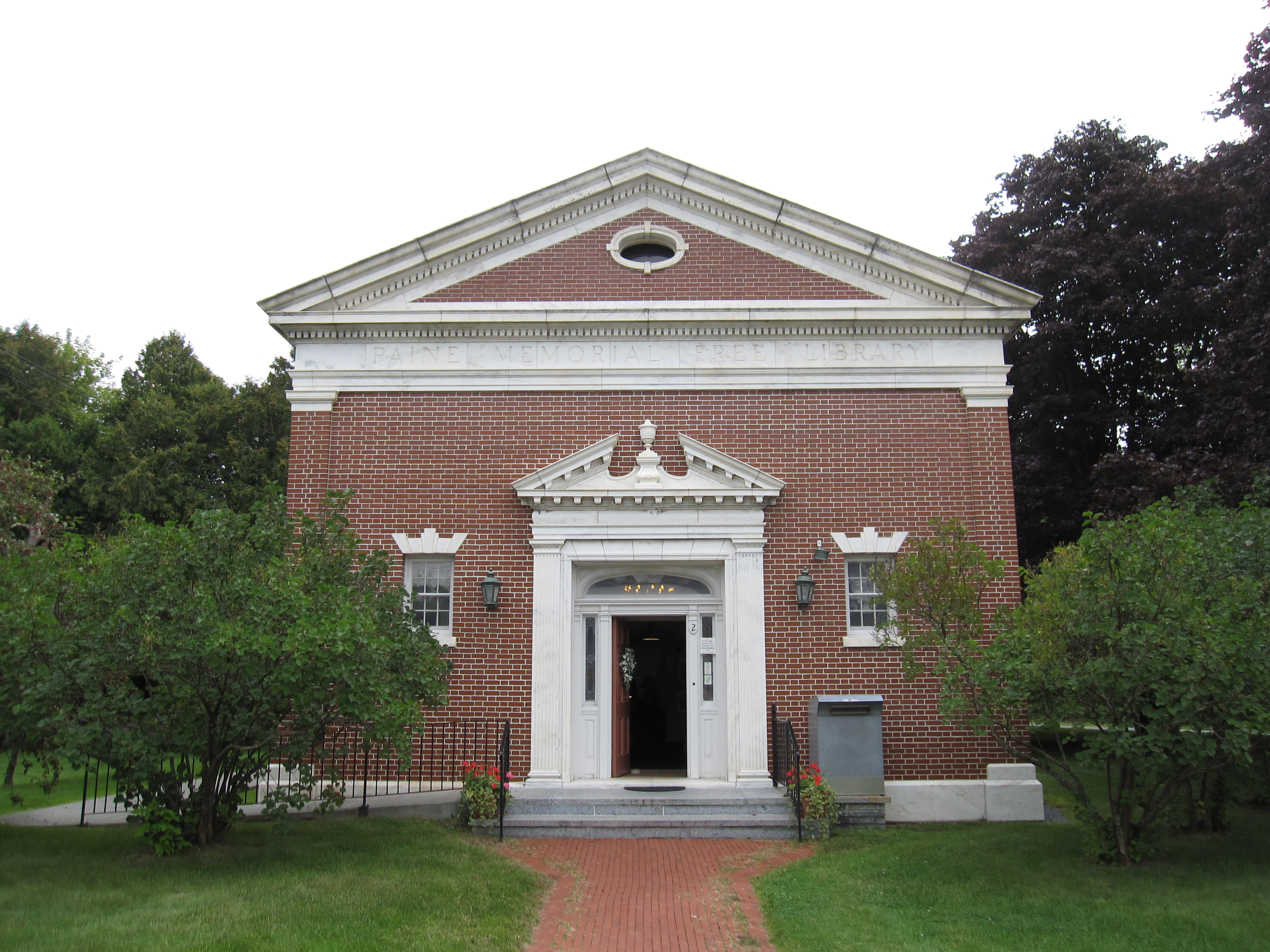
The Paine Memorial Library in Willsboro.

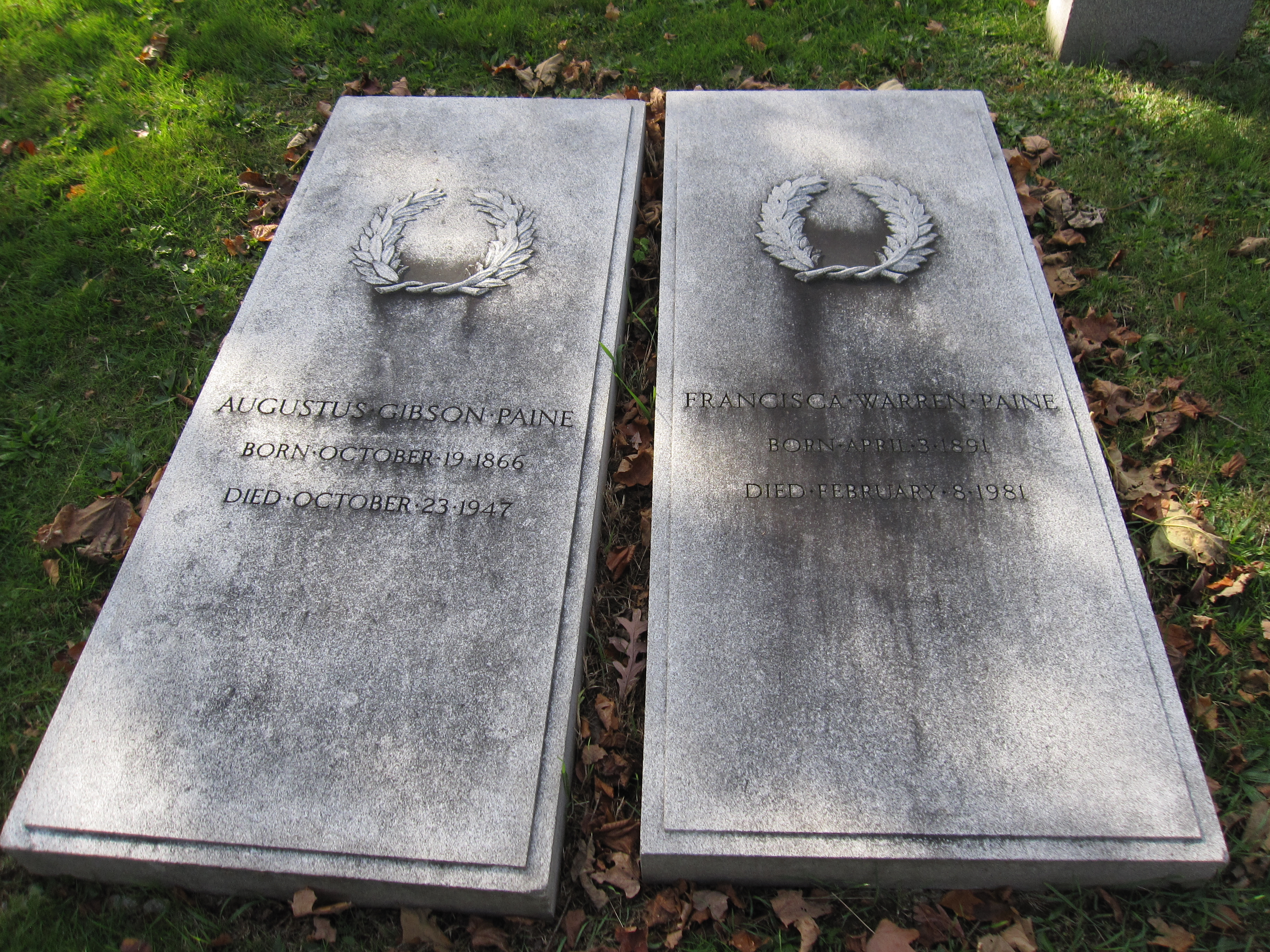
Graves of Augustus G. Paine Jr. and his second wife Francisca Warren in Woodlawn Cemetery, the Bronx

In 1888, he married Maud Eustis Potts (1865–1919), who converted from the Episcopal Church to Catholicism in 1913. Maud was a daughter of George Potts and Mary Laurette (née Eustis) Potts. Together they were the parents of five sons, all of whom married and had children themselves:

- Augustus Gibson Paine III (1891–1938), who married Dorothy Marian Quimby (1893–1937), a daughter of Dr. Charles Elihu Quimby.
- George Eustis Paine (1894–1953), was chairman of the board of the New York and Pennsylvania Co. until his death. He married Helen Ellis (1895–1948). After her death, he married Katryna Ten Broeck Weed (1897–1962), a daughter of New York State Assemblyman George S. Weed, in 1950.
- Alexander Brooks Paine (1898–1976), who married Walburga Kaul Reilly (1902–1942) in 1922. They later divorced before her remarriage and eventual suicide.
- Hugh Eustis Paine (1905–1973), who married Helen Clirehugh Duncan (1906–1992) in 1928.
- Peter Standish Paine (1909-2004), who was president of the New York and Pennsylvania Company. He was also CEO of the Great Northern Nekoosa Corporation. He married Ellen Cadeen Lea, a daughter of Robert C. Lea of Chestnut Hill, in 1933.

Four years after the death of his first wife on June 4, 1919, he married Francisca Machado Warren (1891–1981) at St. John's Memorial Chapel in Cambridge. Francisca daughter of the late Minton Warren, a Latin professor at Johns Hopkins and later Harvard University, and Salomé (née Machado) Warren, who was of Cuban descent. Together Francisca and Augustus were the parents of one daughter:

- Francisca Warren Paine (1928–2016), who married David Irwin.

After a long illness, Paine died on October 23, 1947, at the age of 81 at his home, 31 East 69th Street in Manhattan. He was buried at Woodlawn Cemetery in the Bronx. His widow lived another three decades until her death on February 8, 1981.

=== Descendants ===
Through his second son George, he was a grandfather of New York State Senator George Eustis Paine (1920–1991) who married, and divorced, Joan Widener Leidy, a granddaughter of art collector Joseph E. Widener. He was also a grandfather of Augustus Gibson Paine IV (1919–1993), who was married (and divorced) Iris Vanderbilt Smith (1927–2006), a daughter of Earl E. T. Smith, the former U.S. Ambassador to Cuba and granddaughter of Virginia Fair Vanderbilt and William Kissam Vanderbilt II. Augustus also served as president of New York and Pennsylvania Co. before becoming a partner in the Wall Street firm of Clark, Dodge & Company from 1963 until retiring in 1973.

Through his son Hugh, he was also a grandfather of the actress Molly McGreevy (1936–2015), formerly Mary Wheaton Paine, known for her role as Polly Longworth on the daytime television soap opera Ryan's Hope.

Through his son Peter, he was a grandfather of Peter Standish Paine Jr., a graduate of Princeton University who became a partner in the law firm of Cleary Gottlieb Steen & Hamilton. Paine also served as trustee and president of the Museum of the City of New York.

=== Residences ===
Paine was closely associated with the architect C. P. H. Gilbert, who received a number of commissions from him, such as his townhouse in New York's Upper East Side on 31 East 69th Street in 1917–18. The house was sold to the Austrian government in 1952, the Austrian Consulate General is located in it today. When Paine was based in Willsboro, Gilbert also received commissions from him to construct the Essex County Bank in 1921. In May 1930, Paine donated $150,000 for a library to the town of Willsboro in memory of his mother. Both the bank and the library were constructed by Gilbert in the Neoclassical style.

In 1885, after moving to Willsboro, Paine began buying land in the area, eventually amassing about 1,000 acres (400 ha), including three miles of Lake Champlain shoreline. There he built his Flat Rock Camp compound, which featured extensive gardens, planted on topsoil laid over the sandstone, which were maintained under the guidance of his first wife, Maud, and, after her death, his second wife Francisca and their daughter. The gardens are listed in the Smithsonian Archives of American Gardens. The camp and its surrounding property, which includes wetlands, farmland, orchards and forests, are still owned by the Paine family, but in 1978 they were placed under the stewardship of the Adirondack Nature Conservancy to ensure that the land will not be developed in the future.
