= Sheldon–Owens Farm =

- U.S. National Register of Historic Places
- U.S. Historic district
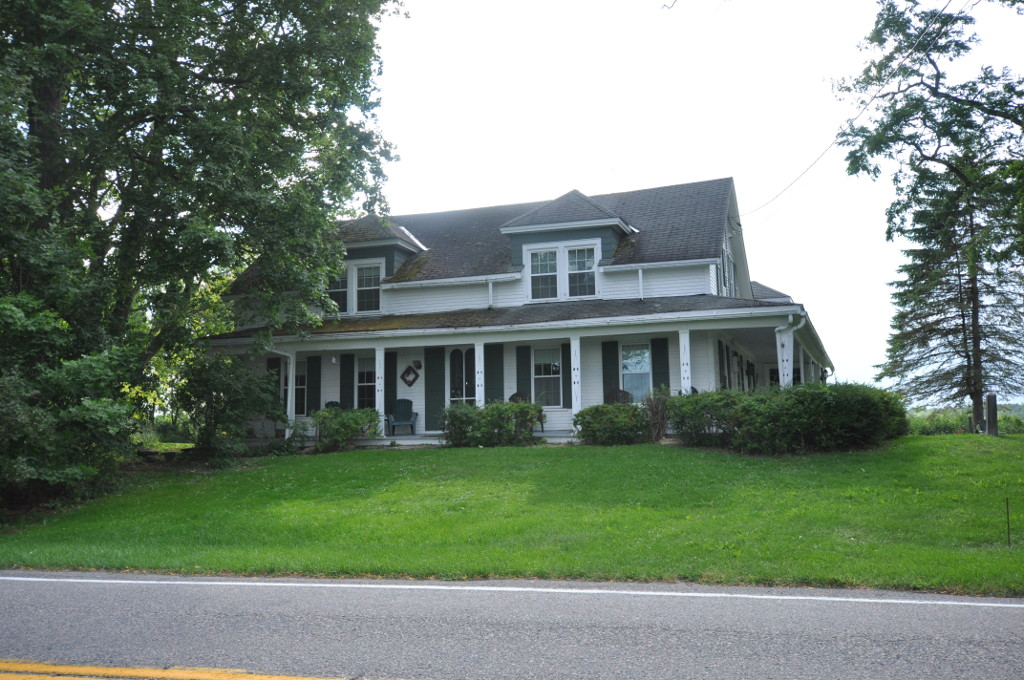

- Location within New York Location within the United States
- Location: Willsboro, New York
- Coordinates: 44°20′44″N 73°22′28″W
- Area: 251 acres (102 ha)
- NRHP reference No.: 93000171
- Added to NRHP: April 1, 1993

Sheldon–Owens Farm is a national historic district located at Willsboro in Essex County, New York. The district contains seven contributing buildings, one contributing site, and seven contributing structures. They are set on a property assembled between 1784 and 1945. The oldest structure is a barn dated to the late 18th century. A number of the outbuildings date to the 1830s and include barns, a granary, brick smokehouse, and sugar house. The farmhouse dates to 1853 and was constructed on the foundation of the 18th-century house. Dated to the early 20th century are a storage shed, machine shed, well house, and additions and renovations to older buildings. The property has been adapted for use as a bird sanctuary.

It was listed on the National Register of Historic Places in 1993.
