= Lillie Hart Gay Torrey =

Hawaiian painter (1871–1956)

- Born: Lillie Hart; August 28, 1871; Kohala, Oahu, Hawaiian Kingdom (now Hawaii)
- Died: October 5, 1956; Honolulu, Oahu, Hawaii
- Other names: Lillie Hart Gay, Lillie Torrey
- Occupation: Painter
- Known for: Floral oil paintings
- Spouse(s): Francis Gay (divorce), George Burroughs Torrey

Lillie Hart Gay Torrey (née Lillie Hart; 1871–1956) was a Hawaiian painter, from Oahu. She was known for her decorative floral oil paintings.

== Life and career ==
Torrey was born on August 28, 1871, in Kohala, Hawaiian Kingdom. Her father, Judge Hart, was of British heritage while her mother was Native Hawaiian. She attended Mills College (now Mills College at Northeastern University) in Oakland, California.

Torrey was married twice, once to Francis Gay with whom she had one son, Ernest. After marriage she lived with her family at Wailele House (1911; English: Leaping Waters House), at 3148 Kalihi Street in Kalihi Valley, which was sometimes referred to as an "artist colony" due to its large size and creative residents. When her son was sent to school in Connecticut, Torrey briefly lived in the Plaza Hotel in New York City.

After a divorce, her second marriage was in November 1924 to American artist George Burroughs Torrey (1863–1942). They lived on 35th Street in New York City, and often travelled to Europe. In the 1930s the couple moved back to Wailele House in Kalihi Valley.

In her painting career, she became known for her decorative paintings of flowers. She was described as being enthusiastic about her work, producing large paintings that were popular with Hawaii's residents.

She died at the age of 85 on October 5, 1956, in St. Francis Hospice, Hawaii in Honolulu.

In 1958, two years after her death and after a sales, her former house in Kalihi Valley caught fire and the upper exterior was destroyed. It was repaired in the 1960s, and maintained a similar layout.
