= Molly McGreevy =

American actress (1936–2015)

- Born: Mary Wheaton Paine; June 11, 1936
- Died: November 1, 2015 (aged 79)
- Occupation: Television actress
- Spouse: Earl Hindman (m. 1976; died 2003)

Molly Wheaton McGreevy (June 11, 1936 – November 1, 2015) was an American actress and later ordained priest, known for her role as Polly Longworth on the daytime television soap opera Ryan's Hope.

== Biography ==
Born Mary Wheaton Paine and called "Molly", she was the daughter of Hugh Eustis Paine, Sr. (died 1973) and Helen Clirehugh Duncan Paine. Her grandfather was the paper manufacturer and banker Augustus G. Paine, Jr. from New York City.

She first married stockbroker Thomas J. McGreevy of Kansas City, Missouri. Together they had three daughters, Pamela, Jessica, and Barbara. The couple divorced in the early 1970s, and she subsequently married Earl Hindman, a film and television actor who played detective Bob Reid on Ryan's Hope and Wilson Wilson Jr. on Home Improvement. One of her first movies was Shoot It Black, Shoot It Blue in 1974, in which she played a salesgirl. She subsequently appeared in the recurring role of wealthy Rae Woodard's gossipy society pal Polly Longworth in Ryan's Hope from 1977 to 1981.

She became an ordained Episcopal priest in the 1980s. She worked at the Church of St. Luke in the Fields, Greenwich Village for many years, ministering to AIDS patients. She and Hindman later moved to Stamford, Connecticut, where she worked as associate rector of St. Francis’ Church until her retirement. Hindman died in Stamford in 2003. In 2008, she moved to a senior community near Rochester, New York. She died on November 1, 2015, aged 79.
