= Willsboro, New York =

- Town
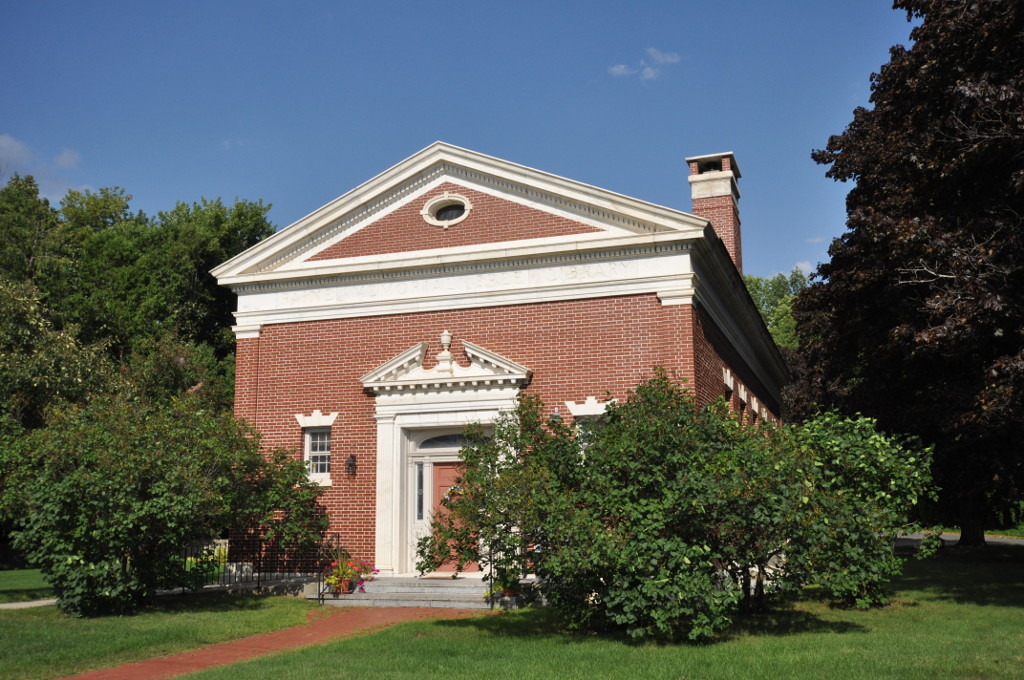
- Paine Memorial Library, built in 1930

- Location in Essex County and the state of New York
- Coordinates: 44°22′29″N 73°24′24″W
- Country: United States
- State: New York
- County: Essex

Government
  - Type: Town Council
  - Town Supervisor: Shaun Gillilland (R)
  - Town Council: Members' List: • Spencer R. Stafford, Sr. (R); • Charles Lustig, Jr. (R); • Steven K. Benway (D); • Nancy E. Huestis (R)

Area
  - Total: 73.38 sq mi (190.06 km^{2})
  - Land: 42.71 sq mi (110.62 km^{2})
  - Water: 30.67 sq mi (79.44 km^{2})
- Elevation: 128 ft (39 m)

Population (2020)
  - Total: 1,905
  - Density: 44.6/sq mi (17.22/km^{2})
- Time zone: UTC-5 (Eastern (EST))
  - Summer (DST): UTC-4 (EDT)
- ZIP Codes: 12996 (Willsboro); 12944 (Keeseville)
- Area code: 518
- FIPS code: 36-031-82271
- GNIS feature ID: 0979643
- Website: townofwillsborony.gov

Willsboro is a town in Essex County, New York, United States, and lies 30 miles (48 km) south of the city of Plattsburgh. As of the 2020 census, the town's population was 1,905. The town is named after early landowner William Gilliland.

== History ==
During the American Revolution, British troops under John Burgoyne camped on the Bouquet River.

The region was first settled by Europeans in 1765 by William Gilliland. Originally called "Milltown" by its founder (for the sawmill he located on the falls of the Bouquet River, located in the center of the town), it was renamed "Willsborough" (subsequently shortened to "Willsboro") shortly after the Revolutionary War, in honor of the founder.

The town has always had a thriving agricultural and tourism tradition, though the Industrial Revolution made its mark on the community as well. Through much of its history, Willsboro's main employer was a paper mill (which produced the wood pulp used in the manufacture of paper). A blue limestone quarry was also an important industry locally. The stone quarried from this mine was utilized in the construction of the Albany State Capitol and the Brooklyn Bridge.

One of the noted residents was the paper manufacturer Augustus G. Paine, Jr., who resided in Willsboro for a portion of the year, when he was not in New York, since his large business was located in Willsboro. He commissioned the architect C. P. H. Gilbert to construct the Essex County Bank in 1921. In May 1930, Paine donated a whole library to the town of Willsboro, in memory of his mother, in the sum of $150,000. Both the bank and the library were constructed by Gilbert in the Neoclassical style.

Paine also had Flat Rock Camp, his summer retreat on the shores of Lake Champlain, constructed for his family.

After the Second World War, the paper industry started to decline, and when the paper mill closed in the 1960s the town faced economic difficulties. In order to compensate for the loss, the community relied heavily on tourist dollars, focusing on the scenic landscape, lake frontage, and lush wilderness the area offered visitors. Recently, new industries have moved to the town, most notably a wollastonite mine, curtain and furniture manufacturers, and numerous web-based service companies. Willsboro is also becoming a bedroom community for the city of Plattsburgh to the north.

The Adsit Log House, Abraham Aiken House, Flat Rock Camp, Ligonier Point Historic District, Sheldon–Owens Farm, Willsboro Congregational Church, and The Willsboro School are listed on the National Register of Historic Places.

== Geography ==
According to the United States Census Bureau, the town has a total area of 73.4 square miles (190.1 km^{2}), of which 42.7 square miles (110.7 km^{2}) is land and 30.7 square miles (79.4 km^{2}), or 41.80%, is water.

The eastern town line, marked by Lake Champlain, is the border of Vermont. The Boquet River enters Lake Champlain in the town, east of Willsboro village.

New York State Route 22 is a north–south highway which passes through Willsboro.

== Demographics ==
Historical population
| Census | Pop. | Note | %± |
|---|---|---|---|
| 1820 | 888 | | — |
| 1830 | 1,316 | | 48.2% |
| 1840 | 1,658 | | 26.0% |
| 1850 | 1,932 | | 16.5% |
| 1860 | 1,519 | | −21.4% |
| 1870 | 1,719 | | 13.2% |
| 1880 | 1,450 | | −15.6% |
| 1890 | 1,568 | | 8.1% |
| 1900 | 1,522 | | −2.9% |
| 1910 | 1,580 | | 3.8% |
| 1920 | 1,684 | | 6.6% |
| 1930 | 1,612 | | −4.3% |
| 1940 | 1,780 | | 10.4% |
| 1950 | 1,646 | | −7.5% |
| 1960 | 1,716 | | 4.3% |
| 1970 | 1,688 | | −1.6% |
| 1980 | 1,759 | | 4.2% |
| 1990 | 1,736 | | −1.3% |
| 2000 | 1,903 | | 9.6% |
| 2010 | 2,025 | | 6.4% |
| 2020 | 1,905 | | −5.9% |
U.S. Decennial Census

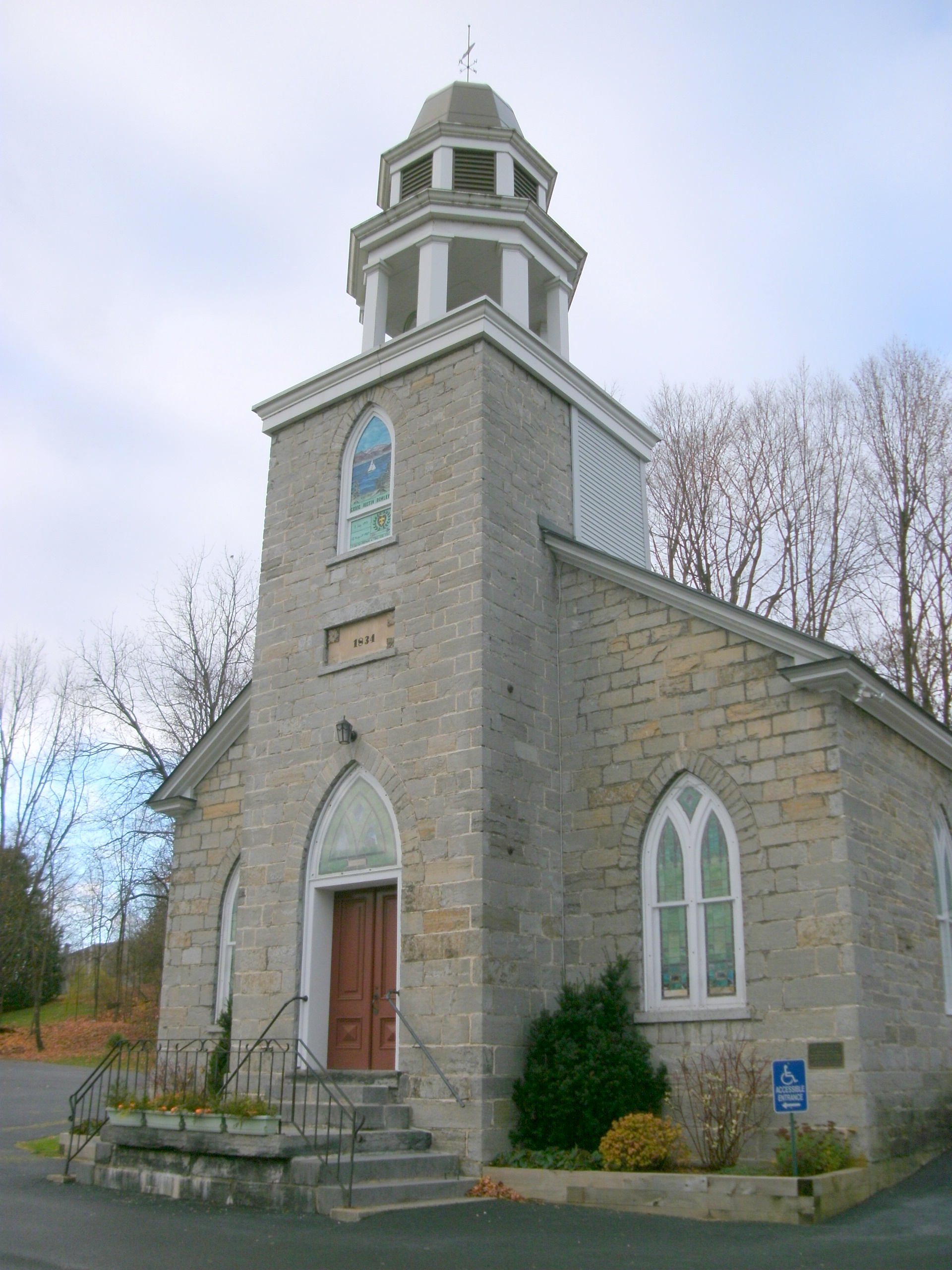
Willsboro Congregational Church

As of the census of 2000, there were 1,903 people, 803 households, and 549 families residing in the town. The population density was 44.6 inhabitants per square mile (17.2/km^{2}). There were 1,468 housing units at an average density of 34.4 per square mile (13.3/km^{2}). The racial makeup of the town was 98.42% White, 0.26% African American, 0.47% Native American, 0.26% from other races, and 0.58% from two or more races. Hispanic or Latino of any race were 0.47% of the population.

There were 803 households, out of which 26.4% had children under the age of 18 living with them, 54.9% were married couples living together; 9.3% had a female householder with no husband present, and 31.6% were non-families. 24.5% of all households were made up of individuals, and 14.3% had someone living alone who was 65 years of age or older. The average household size was 2.35 and the average family size was 2.77.

In the town, the population was spread out, with 21.5% under the age of 18, 5.9% from 18 to 24, 26.5% from 25 to 44, 25.6% from 45 to 64, and 20.4% who were 65 years of age or older. The median age was 42 years. For every 100 females, there were 99.5 males. For every 100 females age 18 and over, there were 96.4 males.

The median income for a household in the town was $36,715, and the median income for a family was $40,272. Males had a median income of $30,244 versus $20,917 for females. The per capita income for the town was $20,209. About 3.8% of families and 9.5% of the population were below the poverty line, including 8.7% of those under age 18 and 6.7% of those age 65 or over.

== Notable people ==
- Sophie Clarke, winner of Survivor: South Pacific
- Hugh Pool, master blues musician and record producer

== Communities and locations in Willsboro ==
- Farrell Point – A projection into the southern end of Willsboro Bay.
- Hatch Point – The northernmost part of the town, on the northern tip of Willsboro Point.
- Highland Forge Lake – A lake by the northern town line, north of Long Pond.
- Jones Point/Flat Rock Point – A projection into Lake Champlain, northeast of Willsboro village.
- Long Pond – A pond near the northern town line.
- Pok-O-Maccready; A local summer camp which has been in existence since 1904 and is the oldest family run camp in the United States.
- Reber – A hamlet in the southwestern part of the town, on County Road 14.
- Willsboro – The hamlet of Willsboro is in the eastern part of the town on NY-22, near the point where the Boquet River enters Lake Champlain. It is also a resort community.
- Willsboro Bay – A bay of Lake Champlain between Willsboro Point and the mainland.
- Willsboro Point – A peninsula in Lake Champlain.
- Willsboro Point – A hamlet on the eastern shore of Willsboro Point on County Road 27. Edgewater Farm was listed on the National Register of Historic Places in 1988.

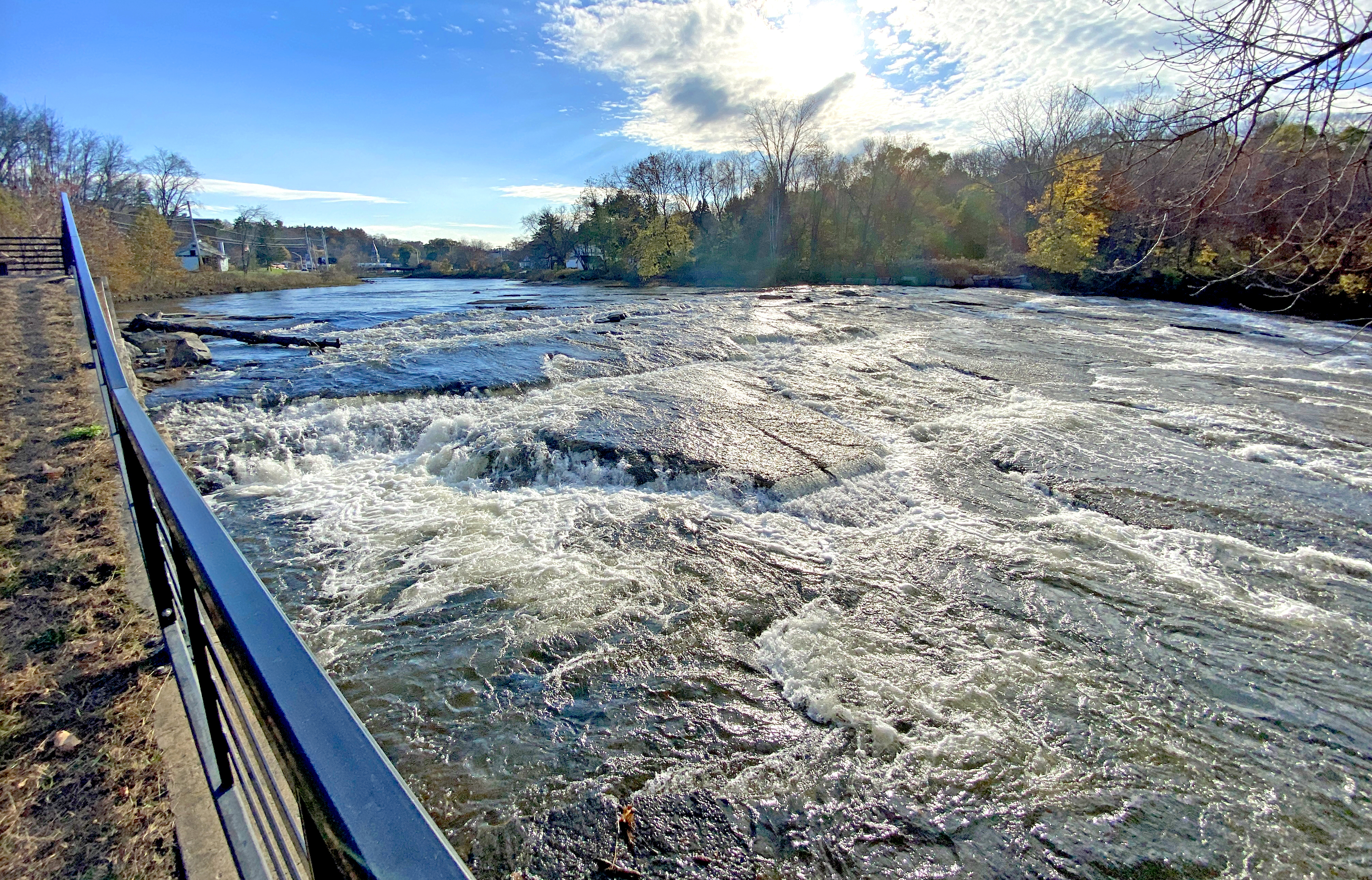
View of the Boquet River in Willsboro, New York. Taken in the fall of 2023.
