= Sean McGreevy =

Antrim Gaelic footballer

Sean McGreevy is a Gaelic footballer who has played goalkeeper at senior level for the Antrim county team since making his championship debut in 1993.

== Career ==
A sales rep, McGreevy made his senior inter-county debut against the then defending All-Ireland SFC winners Donegal in front of 30,000 fans at MacCumhaill Park in Ballybofey, County Donegal. Antrim sustained a three-point loss to Brian McEniff's side.

McGreevy, born in Belfast, Northern Ireland, also had spells playing association football in the Irish League with Cliftonville Donegal Celtic, Ballyclare Comrades and Omagh Town, turned down many offers to play the game full-time due to his commitments to Antrim and club, St Paul's.

McGreevy experienced many years of hardship with Antrim, one of the weaker footballing counties in Ireland, but rose to prominence in 2000 when he was an outstanding performer in Antrim's first Ulster Championship win for 18 years. Antrim defeated Down at Casement Park in the quarter-final of the Ulster Championship, with McGreevy saving a Gregory McCartan penalty - one of two McCartan hit that day - on a memorable occasion. His performances in that game and in the semi-final and replay with Derry, earned McGreevy an All Star nomination.

In 2007, he was part of the Antrim side that Wicklow defeated in the final seconds of the Tommy Murphy Cup final at Croke Park. In 2008, however, he returned to Croke Park with Antrim and experienced victory over the holders. It was the first senior trophy football Antrim had won since lifting the 1999 All-Ireland B title. McGreevy played in that final too, beating Fermanagh.

Following some successful spells with Antrim Football, which featured Antrim's first Ulster Football Final in 36 years in 2010 v Tyrone, (McGreevy was instrumental in getting the county past Donegal in the first round, only to have his season hampered by an injury sustained during the match). McGreevy was still involved with the Antrim senior football panel, after being recalled at 40 years of age in 2013. McGreevy lines out as the St Paul's GAC goalkeeper in the Division One Football League in Antrim.

At 50 years of age, McGreevy represented Ireland Over 50s in two victorious test wins against Australia in the International Rules series.

He currently plays for the Antrim Masters alongside his brother James McGreevy who plays as NO-10.

== Personal life ==
McGreevy is one of eight children, with four brothers and three sisters. He is the younger brother of Sports Journalist, Author and PR specialist Alex; Antrim ladies' coaches, Barry, Sandy, and James. All of them played for the St Paul's club in Belfast. He has a wife called Laura and two kids called Lucia and Caden McGreevy.
