= MacGreevy =

MacGreevy is a surname. Notable people with the surname include:

- Oliver MacGreevy (1928–1981), Irish actor
- Thomas MacGreevy (1893–1967), Irish poet

== See also ==
- McGreevy
- McGreevey
