= Willsboro (CDP), New York =

Willsboro, New York
- Census-designated place
- Location within New York
- Coordinates: 44°21′28″N 73°23′28″W
- Country: United States
- State: New York
- County: Essex
- Town: Willsboro

Area
  - Total: 1.96 sq mi (5.07 km^{2})
  - Land: 1.91 sq mi (4.95 km^{2})
  - Water: 0.042 sq mi (0.11 km^{2})
- Elevation: 223 ft (68 m)

Population (2020)
  - Total: 689
  - Density: 360/sq mi (139.1/km^{2})
- Time zone: UTC-5 (Eastern (EST))
  - Summer (DST): UTC-4 (EDT)
- ZIP code: 12996
- FIPS code: 36-82260

Willsboro is a hamlet and census-designated place (CDP) in the town of Willsboro in Essex County, New York, United States. The population of the CDP was 753 at the 2010 census, out of a total town population of 2,025.

== Geography ==
Willsboro hamlet is located in the center of the town of Willsboro, along the Boquet River, a tributary of Lake Champlain. New York State Route 22 is the main road through the community, leading north 30 miles (48 km) to Plattsburgh and south 15 miles (24 km) to Westport. Interstate 87 is 8.5 miles (13.7 km) to the northwest via NY 22.

According to the United States Census Bureau, the Willsboro CDP has a total area of 1.96 square miles (5.07 km^{2}), of which 1.92 square miles (4.98 km^{2}) is land and 0.03 square miles (0.09 km^{2}), or 1.69%, is water.

== Demographics ==
Historical population
Census	Pop.	Note	%±
2020	689		—
U.S. Decennial Census

== Education ==
The census-designated place is in the Willsboro Central School District.
