= Willsboro Point, New York =

- Census-designated place
- Location within New York Location within the United States
- Coordinates: 44°24′31″N 73°22′38″W
- Country: United States
- State: New York
- County: Essex
- Town: Willsboro

Area
  - Total: 6.39 sq mi (16.56 km^{2})
  - Land: 2.78 sq mi (7.21 km^{2})
  - Water: 3.61 sq mi (9.35 km^{2})
- Elevation: 151 ft (46 m)

Population (2020)
  - Total: 382
  - Density: 137.3/sq mi (53.01/km^{2})
- Time zone: UTC-5 (Eastern (EST))
  - Summer (DST): UTC-4 (EDT)
- ZIP Code: 12996 (Willsboro)
- Area codes: 518/838
- FIPS code: 36-82282
- GNIS feature ID: 2812766

Willsboro Point is a census-designated place (CDP) that occupies a peninsula of the same name in Lake Champlain in the United States. The community is in the town of Willsboro in Essex County, New York. It was first listed as a CDP prior to the 2020 census. As of the 2020 census, Willsboro Point had a population of 382.

The peninsula is in northeastern Essex County, in the northeastern section of Willsboro, and it extends northward 3.5 miles (5.6 km) into Lake Champlain, with the main body of the lake to the east and Willsboro Bay to the west. The hamlet of Willsboro Point is on the eastern shore of the peninsula, closer to the southern end. It is 4 miles (6 km) north of Willsboro hamlet and 9 miles (14 km) southwest across the lake from Burlington, Vermont.

== Demographics ==
Historical population
Census	Pop.	Note	%±
2020	382		—
U.S. Decennial Census

== Education ==
The census-designated place is in the Willsboro Central School District.
