= William McGreevey =

American economist (born 1938)

William Paul McGreevey (born April 13, 1938) is an economist focused on health care and development. He serves as associate professor in the Department of International Health at Georgetown University, where he teaches on the political economy of health and development. As a consulting economist, he provides services on international development and health issues to UNAIDS and its ten co-sponsors, the World Bank, Palladium International (formerly branded Futures Group and Futures Institute), RUSH Foundation and Copenhagen Consensus, and Results for Development Institute.

In 1960, McGreevey graduated cum laude with a BA in economics from Ohio State University, where he was inducted into Phi Beta Kappa. He earned a PhD in economics from MIT in 1965. He later published his revised dissertation with Cambridge University Press (CUP) in 1971 as An economic history of Colombia, 1845–1930. It was reissued in 2007 as a paperback by CUP. A new Spanish edition is planned for publication by Universidad de los Andes, Bogotá.

McGreevey's subsequent work focuses on strengthening health systems in developing countries; a chapter, "Strengthening health systems", appears in Bjorn Lomborg, ed., Rethink HIV. In 2010 he prepared reports for DfID and the Global Fund on resource requirements for HIV and AIDS in People's Republic of China; for Nigeria's National Health Insurance Scheme on benefits and costs of covering reproductive health services; UNAIDS and Futures Institute for resource requirements in the Latin America and Asia regions; and, aids2031 for a comprehensive report on future resource needs through the year 2031. At the World Bank from 1980 to 1997, he worked on poverty and living standards, urban, health, nutrition, and population projects, and managed training for Bank staff in these areas. In 1980, he edited the collection Third world poverty, new strategies for measuring development progress. As of 2018, his research has an h-index of 19.

He now serves as sector chair for the HNP sector and member of the board of directors of the 1818 Society for World Bank retirees. He was chair of the Center for Latin American Studies and taught economic history at University of California, Berkeley in the 1960s. He came to Washington, DC in 1971 where he has worked at the OAS, Smithsonian Institution, Battelle Memorial Institute, World Bank, Futures Group, and Georgetown University.

== Personal life ==
In 1983, McGreevey married to Shaun Elaine Murphy, director of the Urban Institute Press. For both it is their second marriage.

== Selected publications ==
- With Carlos Avila and Mary Punchak, "Strengthening health systems," in Bjorn Lomborg, ed., Rethink HIV: Smarter ways to invest in ending HIV in Sub-Saharan Africa, Cambridge University Press, 2012, pp. 183–212.
- With Brian Briscombe. 2010. Costs and Benefits Study of the NHIS/MDG Maternal and Child Health Project. Health Policy Initiative, Futures Group, Washington DC.
- With Wang Weibing and others. 2009. Type 2 diabetes mellitus in China: a preventable economic burden. The American journal of managed care 15, 9, 593–601.
- With Robert Hecht and others 2009. Critical choices in financing the response to the global HIV/AIDS pandemic. Health affairs 28, 6, 1591–1605.
- With J Hammer, L MacKellar, and A Acharya. 2008. Propinquity Matters: How better health, urbanization, and total factor productivity grew together, 1870–2008; Georgetown Journal of Poverty Law & Policy XVI, 3, 605–33.
- With Carlos Avila, Jose-Antonio Izazola, and Natalie Menser. 2009. HIV and AIDS programs – how they support health system strengthening. Results for Development Working Paper.
- Ed., Third world poverty, new strategies for measuring development progress; Lexington Books, D.C. Heath, Lexington MA, 1980.
- An economic history of Colombia, 1845–1930; Cambridge University Press, Cambridge and New York, 1971, reprinted 2008; Spanish ed., trans., Haroldo Calvo, Ediciones Tercer Mundo, Bogotá, 1971; reprinted 1975, 1978, 1982, 2005.
