= List of places in New York: M =

This list of current cities, towns, unincorporated communities, counties, and other recognized places in the U.S. state of New York also includes information on the number and names of counties in which the place lies, and its lower and upper zip code bounds, if applicable.

List of places in New York: A | B | C | D | E | F | G | H | I | J | K | L | M | N | O | P | Q | R | S | T | U | V | W | X | Y | Z

Name of place	Counties	Principal county	Lower zip code	Upper zip code
Mabbettsville	1	Dutchess County	12545	
McClure	1	Broome County	13754	
McColloms	1	Franklin County		
McConnellsville	1	Oneida County	13401	
McCormack Corners	1	Albany County	12303	
MacDonnell Heights	1	Dutchess County	12603	
McDonough	1	Chenango County	13801	
MacDougall	1	Seneca County	14541	
McDuffie Town	1	Seneca County		
Macedon	1	Wayne County	14502	
Macedon Center	1	Wayne County	14502	
McEwens Corners	1	St. Lawrence County	12967	
McGraw	1	Cortland County	13101	
McGraws	1	Steuben County		
McGrawville	1	Allegany County	14777	
Machias	1	Cattaraugus County	14101	
Machias Junction	1	Cattaraugus County		
McIntyre	1	Dutchess County		
McKeever	1	Herkimer County	13338	
Mackey	1	Schoharie County	12076	
McKinley	1	Montgomery County	13428	
McKinneys	1	Tompkins County		
McKinneys Point	1	Tompkins County	14850	
McKinstry Hollow	1	Cattaraugus County	14042	
McKown Park	1	Albany County	12203	
McKownville	1	Albany County	12203	
McKownville Estates	1	Albany County	12203	
McLaughlin Acres	1	Putnam County	10541	
McLean	1	Tompkins County	13102	
McLean Heights	1	Westchester County		
McNalls	1	Niagara County	14067	
Macomb	1	St. Lawrence County		
McPherson Cove	1	Livingston County		
McPherson Point	1	Livingston County	14487	
McQueens	1	Livingston County		
Madawaska	1	St. Lawrence County		
Madison	1	Madison County	13402	
Madison Center	1	Madison County	13042	
Madison Park	1	Suffolk County	11731	
Madison Square	1	New York County	10010	
Madrid	1	St. Lawrence County	13660	
Madrid Springs	1	St. Lawrence County	13660	
Magee	1	Seneca County		
Magnolia	1	Chautauqua County	14757	
Mahopac	1	Putnam County	10541	
Mahopac Falls	1	Putnam County	10542	
Mahopac Hills	1	Putnam County	10541	
Mahopac Mines	1	Putnam County		
Mahopac Point	1	Putnam County	10541	
Mahopac Ridge	1	Putnam County	10541	
Maidstone Park	1	Suffolk County	11937	
Maine	1	Broome County	13802	
Main-Mill	1	Erie County	14221	
Main Settlement	1	Cattaraugus County	14770	
Main Village	1	Erie County	14221	
Malba	1	Queens County		
Malcon	1	Seneca County		
Malden	1	Ulster County		
Malden Bridge	1	Columbia County	12115	
Malden-on-Hudson	1	Ulster County	12453	
Mall	1	Suffolk County	11706	
Mallory	1	Oswego County	13103	
Malone	1	Franklin County	12953	
Malone Junction	1	Franklin County		
Malta	1	Saratoga County	12020	
Malta Ridge	1	Saratoga County	12020	
Maltaville	1	Saratoga County	12020	
Maltbie Heights	1	Cattaraugus County	14070	
Malverne	1	Nassau County	11565	
Malverne Park Oaks	1	Nassau County		
Malvic Manor	1	Onondaga County	13088	
Mamakating	1	Sullivan County		
Mamakating Park	1	Sullivan County	12790	
Mamaroneck	1	Westchester County	10543	
Manchester	1	Ontario County	14504	
Manchester Bridge	1	Dutchess County	12603	
Mandana	1	Onondaga County	13152	
Manhasset	1	Nassau County	11030	
Manhasset Hills	1	Nassau County	11040	
Manhattan	1	New York County		
Manhattan Beach	1	Kings County		
Manhattan Park	1	Westchester County		
Manhattanville	1	New York County	10027	
Manheim	1	Herkimer County		
Manheim Center	1	Herkimer County	13365	
Manitou	1	Putnam County	10524	
Manitou Beach	1	Monroe County	14468	
Manlius	1	Onondaga County	13104	
Manlius Center	1	Onondaga County	13066	
Manning	1	Orleans County	14470	
Mannings Cove	1	Saratoga County		
Manningville	1	Broome County		
Mannsville	1	Jefferson County	13661	
Mannville	1	Albany County	12189	
Manny Corners	1	Montgomery County	12010	
Manorhaven	1	Nassau County	11050	
Manor Kill	1	Schoharie County	12076	
Manorton	1	Columbia County	12523	
Manorville	1	Suffolk County	11949	
Manorville	1	Ulster County	12477	
Mansfield	1	Cattaraugus County		
Mapes	1	Allegany County		
Maple Bay	1	Chautauqua County	14710	
Maple Beach	1	Livingston County		
Maplecrest	1	Greene County	12454	
Mapledale	1	Oneida County		
Mapledale	1	Ulster County	12406	
Maple Flats	1	Oneida County		
Maple Glen	1	Sullivan County		
Maple Grove	2	Fulton County	12134	
Maple Grove	2	Hamilton County	12134	
Maple Grove	1	Onondaga County		
Maple Grove	1	Otsego County	13808	
Maple Grove	1	Rensselaer County		
Maple Hill	1	Oswego County		
Maple Hill	1	Ulster County	12401	
Maplehurst	1	Cattaraugus County	14743	
Maple Point	1	Chautauqua County		
Maples	1	Cattaraugus County	14755	
Maple Shade	1	Saratoga County		
Maple Springs	1	Chautauqua County	14756	
Mapleton	1	Cayuga County	13021	
Mapleton	1	Niagara County		
Mapletown	1	Montgomery County	13317	
Maple Transit	1	Erie County	14221	
Maple Valley	1	Otsego County	13488	
Maple View	1	Oswego County	13107	
Maplewood	1	Albany County	12189	
Maplewood	1	Monroe County		
Maplewood	1	Sullivan County	12701	
Maplewood	1	Westchester County		
Marathon	1	Cortland County	13803	
Marathon (town), New York	1	Cortland County		
Marble Hill	1	New York County	10463	
Marbletown	1	Ulster County	12401	
Marbletown	1	Wayne County	14513	
Marcellus	1	Onondaga County	13108	
Marcellus Falls	1	Onondaga County	13108	
Marcy	1	Kings County	11206	
Marcy	1	Oneida County	13403	
Marengo	1	Wayne County	14433	
Margaretville	1	Delaware County	12455	
Mariandale	1	Westchester County		
Mariaville	1	Schenectady County	12137	
Mariaville Lake	1	Schenectady County		
Marietta	1	Onondaga County	13110	
Marilla	1	Erie County	14102	
Marine Hospital	1	Richmond County	10301	
Mariners Harbor	1	Richmond County	10303	
Marion	1	Wayne County	14505	
Mariposa	1	Chenango County	13155	
Market	1	Dutchess County		
Market	1	Erie County	14203	
Markhams	1	Cattaraugus County	14070	
Marlboro	1	Kings County	11223	
Marlboro	1	Ulster County	12542	
Marlborough	1	Ulster County		
Marquette	1	Erie County	14217	
Marshall	1	Allegany County	14711	
Marshall	1	Oneida County		
Marshalls	1	Steuben County		
Marshfield	1	Erie County	14091	
Marshville	1	Montgomery County	13317	
Marshville	1	St. Lawrence County	13652	
Martin	1	Monroe County		
Martindale	1	Columbia County		
Martindale Depot	1	Columbia County	12521	
Martin Luther King, Jr.	1	New York County		
Martinsburg	1	Lewis County	13404	
Martinsville	1	Niagara County		
Martinsville	1	Wyoming County		
Martin Van Buren National Historic Site	1	Columbia County	12106	
Martisco	1	Onondaga County	13108	
Martville	1	Cayuga County	13111	
Marvin	1	Chautauqua County		
Marycrest	1	Orange County		
Maryknoll	1	Westchester County	10545	
Maryland	1	Otsego County	12116	
Marymount	1	Westchester County	10591	
Marymount College	1	Westchester County		
Marysville	1	Onondaga County		
Masonville	1	Delaware County	13804	
Masonville	1	Delaware County		
Maspeth	1	Queens County	11378	
Massapequa	1	Nassau County	11758	
Massapequa Park	1	Nassau County	11762	
Massawepie	1	St. Lawrence County	12986	
Massena	1	St. Lawrence County	13662	
Massena Center	1	St. Lawrence County	13662	
Massena Springs	1	St. Lawrence County	13662	
Masten Lake	1	Sullivan County	12790	
Mastic	1	Suffolk County	11950	
Mastic Beach	1	Suffolk County	11951	
Mastic-Shirley	1	Suffolk County		
Matinecock	1	Nassau County	11560	
Matteawan	1	Dutchess County	12508	
Matteawan State Hospital	1	Dutchess County	12508	
Mattituck	1	Suffolk County	11952	
Mattydale	1	Onondaga County	13211	
Maxwell	1	Livingston County		
Maybrook	1	Orange County	12543	
Maybury Mills	1	Cortland County	13101	
Mayfair	1	Schenectady County	12302	
Mayfield	1	Fulton County	12117	
Maynard	1	Oneida County		
Mays Mills	1	Yates County		
Mays Point	1	Seneca County		
Mayville	1	Chautauqua County	14757	
Maywood	1	Albany County	12205	
Maywood	1	Suffolk County	11701	
Meacham	1	Nassau County	11003	
Meadowbrook	1	Orange County	12550	
Meadowdale	1	Albany County	12009	
Meadowmere Park	1	Nassau County	11559	
Meadow Run	1	Erie County	14075	
Meadows	1	Monroe County	14420	
Meadow Wood	1	Monroe County		
Meads Corners	1	Putnam County		
Meads Creek	2	Schuyler County	14870	
Meads Creek	2	Steuben County	14870	
Mechanicstown	1	Orange County	10940	
Mechanicville	1	Saratoga County	12118	
Mecklenburg	1	Schuyler County	14863	
Meco	1	Fulton County	12078	
Mecox	1	Suffolk County	11976	
Medford	1	Suffolk County	11763	
Medina	1	Orleans County	14103	
Medusa	1	Albany County	12120	
Medway	1	Greene County	12042	
Melcourt	1	Bronx County	10451	
Mellenville	1	Columbia County	12544	
Melody Lake	1	Sullivan County		
Melrose	1	Bronx County	10455	10456
Melrose	1	Rensselaer County	12121	
Melrose Junction	1	Bronx County		
Melrose Park	1	Cayuga County		
Melville	1	Suffolk County	11747	
Melvin Hill	1	Ontario County		
Memphis	1	Onondaga County	13112	
Menands	1	Albany County	12204	
Mendon	1	Monroe County	14506	
Mendon Center	1	Monroe County	14472	
Mendon Farms	1	Monroe County	14506	
Meno	1	Franklin County		
Menteth Point	1	Ontario County	14424	
Mentz	1	Cayuga County		
Meredith	1	Delaware County	13753	
Meridale	1	Delaware County	13806	
Meridian	1	Cayuga County	13113	
Merillon Avenue	1	Nassau County		
Merrick	1	Nassau County	11566	
Merrick Corner	1	Oneida County		
Merrickville	1	Delaware County	13839	
Merriewold	1	Sullivan County	12701	
Merriewold Lake	1	Orange County	10950	
Merriewold Park	1	Sullivan County		
Merrifield	1	Cayuga County	13147	
Merrill	1	Clinton County	12955	
Merrillsville	1	Madison County	13421	
Merrilville	1	Franklin County	12986	
Merriweather Campus	1	Nassau County	11548	
Mertensia	1	Ontario County	14564	
Messenger Bay	1	Madison County		
Messengerville	1	Cortland County	13803	
Methol	1	Delaware County		
Metropolitan	1	Kings County	11206	
Mettacahonts	1	Ulster County	12404	
Mexico	1	Oswego County	13114	
Mexico	1	Oswego County		
Michigan Corners	1	Orange County		
Michigan Mills	1	Lewis County		
Middle Bridge	1	Chenango County	13730	
Middleburgh	1	Schoharie County	12122	
Middleburgh	1	Schoharie County	12122	
Middlebury	1	Wyoming County		
Middle Falls	1	Washington County	12848	
Middlefield	1	Otsego County	13405	
Middlefield	1	Otsego County		
Middlefield Center	1	Otsego County	13320	
Middle Granville	1	Washington County	12849	
Middle Grove	1	Saratoga County	12850	
Middle Hope	1	Orange County	12550	
Middlehope	1	Orange County		
Middle Island	1	Suffolk County	11953	
Middleport	1	Madison County	13346	
Middleport	1	Niagara County	14105	
Middlesex	1	Yates County	14507	
Middlesex	1	Yates County		
Middle Sprite	1	Fulton County		
Middletown	1	Delaware County		
Middletown	1	Orange County	10940	
Middletown and Unionville Junction	1	Orange County		
Middletown State Hospital	1	Orange County		
Middle Village	1	Otsego County		
Middle Village	1	Queens County	11379	
Middleville	1	Herkimer County	13406	
Middleville	1	Suffolk County	11768	
Midhampton	1	Suffolk County		
Midland Beach	1	Richmond County	10306	
Midtown	1	New York County	10018	
Midtown Plaza	1	Monroe County	14604	
Midway	1	Chemung County	14864	
Midway	1	Tompkins County		
Midway Park	1	Chautauqua County		
Midwood	1	Kings County	11230	
Milan	1	Dutchess County	12571	
Milan	1	Dutchess County		
Milburn	1	Orange County		
Mile of Woods	1	Monroe County		
Mileses	1	Sullivan County	12741	
Milford	1	Otsego County	13807	
Milford	1	Otsego County		
Milford Center	1	Otsego County	13820	
Mill Brook	1	Bronx County	10454	
Millbrook	1	Dutchess County	12545	
Millbrook Heights	1	Dutchess County	12545	
Millen Bay	1	Jefferson County	13618	
Miller Corners	1	Montgomery County		
Miller Place	1	Suffolk County	11764	
Millers	1	Orleans County	14098	
Millers Corners	1	Rensselaer County		
Millers Mills	1	Herkimer County	13491	
Millersport	1	Erie County	14051	
Millerton	1	Dutchess County	12546	
Millertown	1	Rensselaer County	12094	
Mill Grove	1	Cattaraugus County	14770	
Millgrove	1	Erie County		
Mill Hook	1	Ulster County	12404	
Mill Neck	1	Nassau County	11765	
Mill Point	1	Montgomery County	12010	
Millport	1	Chemung County	14864	
Mills	1	Cortland County		
Millsburg	1	Orange County	10933	
Mills Corners	1	Fulton County		
Mills Mills	1	Allegany County	14735	
Milltown	1	Putnam County		
Millville	1	Orleans County	14103	
Millwood	1	Westchester County	10546	
Milo	1	Yates County		
Milo Center	1	Yates County	14527	
Milo Mills	1	Yates County	14527	
Milton	1	Saratoga County		
Milton	1	Saratoga County	12547	
Milton	1	Ulster County	12547	
Milton	1	Westchester County	10580	
Milton Center	1	Saratoga County	12020	
Mina	1	Chautauqua County	14781	
Mina	1	Chautauqua County		
Minaville	1	Montgomery County	12010	
Minden	1	Montgomery County		
Mindenville	1	Montgomery County	13339	
Mineola	1	Nassau County	11501	
Mineral Springs	1	Schoharie County	12043	
Minerva	1	Essex County	12851	
Minerva	1	Essex County		
Minetto	1	Oswego County	13115	
Minetto	1	Oswego County		
Mineville	1	Essex County	12956	
Mineville-Witherbee	1	Essex County		
Minisink	1	Orange County		
Minisink Ford	1	Sullivan County	12719	
Minklers Corners	1	St. Lawrence County	13662	
Minnehaha	1	Herkimer County	13472	
Minoa	1	Onondaga County	13116	
Minsteed	1	Wayne County		
Mitchell Field	1	Nassau County	11553	
Mitchellsville	1	Steuben County	14810	
Model City	1	Niagara County	14107	
Modena	1	Ulster County	12548	
Modena Gardens	1	Ulster County	12548	
Moffitsville	1	Clinton County	12981	
Mohawk	1	Herkimer County	13407	
Mohawk	1	Montgomery County		
Mohawk Gardens	1	Oneida County		
Mohawk Hill	1	Lewis County	13309	
Mohawk View	1	Albany County	12110	
Mohegan Heights	1	Westchester County		
Mohegan Lake	1	Westchester County	10547	
Mohican Lake	1	Sullivan County		
Mohonk Lake	1	Ulster County	12561	
Moira	1	Franklin County	12957	
Moira	1	Franklin County		
Molyneaux Corners	1	Niagara County	14094	
Mombaccus	1	Ulster County	12446	
Mongaup	1	Sullivan County	12780	
Mongaup Valley	1	Sullivan County	12762	
Monroe	1	Orange County	10950	
Monroe	1	Orange County		
Monroe Southwest	1	Orange County		
Monsey	1	Rockland County	10952	
Monsey Heights	1	Rockland County	10952	
Montague	1	Lewis County		
Montario Point	1	Jefferson County	13661	
Montauk	1	Suffolk County	11954	
Montauk Air Force Station	1	Suffolk County	11954	
Montauk Beach	1	Suffolk County	11954	
Montauk Estates	1	Suffolk County	11930	
Montauk Station	1	Suffolk County		
Montclair Colony	1	Suffolk County	11964	
Montebello	1	Rockland County	10901	
Monteola	1	Lewis County		
Monterey	1	Schuyler County	14812	
Monterey Estates	1	Rockland County	10989	
Montezuma	1	Cayuga County	13117	
Montezuma	1	Cayuga County		
Montgomery	1	Orange County	12549	
Montgomery	1	Orange County		
Monticello	1	Otsego County		
Monticello	1	Sullivan County	12701	
Montoma	1	Ulster County		
Montour	1	Schuyler County		
Montour Falls	1	Schuyler County	14865	
Montrose	1	Westchester County	10548	
Montville	1	Cayuga County	13118	
Moody	1	Franklin County	12986	
Mooers	1	Clinton County	12958	
Mooers	1	Clinton County		
Mooers Forks	1	Clinton County	12959	
Moon Beach	1	Cayuga County		
Moons	1	Chautauqua County		
Moores Mill	1	Dutchess County	12569	
Moose River	1	Lewis County	13433	
Moravia	1	Cayuga County	13118	
Moravia	1	Cayuga County		
Moreau	1	Saratoga County		
Morehouse	1	Hamilton County		
Morehouseville	1	Hamilton County	13324	
Moreland	1	Schuyler County	14812	
Morey Park	1	Rensselaer County	12123	
Morgan	1	New York County	10118	
Morgan Corners	1	Chautauqua County		
Morgan Hill	1	Ulster County	12401	
Morganville	1	Genesee County	14143	
Moriah	1	Essex County	12960	
Moriah	1	Essex County		
Moriah Center	1	Essex County	12961	
Moriches	1	Suffolk County	11955	
Morley	1	St. Lawrence County	13617	
Morningside	1	New York County	10026	
Morris	1	Otsego County	13808	
Morris	1	Otsego County		
Morrisania	1	Bronx County	10456	
Morris Heights	1	Bronx County	10453	
Morrison Heights	1	Orange County	12549	
Morrisonville	1	Clinton County	12962	
Morris Park	1	Bronx County	10461	
Morris Park	1	Queens County	11419	
Morristown	1	St. Lawrence County	13664	
Morristown	1	St. Lawrence County		
Morristown Center	1	St. Lawrence County		
Morrisville	1	Madison County	13408	
Morrisville Station	1	Madison County	13408	
Morse	1	Oswego County		
Morse Mill	1	Cayuga County		
Morsston	1	Sullivan County	12758	
Mortimer	1	Monroe County		
Morton	2	Monroe County	14508	
Morton	2	Orleans County	14508	
Morton Corners	1	Erie County		
Morton Corners	1	Tompkins County		
Moscow Hill	1	Madison County	13355	
Mosher Corners	1	Tompkins County		
Mosherville	1	Saratoga County	12074	
Moshier Falls	1	Herkimer County		
Mosholu	1	Bronx County	10471	
Mosquito Point	1	Cayuga County		
Mosquito Point	1	Greene County	12468	
Mossyglen	1	Steuben County	14830	
Mott Haven	1	Bronx County	10454	
Mott Haven Junction	1	Bronx County		
Mottville	1	Onondaga County	13119	
Mountain Dale	1	Sullivan County	12763	
Mountain House	1	Orange County		
Mountain Lodge	1	Herkimer County		
Mountain Lodge	1	Orange County	10950	
Mountain View	1	Franklin County	12969	
Mountain View East	1	Rockland County	10989	
Mountainville	1	Orange County	10953	
Mount Airy	1	Westchester County	10520	
Mount Arab	1	St. Lawrence County		
Mount Carmel	1	Bronx County	10458	
Mount Carmel	1	Broome County		
Mount Eve	1	Orange County	10924	
Mount Hope	1	Orange County	10940	
Mount Hope	1	Orange County		
Mount Hope	1	Washington County		
Mount Hope	1	Westchester County	10706	
Mount Ivy	1	Rockland County	10970	
Mount Kisco	1	Westchester County	10549	
Mount Kisco	1	Westchester County		
Mount Loretto	1	Richmond County	10309	
Mount Marion	1	Ulster County	12456	
Mount Marion Park	1	Ulster County	12456	
Mount Merion Park	1	Ulster County	12456	
Mount Morris	1	Livingston County	14510	
Mount Morris	1	Livingston County		
Mount Pleasant	1	Oswego County	13069	
Mount Pleasant	1	Saratoga County		
Mount Pleasant	1	Schenectady County		
Mount Pleasant	1	Ulster County	12457	
Mount Pleasant	1	Westchester County	10591	
Mount Pleasant	1	Westchester County		
Mount Pleasant Cemetery	1	Westchester County		
Mount Prosper	1	Sullivan County	12790	
Mount Read	1	Monroe County		
Mount Riga	1	Dutchess County		
Mount Ross	1	Dutchess County	12567	
Mount St. Vincent	1	Bronx County		
Mount Sinai	1	Suffolk County	11766	
Mount Tremper	1	Ulster County	12457	
Mount Upton	1	Chenango County	13809	
Mount Vernon	1	Erie County	14075	
Mount Vernon	1	Sullivan County		
Mount Vernon	1	Westchester County	10550	10553
Mount Vernon West	1	Westchester County		
Mount Vision	1	Otsego County	13810	
Moyers Corners	1	Onondaga County		
Mud Hill	1	Oswego County		
Mud Lock	1	Seneca County		
Mud Mills	1	Wayne County	14513	
Mud Settlement	1	Oswego County		
Muitzes Kill	1	Rensselaer County	12156	
Mumford	1	Monroe County	14511	
Mundale	1	Delaware County		
Mungers Corners	1	Oswego County	13069	
Municipal Building	1	Kings County	11201	
Munns	1	Madison County		
Munnsville	1	Madison County	13409	
Munsey Park	1	Nassau County	11030	
Munsons Corners	1	Cortland County	13045	
Munsonville	1	Fulton County		
Murdochs Crossing	1	Orleans County	14098	
Murdock Woods	1	Westchester County	10583	
Murray	1	Orleans County	14470	
Murray	1	Orleans County		
Murray Hill	1	Queens County	11354	11358
Murray Hill	1	New York County	10016	
Murray Hill	1	Westchester County		
Murray Isle	1	Jefferson County	13624	
Murrays Corner	1	Erie County		
Muttontown	1	Nassau County	11791	
Mycenae	1	Onondaga County		
Myers	1	Tompkins County	14882	
Myers Corner	1	Dutchess County	12590	
Myers Grove	1	Orange County	12739	
