= Witherbee, New York =

- Census-designated place
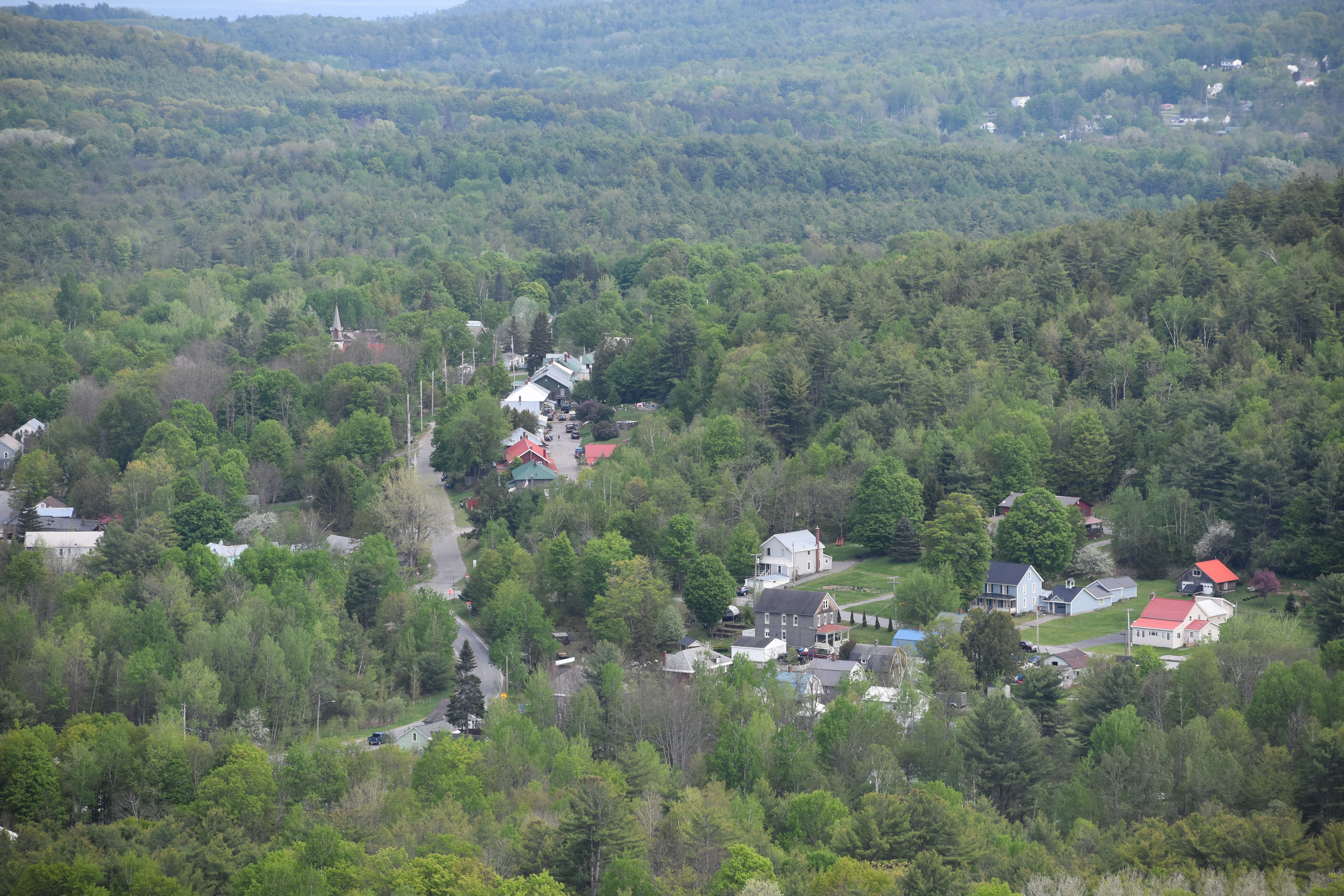
- View of Witherbee from Belfry Mountain

- Location within New York
- Coordinates: 44°5′15″N 73°32′0″W
- Country: United States
- State: New York
- County: Essex
- Town: Moriah

Area
  - Total: 0.98 sq mi (2.54 km^{2})
  - Land: 0.98 sq mi (2.54 km^{2})
  - Water: 0 sq mi (0.00 km^{2})
- Elevation: 1,273 ft (388 m)

Population (2020)
  - Total: 385
  - Density: 393.2/sq mi (151.81/km^{2})
- Time zone: UTC-5 (Eastern (EST))
  - Summer (DST): UTC-4 (EDT)
- ZIP code: 12998
- FIPS code: 36-82656

Witherbee is a hamlet and census-designated place (CDP) in the town of Moriah in Essex County, New York, United States. As of the 2020 census, Witherbee had a population of 385. Prior to 2010 the hamlet was part of the Mineville-Witherbee CDP.

== Geography ==
Witherbee is located in the northern part of the town of Moriah and is bordered to the north by the hamlet of Mineville. It is 5 miles (8 km) northwest of Port Henry, the largest settlement in the town of Moriah.

According to the United States Census Bureau, the Witherbee CDP has a total area of 0.73 square miles (1.90 km^{2}), all land.

== Demographics ==
Historical population
Census	Pop.	Note	%±
2020	385		—
U.S. Decennial Census

== History ==
Newport Pond, a 25 acre pond beside County Road 6 (Tracy Road) west of Witherbee, is namesake of a former royal fish pond in Newport, Essex, England, original manor of the Howland family ancestor John Howland, 1st Lord Newport Pond of Essex, England (1500–1546). The Witherbee Memorial Hall was listed on the National Register of Historic Places in 1991.

== Education ==
The census-designated place is in the Moriah Central School District.

== Notable person ==
- Former Major League Baseball pitcher Johnny Podres was born in Witherbee. A monument to him is near the town on Highway 9N, visible as one drives north.
