= Mineville-Witherbee, New York =

Mineville-Witherbee
- Former CDP
- Location in Essex County and the state of New York.
- Coordinates: 44°05′13″N 073°31′28″W
- Country: United States
- State: New York
- County: Essex

Area
  - Total: 4.45 sq mi (11.53 km^{2})
  - Land: 4.44 sq mi (11.50 km^{2})
  - Water: 0.012 sq mi (0.03 km^{2})

Population (2000)
  - Total: 1,747
  - Density: 393.5/sq mi (151.9/km^{2})
- Time zone: UTC-5 (Eastern (EST))
  - Summer (DST): UTC-4 (EDT)
- FIPS code: 36-47707

Mineville-Witherbee was a census-designated place in the town of Moriah in Essex County, New York, United States. The population was 1,747 at the 2000 census. For the 2010 census, the area was split into two separate CDPs comprising the hamlets of Mineville (pop. 1,269) and Witherbee (pop. 347). They are located in the northern part of Moriah, northwest of Port Henry. Mineville was named for the iron ore mines that used to operate here.

== History ==
The Witherbee Memorial Hall was listed on the National Register of Historic Places in 1991.

== Geography ==
Mineville-Witherbee is located at 44°5′13″N 73°31′28″W (44.086842, -73.524480).

According to the United States Census Bureau, the CDP had a total area of 4.45 square miles (11.53 km^{2}), of which 4.44 square miles (11.50 km^{2}) was land and 0.01 square miles (0.03 km^{2}), or 0.22%, was water.

The CDP was located mostly between County Roads 7 and 70 at the junction of County Road 6.

== Demographics ==
As of the census of 2000, there were 1,747 people, 609 households, and 403 families residing in the CDP. The population density was 393.1 inhabitants per square mile (151.8/km^{2}). There were 680 housing units at an average density of 153.0 per square mile (59.1/km^{2}). The racial makeup of the CDP was 89.64% White, 7.21% African American, 0.23% Native American, 0.11% Asian, 0.06% Pacific Islander, 2.52% from other races, and 0.23% from two or more races. Hispanic or Latino of any race were 6.98% of the population.

There were 609 households, out of which 26.6% had children under the age of 18 living with them, 48.3% were married couples living together, 11.7% had a female householder with no husband present, and 33.8% were non-families. 28.6% of all households were made up of individuals, and 15.3% had someone living alone who was 65 years of age or older. The average household size was 2.38 and the average family size was 2.87.

In the CDP, the population was spread out, with 18.8% under the age of 18, 13.3% from 18 to 24, 32.4% from 25 to 44, 20.5% from 45 to 64, and 14.9% who were 65 years of age or older. The median age was 35 years. For every 100 females, there were 136.4 males. For every 100 females age 18 and over, there were 149.6 males.

The median income for a household in the CDP was $36,579, and the median income for a family was $43,011. Males had a median income of $28,594 versus $21,250 for females. The per capita income for the CDP was $24,440. About 6.7% of families and 10.4% of the population were below the poverty line, including 13.2% of those under age 18 and 12.6% of those age 65 or over.

== Notable residents ==
- Former Major League Baseball pitcher Johnny Podres was born in Witherbee.
- Raymond R. Wright, awarded the Congressional Medal of Honor for meritorious service during the Vietnam War.
