= Sherman Free Library =

- U.S. National Register of Historic Places
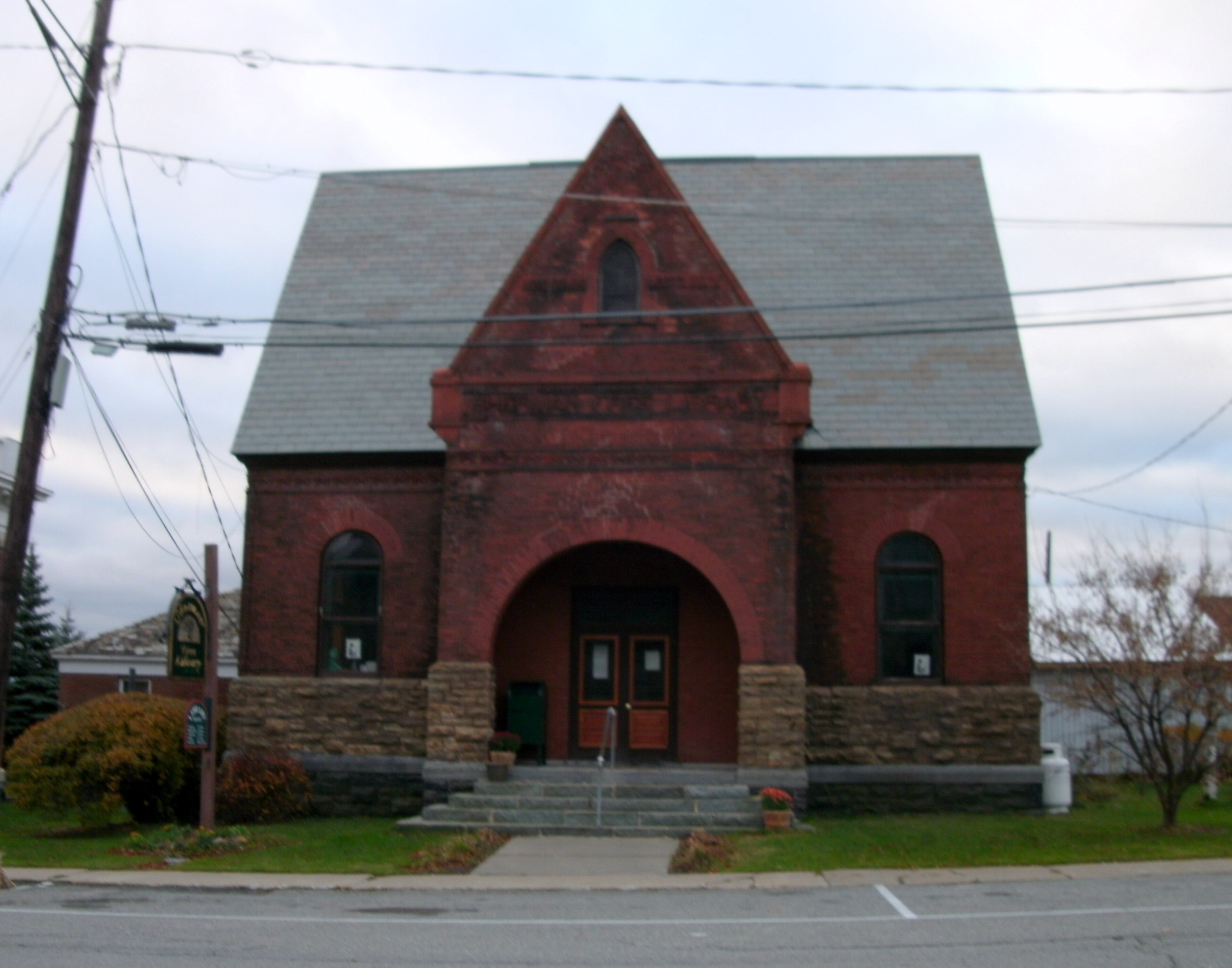
- Sherman Free Library, November 2010

- Location within New York Location within the United States
- Interactive map showing the location for Sherman Free Library
- Location: 20 Church St., Town of Moriah, Port Henry, New York
- Coordinates: 44°2′51″N 73°27′38″W
- Area: less than one acre
- Built: 1887
- Architect: Slocum, S. Gifford; Case Brothers
- Architectural style: Romanesque
- MPS: Moriah MPS
- NRHP reference No.: 95000595
- Added to NRHP: June 1, 1995

Sherman Free Library is an historic free association library, located in the hamlet of Port Henry, in the town of Moriah, in Essex County, New York. It was built in 1887 and has two rooms, and is a 1 1/2-story brick building topped by slate-covered, steeply pitched gable roofs, on a limestone foundation. An addition was built in 1907. It features deeply arched fenestration in the Richardsonian Romanesque style.

It was listed on the National Register of Historic Places in 1995.
