= Belfry Mountain =

Mountain in the Adirondack Mountains region of New York

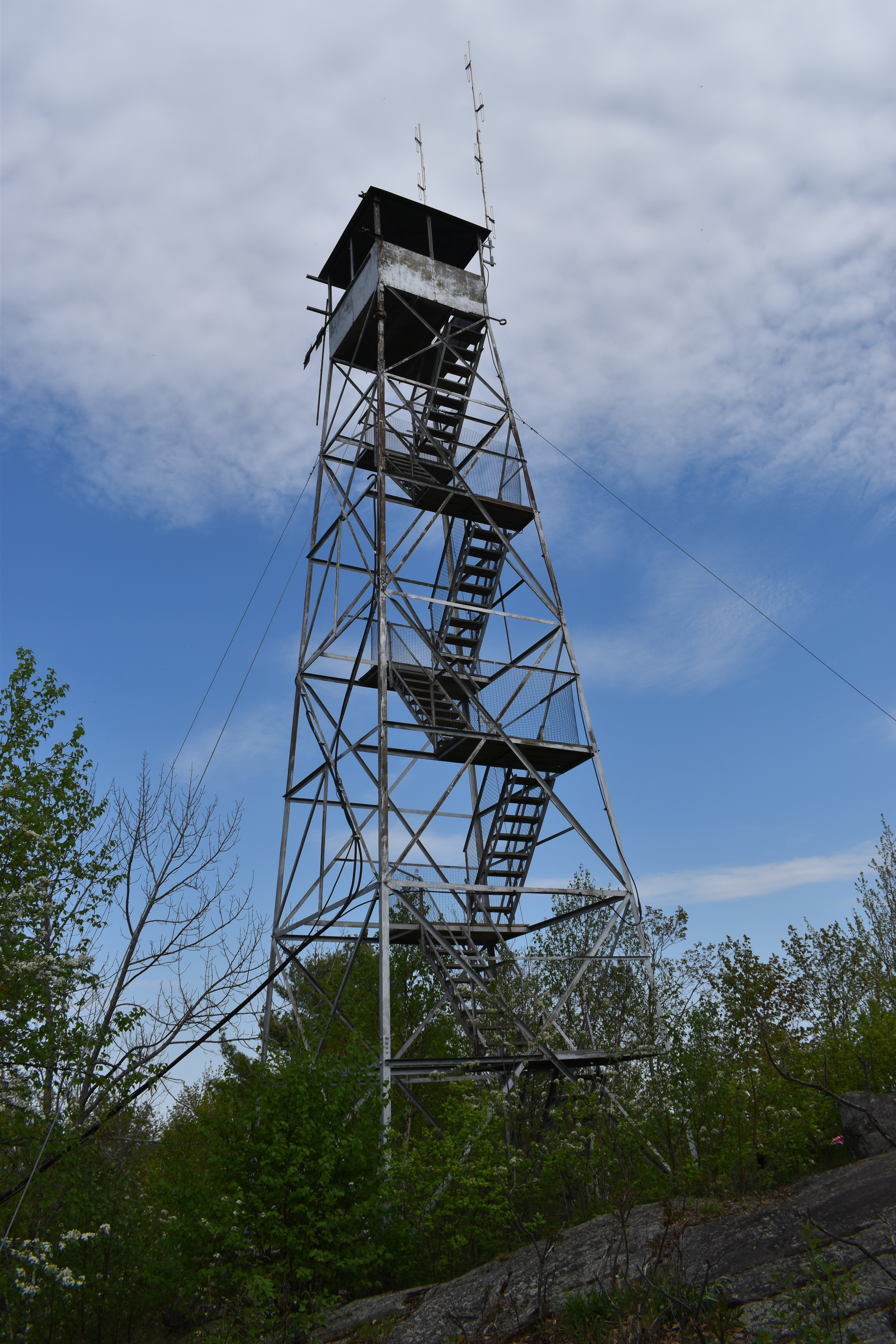
- Belfry Mountain Fire Observation Station on May 19, 2021

Highest point
- Elevation: 1,841 feet (561 m)
- Coordinates: 44°05′52″N 73°32′51″W

Geography
- Location within New York Adirondack Park Location within the United States
- Location: Essex County, New York, U.S.
- Topo map: USGS Witherbee

Belfry Mountain is a mountain in the Adirondack Mountains region of New York. It is located north-northwest of Witherbee in Essex County. The Belfry Mountain Fire Observation Station is located on top of the mountain.

== History ==
The first structure built on the mountain was a wooden tower that was constructed by the Conservation Commission in 1912. In 1917, the Commission replaced it with a 47-foot-tall (14 m) Aermotor LS40 tower. The tower was taken out of service in 1988. The tower was officially closed in early 1989 by the Department of Environmental Conservation.
