= Moriah Town Office Building =

- U.S. National Register of Historic Places
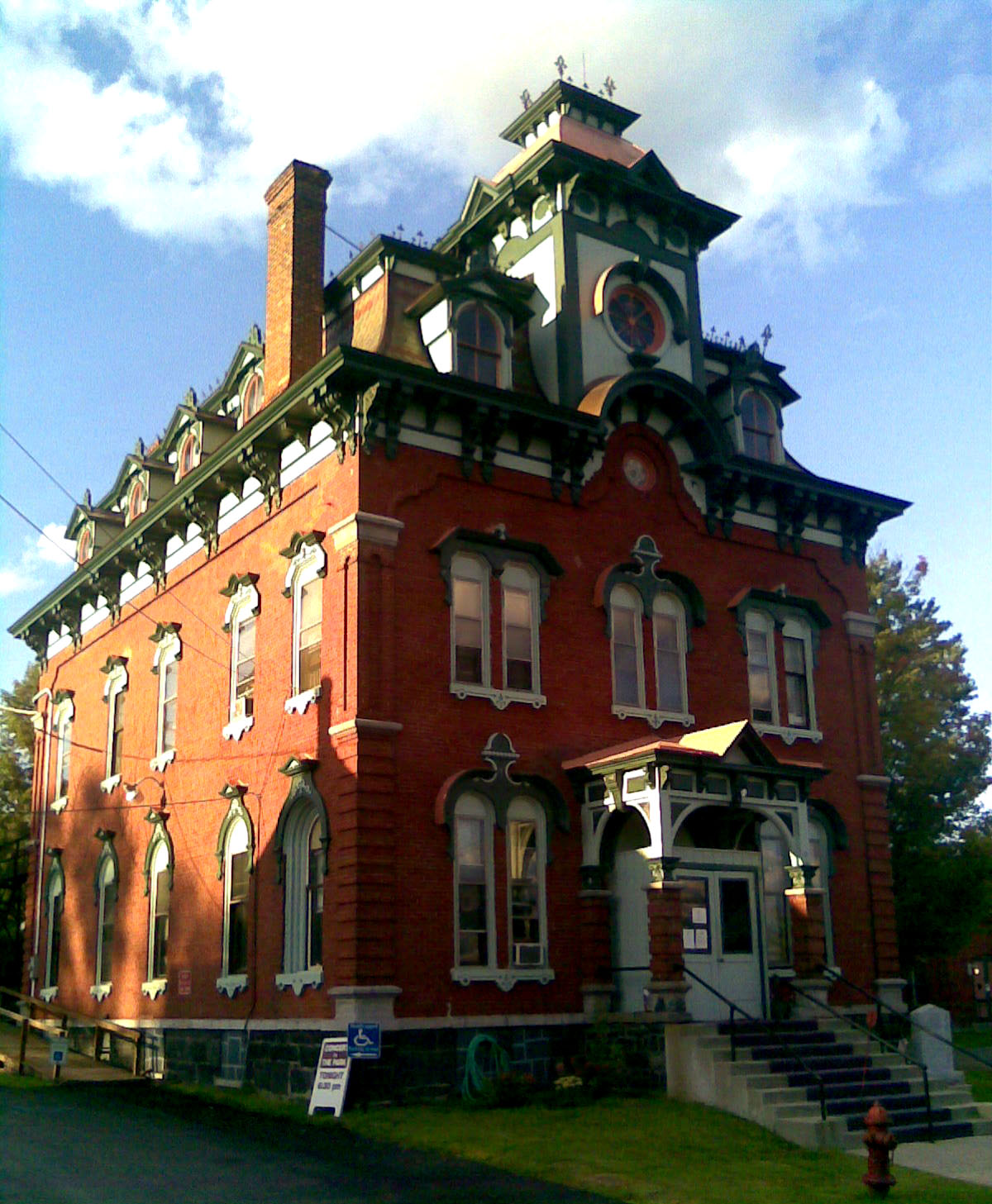

- Location within New York Location within the United States
- Location: Cedar St., Town of Moriah, Port Henry, New York
- Coordinates: 44°2′56″N 73°27′44″W
- Area: 3 acres (1.2 ha)
- Built: 1875
- Architectural style: Second Empire
- MPS: Moriah MPS
- NRHP reference No.: 95000594
- Added to NRHP: May 18, 1995

Moriah Town Office Building is a historic town hall building, located at Port Henry in Essex County, New York, built in 1875. It is a massive, 3-story rectangular, five-by-three-bay, brick building capped by a concave mansard roof in the Second Empire style. It features three tall brick chimneys with molded caps, symmetrically placed gable dormers, and a square roof-top cupola. Also on the property are a carriage house and modest clapboard-sided building, used as a court house. It was built as the main office of Witherbee, Sherman, and Company (later Republic Steel) and obtained for use as town offices in May 1959.

It was listed on the National Register of Historic Places in 1995.
