= Port Henry Fire Department Building =

- U.S. National Register of Historic Places
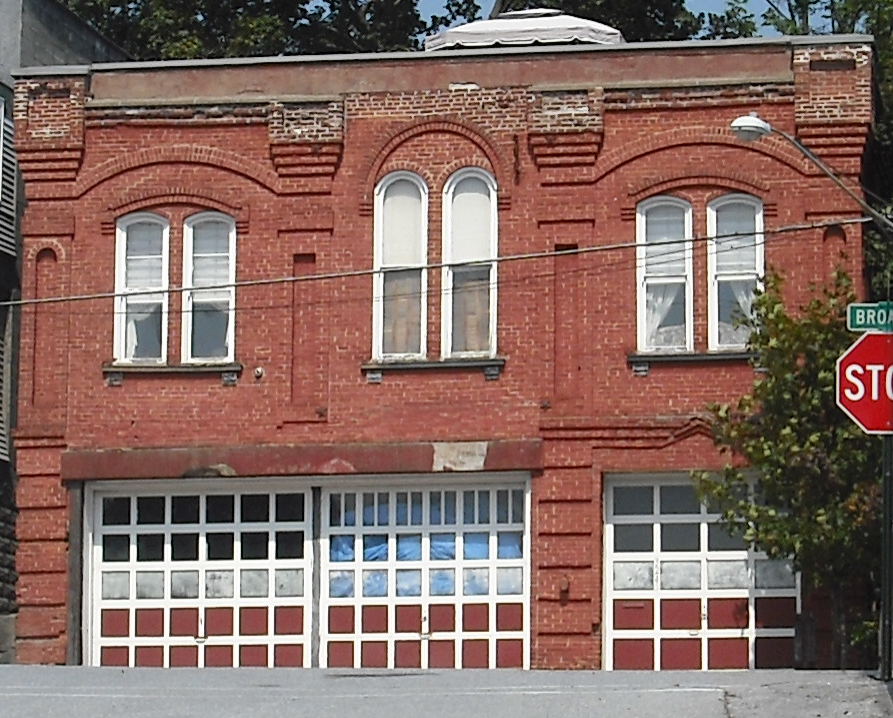

- Location within New York Location within the United States
- Location: 33 Broad Street, Town of Moriah, Port Henry, New York
- Coordinates: 44°2′56″N 73°27′44″W
- Area: less than one acre
- Built: 1883
- Architectural style: Romanesque
- MPS: Moriah MPS
- NRHP reference No.: 95000590
- Added to NRHP: June 1, 1995

The Port Henry Fire Department Building is a historic fire station located at Port Henry in Essex County, New York. It was built in 1883 and is a two-story square, 38 by 38 feet (12 by 12 m), brick building with a flat roof sheathed in asphalt. It features round arches, recessed panels, and decorative corbelling in the Romanesque style. It ceased being used as a fire station in 1970.

It was listed on the National Register of Historic Places in 1995.
