= Van Ornam & Murdock Block =

Historic commercial building in New York, United States

- U.S. National Register of Historic Places
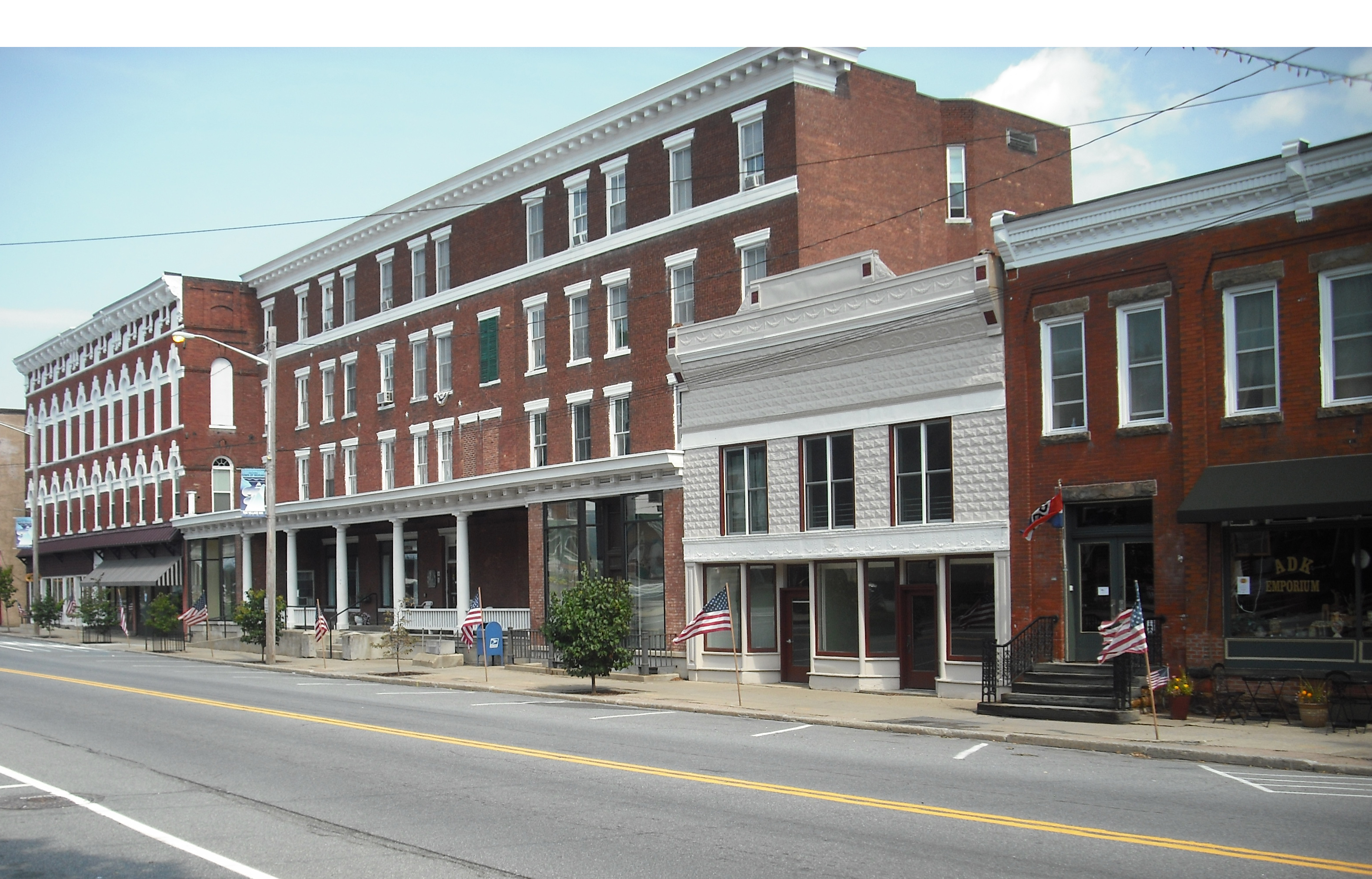

- Location within New York Location within the United States
- Location: Main St., Port Henry, New York
- Coordinates: 44°2′54″N 73°27′36″W
- Area: 1 acre (0.40 ha)
- Built: 1874-1880
- Architectural style: Italianate
- NRHP reference No.: 82001172
- Added to NRHP: November 14, 1982

Van Ornam & Murdock Block, also known as Lee House Block, is a historic commercial block located at Port Henry in Essex County, New York. The block consists of four attached structures in the Italianate style built between 1874 and about 1880. It is the focal point of the Port Henry business district. The Van Ornam Block was built in 1874 and is a 3 1/2-story brick building with an ornately bracketed wood cornice. The 4-story Lee House Hotel was also built in 1874 and is a 4-story brick structure. The next building was built about 1880 and is a 2-story wood-frame building with a stamped metal facade. The Harlan building is last on the block and it was also built about 1880. It is a 2-story, flat-roofed brick structure.

It was listed on the National Register of Historic Places in 1982.
