= Mount Moriah Presbyterian Church =

Historic church in New York, United States

- U.S. National Register of Historic Places
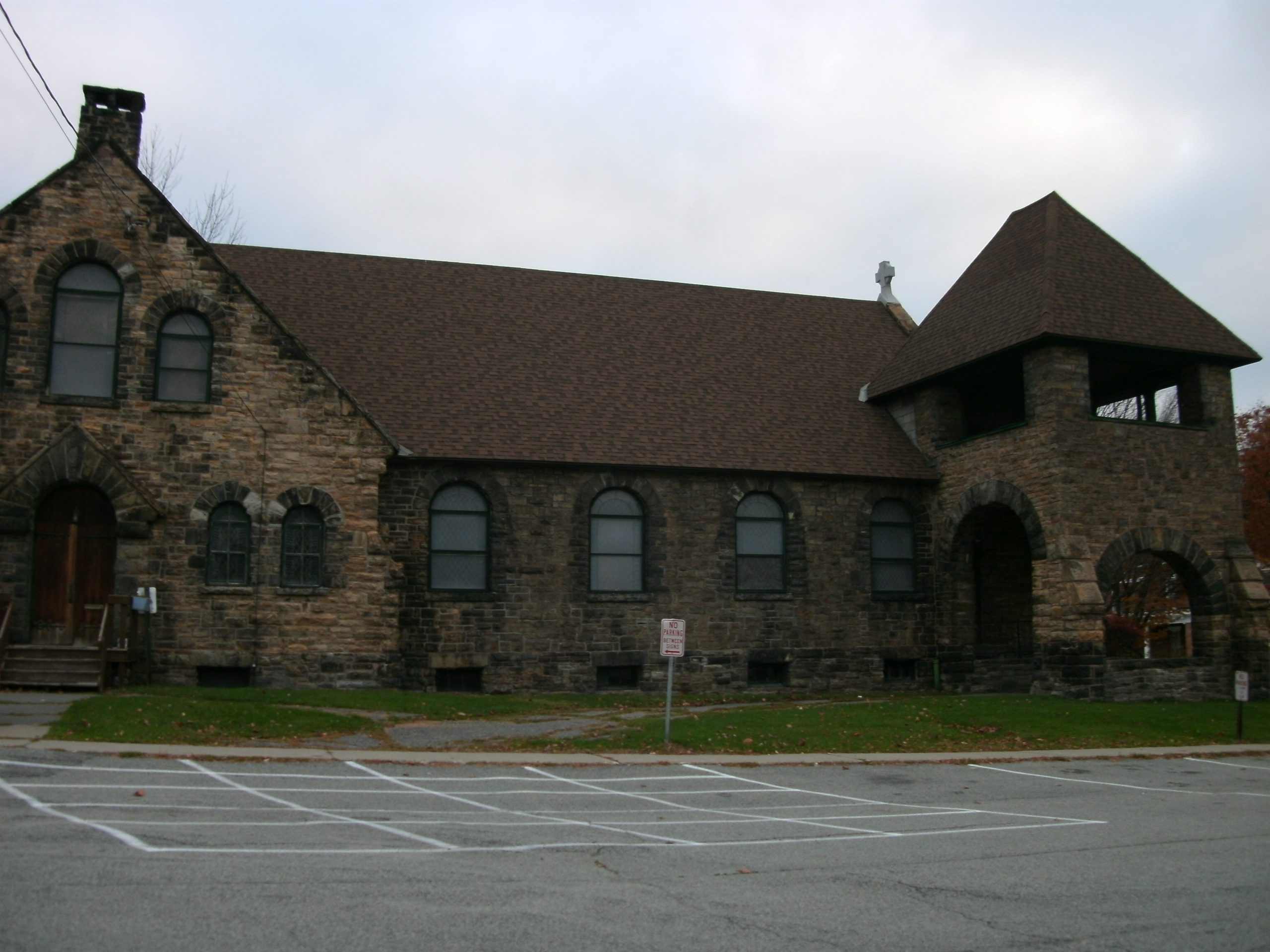

- Location within New York Location within the United States
- Location: Jct. of Church and S. Main Sts., NW corner, Town of Moriah, Port Henry, New York
- Coordinates: 44°2′53″N 73°27′39″W
- Area: less than one acre
- Built: 1888
- Architect: Merry, F. Charles; Smith & Allen Contractors
- Architectural style: Romanesque
- MPS: Moriah MPS
- NRHP reference No.: 95000592
- Added to NRHP: June 1, 1995

Mount Moriah Presbyterian Church, also known as First Presbyterian Church, is a historic Presbyterian church located at Church and S. Main Sts., NW corner, Town of Moriah in Port Henry, Essex County, New York. It was built in 1888 and is a distinguished example of Richardsonian Romanesque architecture. It is rectangular in plan and constructed of dark sandstone. It features an unusual two story, hipped roof, combination porte cochere and bell tower. It was listed on the National Register of Historic Places in 1995.
