= Mapleton, New York =

Hamlet in New York, United States

Coordinates: 43°07′23″N 78°47′57″W

Mapleton is a hamlet in the town of Pendleton in Niagara County, New York, United States.

Mapleton first appeared on maps in 1860 as Mapletown, but the name had been in use since at least the 1840s. A post office operated between 1850 and 1862 and again from 1889 until 1901, when Rural Free Delivery put it out of business. The Mapleton Presbyterian Church opened in 1847. That year, the Buffalo & Lockport Railroad was completed and a train station was established in Mapleton, and the community's nucleus shifted to the station. A fire nearly destroyed the hamlet on May 28, 1925, when Burt N. Thompson's barn became engulfed in flames.

The HBO series The Leftovers takes place in a town called Mapleton, New York, though it is filmed in Westchester County and is described as a suburb of New York City.
