= Witherbee Memorial Hall =

- U.S. National Register of Historic Places
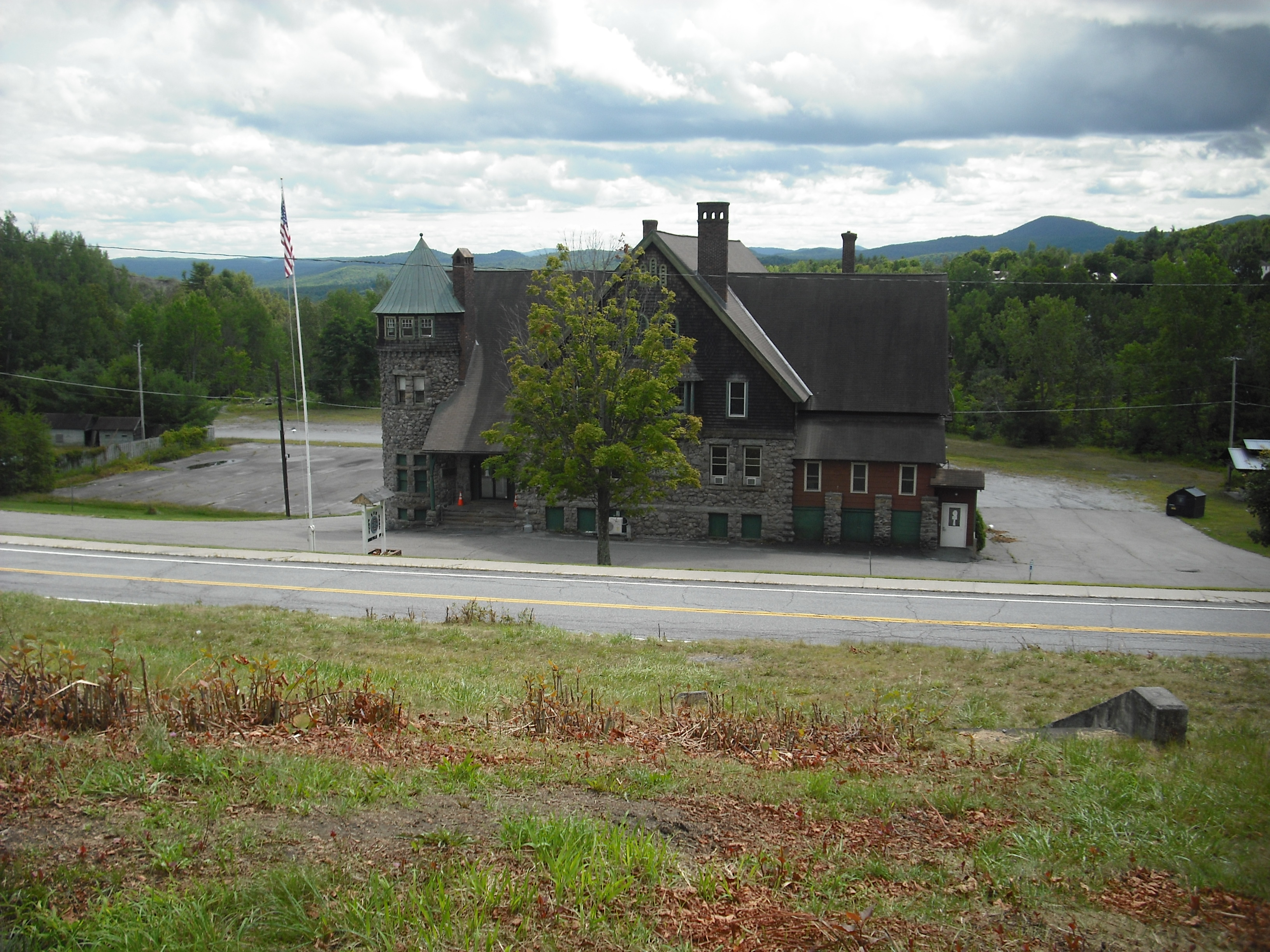
- Memorial Hall from across the street

- Location within New York Location within the United States
- Location: Raymond Wright Rd. E of jct. with Office Rd., Mineville, New York
- Coordinates: 44°5′17″N 73°31′41″W
- Area: 3 acres (1.2 ha)
- Architectural style: Shingle Style
- NRHP reference No.: 91000421
- Added to NRHP: April 22, 1991

Witherbee Memorial Hall is a historic workingmen's club building located at Mineville in Essex County, New York. It was built in 1893 by the Witherbee, Sherman & Co. mining company. It is a massive Shingle Style structure. It is a T-shaped wood-frame structure with a long, rectangular, gable fronted main block. The front elevation features a prominent, recessed second story balcony highlighted by paired Doric order columns. It is now owned and operated by Mineville VFW Post 5802. It also houses a six lane bowling center.

It was listed on the National Register of Historic Places in 1991.

== Gallery ==
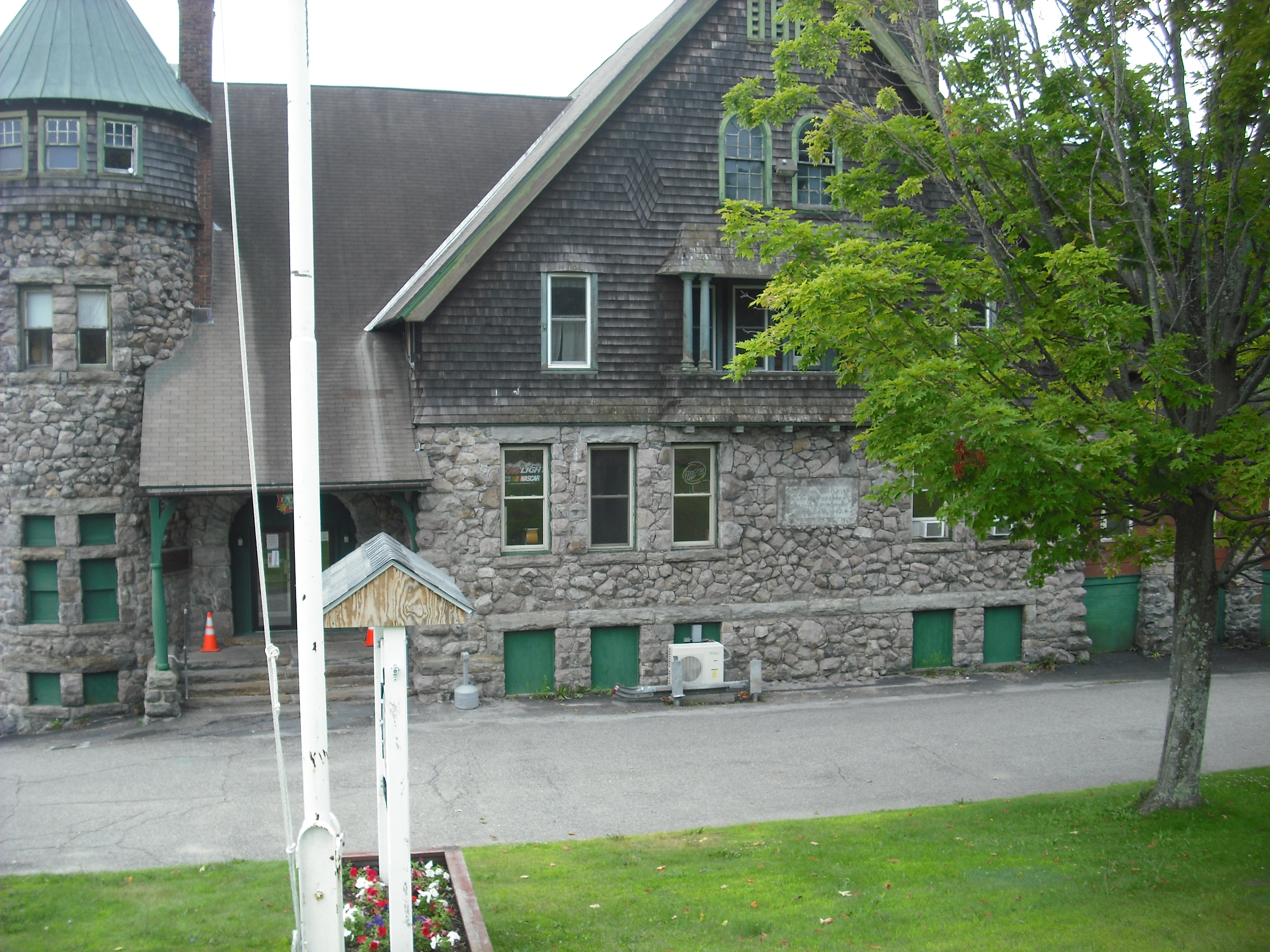
Close up view of Memorial Hall

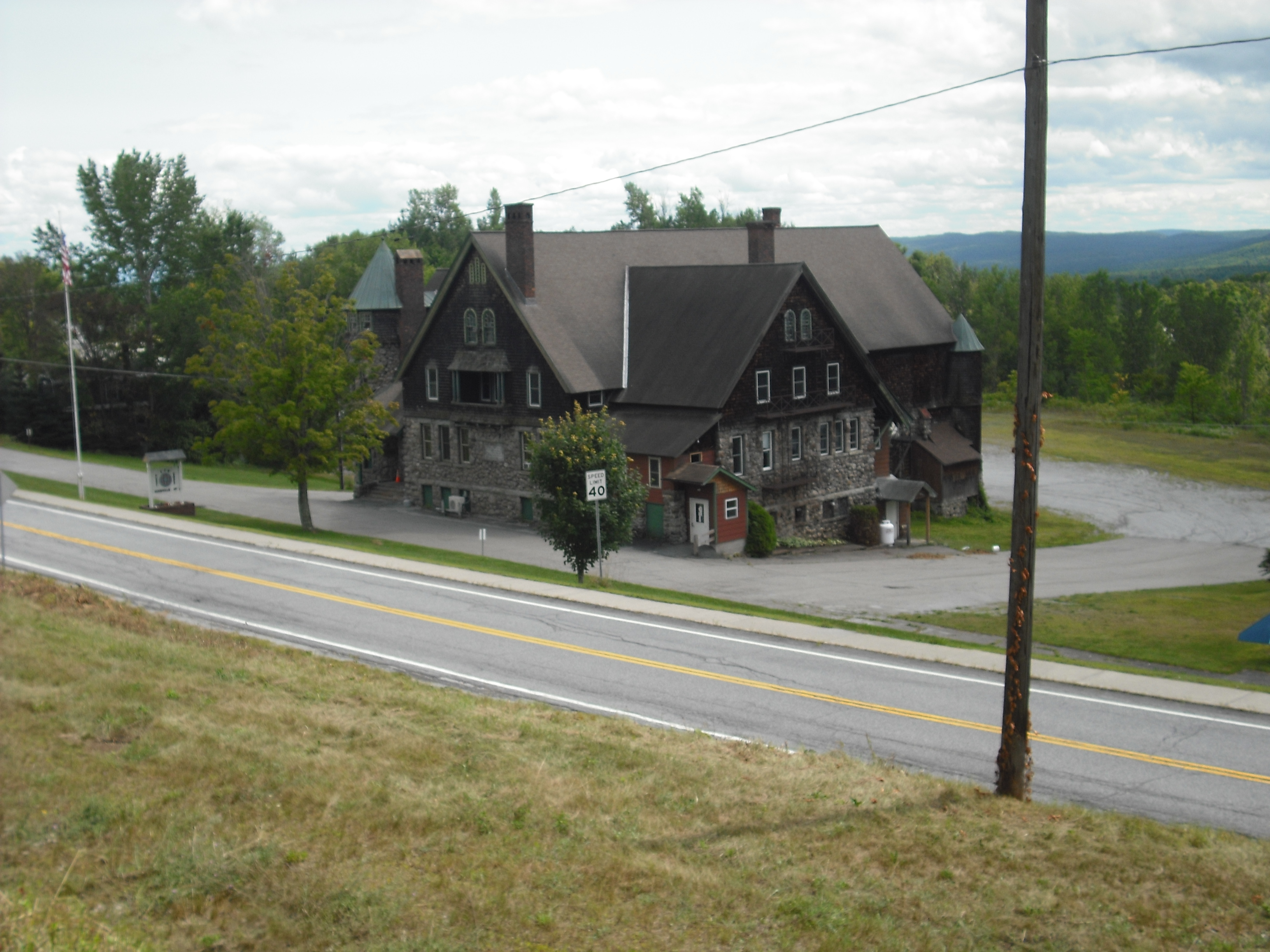
Memorial Hall from the side
