= Mineville, New York =

- Census-designated place
- Location in Essex County and the state of New York
- Coordinates: 44°05′35″N 73°31′6″W
- Country: United States
- State: New York
- County: Essex
- Town: Moriah

Area
  - Total: 3.72 sq mi (9.63 km^{2})
  - Land: 3.70 sq mi (9.59 km^{2})
  - Water: 0.015 sq mi (0.04 km^{2})
- Elevation: 1,306 ft (398 m)

Population (2020)
  - Total: 1,327
  - Density: 358/sq mi (138.4/km^{2})
- Time zone: UTC-5 (Eastern (EST))
  - Summer (DST): UTC-4 (EDT)
- ZIP Codes: 12956 (Mineville); 12998 (Witherbee)
- FIPS code: 36-47707

Mineville is a hamlet and census-designated place (CDP) in the town of Moriah in Essex County, New York. As of the 2020 census, Mineville had a population of 1,327. Prior to the 2010 census, it was part of the Mineville-Witherbee, New York census-designated place. Mineville and Witherbee are located in the northern part of Moriah, northwest of Port Henry. Mineville was named for the iron ore mines that used to operate here.

In 1875, Mineville contributed 8.8% of the iron ore mined in the US.

== Geography ==
Mineville is located at 44°5′35″N 73°31′6″W. According to the U.S. Census Bureau, the CDP has a total area of 3.7 square miles (9.6 km^{2}), of which 0.01 square miles (0.02 km^{2}), or 0.17%, is water. The CDP is located along County Road 7 at the junction of County Road 6, 5 miles (8 km) northwest of Port Henry.

== Demographics ==
Historical population
Census	Pop.	Note	%±
2020	1,327		—
U.S. Decennial Census

== Education ==
The census-designated place is in the Moriah Central School District.
