= Morton Corners, New York =

- hamlet
- Location in New York Morton Corners (the United States)
- Coordinates: 42°30′40″N 78°45′54″W
- Country: United States
- State: New York
- County: Erie
- Town: Concord
- Elevation: 1,380 ft (420 m)
- Time zone: UTC-5 (Eastern (EST))
  - Summer (DST): UTC-4 (EDT)
- ZIP code: 14141
- Area code: 716
- GNIS feature ID: 957718

Morton Corners, also known as Morton's Corners, is a small hamlet in the town of Concord in southern Erie County, New York, United States.
