= Moriah Central School District =

School district in the U.S. state of New York

Moriah Central School

Location
- Moriah, New York United States

District information
- Motto: Home of the Vikings
- Grades: K-12
- Superintendent: William Larrow
- Schools: 2

Students and staff
- District mascot: Vikings
- Colors: Red and white

Other information
- Website: moriahk12.org

Moriah Central School District is a school district in Port Henry, New York, United States. The superintendent is William Larrow. The district operates two schools, Moriah Central School and CVES Mineville.

== Administration ==
The district offices are located at 39 Viking Lane in Port Henry. The current superintendent is William Larrow.

=== Selected former superintendents ===
Previous assignment and reason for departure denoted in parentheses

- Milton J. Tesar 1977-1980 (principal - Moriah Central School, named principal of Waterloo High School)
- Larry Northup
- Harold P. Bresett ?-2006

== Moriah Junior/Senior High School ==
Moriah Junior/Senior High School

Information
- Principal: Alison Burch
- Teaching staff: 42
- Grades: 7-12
- Website: Moriah Junior/Senior High

Moriah Junior/Senior High School is located at 39 Viking Lane and serves grades 7 through 12. The current interim principal is Alison Burch.

=== History ===
Moriah Central School was built in 1966 and classes would officially start in the winter of 1967, following the closure of the Port Henry School.

While he never actually attended Moriah Central School, a showcase is dedicated to famous baseball player Johnny Podres, who attended Port Henry School.

=== Selected former principals ===
Previous assignment and reason for departure denoted in parentheses

- Milton Tesar 1975-1978 (assistant principal - Cambridge Central School, named superintendent of Moriah Central School)
- Michael DeWeese 1980s
- Alonzo "Jack" Roberts 1990s
- James M. Rovito 1998-2000
- David Blades 2000-2002
- Frank Devine 2002-2003
- Cathy Carr 2004–2010

== Moriah Elementary School ==
Moriah Elementary School

Information
- Type: Public, coeducational
- Principal: Carrie Langey
- Teaching staff: 89
- Grades: PreK-6
- Website: Moriah Elementary School

Moriah Elementary School is located at 39 Viking Lane and serves grades PK through 6. The current principal is Carrie Langey.

== CVES Mineville ==
CV-TEC Mineville

Location
- 3092 Plank Road Mineville NY, 12956

Information
- Sister school: Moriah Central School
- Principal: Tina Mitchell
- Grades: 11-12

RISE Center for Success

Location
- 3092 Plank Road Mineville NY 12956

Information
- Other name: Yandon Dillon Center
- Grades: K-12

CVES Mineville is a school in Mineville that hosts a BOCES known as "CV-TEC", and Rise Center for Success, an educational program geared towards children with physical, emotional, or learning difficulties. Both programs are part of a larger network known as Champlain Valley Educational Services.
