= Moriah Center, New York =

- Hamlet
- Location within New York Location within the United States
- Coordinates: 44°03′40″N 73°30′35″W
- Country: United States
- State: New York
- County: Essex
- Elevation: 791 ft (241 m)
- Time zone: UTC-5 (Eastern (EST))
  - Summer (DST): UTC-4 (EDT)
- ZIP code: 12961
- Area codes: 518 & 838
- GNIS feature ID: 957674

Moriah Center is a hamlet in Essex County, New York, United States. The community is 2.6 miles (4.2 km) west-northwest of Port Henry. Moriah Center has a post office with ZIP code 12961.
