= Moriah, New York =

- Town
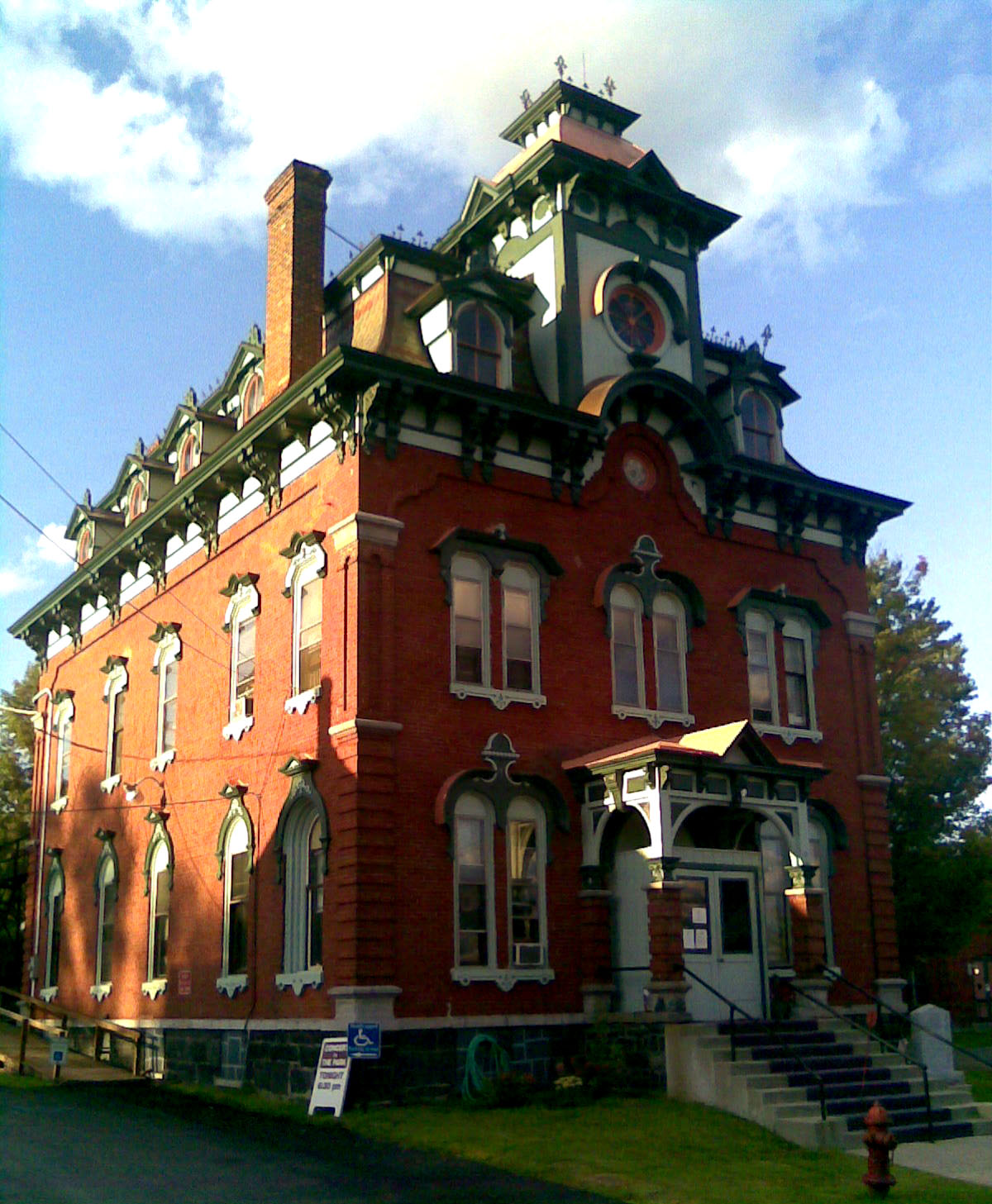
- Moriah Town Hall in Port Henry

- Location in Essex County and the state of New York
- Coordinates: 44°3′26″N 73°29′26″W
- Country: United States
- State: New York
- County: Essex

Government
  - Type: Town council
  - Town supervisor: Matthew Brassard (R)
  - Town council: Members' list: • Thomas Anderson (R); • Nathan Gilbo (R); • Paul Salerno (R); • James Curran (R)

Area
  - Total: 71.11 sq mi (184.17 km^{2})
  - Land: 64.49 sq mi (167.03 km^{2})
  - Water: 6.62 sq mi (17.14 km^{2})
- Elevation: 991 ft (302 m)

Population (2020)
  - Total: 4,716
  - Density: 66.3/sq mi (25.61/km^{2})
- Time zone: UTC-5 (Eastern (EST))
  - Summer (DST): UTC-4 (EDT)
- ZIP Codes: 12960 (Moriah); 12961 (Moriah Center); 12956 (Mineville); 12974 (Port Henry); 12998 (Witherbee); 12993 (Westport)
- Area code: 518
- FIPS code: 36-031-48428
- GNIS feature ID: 0979238
- Website: townofmoriahny.gov

Moriah is a town in Essex County, New York, United States. Lying within the Adirondack Park, it is situated in the eastern part of the county, 47 miles (76 km) by road south-southwest of Burlington, Vermont, 55 miles (89 km) south of Plattsburgh, 115 miles (185 km) north of Albany, and 116 miles (187 km) south of Montreal, Quebec. The population was 4,798 at the 2010 census.

== History ==
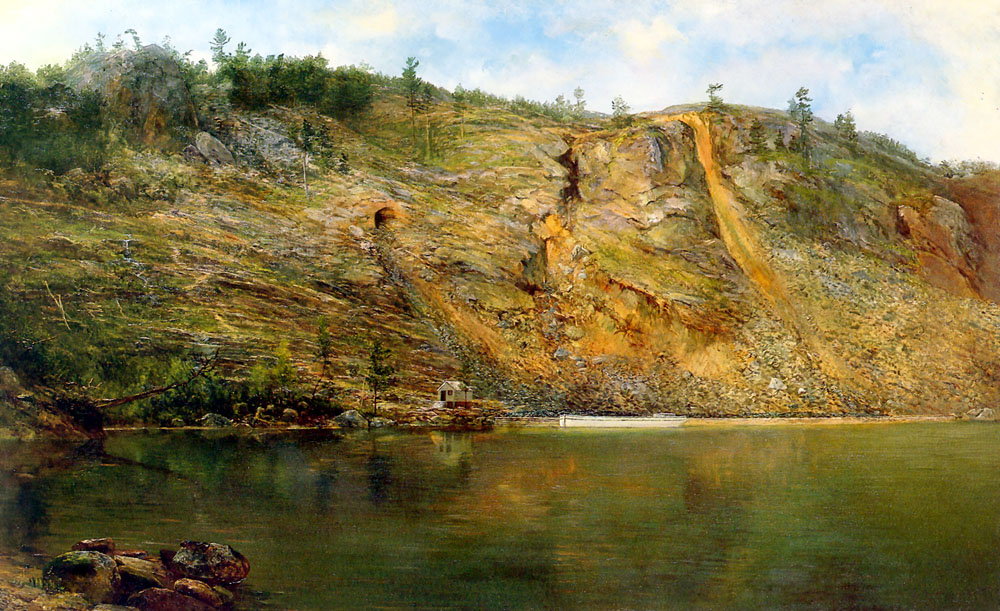
The Iron Mine, Port Henry, New York, c. 1862, painted by Homer Dodge Martin

This area was inhabited for thousands of years by varying cultures of indigenous peoples. At the time of European encounter, the area was inhabited chiefly by the historic Iroquoian-speaking Mohawk of the Iroquois Confederacy to the west of Lake Champlain, with the Algonquian-speaking Mahican people to the south.

In 1749, French Jesuits attracted numerous Iroquois (mostly Onondaga fleeing warfare in the western part of present-day New York) to a site on the Oswegatchie River near present-day Ogdensburg. The Jesuit priests founded a mission village and fort. The Iroquois were required to convert to Catholicism to live there. The converted Iroquois and their descendants became known as the "Oswegatchie", and were considered "nephews" to the Six Nations of the Iroquois. They were among the Seven Nations of Canada that allied with the French during the Seven Years' War (known as the French and Indian War on the North American front) and with the British during the American Revolutionary War, in part due to their strong trading ties and cultural links. After the Seven Years' War (French and Indian War) and British victory, the colonial government granted some of its soldiers land in the region, which was ceded to Britain by the French.

It was not until 1785, after the American Revolutionary War, when most of the Iroquois allies went to Upper Canada with the Loyalists, that the first European-American permanent settlement was made here. At the time, local Native Americans still hunted in the area. They were called the St. Regis and Oswegatchie Indians, although both groups were Catholic Iroquois, primarily Mohawk and Onondaga. Relations were initially friendly, but American settlement patterns pushed the Native Americans from their hunting grounds. (The St. Regis group were Catholic Mohawk who lived at the reserve of Akwesasne, whose territory along the St. Lawrence River included land within the boundaries of both Canada and New York. Today it is recognized in the United States as the St. Regis Mohawk Reservation and in Canada as Akwesasne.)

The Town of Moriah was formed in 1808 from the town of Elizabethtown.

The discovery and mining of iron in the Adirondacks caused a boom in the local economy. This area also processed iron in smelting, and shipped products from Port Henry on Lake Champlain. These operations were conducted from 1824 until 1971. The Iron Center Museum in Port Henry recalls and interprets that past era.

Winter ice-fishing for smelt on the frozen Lake Champlain has been a popular sport for more than a century. Tourists come to join residents in this activity.

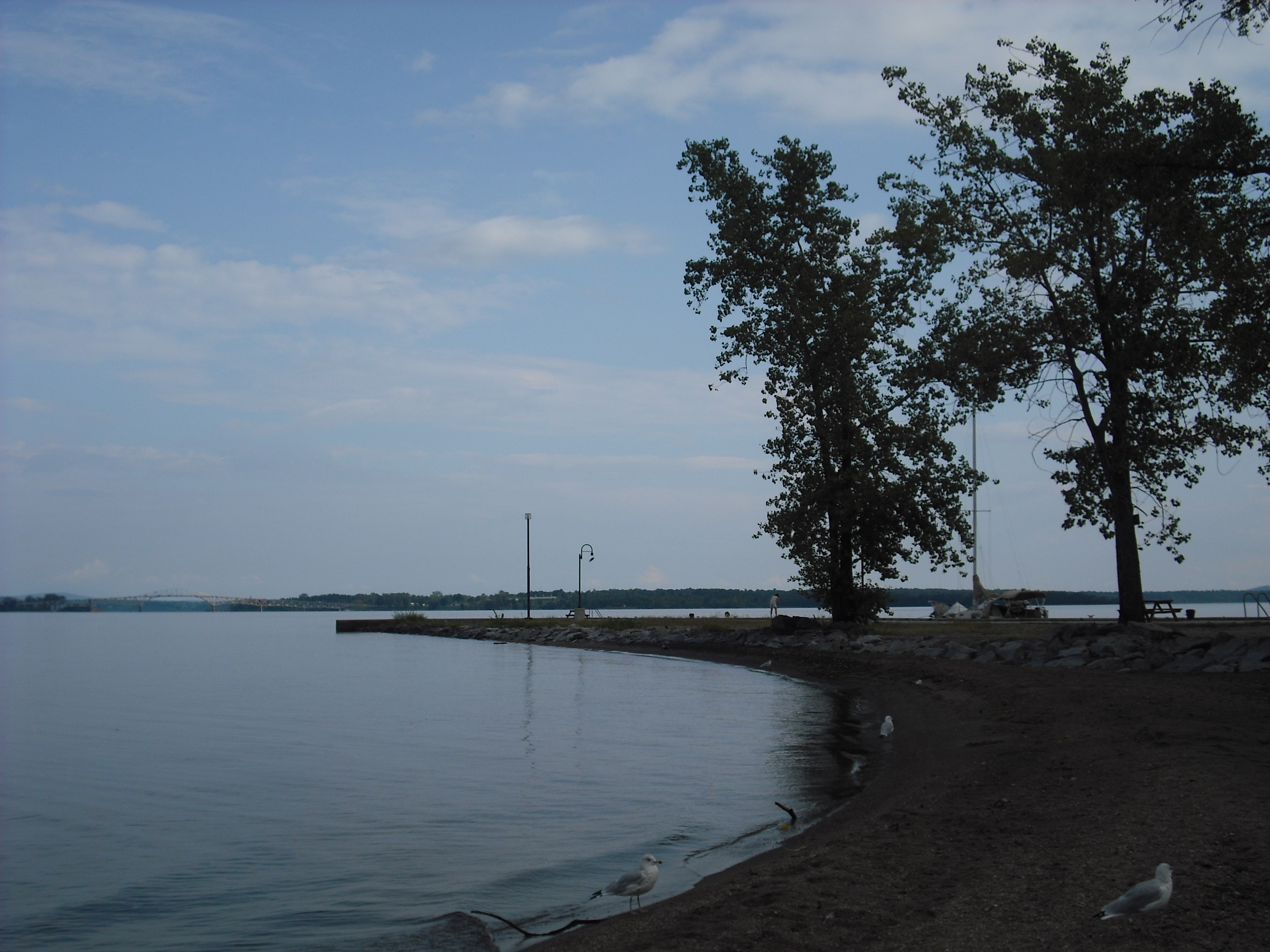
Port Henry Pier

== Geography ==
According to the United States Census Bureau, the town has a total area of 71.1 square miles (184.2 km^{2}), of which 64.5 square miles (167.0 km^{2}) is land and 6.6 square miles (17.1 km^{2}), or 9.31%, is water.

The eastern town line is formed by Lake Champlain and the border of Vermont.

New York State Route 9N is a north-south highway near Lake Champlain. Interstate 87, the Northway, crosses the northwestern corner of Moriah.

== Demographics ==
Historical population
Census	Pop.	Note	%±
1820	842		—
1830	1,742		106.9%
1840	2,595		49.0%
1850	3,065		18.1%
1860	3,466		13.1%
1870	4,683		35.1%
1880	7,379		57.6%
1890	6,787		−8.0%
1900	4,447		−34.5%
1910	6,754		51.9%
1920	6,626		−1.9%
1930	6,191		−6.6%
1940	5,952		−3.9%
1950	5,796		−2.6%
1960	5,837		0.7%
1970	5,244		−10.2%
1980	5,139		−2.0%
1990	4,884		−5.0%
2000	4,879		−0.1%
2010	4,798		−1.7%
2020	4,716		−1.7%
U.S. Decennial Census

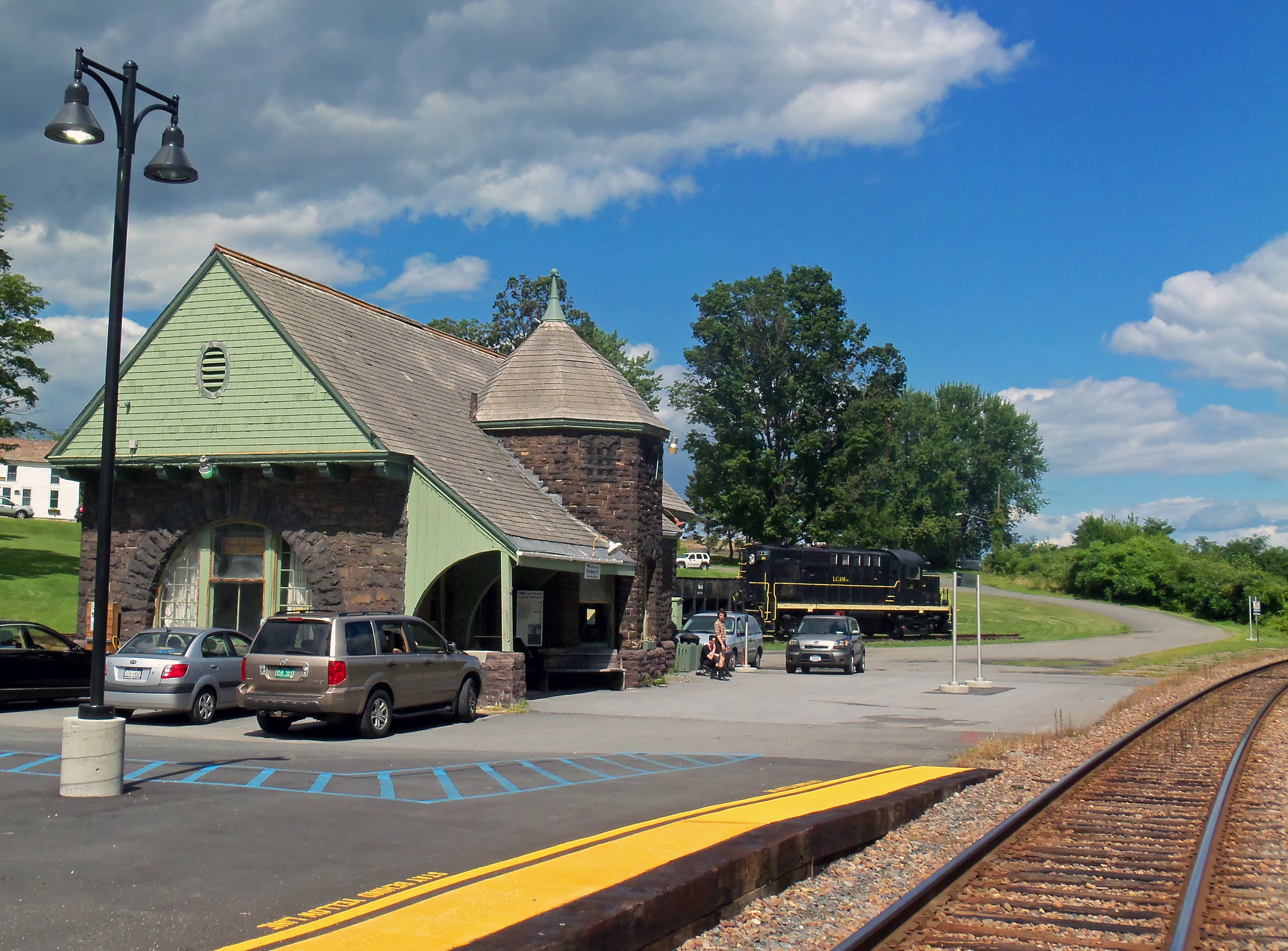
The Port Henry Amtrak station provides passenger rail service to the town.

As of the census of 2000, there were 4,879 people, 1,894 households, and 1,253 families residing in the town. The population density was 75.4 inhabitants per square mile (29.1/km^{2}). There were 2,253 housing units at an average density of 34.8 per square mile (13.4/km^{2}). The racial makeup of the town was 94.71% White, 2.79% African American, 0.20% Native American, 0.47% Asian, 0.06% Pacific Islander, 1.21% from other races, and 0.55% from two or more races. Hispanic or Latino of any race were 3.30% of the population.

There were 1,894 households, out of which 29.0% had children under the age of 18 living with them, 50.8% were married couples living together, 10.2% had a female householder with no husband present, and 33.8% were non-families. 28.5% of all households were made up of individuals, and 13.9% had someone living alone who was 65 years of age or older. The average household size was 2.40 and the average family size was 2.91.

In the town, the population was spread out, with 22.5% under the age of 18, 9.4% from 18 to 24, 29.3% from 25 to 44, 21.9% from 45 to 64, and 16.9% who were 65 years of age or older. The median age was 38 years. For every 100 females, there were 110.9 males. For every 100 females age 18 and over, there were 111.5 males.

The median income for a household in the town was $31,903, and the median income for a family was $39,827. Males had a median income of $31,747 versus $21,592 for females. The per capita income for the town was $19,721. About 8.5% of families and 12.8% of the population were below the poverty line, including 17.4% of those under age 18 and 7.0% of those age 65 or over.

== Communities and locations in Moriah ==
- Bartlett Pond - A pond by the northern town line, northeast of Mineville.
- Bulwagga Bay - A bay of Lake Champlain, southeast of Port Henry.
- Cheever - An area of Port Henry located north of the village along Route 9N on the way to Westport.
- Grover Hills - A hamlet north of Moriah Center and immediately south of Mineville at County Road 7 (Plank Road) and Pilfershire Road.
- Mineville - A hamlet northwest of Port Henry at County Road 7 (Plank Road/Fisher Hill Road) and County Road 6 (Raymond Wright Road).
- Moriah - The hamlet of Moriah is west of Port Henry at County Road 42 (Tarbell Hill Road) and County Road 7 (Center Road/Moriah Road).
- Moriah Center - A hamlet north of Moriah on County Road 7 (Plank Road/Center Road) at County Road 4 (Dugway Road/Ensign Pond Road) and County Road 70 (Witherbee Road).
- Mullen Bay - A bay of Lake Champlain, north of Port Henry by the northern town line.
- Newport Pond - A 25 acre pond beside County Road 6 (Tracy Road) west of Witherbee, seven miles west northwest of Port Henry. Namesake of a former royal fish pond in Newport, Essex, England.
- Port Henry - A hamlet (formerly a village) on the shore of Lake Champlain; functions as the economic center of the town.
- Witherbee - A hamlet near the northern town line and immediately west of Mineville at County Road 70 (Witherbee Road/Dalton Hill Road) and County Road 6 (Raymond Wright Road/Tracy Road).

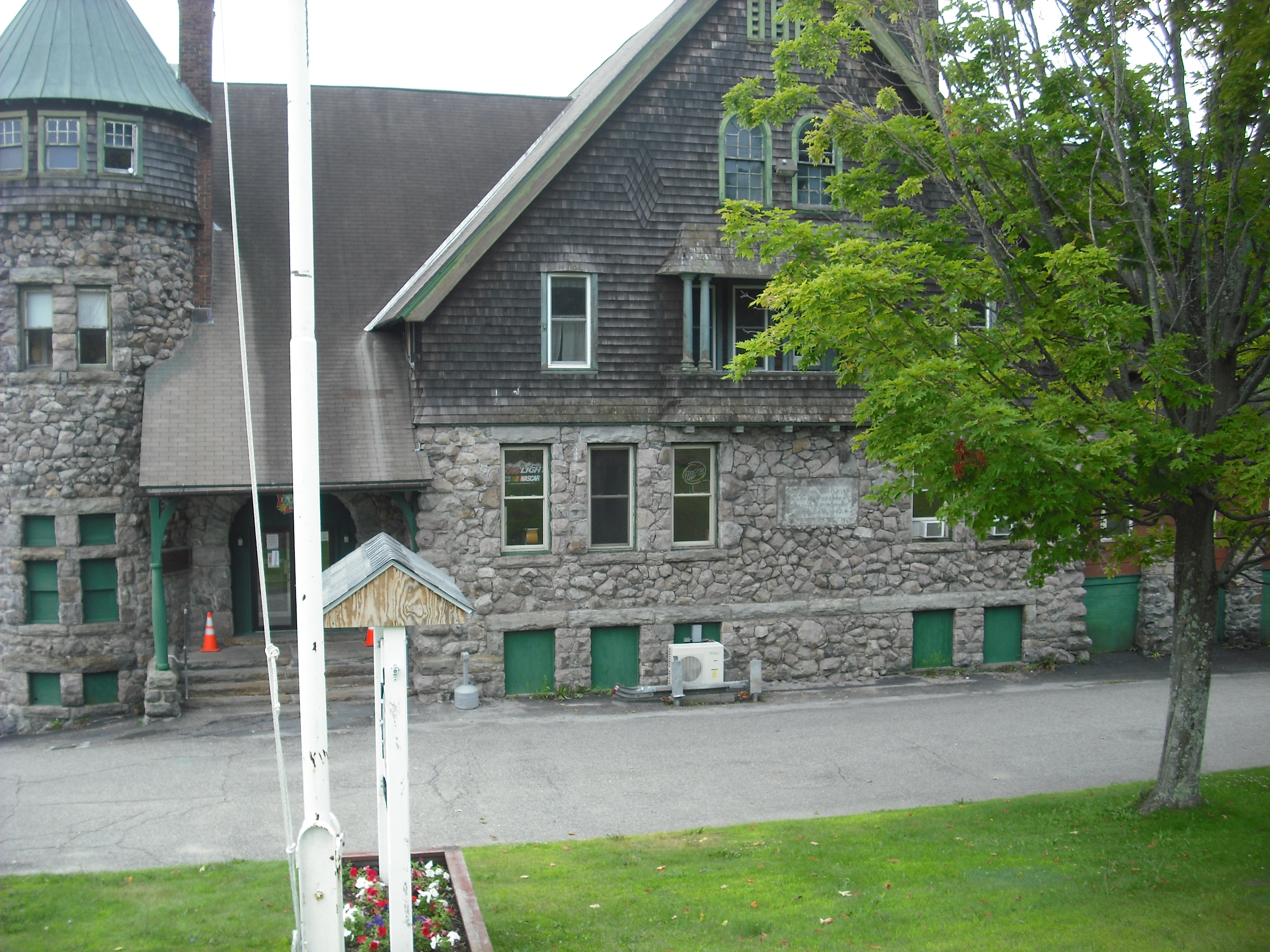
Witherbee Memorial Hall

== Notable people ==
- Tony Adamowicz, racing driver
- Robert Garrow, serial killer who murdered several women in the Syracuse area in 1973
- Johnny Podres, Brooklyn Dodgers pitcher and 1955 World Series MVP. Born in Witherbee.
- Jonathan Tarbell, born in Moriah, lieutenant colonel of the 91st New York Volunteer Infantry Regiment and promoted to brevet brigadier general of United States Volunteers during the American Civil War.
- Tom Tyler, early 20th-century film star
- Raymond R. Wright, Vietnam War Medal of Honor recipient
- Wallace T. Foote Jr., 19th-century US Congressman

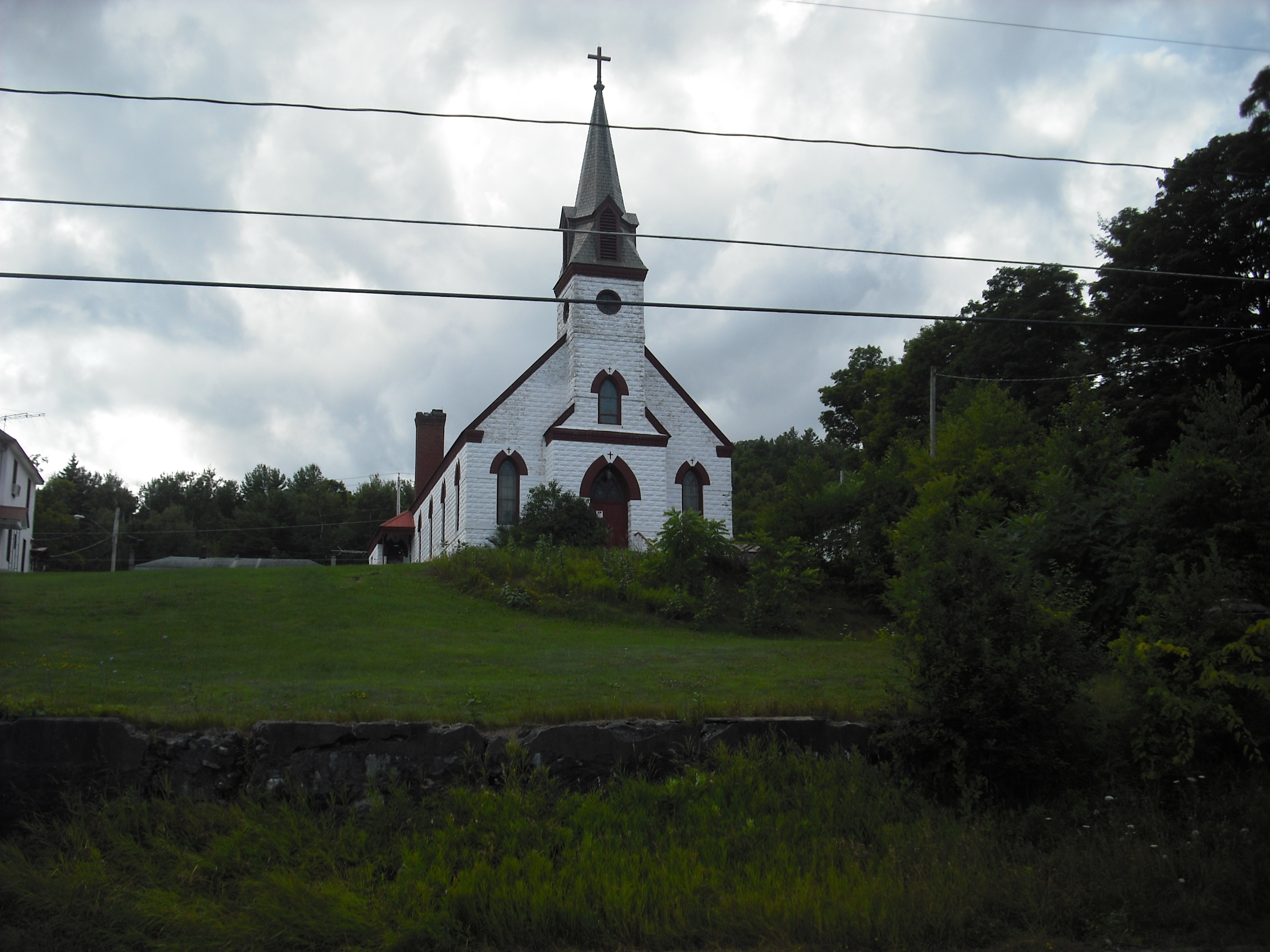
Former St. Michael's Catholic Church in Witherbee

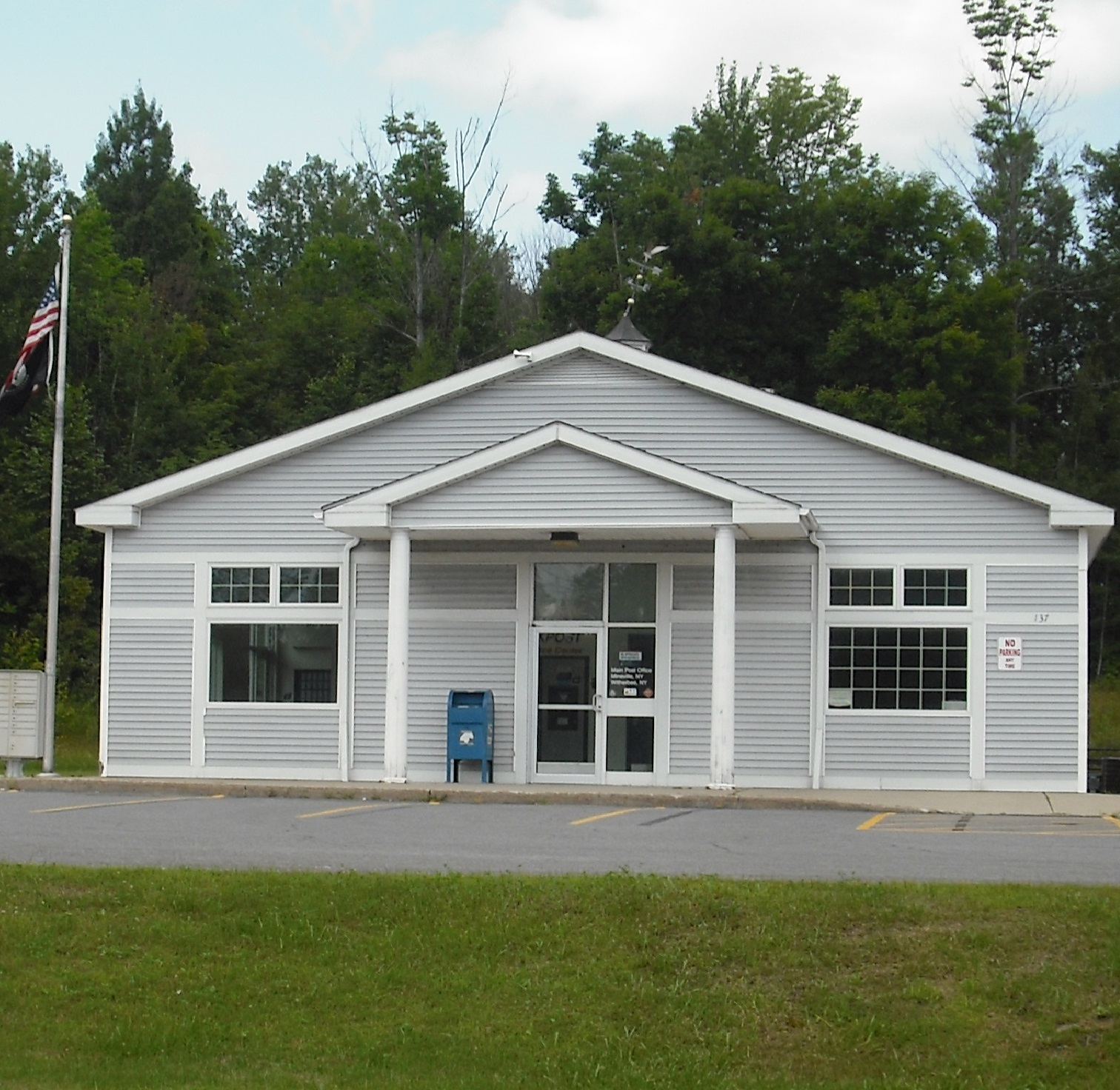
Mineville-Witherbee Post Office

== See also ==
- Moriah Central School District
