= Port Henry, New York =

- Hamlet and CDP
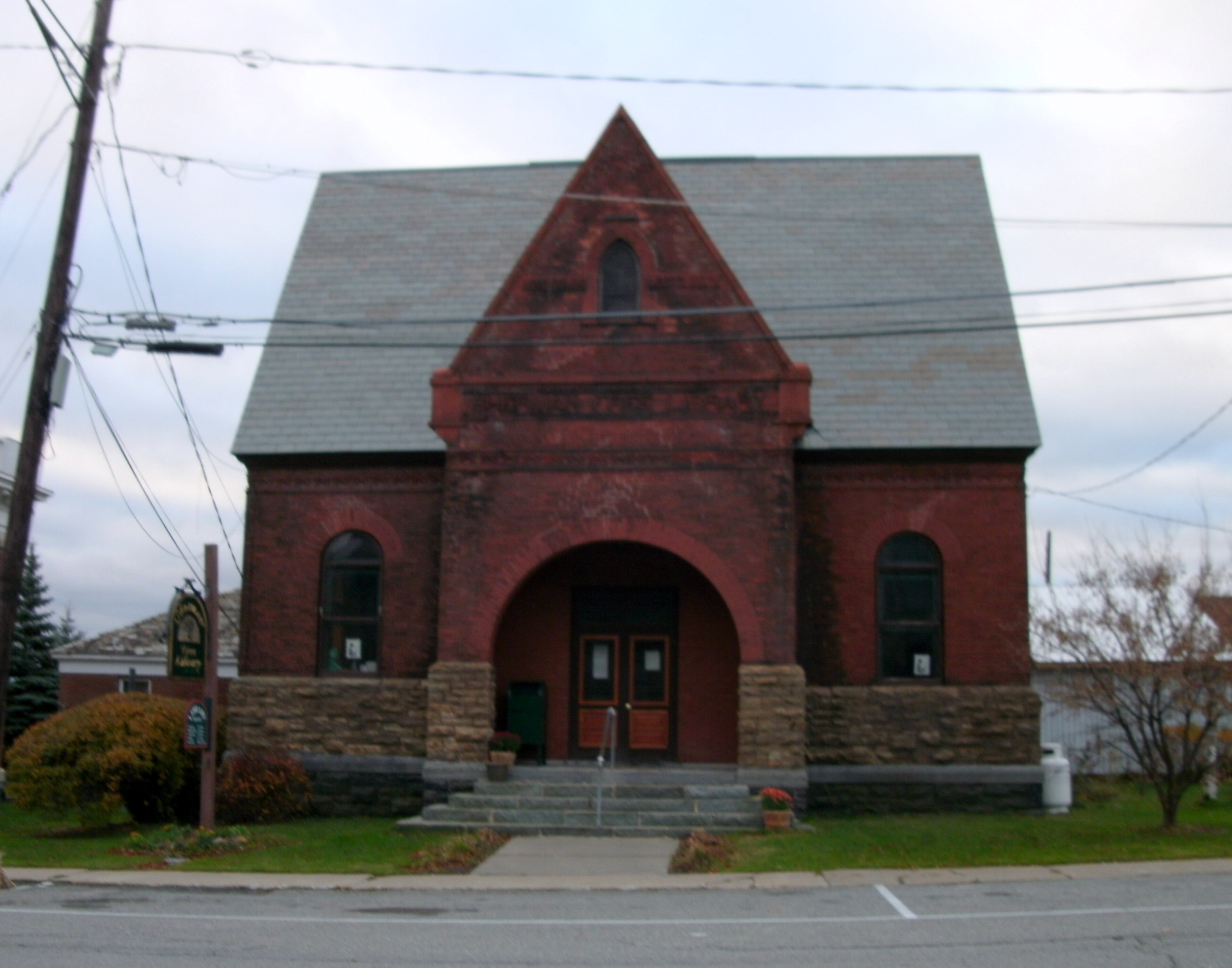
- Sherman Free Library

- Location in Essex County and the state of New York
- Coordinates: 44°2′43″N 73°27′40″W
- Country: United States
- State: New York
- County: Essex
- Town: Moriah
- Settled: 1785
- Incorporated: May 1, 1869
- Dissolved: March 31, 2017

Area
  - Total: 1.73 sq mi (4.48 km^{2})
  - Land: 1.39 sq mi (3.60 km^{2})
  - Water: 0.34 sq mi (0.88 km^{2})
- Elevation: 243 ft (74 m)

Population (2020)
  - Total: 1,150
  - Density: 826.9/sq mi (319.26/km^{2})
- Time zone: UTC-5 (Eastern (EST))
  - Summer (DST): UTC-4 (EDT)
- ZIP code: 12974
- Area code: 518
- FIPS code: 36-59333
- GNIS feature ID: 0960967
- Website: https://www.porthenrymoriah.com

Port Henry is a hamlet (and census-designated place) in Essex County, New York, United States. The population was 1,194 at the 2010 census.

Port Henry lies on the eastern side of the town of Moriah and is approximately one hour's drive (52 miles or 84 km) south of Plattsburgh. It is 44 miles (71 km) by road south-southwest of Burlington, Vermont, 115 miles (185 km) north of Albany and 113 miles (182 km) south of Montreal, Quebec.

== History ==
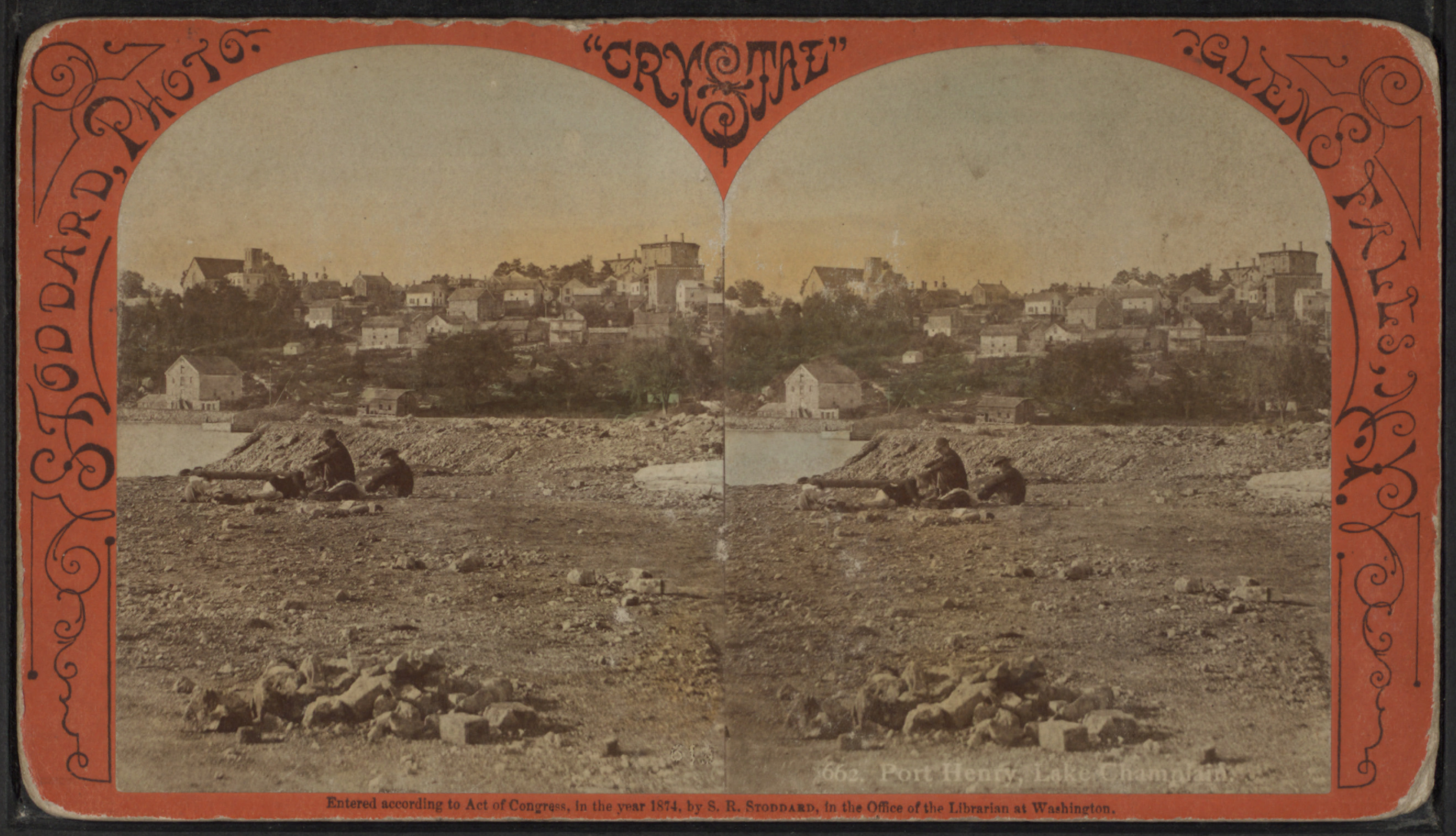
Stereoscopic photograph of Port Henry in 1874

Port Henry is in a tract of land set aside by the British Crown for veterans of the Seven Years' War (also known as the French and Indian War). Although a mill was built in 1765, no other European-American settlers arrived until 1785, after the American Revolutionary War.

The Iroquoian-speaking Mohawk and Oswegatchie, members of the Seven Nations of Canada, were still living in the town until after 1800.

Most of the Iroquois from the territory of New York had been resettled in Canada, forced out of New York and the United States due to their alliance with the British during the war. In the early years, timber harvesting was a major industry and 20 mills were located in the area. The first dock was built on Lake Champlain by 1820 for shipping lumber to other ports.

Perspective map of Port Henry from 1889 with list of landmarks by L.R. Burleigh

Early settlers discovered iron ore a few miles inland. Its extraction and processing became an important industry in the township for about one hundred and fifty years. A blast furnace constructed in 1822 in Port Henry was one of the first in the United States, and Republic Steel established major operations in the county. The village residents used Lake Champlain and the Hudson River to transport its ore and products to major markets such as Albany and New York City. Later a railroad connected the village to markets.

The village of Port Henry was incorporated in 1869. By the end of the 19th century, residents harvested smelt from the lake for the restaurant trade, by ice fishing. The Delaware & Hudson Railroad Depot, Moriah Town Office Building, Mount Moriah Presbyterian Church, Port Henry Fire Department Building, Sherman Free Library, and Van Ornam & Murdock Block are listed on the National Register of Historic Places. The Essex County Republican was published in Port Henry in the 19th and early 20th centuries, after which it moved to Keeseville.

Effective March 31, 2017, the Village of Port Henry was dissolved by the result of a public referendum. The village ceased to exist as a municipality. Village operations were absorbed by the Town of Moriah. Port Henry continues to exist as a hamlet within the town.

== Geography ==
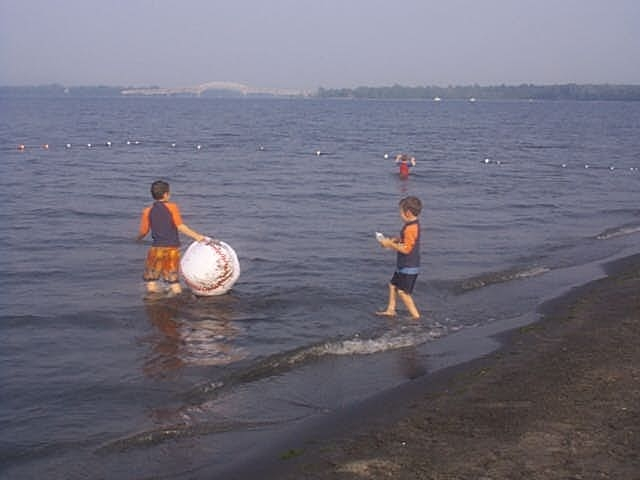
Lake Champlain at Port Henry (with 1929 bridge showing)

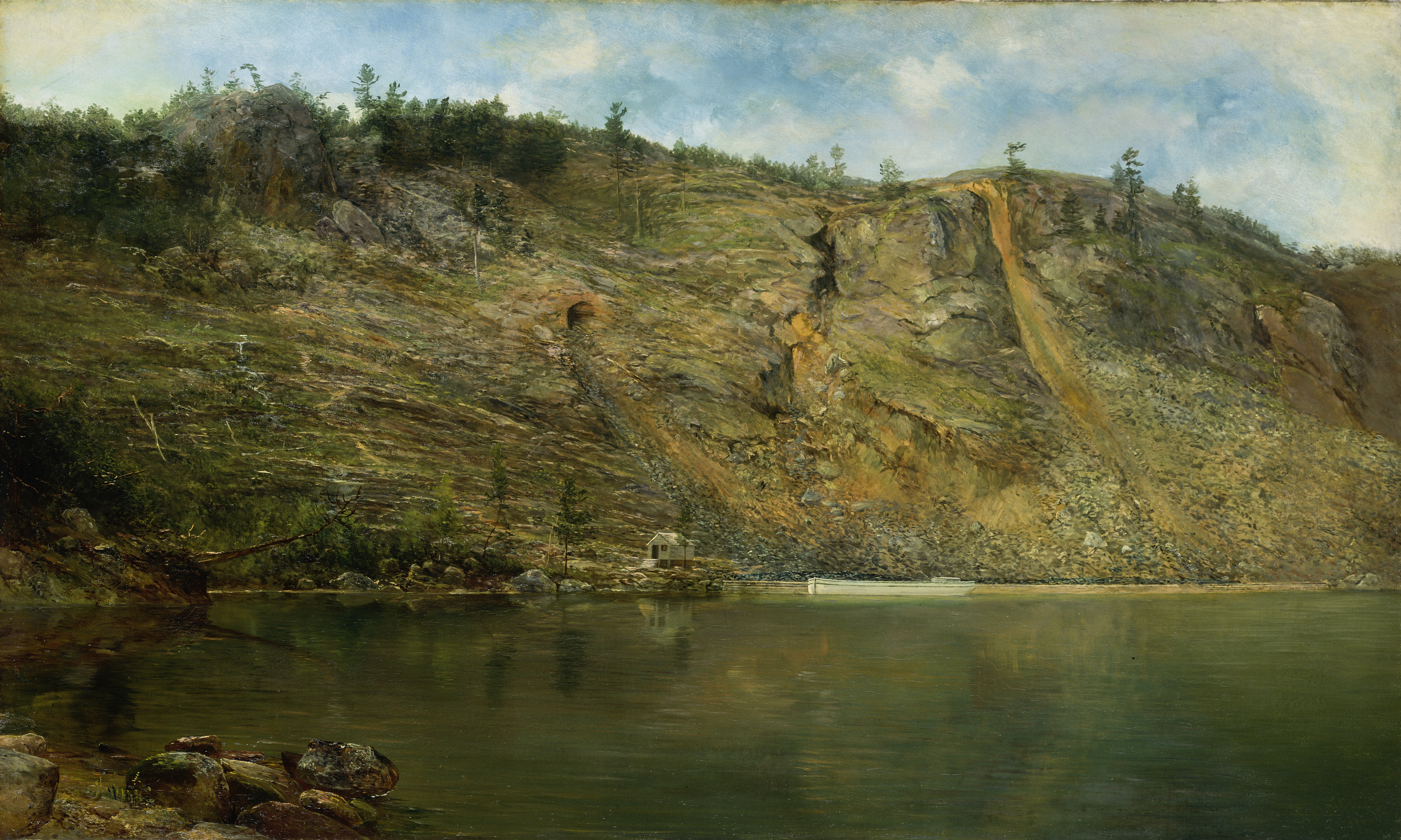
The Iron Mine, Port Henry, New York (at Craig Harbor), ca. 1862, by Homer Dodge Martin

Port Henry is located in eastern Essex County at 44°2′43″N 73°27′40″W (44.045238, −73.461011), in the eastern part of the town of Moriah. The village is on the western shore of Lake Champlain at the northern end of Bulwagga Bay and is in the Adirondack Park.

According to the United States Census Bureau, the village has a total area of 1.5 square miles (3.8 km^{2}), of which 1.2 square miles (3.0 km^{2}) is land and 0.3 square miles (0.8 km^{2}), or 20.29%, is water. Port Henry is located on conjoined New York State Route 9N and New York State Route 22 (North/South Main Street) at the junction of County Road 4 (Broad Street).

== Demographics ==
Historical population
Census	Pop.	Note	%±
1880	2,494		—
1890	2,436		−2.3%
1900	1,751		−28.1%
1910	2,266		29.4%
1920	2,183		−3.7%
1930	2,040		−6.6%
1940	1,935		−5.1%
1950	1,831		−5.4%
1960	1,767		−3.5%
1970	1,532		−13.3%
1980	1,450		−5.4%
1990	1,263		−12.9%
2000	1,152		−8.8%
2010	1,194		3.6%
2020	1,150		−3.7%
U.S. Decennial Census

As of the census of 2000, there were 1,152 people, 491 households, and 295 families residing in what was then village. The population density was 958.7 inhabitants per square mile (370.2/km^{2}). There were 596 housing units at an average density of 496.0 per square mile (191.5/km^{2}). The racial makeup of the village was 97.66% White, 0.52% African American, 0.09% Native American, 0.61% Asian, 0.61% from other races, and 0.52% from two or more races. Hispanic or Latino of any race were 1.30% of the population.

There were 491 households, out of which 27.9% had children under the age of 18 living with them, 42.0% were married couples living together, 12.8% had a female householder with no husband present, and 39.9% were non-families. 33.6% of all households were made up of individuals, and 16.7% had someone living alone who was 65 years of age or older. The average household size was 2.29 and the average family size was 2.90.

In the village, the population was spread out, with 24.7% under the age of 18, 7.8% from 18 to 24, 25.4% from 25 to 44, 22.1% from 45 to 64, and 19.9% who were 65 years of age or older. The median age was 40 years. For every 100 females, there were 94.6 males. For every 100 females age 18 and over, there were 86.9 males.

The median income for a household in the village was $29,306, and the median income for a family was $40,556. Males had a median income of $34,821 versus $20,703 for females. The per capita income for the village was $17,455. About 12.2% of families and 19.2% of the population were below the poverty line, including 27.6% of those under age 18 and 10.7% of those age 65 or over.

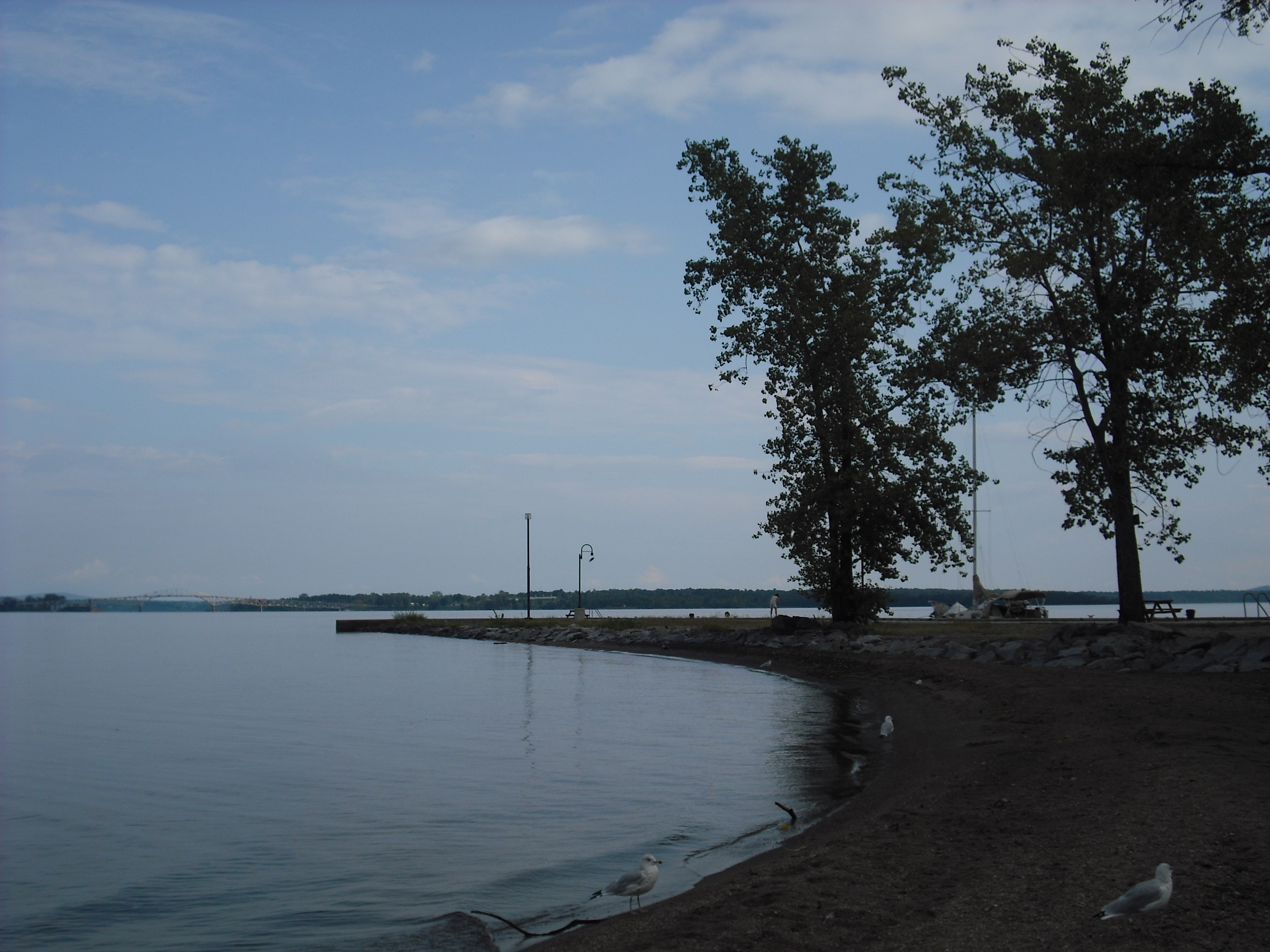
Public pier on Lake Champlain in Port Henry, NY

== Transportation ==
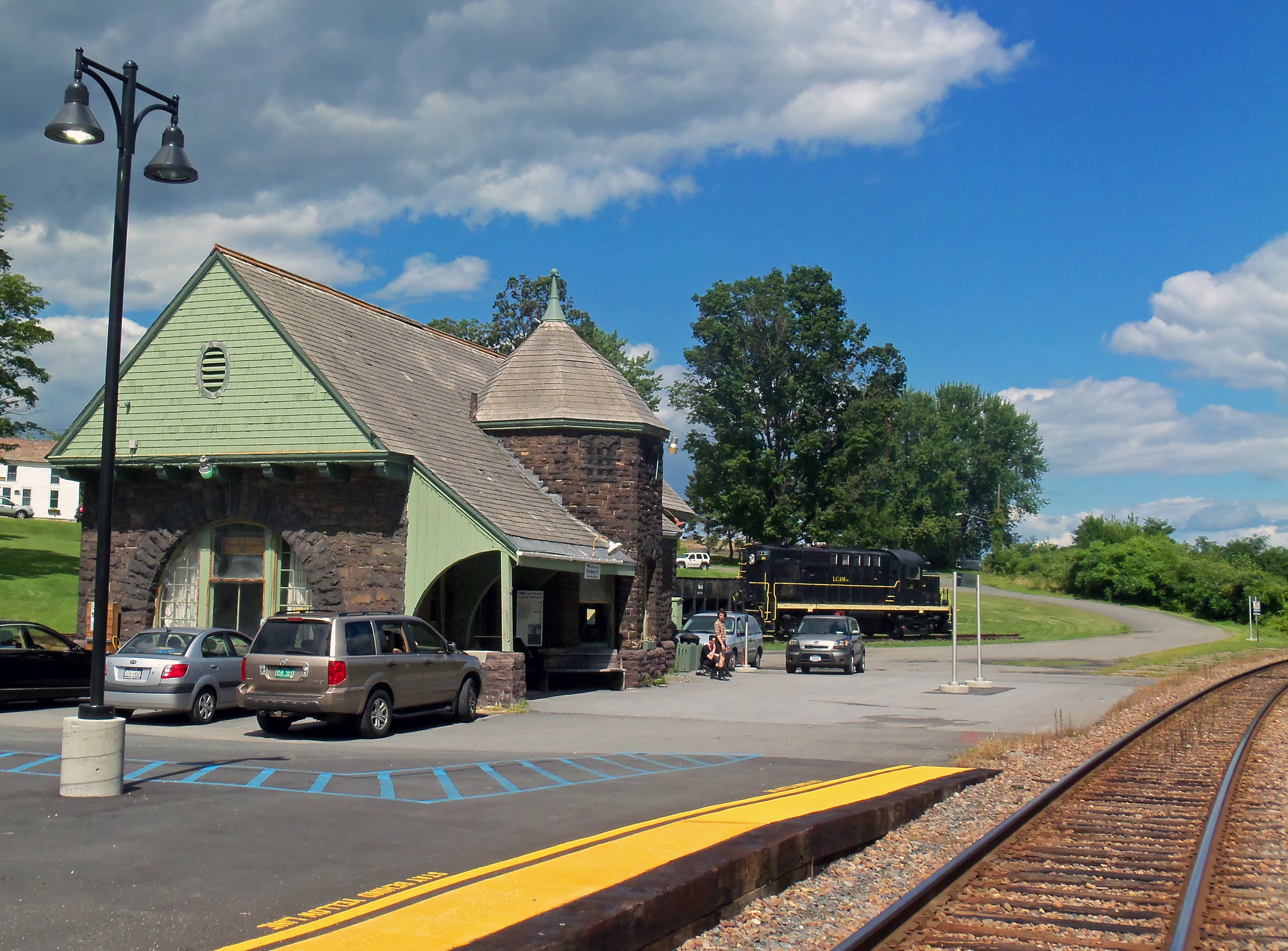
The Port Henry Amtrak station

Amtrak, the national passenger rail system, provides service to Port Henry, operating its Adirondack daily in both directions between Montreal, Canada and New York City.

A few miles south of Port Henry, the Champlain Bridge was built in 1929, connecting Crown Point to Vermont. In 2009, the bridge was demolished. A temporary ferry service, operated by the Lake Champlain Transportation Company and funded by the states of New York and Vermont, provided access to Vermont until a new bridge (Route 185) at the same location opened in November 2011.

== Education ==
The census-designated place is in the Moriah Central School District.

== Notable residents ==
- Tom Tyler (1903–1954), actor in Westerns during the eras of silent and sound films
- Wallace T. Foote Jr. 19th century US Congressman

== Cultural references ==
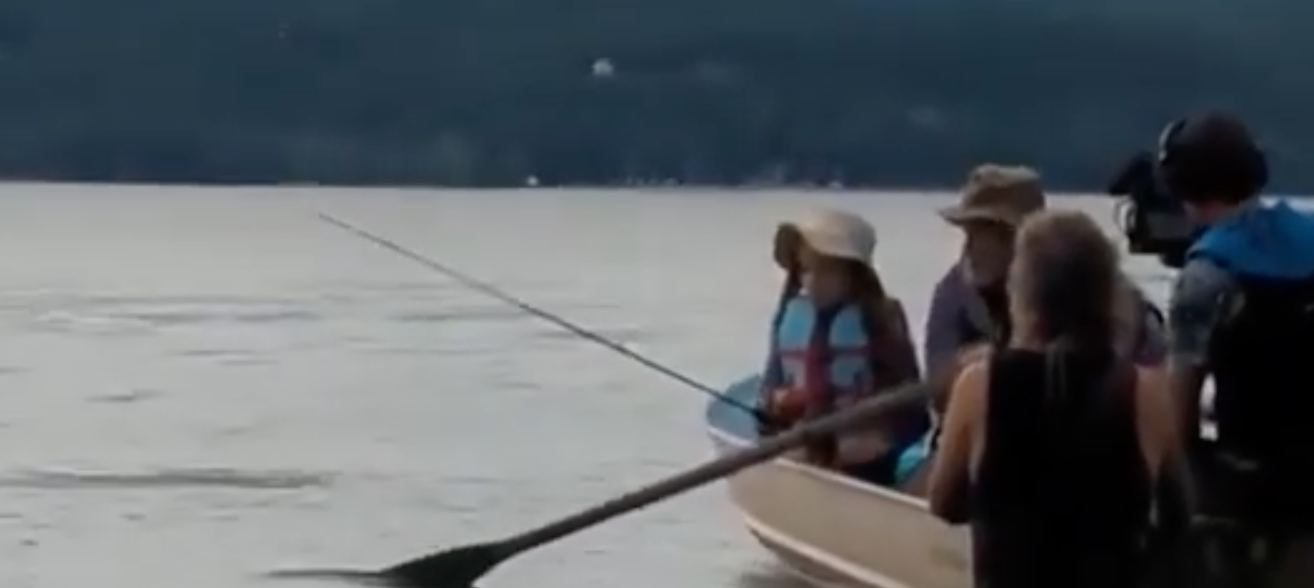
Cameramen film in Port Henry on Lake Champlain for the film "Lucy & the Lake Monster."

The family drama movie Lucy and the Lake Monster filmed in Port Henry in July and August, 2022. Newspapers in Port Henry reported the film finished in 2024, and premiered in the Lake Champlain region in September, 2024. As of 2025, the film has garnered multiple awards on the film festival circuit and is streaming on Amazon and Plex. A sequel to the film, The Secrets of Lake Champlain filmed in Port Henry, Bulwagga Bay, Westport, Ticonderoga, and Moriah, New York in July and August of 2025.
