= New Russia, New York =

- Hamlet
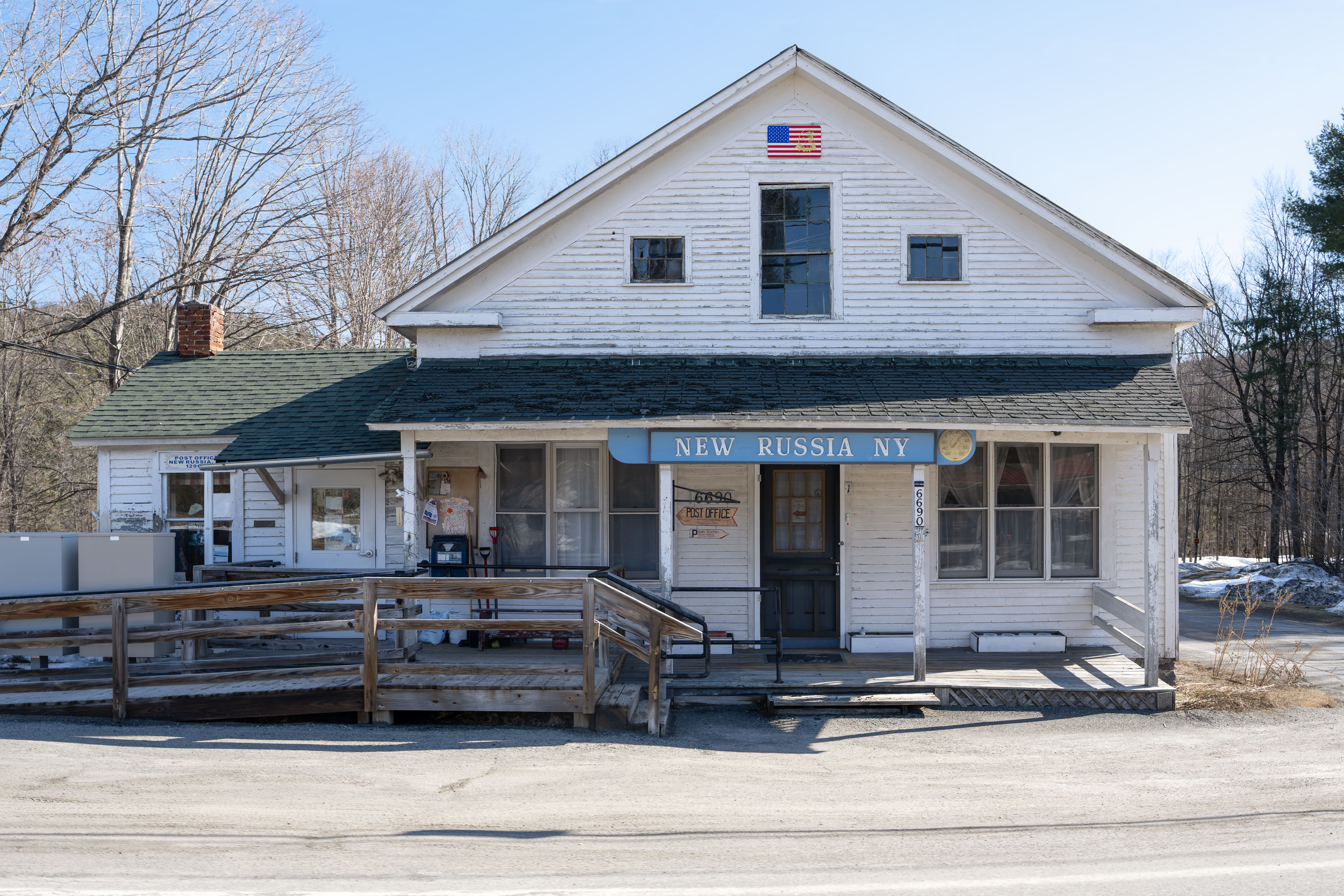
- Post office

- Location within New York Adirondack Park Location within New York Location within the United States
- Country: United States
- State: New York
- County: Essex
- Town: Elizabethtown
- Time zone: UTC-5 (Eastern (EST))
  - Summer (DST): UTC-4 (EDT)
- ZIP Code: 12964
- Area code: 518

New Russia is a hamlet in the town of Elizabethtown, Essex County, New York, United States. It is located along U.S. Route 9, south of the hamlet of Elizabethtown.

== History ==
The area was first settled in 1792 by Revolutionary War veterans from Vermont. Essex County Clerk Edmund Williams named the settlement New Russia in 1845, during the height of local iron-mining activity; the name was likely intended to associate the area with high-grade Russian iron.

Ironworking was an early industry in the hamlet. Basil Bishop built an iron forge at New Russia in 1825, using water power from Split Rock Falls.

Tourism later became important along the old State Road, now U.S. Route 9. Hunter's Home, an expanded hotel dating from an earlier hotel built in 1830, operated in New Russia until its main building burned in 1925. The completion of the Adirondack Northway in 1967 diverted through traffic away from Route 9 and contributed to the decline of roadside businesses in the hamlet.

== Geography ==
New Russia is in the southern part of the town of Elizabethtown. The Boquet River passes through the area; a United States Geological Survey stream-gaging station is located on the river near the bridge on Simonds Hill Road and 4.5 miles south of Elizabethtown.

Split Rock Falls, on the Boquet River near U.S. Route 9, is one of the hamlet's better-known local landmarks.

== Education ==
New Russia is served by the Boquet Valley Central School District, which operates in Elizabethtown and Westport.

== Government and infrastructure ==
The New Russia Post Office is located at 6690 U.S. Route 9.
