= Hubbard Hall =

Hubbard Hall can refer to:

- Hubbard Hall (Annapolis, Maryland), also known as "the Boat House," a building at the United States Naval Academy in Annapolis, Maryland, that serves as the home of the academy's rowing teams
- Hubbard Hall (Cambridge, New York) is a theater and community arts center in Cambridge, New York
- Hubbard Hall (Elizabethtown, New York), also known as Kellogg House and Elizabethtown Community House, a historic home located at Elizabethtown in Essex County, New York
- Hubbard Hall (East Lansing, Michigan), a part of the Michigan State University dormitory system.
- Hubbard Hall, at the Clarke Schools for Hearing and Speech in Northampton, Massachusetts
- Hubbard-Hall, a chemicals distribution company
