= Elizabethtown, New York =

- Town
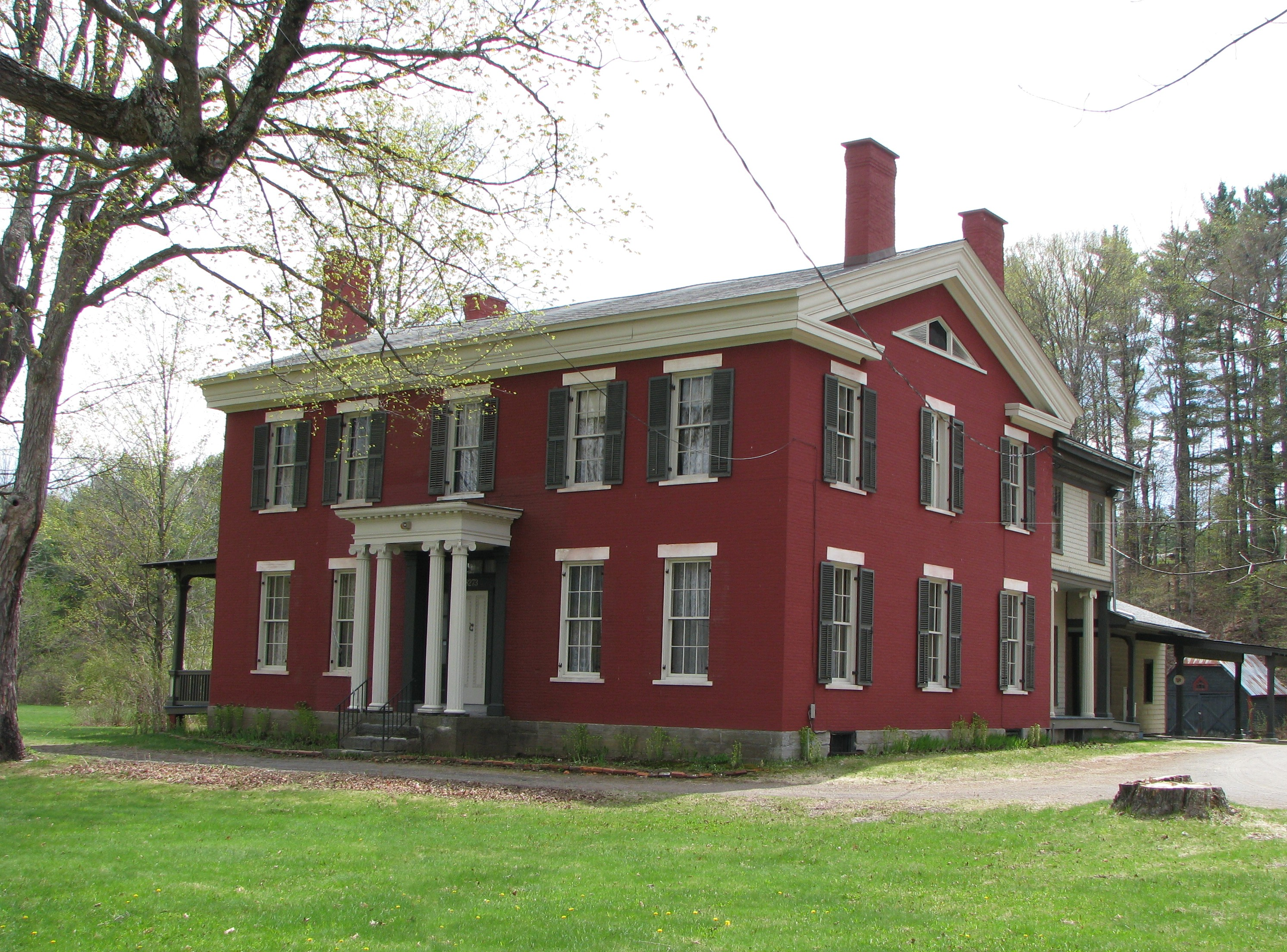
- Hand House, on the National Register of Historic Places
- Motto: "Eastern Gateway to the Adirondack Mountains"
- Location in Essex County and the state of New York
- Coordinates: 44°11′30″N 73°35′38″W
- Country: United States
- State: New York
- County: Essex

Government
  - Type: Town Council
  - Town Supervisor: Cathy Reusser (R)
  - Town Council: Members' List: • Jeff Allott; • Ben Morris; • Bill Wright; • Adam Bailey

Area
  - Total: 83.11 sq mi (215.25 km^{2})
  - Land: 81.63 sq mi (211.43 km^{2})
  - Water: 1.47 sq mi (3.82 km^{2})
- Elevation: 607 ft (185 m)

Population (2020)
  - Total: 1,203
  - Density: 13.8/sq mi (5.33/km^{2})
- Time zone: UTC-5 (Eastern (EST))
  - Summer (DST): UTC-4 (EDT)
- ZIP Codes: 12932 (Elizabethtown); 12964 (New Russia)
- Area code: 518
- FIPS code: 36-031-23833
- GNIS feature ID: 0978930
- Website: elizabethtown-ny.gov

Elizabethtown is a town in Essex County, New York, United States. The population was 1,163 at the 2010 census. The county seat of Essex County is the hamlet of Elizabethtown, located in the northern part of the town. The name is derived from Elizabeth Gilliland, the wife of an early settler.

Elizabethtown is in the east-central part of Essex County. It is 39 miles (63 km) southwest of Burlington, Vermont, 104 miles (167 km) south of Montreal, Quebec, and 117 miles (188 km) north of Albany. The town calls itself the "Pleasant Valley".

== History ==
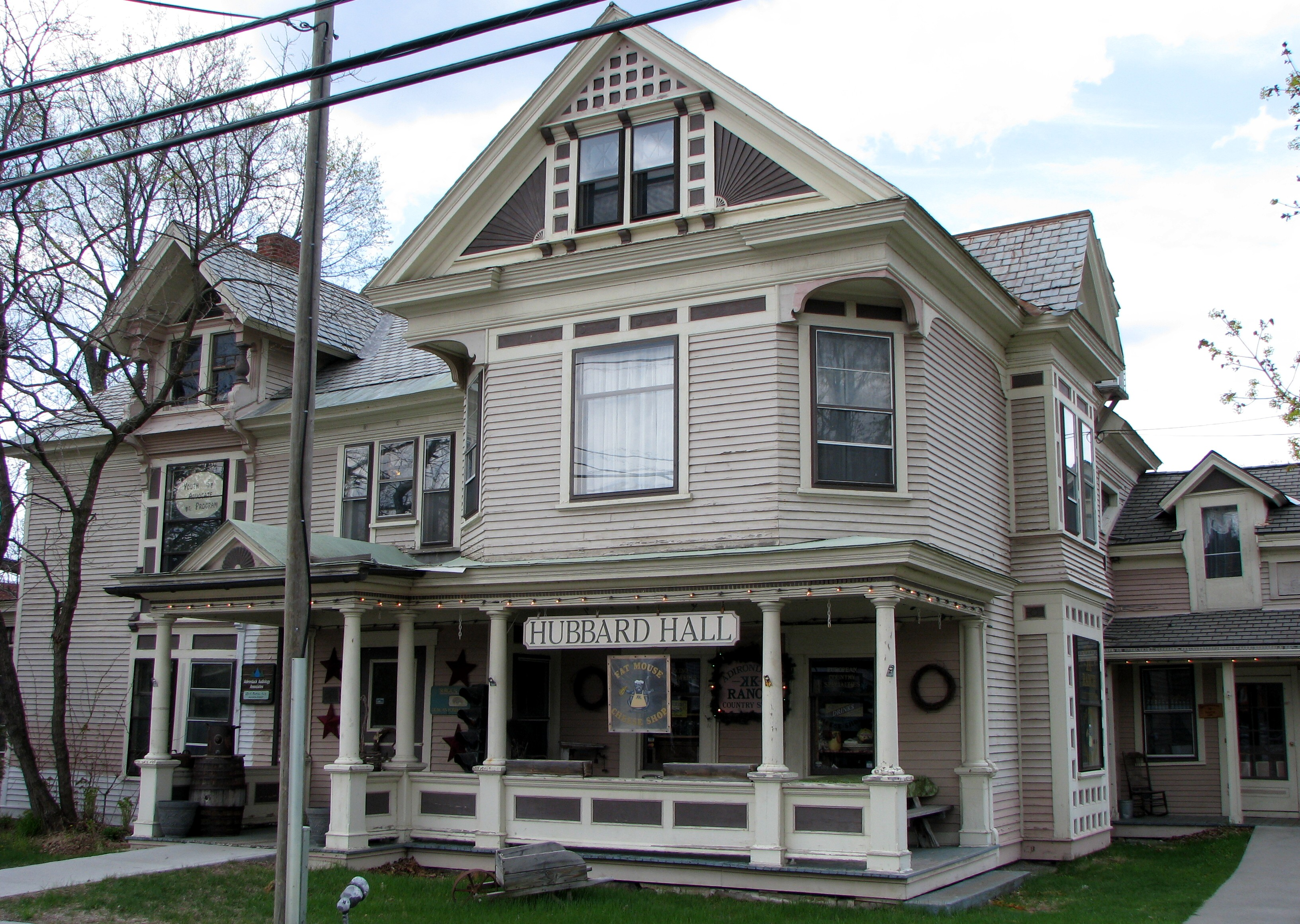
Hubbard Hall, built in 1839, served as the town's hospital until 1966. It was destroyed by fire in 2011.

William Gilliland, an investor, bought up large tracts of land in Essex County. The town was first settled around 1792 near New Russia.

The town of Elizabethtown was established in 1798 from the town of Crown Point. The community of Elizabethtown in this town became the county seat, succeeding a location in the town of Essex. Parts of the town were used to form the towns of Moriah (1808), Keene (1898), and Westport (1815).

The lumber industry and processing iron ore were important in the beginning, but tourism became prominent by the end of the 19th century.

The Hand-Hale Historic District and Hubbard Hall are listed on the National Register of Historic Places.

== Geography ==
According to the United States Census Bureau, the town has a total area of 83.1 square miles (215.3 km^{2}), of which 81.6 square miles (211.4 km^{2}) is land and 1.5 square miles (3.8 km^{2}), or 1.78%, is water.

The Black River, a northward-flowing tributary of the Boquet River, marks part of the eastern town line.

Interstate 87, the Northway, is a major divided highway passing through the southeastern part of Elizabethtown. There are no exits within the town limits; the closest access is from Exit 32 (Stowersville Rd), just to the north in Lewis and from Exit 31 (NY 9N) just to the east in Westport. U.S. Route 9 is a north-south highway. New York State Route 9N is an east-west highway, which intersects U.S. Route 9 in downtown Elizabethtown. The town is also in the Adirondack High Peaks region, and is 18 miles (29 km) from Mount Marcy, the highest point in the state.

== Demographics ==
Historical population
Census	Pop.	Note	%±
1820	889		—
1830	1,015		14.2%
1840	1,061		4.5%
1850	1,635		54.1%
1860	1,343		−17.9%
1870	1,488		10.8%
1880	1,363		−8.4%
1890	1,399		2.6%
1900	1,131		−19.2%
1910	1,108		−2.0%
1920	1,042		−6.0%
1930	1,113		6.8%
1940	1,181		6.1%
1950	1,208		2.3%
1960	1,328		9.9%
1970	1,284		−3.3%
1980	1,267		−1.3%
1990	1,314		3.7%
2000	1,315		0.1%
2010	1,163		−11.6%
2020	1,203		3.4%
U.S. Decennial Census

As of the census of 2000, there were 1,315 people, 497 households, and 318 families residing in the town. The population density was 16.1 inhabitants per square mile (6.2/km^{2}). There were 794 housing units at an average density of 9.7 per square mile (3.7/km^{2}). The racial makeup of the town was 97.49% White, 0.68% African American, 0.61% Asian, 0.08% Pacific Islander, 0.23% from other races, and 0.91% from two or more races. Hispanic or Latino of any race were 0.38% of the population.

There were 497 households, out of which 30.8% had children under the age of 18 living with them, 51.7% were married couples living together, 8.5% had a female householder with no husband present, and 36.0% were non-families. 31.4% of all households were made up of individuals, and 16.7% had someone living alone who was 65 years of age or older. The average household size was 2.32 and the average family size was 2.92.

In the town, the population was spread out, with 23.1% under the age of 18, 4.5% from 18 to 24, 22.1% from 25 to 44, 26.3% from 45 to 64, and 24.0% who were 65 years of age or older. The median age was 45 years. For every 100 females, there were 94.0 males. For every 100 females age 18 and over, there were 87.6 males.

The median income for a household in the town was $32,244, and the median income for a family was $44,531. Males had a median income of $28,295 versus $23,594 for females. The per capita income for the town was $17,059. About 9.1% of families and 15.7% of the population were below the poverty line, including 20.8% of those under age 18 and 10.4% of those age 65 or over.

== Communities and locations in Elizabethtown ==
- Black River – A small river that flows northward out of Lincoln Pond.
- Boquet River – A small river that flows northward through the center of the town, it is a tributary of Lake Champlain.
- Colonial Garden – A display garden in Elizabethtown on US-9 / NY-9N, behind the Essex County Historical Society / Adirondack History Center Museum.
- Elizabethtown – The hamlet of Elizabethtown is at the junction of US-9 and NY-9N. The community has been the county seat since 1807.
- Euba Mills – A location in the southwestern corner of the town on US-9, at the junction of County Road 70.
- Hurricane Mountain – A notable elevation in the northwestern part of Elizabethtown.
- Lincoln Pond – A lake in the southeastern part of the town.
- New Pond – A small lake at the southern town line near Euba Mills.
- New Russia – A hamlet south of Elizabethtown on US-9.
- Pauline Murdock Wildlife Management Area – A conservation area northeast of Elizabethtown hamlet.

== Notable people ==
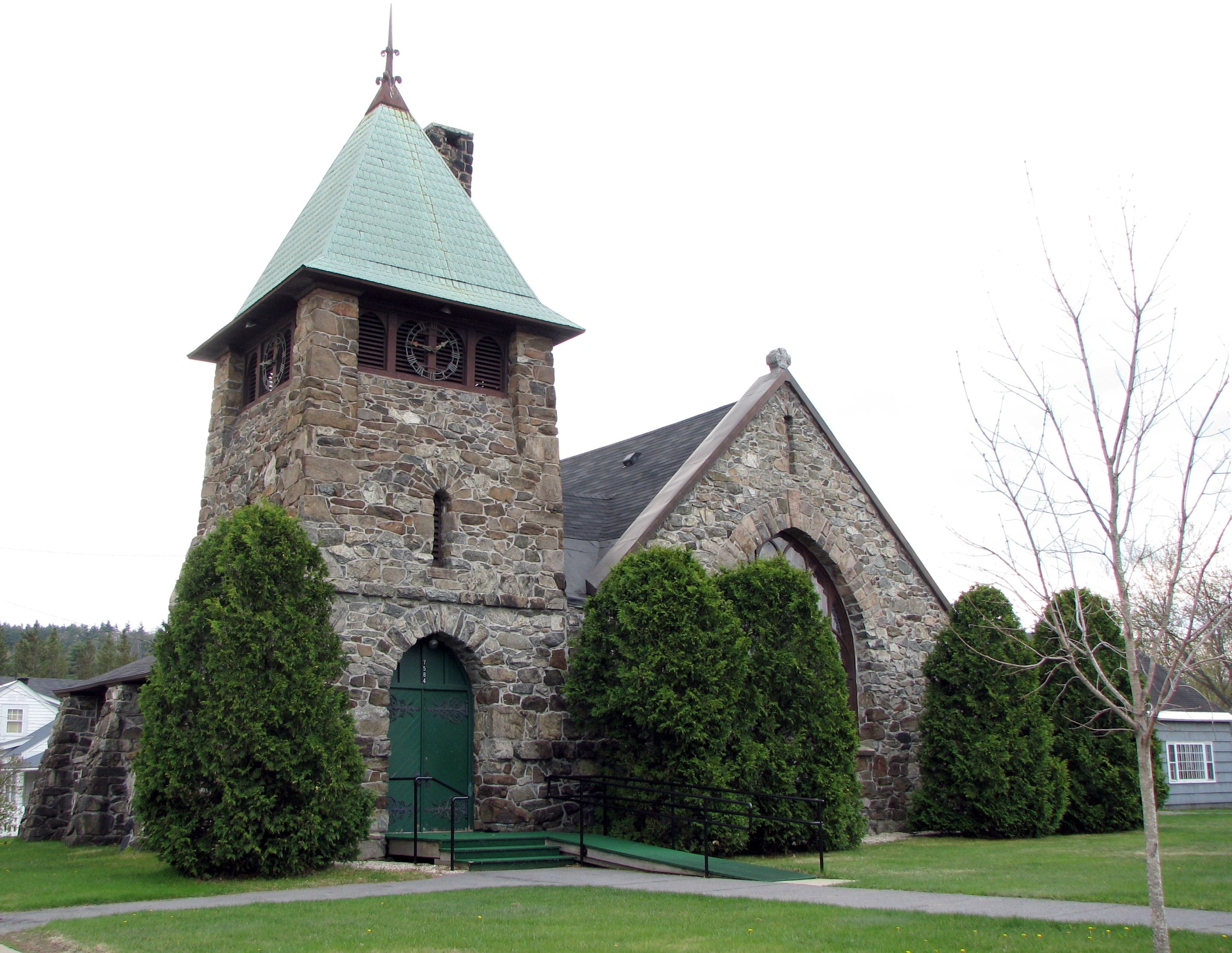
United Church of Christ

- Ezra C. Gross, U.S. Representative from New York (1819–1821)
- Robert S. Hale, U.S. Representative from New York (1866–1867 and 1873–1875)
- Augustus C. Hand, U.S. Representative from New York (1839–1841)
- Augustus Noble Hand, judge who served on the United States District Court for the Southern District of New York
- Learned Hand, judge of United States Court of Appeals for the Second Circuit
- Orlando Kellogg, U.S. Representative from New York (1847–1849 and 1863–1865)
- Thomas W. Lamb, architect
- Dermont E. Miner, golf professional and golf course architect, the first American-born professional golfer
- Gregor Piatigorsky, cellist
- Jacqueline Piatigorsky, chess and tennis champion, author, sculptor
- Charles Poletti, 46th governor of New York
- Mary Post, pioneer of education in Arizona
