= Sally J. Smith (artist) =

American artist

Sally J. Smith is an American artist who creates fairy house sculptures and land art. She is based in Westport, New York near Lake Champlain in the Adirondack Mountains. She grew up in Shelburne, Vermont and previously worked as a watercolorist and illustrator.

Smith runs the artist studio Greenspirit Arts. She makes sculpted fairy houses out of natural and human-made material, with most of the houses standing 12 to 18 inches tall. She creates both temporary fairy houses in nature and others for indoor display. In 2017, her book Fairy Houses, How to Create Whimsical Homes for Fairy Folk was published by Cool Springs Press.

Her work is held in the permanent collection of the Henry Sheldon Museum of Vermont History.

== Works ==
=== Illustrator ===
- Grandfather Four Winds and Rising Moon (1994) by Michael Channin
- Dragon Soup (1996) by Arlene Williams

=== Author ===
- Fairy Houses, How to Create Whimsical Homes for Fairy Folk (2017)
