= Westport, New York =

- Town
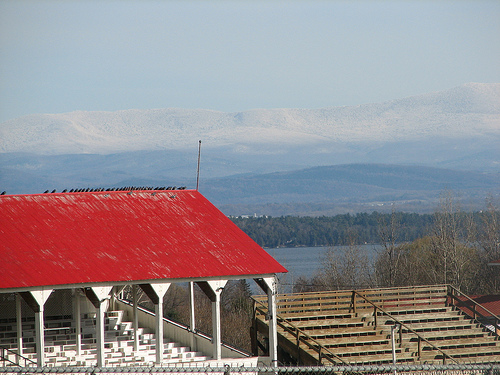
- Essex County Fairgrounds in Westport, with Lake Champlain and Vermont in the background
- Motto: "A gateway to the Adirondack Mountains"
- Location in Essex County and the state of New York
- Coordinates: 44°11′N 73°26′W
- Country: United States
- State: New York
- County: Essex

Government
  - Type: Town Council
  - Town Supervisor: Michael K. Tyler (R)
  - Town Council: Members' List: • Barry Morrison; • Michael Brankman; • David Kirkby; • Steven Viens

Area
  - Total: 66.81 sq mi (173.03 km^{2})
  - Land: 58.17 sq mi (150.66 km^{2})
  - Water: 8.64 sq mi (22.37 km^{2})
- Elevation: 226 ft (69 m)

Population (2020)
  - Total: 1,320
  - Density: 22.1/sq mi (8.53/km^{2})
- Time zone: UTC−5 (Eastern (EST))
  - Summer (DST): UTC−4 (EDT)
- ZIP Codes: 12993 (Westport); 12936 (Essex)
- Area code: 518
- FIPS code: 36-031-80775
- GNIS feature ID: 0979625
- Website: www.westportny.net

Westport is a town in Essex County, New York, United States overlooking Lake Champlain. The population was 1,320 at the 2020 census.

The town is on the eastern border of the county and is 41 miles (66 km) south of Plattsburgh and 103 miles (166 km) south of Montreal, Quebec, Canada. Westport is inside the Adirondack Park.

Westport is the birthplace of the Adirondack chair.

The Essex County Fair is held in the town. The Essex County Fairgrounds was added to the National Register of Historic Places in 2005.

== History ==
=== Early history ===
In 1642, Jesuit missionary Isaac Jogues was tortured by Iroquois at Coles Bay. He survived and was eventually saved by merchants from New Amsterdam.

The town was founded by William Gilliland in 1764 who surveyed an area in the southern part of the town and was granted 2,300 acres (9.3 km^{2}); he also established the neighboring towns of Elizabethtown, named for his wife, and Willsboro. Gilliland originally called his patent "Bessboro" after his little daughter. The original settlement, which may have supplied wood to Benedict Arnold's troops, was completely destroyed during the American Revolutionary War in connection with British General John Burgoyne's march from Canada to Saratoga. The first permanent settlement was in 1785.

=== Incorporation ===
The town of Westport was established in 1815 from part of the town of Elizabethtown. The community of Westport in the center of town incorporated as a village in 1907. The community abandoned its status as an incorporated village on December 31, 1992.

=== Westport the resort ===
By the mid-nineteenth century, Westport was a fashionable resort town. Its social scene was regularly reported on in The New York Times and by the Boston press. Like many other East Coast resorts, its popularity gradually declined, starting in the 1930s, as first automobiles and then airplanes made possible a wider selection of vacation sites. Since the 1950s, however, Westport's lakeshore property has steadily increased in value. Although once most of the "summer people" stayed for weeks, now distinctions are not as clear: there are "year-round summer people" whose livelihood stems from outside Westport, weekenders whose principal residence is fairly close by (for example, Albany, which is two hours distant by car), and commuters to workplaces as distant as Plattsburgh, New York, or Middlebury, Vermont.

Westport is home to Camp Dudley, the oldest summer camp in continuous operation in the United States, founded in 1885 by Sumner F. Dudley, who moved to Westport in 1891. Meadowmount, the summer school for string players founded by Ivan Galamian, is 8 miles (13 km) northwest of the center of town, in the town of Lewis. Westport is known as the ice fishing capital of Essex County.

Westport is home to one of the only two professional theatres in the Adirondacks proper, the second being Pendragon Theatre in Saranac Lake. The Depot Theatre was founded in 1979 and operates out of the historic Amtrak railway station. The 136-seat, air-conditioned theatre hosts plays and musicals on its main stage during the summer months, as well as an annual gala.

The Camp Dudley Road Historic District, Champlain II Shipwreck, Essex County Fairgrounds, First Congregational and Presbyterian Society Church of Westport, Lake View Grange No. 970, and Vergennes canal boat are listed on the National Register of Historic Places.

== Geography ==
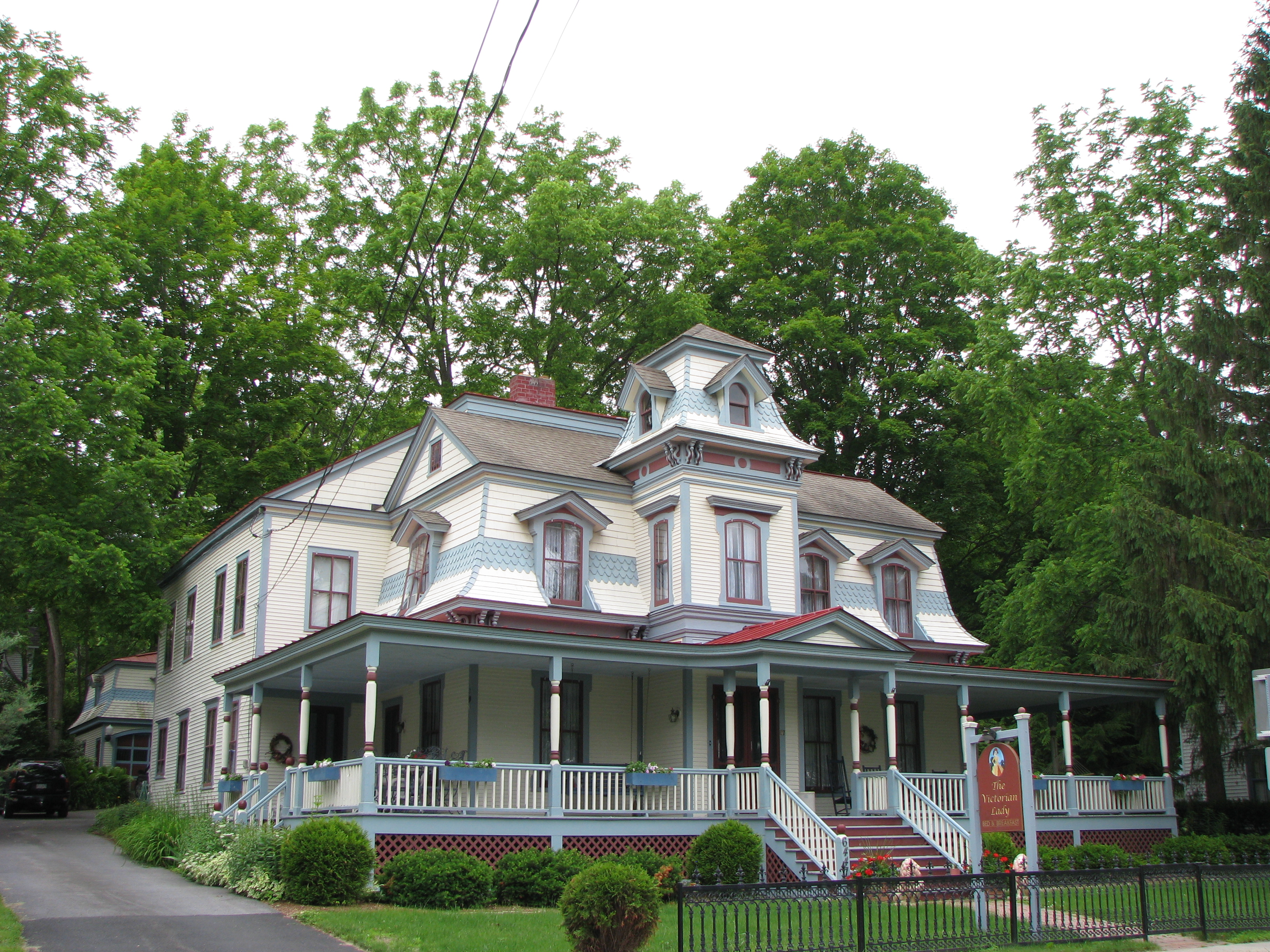
One of many historic houses in Westport

According to the United States Census Bureau, the town has a total area of 66.8 square miles (173.0 km^{2}), of which 58.2 square miles (150.7 km^{2}) is land and 8.6 square miles (22.4 km^{2}), or 12.93%, is water.

The eastern town line is formed by Lake Champlain and the border of Vermont. The town is inside the Adirondack Park.

New York State Route 9N, New York State Route 22, and County Route 44 are north-south highways in Westport. NY-9N and NY-22 become conjoined in Westport village. Interstate 87, the Northway, passes across the northwestern part of Westport, with access from Exit 31 (NY-9N).

=== Birding ===
Several sites on the Lake Champlain Birding Trail are located in Westport:

- Coon Mountain Preserve (administered by The Nature Conservancy)
- Webb Royce Swamp
- Westport Boat Launch

== Demographics ==
Historical population
Census	Pop.	Note	%±
1820	1,095		—
1830	1,513		38.2%
1840	1,932		27.7%
1850	2,352		21.7%
1860	1,981		−15.8%
1870	1,577		−20.4%
1880	1,737		10.1%
1890	1,864		7.3%
1900	1,727		−7.3%
1910	1,867		8.1%
1920	1,492		−20.1%
1930	1,534		2.8%
1940	1,657		8.0%
1950	1,597		−3.6%
1960	1,565		−2.0%
1970	1,453		−7.2%
1980	1,439		−1.0%
1990	1,446		0.5%
2000	1,362		−5.8%
2010	1,312		−3.7%
2020	1,320		0.6%
U.S. Decennial Census

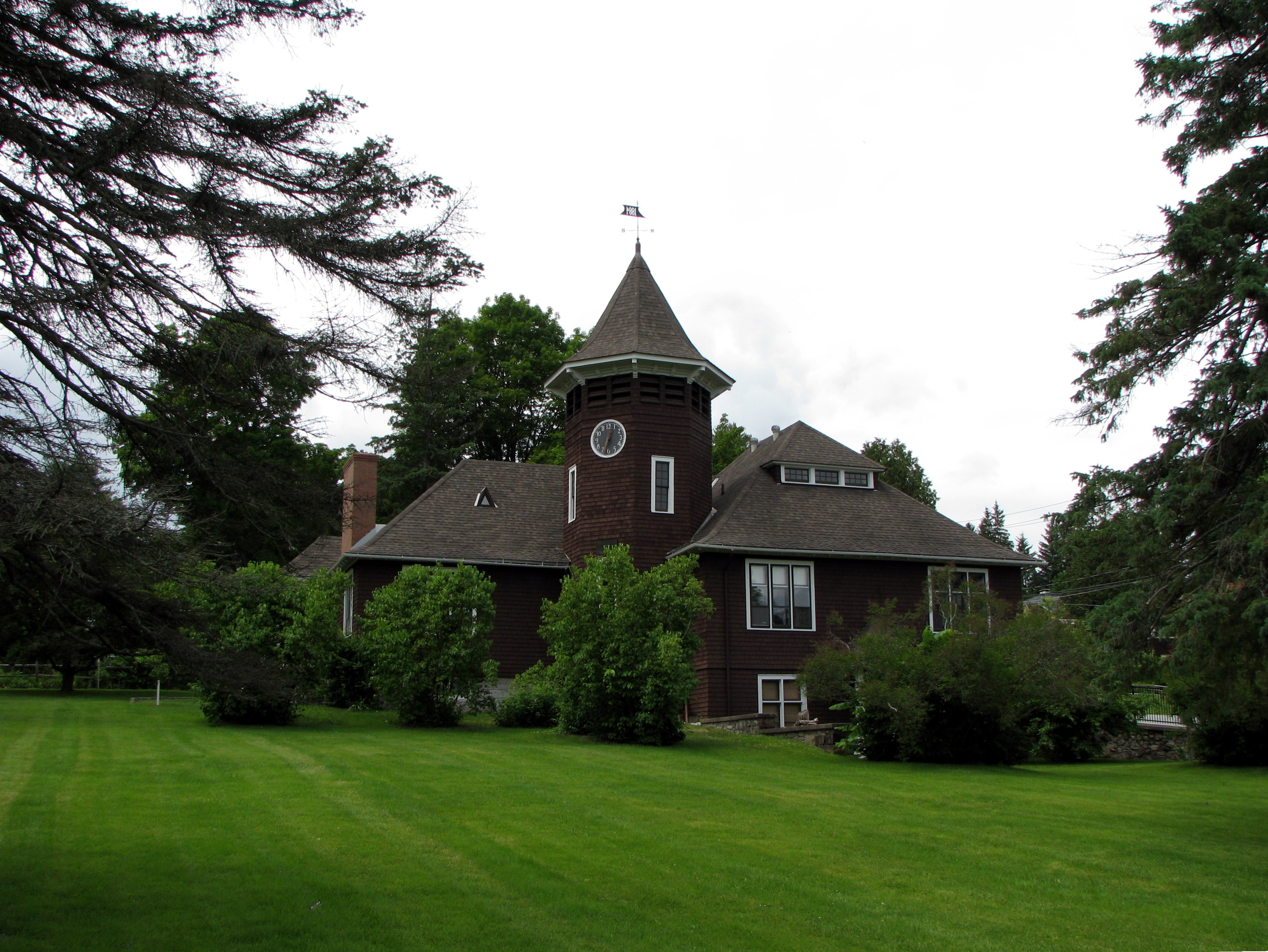
Westport Library, built 1887

As of the census of 2000, there were 1,362 people, 593 households, and 381 families residing in the town. (Note that since the census excludes summer residents, the figures in this section are for year-round residents only.) The population density was 23.3 inhabitants per square mile (9.0/km^{2}). There were 887 housing units at an average density of 15.2 per square mile (5.9/km^{2}). The racial makeup of the town was 97.7% White, 0.2% African American, 0.3% Native American, 0.7% Asian, 0.2% from other races, and 1.0% from two or more races. Hispanic or Latino of any race were 1.0% of the population.

There were 593 households, out of which 25.1% had children under the age of 18 living with them, 55.3% were married couples living together, 6.2% had a female householder with no husband present, and 35.6% were non-families. 29.3% of all households were made up of individuals, and 12.8% had someone living alone who was 65 years of age or older. The average household size was 2.30 and the average family size was 2.83.

In the town, the population was spread out, with 22.1% under the age of 18, 3.7% from 18 to 24, 24.5% from 25 to 44, 29.2% from 45 to 64, and 20.4% who were 65 years of age or older. The median age was 45 years. For every 100 females, there were 96.0 males. For every 100 females age 18 and over, there were 91.2 males.

The median income for a household in the town was $40,000, and the median income for a family was $49,917. Males had a median income of $31,042 versus $26,550 for females. The per capita income for the town was $22,063. About 5.2% of families and 7.7% of the population were below the poverty line, including 8.0% of those under age 18 and 5.0% of those age 65 or over.

== Education ==
Westport is served by the Bouquet Valley Central School. The Westport Central School merged with the Elizabethtown-Lewis Central School in 2019; high school students from Westport, Elizabethtown, and Lewis were relocated to the former Elizabethtown-Lewis School building, while elementary students moved into the former Westport campus. The new school district mascot is a Griffin (a combination of the previous two mascots of Lion and Eagle). Westport also has a branch of the Cornell University Cooperative Extension and is the mailing address of the Meadowmount School of Music (see above). Additionally, the Depot Theatre (above) runs a summer apprentice program for children ranging from elementary school to high school age.

== Public transport ==
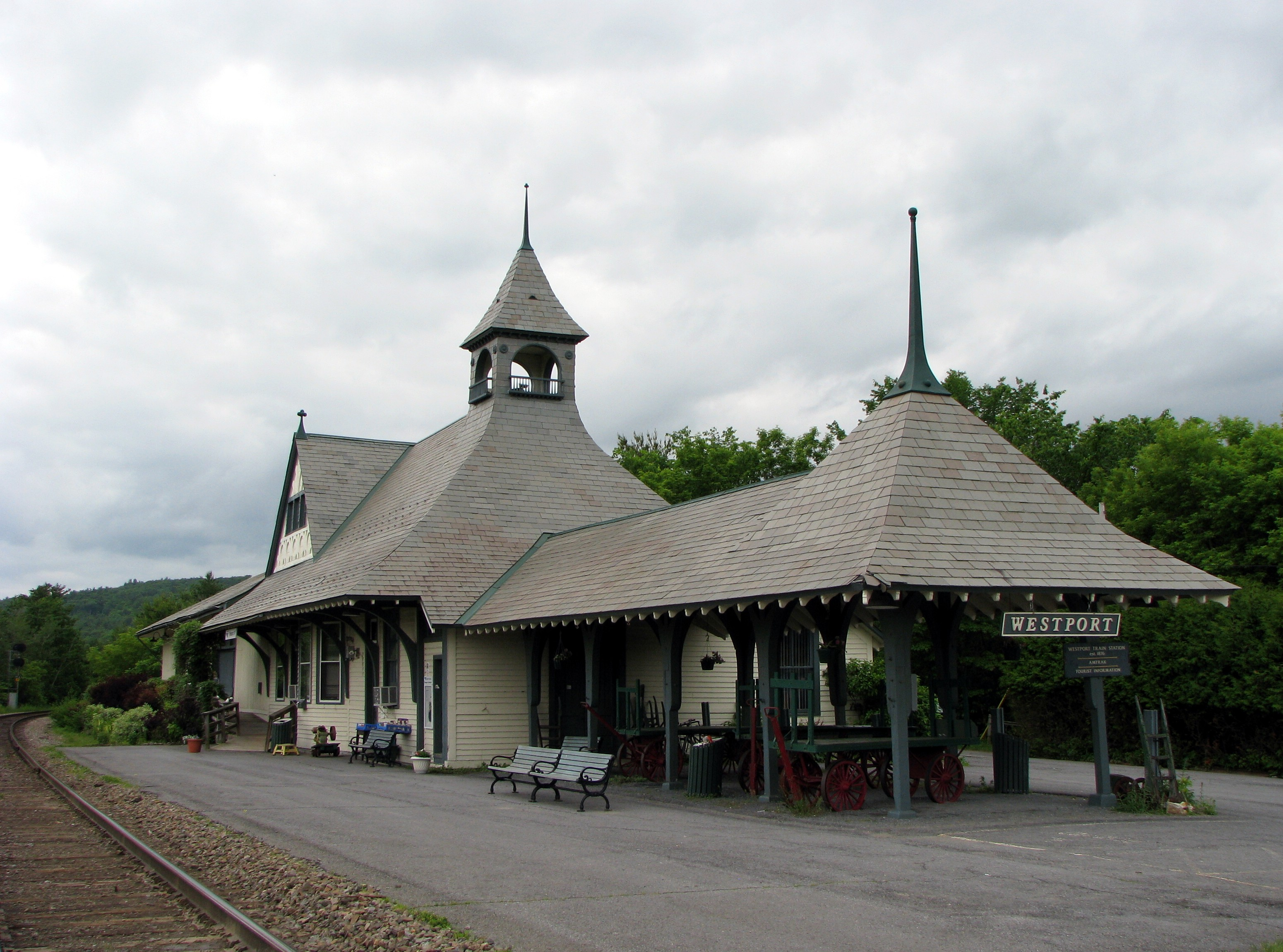
Westport train station, home to the Depot Theatre

Amtrak, the national passenger rail system, provides service to Westport, operating its Adirondack daily in both directions between Montreal and New York City. A bus connection is available from Westport to Lake Placid. The Amtrak station also houses the Depot Theatre.

On August 28, 2006, at approximately 6:45 p.m. local time, a Greyhound bus traveling from New York City to Montreal overturned on the Adirondack Northway in Westport after suffering a blown tire, killing five and injuring 48.

== Access to medical care ==
Westport is in a rural area in the Adirondack Park, and so most of its access to medical care is via the ferry operated by Lake Champlain Transportation Company. The nearest emergency department is Elizabethtown Community Hospital, a 25-bed rural hospital 9 miles (14 km) to the west, with eight doctors on its active medical staff. About 30 miles (48 km) by car to the northeast in Burlington, accessible via ferry, is the emergency department of University of Vermont Medical Center, a large, full-service hospital affiliated with the University of Vermont. During times when the ferry from Essex is not running, the nearest full-service emergency department is at CVPH Medical Center, in Plattsburgh, 41 miles (66 km) north of Westport. Slightly closer, though a slower drive over rural roads, is Porter Hospital in Middlebury, Vermont, accessible via the bridge at Crown Point.

Elizabethtown Community Hospital operates a small satellite clinic in Westport.

== Notable people ==
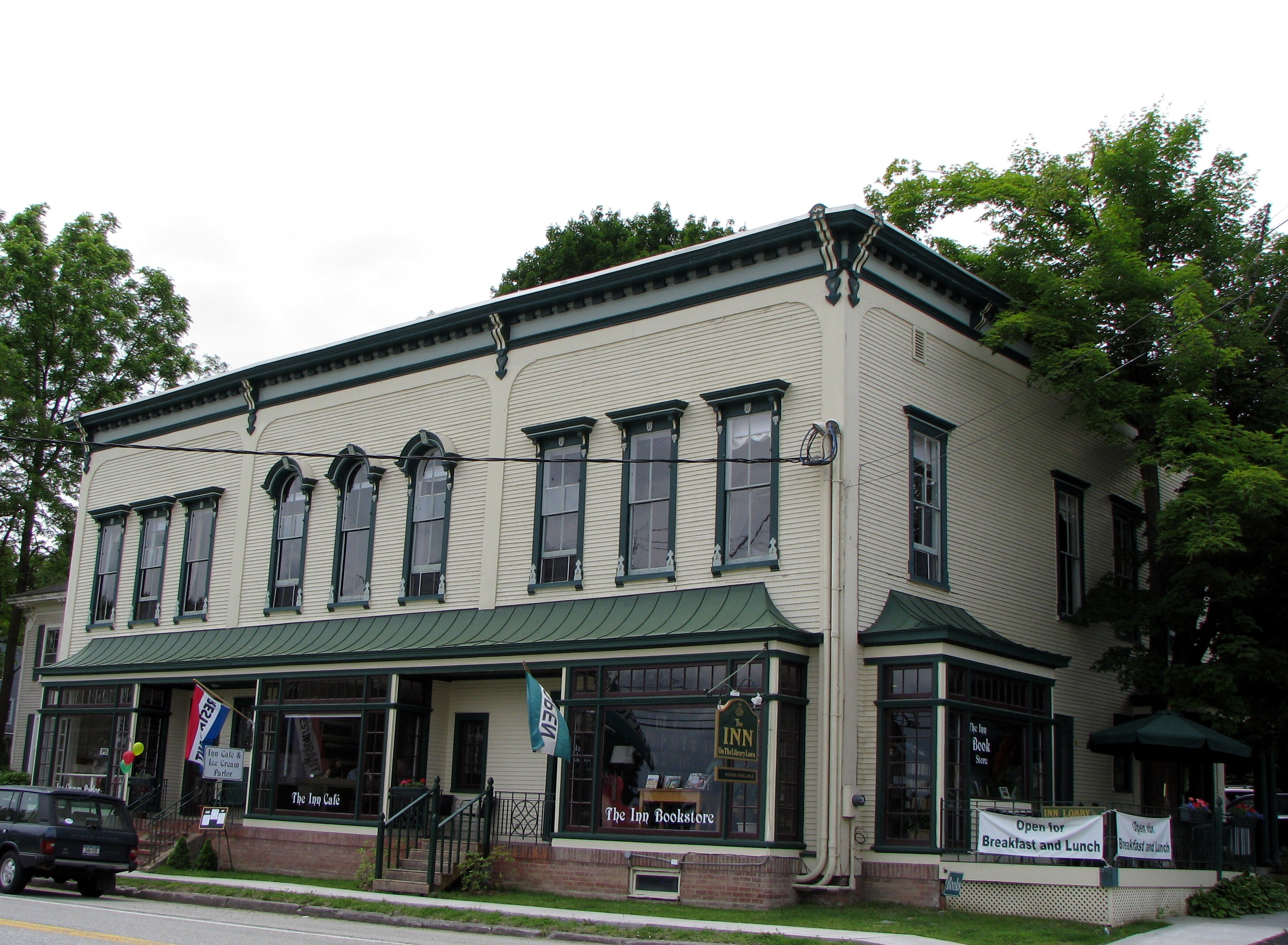
The Westport Inn Annex, 1877, now The Inn on the Library Lawn

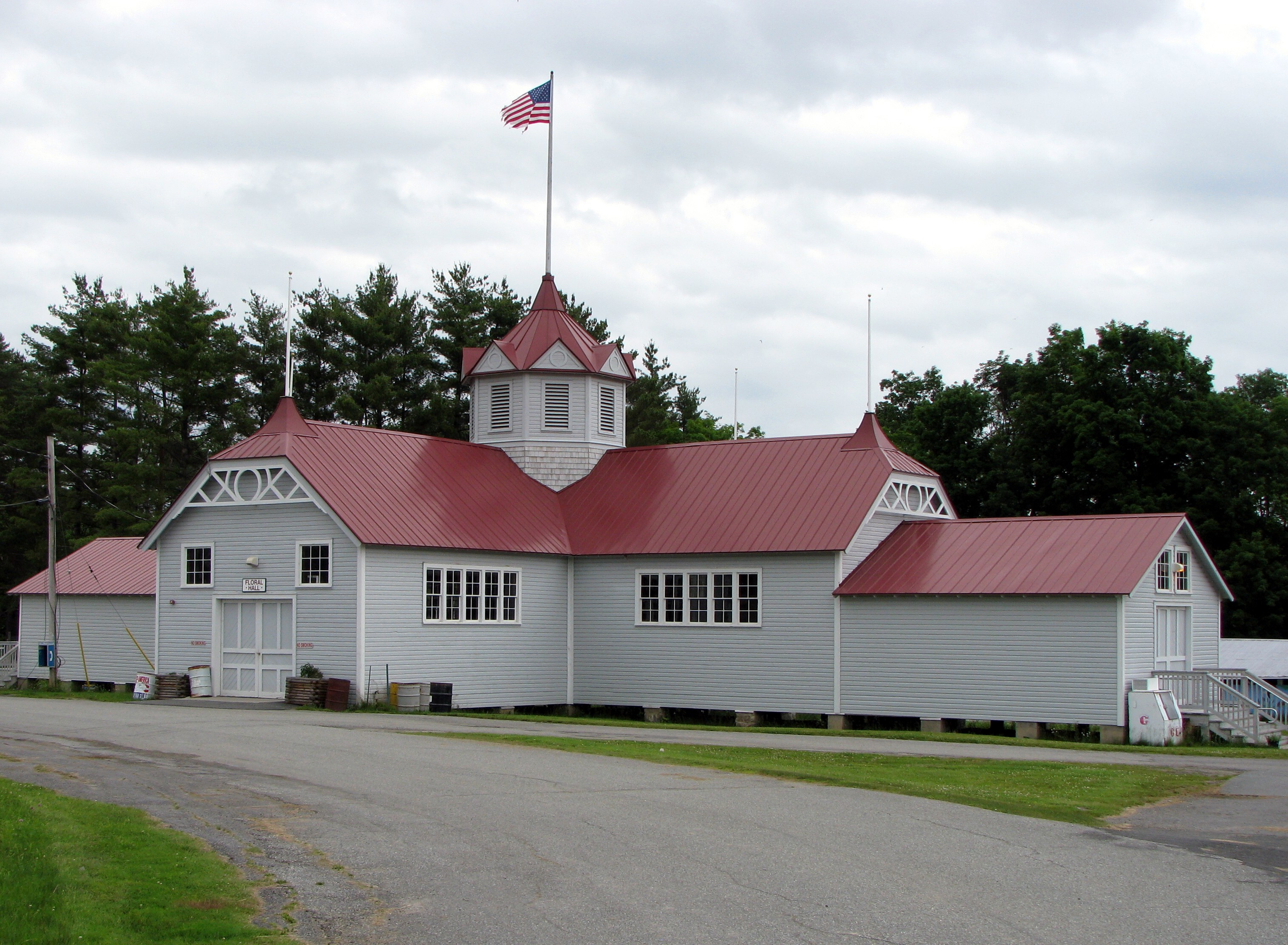
The Floral Hall at the historic Essex County Fairgrounds

Some notable Westport residents, past and present, include:

- Asa Aikens, Justice of the Vermont Supreme Court
- Edward Cornell (1944—2025), artist, painter, and theater director
- John T. Cutting (1844–1911), congressman from California
- Walter Damrosch (1862–1950), conductor of the New York Symphony Orchestra and music director of NBC Radio
- Dorothy DeLay (1917–2002), violin teacher, primarily at Juilliard, Meadowmount, and the Aspen Music Festival and School
- Ben Goldwasser (b. 1982), keyboardist for indie rock act MGMT
- David G. Hartwell (1941–2016), science fiction editor for Tor Books
- William Higby (1813–1887), congressman from California
- Henry Lee Higginson (1834–1919), founder of the Boston Symphony Orchestra
- John Kneller (1916-2009), English-American professor and fifth President of Brooklyn College
- Anne LaBastille (1935–2011), author and naturalist
- Alice Lee (civic leader) (1853–1943), businesswoman, owner of the Westport Inn at the end of the 1800s.
- Jeannette Augustus Marks (1875–1964), American professor at Mount Holyoke College
- Nathan Myrick (1822–1903), founder of La Crosse, Wisconsin
- John Eugene Osborne (1858–1943), governor of Wyoming and United States Assistant Secretary of State
- Case Patten (1874–1935), professional baseball player
- Cynthia Schira (b. 1934), textile artist
- William Wallace Barbour Sheldon (1836–1914), architectural engineer and pioneer of California
- Robert E. Sherwood (1896–1955), playwright, editor, and screenwriter
- Sally J. Smith, artist and former watercolorist
- Joseph Champlin Stone (1829–1902), congressman from Iowa
- Alexander "Sandy" Treadwell (b. 1946), American politician
- Ross Sterling Turner (1847–1915), painter and educator
- Mary Emma Woolley (1863–1947), president of Mount Holyoke College from 1900 to 1937

== Communities and locations in Westport ==
=== Inhabited locations ===
- Wadhams (formerly "Wadhams Mills" and "The Falls") – a hamlet just north of Westport on NY Route 22 at the junction of County Roads 8 and 10. Wadhams has its own free public library, volunteer fire department, and a hydroelectric dam on the Boquet River. All of these can be seen while standing on the bridge next to the Wadhams Free Library. Wadhams is best known locally for its farmers' market and Dogwood Bread Co. (formerly called Merrick's). The farmers' market takes place in front of the bakery. Wadhams is also known for its annual Strawberry Festival.
- Westport – The hamlet of Westport, formerly a village between 1907 and 1992. The community is located on the shore of Lake Champlain on NY-9N at the junction of NY-22.

=== Geographical locations ===
- Barber Point – A projection into Lake Champlain south of Bluff Point.
- Black River – A stream forming part of the western town line.
- Bluff Point – A projection into Lake Champlain, south of Westport village.
- Cole's Bay – A small bay of Lake Champlain, south of Northwest Bay.
- Furnace Point – A projection into North West Bay, north of Westport village.
- Hoisington Brook – A stream entering Lake Champlain at Westport village.
- Moore Point – A projection into Lake Champlain, south of Barber Point.
- Nichols Pond – A small lake near the western town line.
- North West Bay – A bay of Lake Champlain by Westport village.
- Split Rock Mountain – An elevation at the boundary between Westport and the town of Essex, known for its rattlesnake population.
- Stacy Brook – A stream entering Lake Champlain at Cole's Bay.

== See also ==
- Camp Dudley
- Lake Champlain
- Meadowmount School of Music
