= Essex County Fairgrounds =

- U.S. National Register of Historic Places
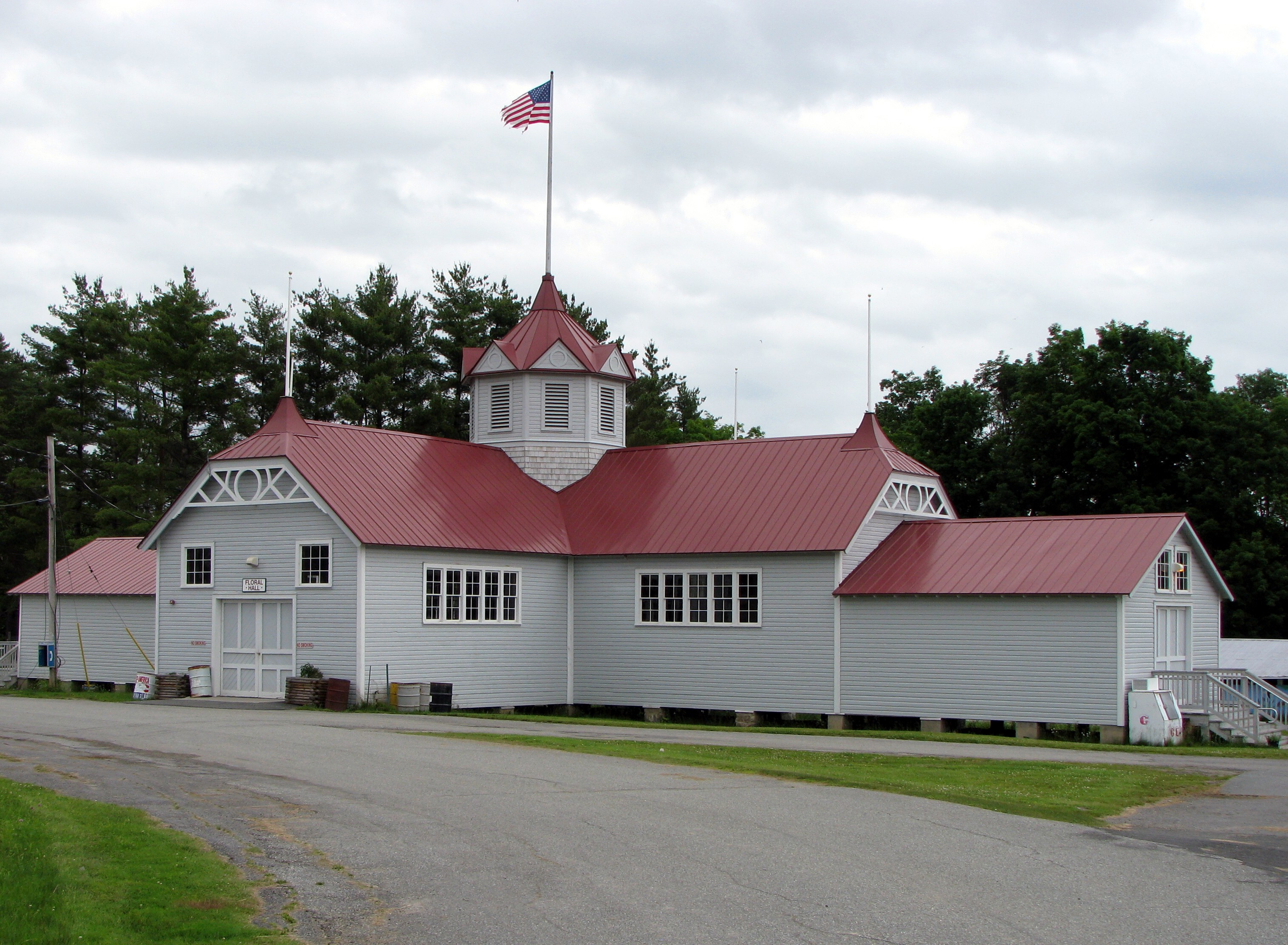
- Floral Hall, Essex County Fairgrounds, June 2009

- Location within New York Location within the United States
- Location: 3 Sisco St., Westport, New York
- Coordinates: 44°11′11″N 73°26′56″W
- Area: 30 acres (12 ha)
- Built: 1881
- Architectural style: Colonial Revival
- NRHP reference No.: 05000993
- Added to NRHP: September 7, 2005

Essex County Fairgrounds is a historic county fair located at Westport in Essex County, New York. The fairgrounds include 15 contributing buildings, one contributing site, and seven contributing structures. Four of these, the Grandstand, Judge's Stand, Floral Hall, and Racetrack, were among the original resources on the site when the fair opened in 1885. The Cooperative Extension Building was built about 1923 and is a two-story, rectangular, Colonial Revival style building with an octagonal cupola. It was listed on the National Register of Historic Places in 2005.
