= Alice Lee (civic leader) =

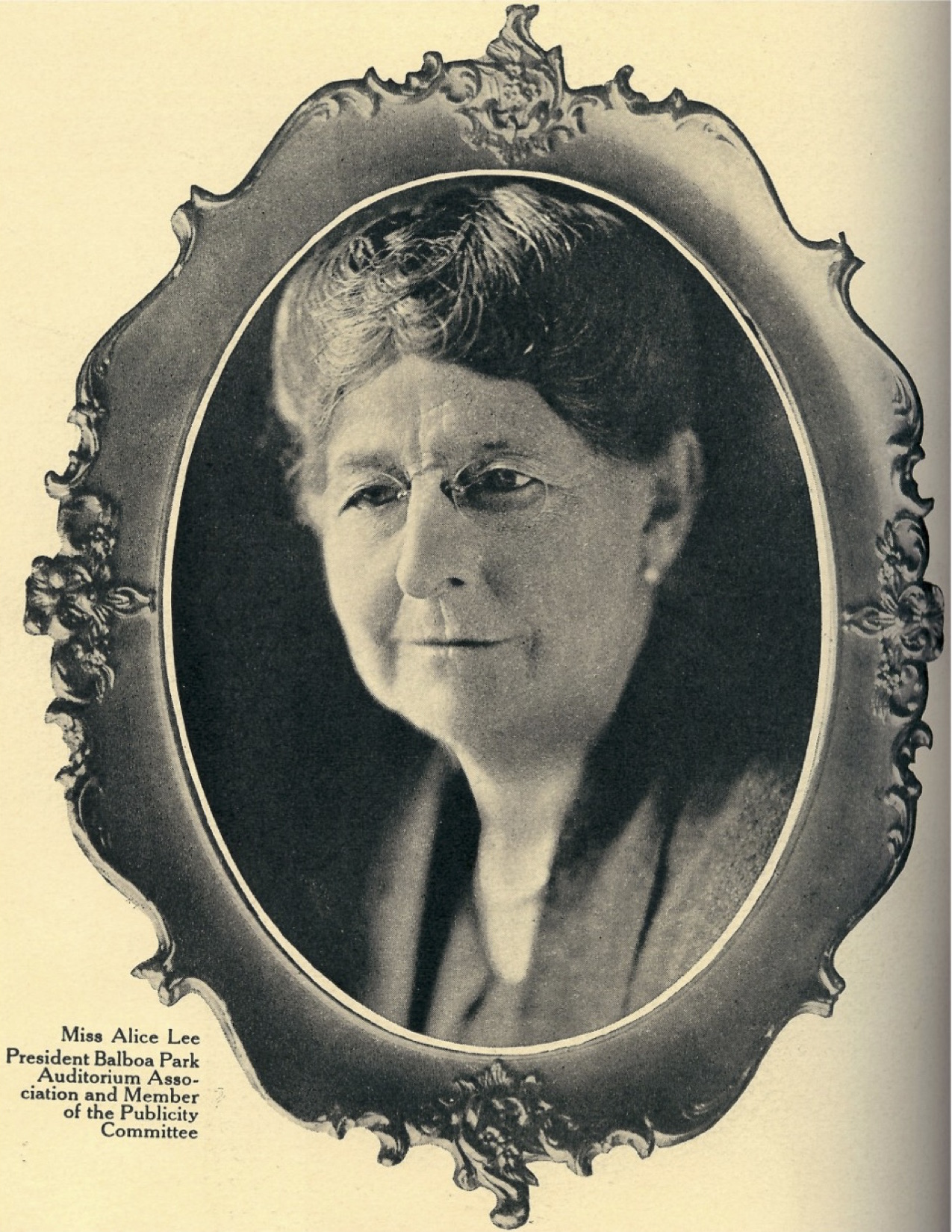
Photograph of Alice Lee

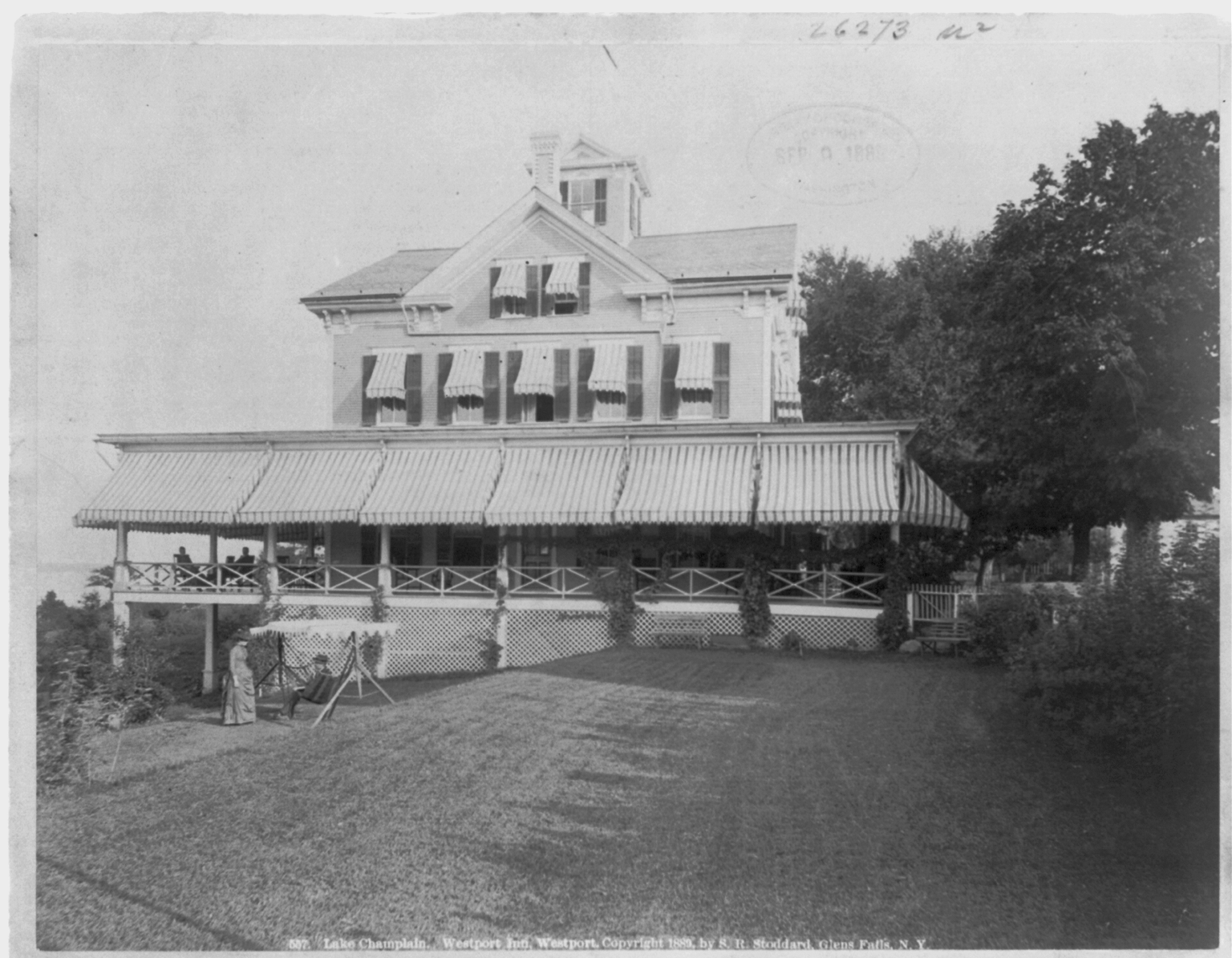
Photograph of Westport Inn in Westport, New York founded by Alice Lee

Alice Lee was born on May 27, 1853, in Westport, Essex County, New York, and died on February 18, 1943, in Cambridge, Middlesex County, Massachusetts, living approximately 89 years. As one of the most influential figures of the Social Movement, she had a same sex partner, Katherine Teats, who died in 1952. They were both aspects of the social environment by hosting two U.S. presidents and their wives at their San Diego, California, residence. Lee and Teats are, according to the San Diego Historical Resource Board, "one of the first documented domestic partnerships in San Diego," being documented living together in various Census records; in the 1930 Census, Lee was the Head of Household and Teats was Partner (and not Lodger while often used in such cases). Together they owned various real estate properties in San Diego, had an active civic and social life, and were accepted as a couple.

Lee is viewed as a “Civic Leader in San Diego Union, the Ticonderoga Sentinel, the Boston Globe, and Women of the West: A Series of Biographical Sketches of Living Eminent Women in the Eleven Western States of the United States of America”.

Lee died on February 18, 1943.

== Early life and education ==
Alice Lee was born on May 27, 1853, in Westport, New York, the daughter of Colonel Francis L. Lee (1823-1886) and Sarah Mary Anne Wilson. She was the second cousin of Theodore Roosevelt's wife, Alice Hathaway Lee.

== Mid Adulthood ==
During the late 1880s, Lee became the owner of Marvin House in Westport, New York. The Westport Inn remained until 1966, 80 years after it was opened.

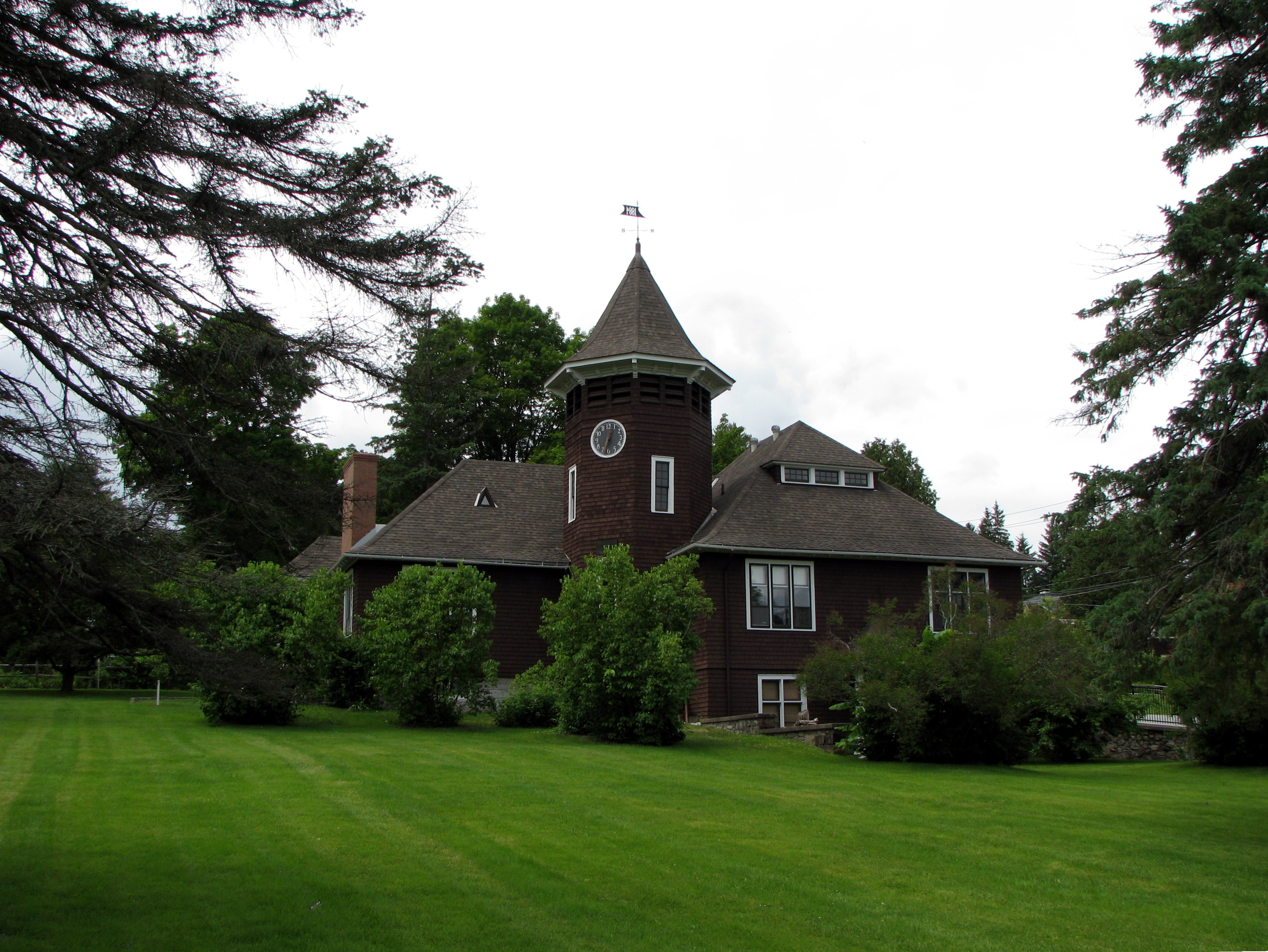
Westport Library that Alice Lee helped fund

Westport Library remains in its original structure due to restrictions that granted it establishment in the first place.

== Late Adulthood ==
In 1902 Lee moved to San Diego to find a better climate for her health problems. When she first moved to San Diego she met the Marston family, who were already involved in the Progressive movement. Lee was a supporter of the Progressive movement, and other than Theodore Roosevelt, she was friends with Florence Nightingale, Ralph Waldo Emerson and the family of Amos Bronson Alcott. Lee joined the movement through the Marston family and through Theodore Roosevelt’s role in the Progressive Party. She fought for social and political reform. She encouraged women to vote by campaigning for Franklin Roosevelt in 1932. She represented the California Progressive Party at the National Convention held in Chicago, Illinois after they noticed her contributions. By campaigning for Franklin Roosevelt in 1932 she would help women's suffrage and increase women's political rights.

In San Diego Lee was a member of First Unitarian Church, Wednesday Club, Civic Committee of the Chamber of Commerce, and other groups for cultural and civic development.

She was also President of the San Diego Museum, the Balboa Park Auditorium Association, and the Balboa Park Commission. She was Honorary Director of the Women's Civic Center and Director of the Natural History Museum.

She founded the Open Forum, a group that was devoted to discuss social, political, and international issues. In 1935 the Open Forum was "oldest continuous non-legislative forum of free public discussion in the United States" and it closed in the 1970s.

She led the "Save the Beaches" campaign whose purpose was to open to public beaches in Southern California (especially San Diego). This campaign was against oil companies who had taken control of said beaches. Lee was also instrumental in developing the public playground system. The public playground system kept kids from developing bad habits and instead gave them somewhere to socialize in a healthy manner.

== Personal life & LGBTQ+ Significance ==
Lee and her partner Katherine Teats, shared a home on Seventh Avenue in San Diego from 1902 till Alice's death in 1943, when Katherine continued in their home by herself. Katherine's grand niece, according to San Diego Magazine, said, "the family lore considered the pair to be lesbians."

Together, they lived in the main house of the residence and rented the other two homes on the property. They hosted accuatences like the wife of Grover Cleveland, Frances Folsom Cleveland Preston, and Theodore Roosevelt's, and Alice Hathaway Lee Roosevelt whom they were friends with. Because of these interactions they were also continuous guests at the White House. Theodore Roosevelt and his wife Alice Hathaway Lee Roosevelt, and Frances Folsom Cleveland Preston were often guests at Lee's San Diego home at 7th Ave.

In 1905 they commissioned Hazel Wood Waterman, with the supervision of Irving Gill, to build three residences in San Diego, Alice Lee Residence at 3574 7th Ave, Katherine Teats Cottage at 3560 7th Ave and Alice Lee Cottage at 3578 7th Ave. The compound shared a garden designed by botanist and landscape architect Kate Sessions. Lee and Teats lived in the main house and used the other two for rentals. Teats continued to live at Teats Cottage, a Prairie-style house which Lee granted to her in 1906, until she died in 1952. Their residences are now labeled as historical landmarks.
