= Cynthia Schira =

American textile artist

Cynthia Schira (born 1934) is an American textile artist and former university professor. Her work is represented in the collections of many major public museums.

== Early life and education ==
Schira was born Cynthia Jones in June 1934 in Pittsfield, Massachusetts. She was the daughter of a manager at the Corn Exchange Bank in New York City. The family lived in Bronxville, New York until his death when Cynthia was nine, after which they moved to be near her mother's family in Pittsfield. When Schira told her mother she intended to go to art school, her mother sent her to Norman Rockwell—who lived in nearby Stockbridge at the time—to talk her out of the idea. Instead, Rockwell encouraged her to do what she wanted.

In 1952, Schira entered Rhode Island School of Design (RISD) in Providence, Rhode Island with scholarships from the Daughters of the American Revolution, the Metallurgical Society of New York, and Textron among others, including one that stipulated that she major in textiles. She graduated from RISD with a bachelor's degree in 1956. From 1956 to 1957, she studied in Aubusson, France at L'Ecole D'Art Decoratif. She also studied printed textiles for a time in Baroda, India. She earned an MFA in weaving from the University of Kansas in 1967. Her masters' thesis focused on Peruvian textiles.

== Career ==
In her early career, Schira experimented with ikat weaving and with incorporating strips of aluminum into the warp of her works. In the 1970s, she began incorporating pre-dyed tapes and rayon ribbon into her work. In her body of work titled Supplementary Weft, she inserts narrow strips of cloth such as bandages and ribbons into the structure of the weaving to create depth and color. In a later series titled Complementary Warps, she used a complicated triple weave with three weaves and one weft. Schira's art combines traditional and modern influences. Though she uses non-traditional materials, she works in "the traditional technique of flat tapestry hanging". Schira's work also draws from the various textile traditions she has seen on her travels around the world. According to the American Craft Council, "[s]he established a modern context for weaving while staying true to traditions and maintaining a provocative physicality."

She was an early adopter of computer weaving programs and the Jacquard loom, and her recent work has often referenced the digital world. In 1983 Schira purchased a loom with a 32-harness system and a simple computer using funds from the National Endowment for the Arts Craftsman's Fellowship. In 1994 a software program became available with which she created complex graphic arrangements resembling graffiti and blocks of computer code. While using this technology for ease of execution, she continued to use experimental methods such as painting dye onto her warp threads and adding structural media into her weave.

Schira was on the faculty of the University of Kansas from 1976 to 1999. Her textiles have been inspired by the landscape of the Kansas plains, as well as training and experience in textiles centers around the world.

== Personal life ==
Schira was married for 52 years to Richard Schira, a professor emeritus of art at the University of Kansas, who died in 2008. The couple had two children. Schira lives and works in Westport, New York.

== Awards ==
(All award information from the ACC Library artist file)

- Textron Fellowship, 1956–57
- Louis Comfort Tiffany Fellowship, 1966–67
- National Endowment of the Arts Craftsman's Fellowship 1974, 1983
- Purchase Award, Joslyn Art Museum, Omaha, Nebraska, 1961
- Third prize for rugs, Midwest Weaver's Conference, Columbia, Missouri, 1967
- Merit Award and Purchase, Southwest Craftsmen, Dallas, Texas, 1968
- Weaving Award, South Central Craftsmen, ACC, Central City, Colorado, 1969
- Purchase Award, "Women '71," Northern Illinois University, DeKalb, Illinois, 1971
- Kansas Designer, Craftsman Exhibit, University of Kansas, 1963, 1964, 1967, 1968, 1969, 1970
- National Endowment for the Arts Artist Fellowship Award, 1982
- Rhode Island School of Design, Honorary Doctorate of Fine Arts, 1989
- Kansas Arts Commission, Craftsman's Fellowship, 1990
- American Craft Council College of Fellows, 1992
- American Craft Council Gold Medalist, 2000
- New York Foundation for the Arts Artist's Fellowship, 2005
- Distinguished Educator Award, James Renwick Alliance, Smithsonian, 2006

== Collections ==
- Cooper Hewitt, Smithsonian Design Museum
- Metropolitan Museum of Art
- Smithsonian American Art Museum
- Spencer Museum of Art, Lawrence, KS
