= First Congregational Church and Cemetery =

Historic church in New York, United States

- U.S. National Register of Historic Places
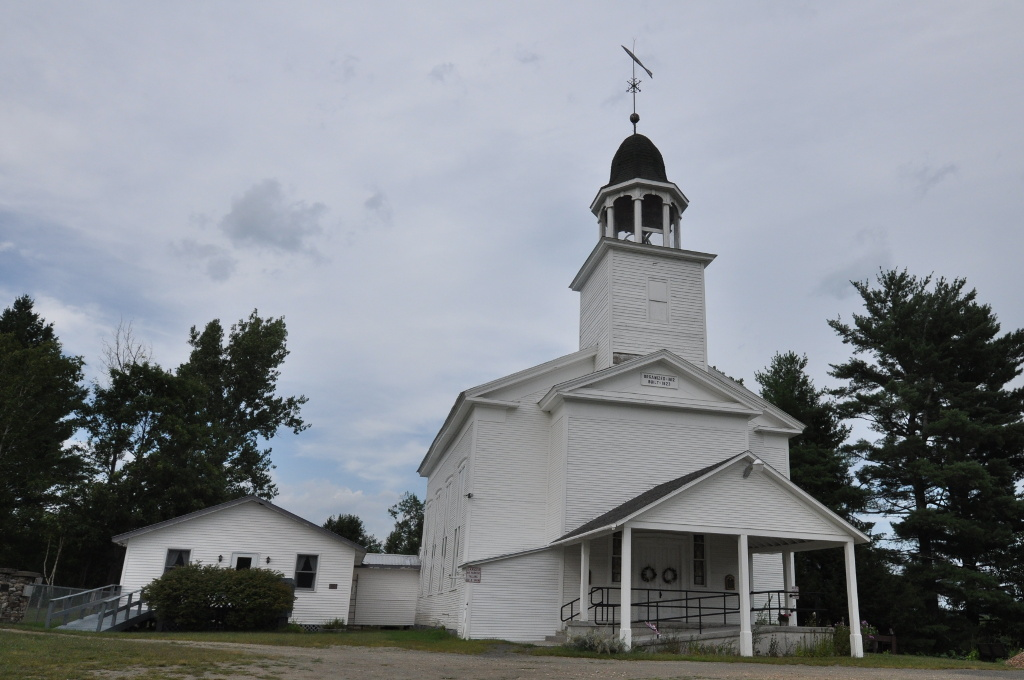

- Location within New York Location within the United States
- Location: US 9 at Elizabethtown–Lewis Road, Lewis, New York
- Coordinates: 44°16′40″N 73°34′5″W
- Area: 8.6 acres (3.5 ha)
- Built: 1812
- Architectural style: Early-late 19th-century vernacular
- NRHP reference No.: 04001457
- Added to NRHP: January 5, 2005

First Congregational Church and Cemetery is a historic Congregational church and cemetery on US 9 at Elizabethtown-Lewis Road in Lewis, Essex County, New York.

According to a church historian (Mrs. Milford Lee), a group of residents met in Elizabethtown on 12 June 1812 to organize a local Congregational church. Those present included Rev. Cyrus Comstock and Rev. Burbank, as well as fourteen local residents who became members of the church. The church was built between 1823 and 1834 and slightly modified in the late 19th century. It is a rectangular, gable roofed frame building sheathed in clapboard siding. It features a large, central bell tower with an elegant Federal style belfry topped by a bell cast roof. Adjacent to the church is the 7.6-acre (3.1 ha) village cemetery established in the 1820s and still in use today. Among those laid to rest in its cemetery is the suffragist Inez Milholland.

The church became part of the larger United Church of Christ in February 1961.

It was listed on the National Register of Historic Places in 2005.
