= Ross Sterling Turner =

American painter and educator (1847–1915)

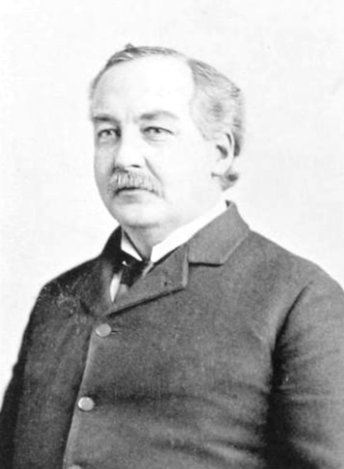
- Born: June 29, 1847; Westport, New York, US
- Died: February 15, 1915 (aged 67); Nassau, Bahamas
- Resting place: Mount Auburn Cemetery
- Education: Munich Academy
- Known for: Painting
- Movement: American Impressionism

Ross Sterling Turner (June 29, 1847 – February 12, 1915) was an American painter and educator from Massachusetts. He was affiliated with the American Impressionist movement. Turner's artworks are held at the Boston Museum of Fine Arts, Boston Public Library, Denver Art Museum, Fogg Museum, Peabody Museum of Salem, Smithsonian American Art Museum, Worcester Art Museum, and other institutions.

== Life and career ==
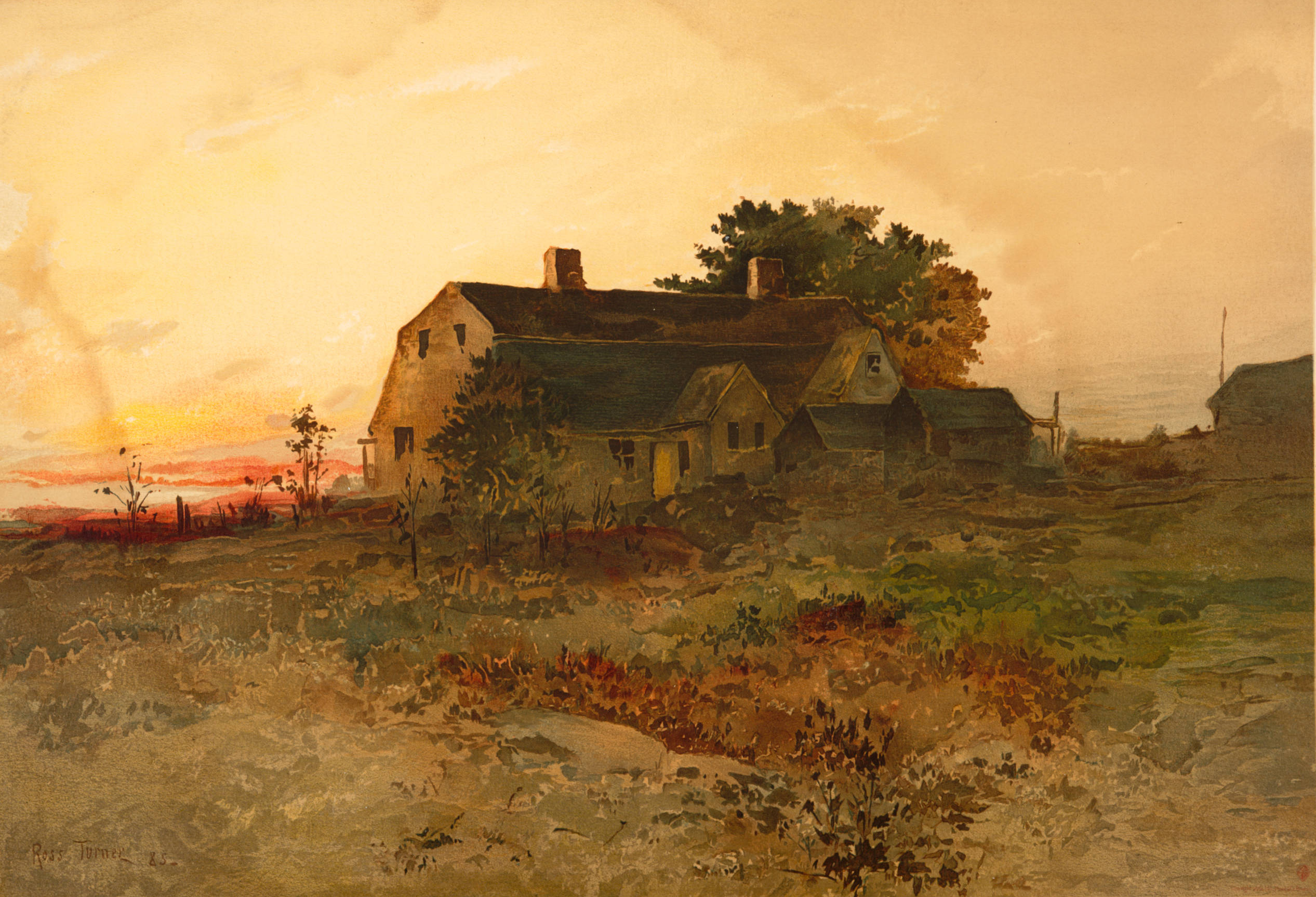
Lithograph entitled "Sunset in New England" (1885) by Ross Turner

Turner was born on June 29, 1847, in Westport, New York. In 1862, he and his family moved to Alexandria, Virginia, where he found employment as a mechanical draftsman at the United States Patent Office. In 1876, he traveled to Europe, visiting Paris and then studying at the Munich Academy (he may not have officially enrolled in classes), where he befriended American painters William Merritt Chase and Frank Duveneck and Greek painter Constantin Bolonachi. Circa 1879, he traveled to Florence, Rome, and Venice to study the Old Masters and begin experimenting with light and color.

Turner returned to the United States in 1883 and settled in Boston, where he exhibited his watercolors and oils at the Boston Art Club and the Doll & Richards art gallery on Newbury Street. He mingled in the social circles of Childe Hassam and Celia Thaxter and married Louise Blaney, sister of artist Dwight Blaney, in 1885. He moved to Salem but taught art at his Boston studio until 1903. He taught at the Massachusetts Institute of Technology (1884–85, 1886–1914), Massachusetts Normal Art School (from 1909), and Grundmann Studios. He traveled widely in search of artistic inspiration, visiting the Caribbean, Mexico, and Venice. He died in Nassau, the Bahamas, on February 15, 1915, at the age of 67. He was buried at Boston's Mount Auburn Cemetery.

== Legacy ==
Turner is known for his impressionist watercolors of gardens, landscapes, and seascapes. His artwork is held at the Boston Museum of Fine Arts, Boston Public Library, Denver Art Museum, Fogg Museum, Los Angeles County Museum of Art, Peabody Museum of Salem, Smithsonian American Art Museum, Worcester Art Museum, and other institutions.
