= Lake View Grange No. 970 =

- U.S. National Register of Historic Places
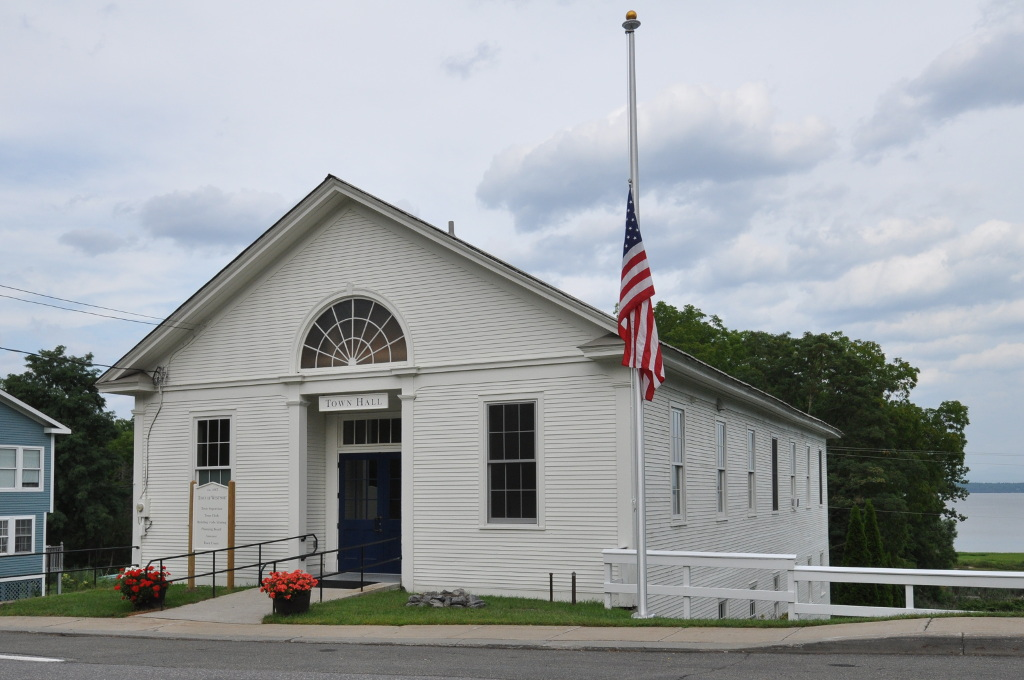

- Location within New York Location within the United States
- Location: 22 Champlain Ave., Westport, New York
- Coordinates: 44°11′09″N 73°26′15″W
- Area: 0.17 acres (0.069 ha)
- Built: 1928
- Built by: Gough, Vern
- Architectural style: Colonial Revival
- NRHP reference No.: 13000626
- Added to NRHP: August 27, 2013

Lake View Grange No. 970, also known as the Westport Town Offices and Depew's Roller Rink, is a historic Grange building located at Westport, Essex County, New York. It was built about 1920, and is a two-story, gable front frame building with Colonial Revival style design elements. It is built into a banked site and measures 36 feet by 90 feet. It housed a local Grange chapter from its construction until about 1940; became a roller rink in the 1950s, then a chapter of the American Legion; and after 1971, the Westport town and village offices.

It was added to the National Register of Historic Places in 2013.
