= Gold panning =

Form of placer mining

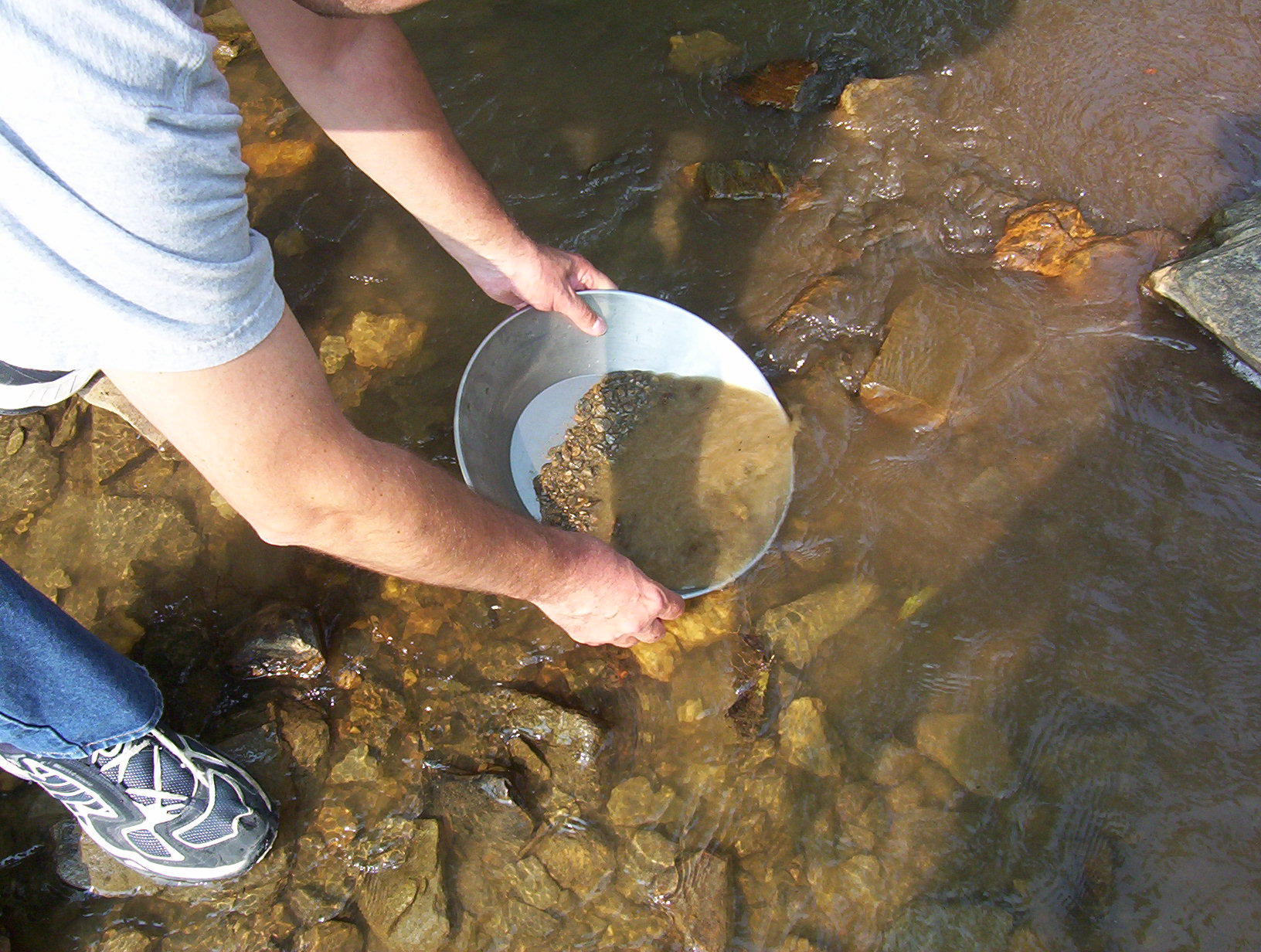
Panning for gold in a creek bed

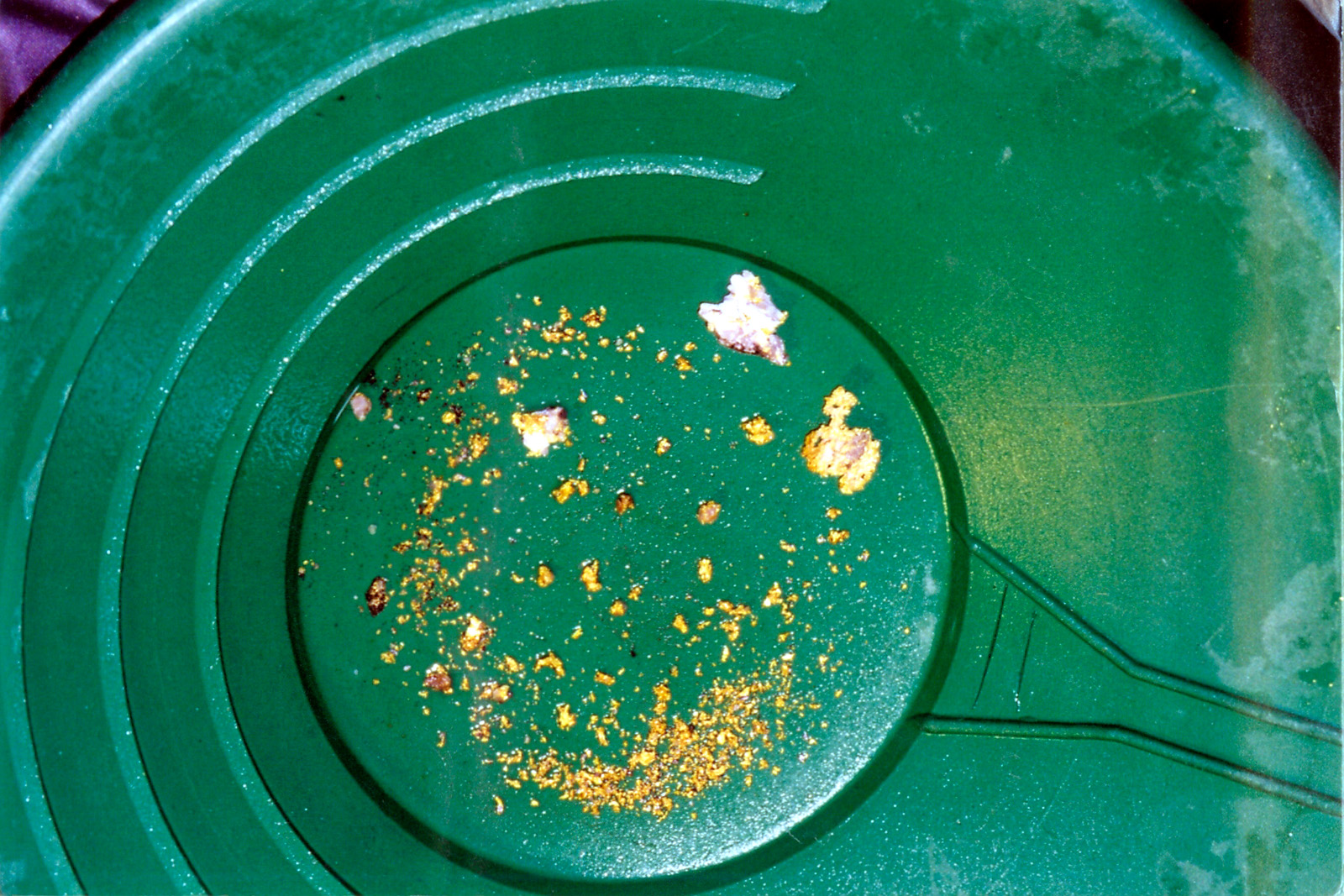
Gold in the pan, Alaska

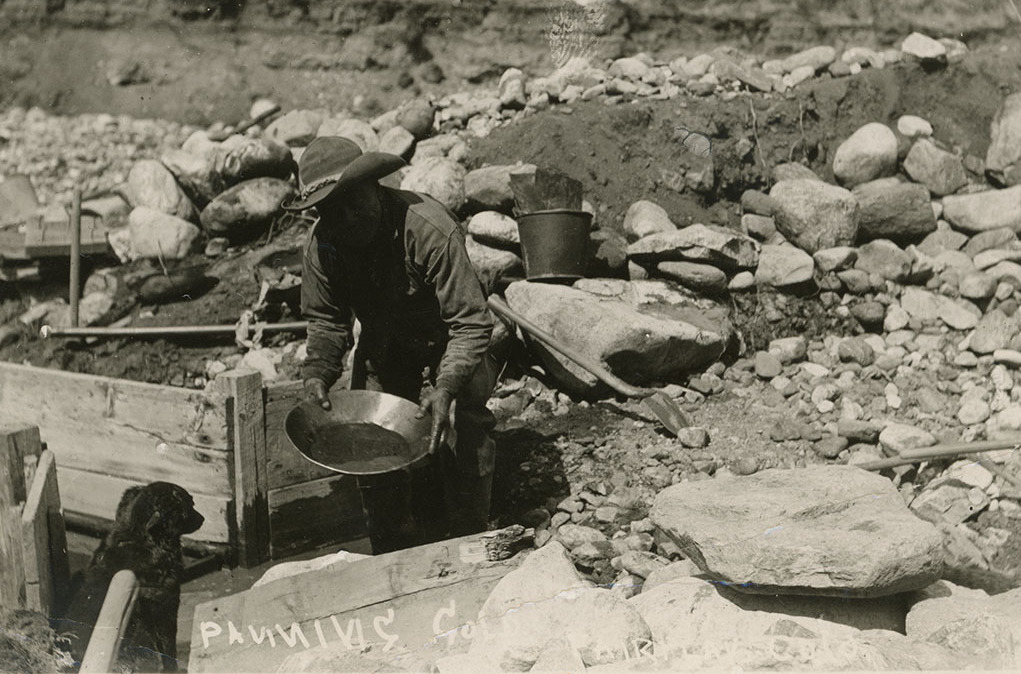
Man gold panning in Fairplay, Colorado early 1900s with dog

Gold panning, or simply panning, is a form of placer mining and traditional mining that extracts gold from a placer deposit using a pan. The process is one of the simplest ways to extract gold, and is popular with geology enthusiasts especially because of its low cost and relative simplicity.

The first recorded instances of placer mining are from ancient Rome, where gold and other precious metals were extracted from streams and mountainsides using sluices and panning (ruina montium).

However, the productivity rate is comparatively smaller compared to other methods such as the rocker box or large extractors, such as those used at the Super Pit gold mine, in Kalgoorlie, Western Australia, which has led to panning being largely replaced in the commercial market.

== Process ==
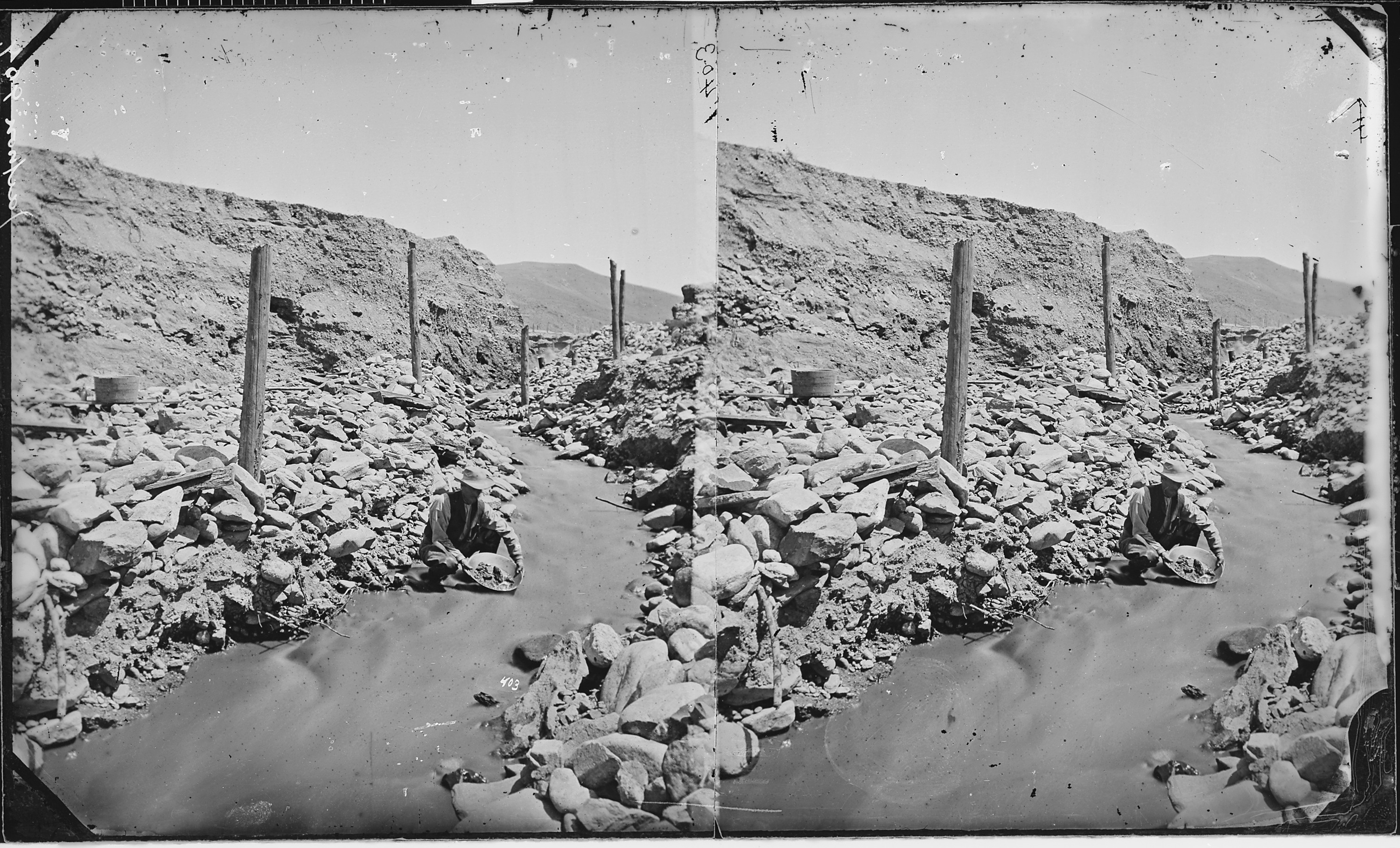
"Panning out" — Stereoscopic view of print taken by the U.S. Geological and Geographic Survey of the Territories, c. 1874–1879.

Gold panning is a simple process. Once a suitable placer deposit is located, some alluvial deposits are scooped into a pan, where they are then wetted and loosed from attached soils by soaking, fingering, and aggressive agitation in water. This is called stratification, which helps dense materials, like gold, sink to the bottom of the pan. Materials with low specific gravity will rise upward, allowing these to be washed out of the pan, whereas materials with higher specific gravity, sinking to the bottom of the sediment during stratification, will remain in the pan allowing examination and collection by the prospector. These dense materials usually consist of black sand with whatever stones or dense metal particles that may be found in the deposit that is used for source material.

Because of the stratification process, gold panning is used in the assaying process in which portions of paydirt (processed mining material) is analyzed for the amount of gold contained (parts per ton). Assaying is an important aspect of mining, especially for large commercial mining operations. Although gold panning is considered by many an outdoor hobby, it is still a source of income for many who live in parts of Alaska.

While an effective method with certain kinds of deposits, and essential for prospecting, even skilled panners can only work a limited amount of material, significantly less than the other methods which have replaced it in larger operation. Pans remain in use in places where there is limited capital or infrastructure, as well as in recreational gold mining. In many situations, gold panning typically turns up fine gold dust. Nuggets and considerable amounts of dust are occasionally found. Panning for gold can be used to locate the parent gold veins which are the source of most placer deposits.

== Pans ==
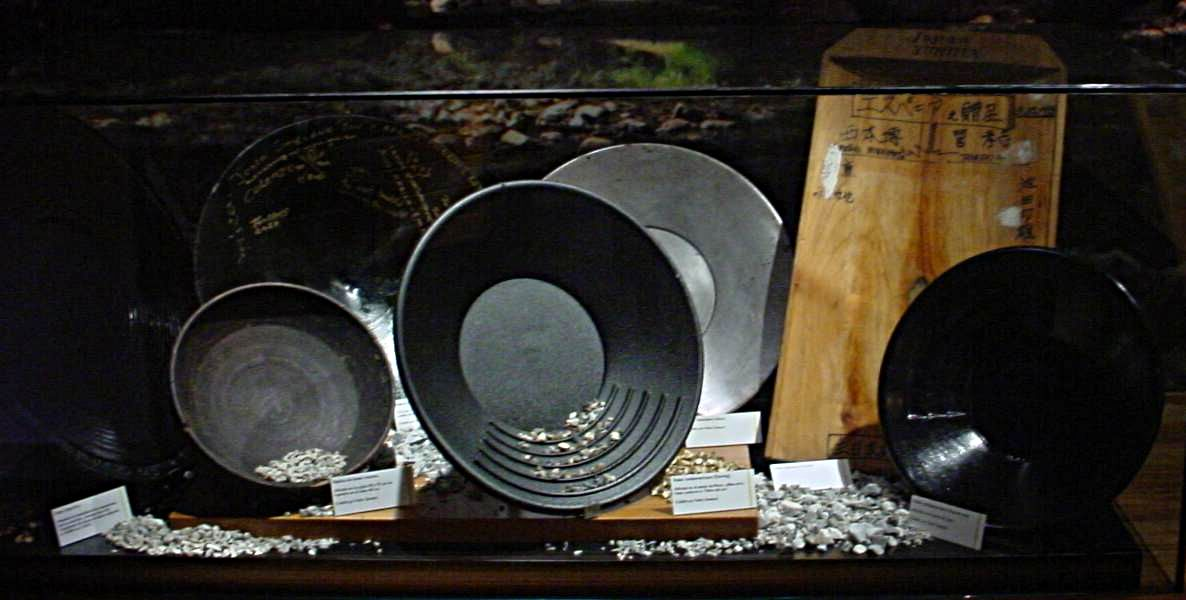
Various designs of gold pans from around the world

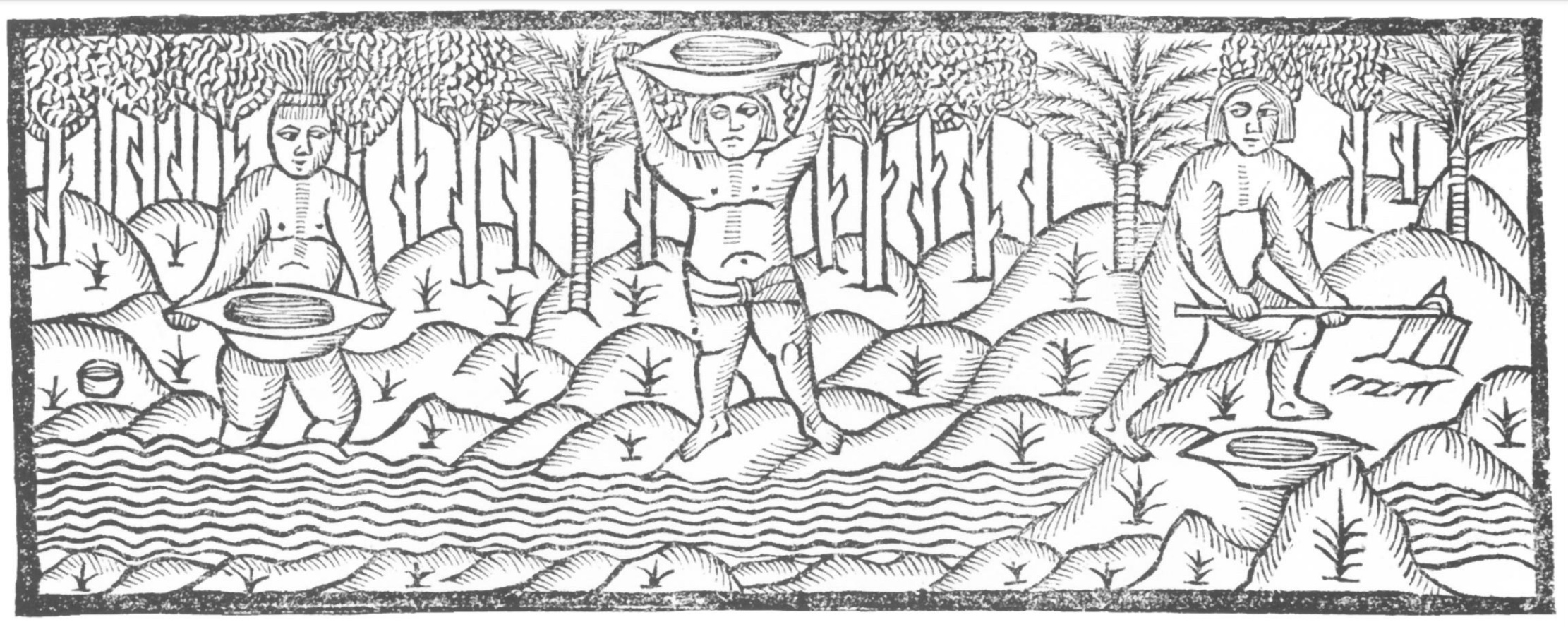
Panning Gold in New Spain, Early Colonial Period, c. 1535. The pans appear to be bateas.

Gold pans of various designs have been developed over the years, the common features being a means for trapping the heavy materials during agitation, or for easily removing them at the end of the process. Some are intended for use with mercury, include screens, sharp corners for breaking ice, are non-round, or are even designed for use "with or without water". Edward Otho Cresap Ord, II, a former Army officer and co-owner of several mines, patented several pan designs including designs for use with mercury or dry.

Pans are measured by their diameter in inches or centimeters. Common sizes of gold pans today range between 10 and 17 inches (25 and 43 cm), with 14 inches (36 cm) being the most used size. The sides are generally angled between 30° and 45°.

Pans are manufactured in both metal and high-impact plastic. Russia iron or heavy gauge steel pans are traditionally used. Steel pans are heavier and stronger than plastic pans. Some are made of lightweight alloys for structural stability. Plastic gold pans resist rust, acid and corrosion, and most are designed with moulded riffles along one side of the pan. Of the plastic gold pans, green and red ones are usually preferred among prospectors, as both the gold and the black sand stands out in the bottom of the pan, although many also opt for black pans instead to easily identify gold deposits.

The batea, Spanish for "gold pan", is a particular variant of gold pan. Traditionally made of a solid piece of wood, it may also be made of metal. Bateas are used in areas where there is less water available for use than with traditional gold pans, such as Mexico and South America, where it was introduced by the Spanish. Bateas are larger than other gold pans, being closer to half a meter (20 inches) in diameter.

=== Yuri-ita ===
The yuri-ita (揺り板), Japanese for "rocking plate" is a traditional wooden gold pan used in Japan. Unlike other gold pans, it is rectangular in shape with a concave cross section and is sealed off at one end with the other end open. As the Japanese name implies, the gold is panned with a rocking motion.

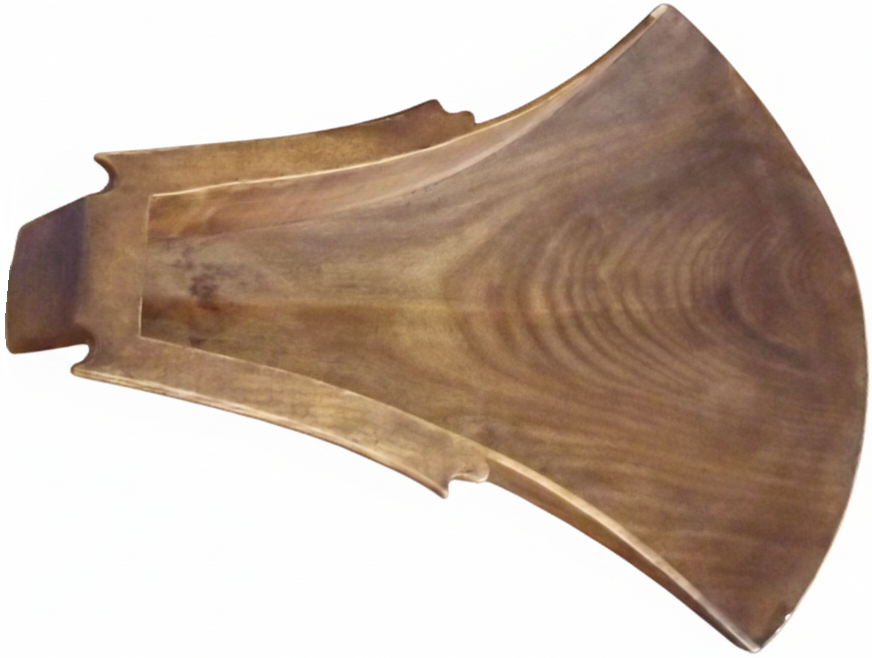
Romanian șaitroc

=== Șaitroc ===
The șaitroc, a combination of the German words "scheiden" (to separate, divide) and "Trog" (trough, bin, channel), is a traditional wooden pan, used in Transylvania, Romania, for panning gold, and for separating gold from crushed ore.
