= Lewis, Essex County, New York =

Town in Essex County, New York, US

Lewis, New York
- Town
- Location in Essex County and the state of New York
- Coordinates: 44°16′58″N 73°32′44″W
- Country: United States
- State: New York
- County: Essex

Government
  - Type: Town Council
  - Town Supervisor: James W. Monty (R)
  - Town Council: Members' List: • John Blades; • Stephen Denton Jr.; • Lanita Canavan; • Terry Pulsifer Jr.

Area
  - Total: 85.0 sq mi (220.1 km^{2})
  - Land: 84.8 sq mi (219.6 km^{2})
  - Water: 0.19 sq mi (0.5 km^{2})
- Elevation: 679 ft (207 m)

Population (2020)
  - Total: 1,293
  - Density: 16/sq mi (6.3/km^{2})
- Time zone: UTC-5 (Eastern (EST))
  - Summer (DST): UTC-4 (EDT)
- ZIP Codes: 12950 (Lewis); 12932 (Elizabethtown); 12993 (Westport)
- Area code: 518
- FIPS code: 36-42114
- GNIS feature ID: 0979143
- Website: www.townoflewisecny.gov

There is another Town of Lewis in Lewis County, New York.

Lewis is a town in Essex County, New York, United States. The population was 1,382 at the 2010 census. The town is named after Morgan Lewis, the governor of New York at the time the town was established.

The town is in the northeastern quadrant of the county. It is 30 miles (48 km) southwest of Burlington, Vermont, 32 miles (51 km) south of Plattsburgh, 94 miles (151 km) south of Montreal, Quebec, and 131 miles (211 km) north of Albany.

== History ==
Settlement began before 1798 near Lewis village.

The town of Lewis was established in 1805 from a section of the town of Willsboro. Part of Lewis was taken in 1844 and 1854 to increase the size of the town of Elizabethtown.

Iron mining was an important early industry. Both Stowersville and Deerhead were communities based on the iron industry.

The First Congregational Church and Cemetery was listed on the National Register of Historic Places in 2005.

== Notable person ==
- Joseph Call (March 31, 1781, near Woodstock, Vermont – September 20, 1835, in Westport, New York), the "Lewis Giant", was a strongman and wrestler of widespread fame, as well as a postmaster, millwright, logger, town assessor, auditor, justice of the peace, war veteran and teamster.

== Geography ==
According to the United States Census Bureau, the town has a total area of 85.0 square miles (220.1 km^{2}), of which 84.8 square miles (219.6 km^{2}) is land and 0.2 square miles (0.5 km^{2}), or 0.25%, is water. The town is drained by tributaries of the Boquet River, flowing east to Lake Champlain.

Lewis is inside the Adirondack Park.

The Northway, Interstate 87, is a major multilane north-south highway, with access from Exit 32 (Stowersville Road). U.S. Route 9 is a north-south highway that passes through the center of town.

The results of Proposition 5 being passed in the November 5 election of 2013 showed New York State to have successfully exchanged 200 acres of land with NYCO Minerals Inc., who will mine said land. The Land was estimated to be worth roughly 1 million dollars.

== Demographics ==
Historical population
Census	Pop.	Note	%±
1820	779		—
1830	1,305		67.5%
1840	1,505		15.3%
1850	2,058		36.7%
1860	1,807		−12.2%
1870	1,724		−4.6%
1880	1,774		2.9%
1890	1,323		−25.4%
1900	1,123		−15.1%
1910	937		−16.6%
1920	739		−21.1%
1930	667		−9.7%
1940	791		18.6%
1950	782		−1.1%
1960	803		2.7%
1970	763		−5.0%
1980	922		20.8%
1990	1,057		14.6%
2000	1,200		13.5%
2010	1,382		15.2%
2020	1,293		−6.4%
U.S. Decennial Census

At the 2000 census, there were 1,200 people, 475 households and 341 families residing in the town. The population density was 14.2 inhabitants per square mile (5.5/km^{2}). There were 620 housing units at an average density of 7.3 per square mile (2.8/km^{2}). The racial makeup of the town was 99.25% White, 0.17% African American, 0.25% Native American, 0.08% from other races, and 0.25% from two or more races. Hispanic or Latino of any race were 0.08% of the population.

There were 475 households, of which 33.9% had children under the age of 18 living with them, 56.0% were married couples living together, 10.7% had a female householder with no husband present, and 28.2% were non-families. 21.3% of all households were made up of individuals, and 6.7% had someone living alone who was 65 years of age or older. The average household size was 2.53 and the average family size was 2.91.

Age distribution was 27.3% under the age of 18, 5.3% from 18 to 24, 29.9% from 25 to 44, 25.9% from 45 to 64, and 11.5% who were 65 years of age or older. The median age was 38 years. For every 100 females, there were 110.2 males. For every 100 females age 18 and over, there were 103.7 males.

The median household income was $36,750, and the median family income was $37,778. Males had a median income of $28,950 versus $21,750 for females. The per capita income for the town was $17,030. About 5.5% of families and 8.1% of the population were below the poverty line, including 11.2% of those under age 18 and 10.2% of those age 65 or over.

== Communities and locations in Lewis ==
- Big Pond – A small lake northeast of Lewis village.
- Boquet River – A river in the southern part of Lewis.
- Crowningshield – A hamlet in the eastern part of the town.
- Deerhead – A hamlet in the northern part of the town on NY-9.
- Lewis – The hamlet of Lewis is on US-9 at the junction of County Road 10 (Lewis-Wadhams Road), west of Interstate 87, in the southern part of the town.
- Stowersville – A hamlet in the southeastern part of the town, east of Interstate 87. Stowersville was an important iron manufacturing location in the 19th century.
