= Mary Post =

American educator (1841–1934)

Mary Elizabeth Post

Mary Elizabeth Post (June 17, 1841 – 1934) was an American teacher and a pioneer of education in Arizona.

== Biography ==
A native of Elizabethtown, New York, her father was a carpenter who loved literature. From an early age, Post and her seven siblings were taught the importance of education and manners in society. Wanting a better future for his daughter, Post's father hired a teacher to teach her during summers. A fast learner, Post got her first job as a teacher in 1856 at the age of 15 Post applied for a scholarship at the University of Vermont, not knowing that the university did not accept female students. Undaunted by this rejection, she went on to study at the Burlington Female Seminary. In 1863, after graduating from that school, Post relocated with her family to Iowa.

In Iowa, Post met and fell in love with a politician who was a rising star in his party. While he was campaigning for an important political position, his political enemies, aware that he was about to win the election, spread a rumor that he was having an affair. While these rumors had no base, Post believed them and, deeply hurt, avoided him for the rest of her life, refusing to speak with him or respond to his letters. Soon after, she accepted a job teaching in Lansing, Iowa. While in Lansing, Post began to investigate her former boyfriend's supposed affair. Despite discovering the truth, she did not apologize to him.

Post moved to Arizona City, Arizona (now known as Yuma, Arizona) in 1872. Upon her arrival in Yuma, she was met by Arizona territorial governor Anson P. K. Safford. Only the fifth teacher in Arizona, Post got help from Safford to re-open a former saloon and turn it into Arizona's third school.

Post was known as a strict rule enforcer in class; for example, if a student missed class Post would go to the student's home and unless the student had a valid excuse not to be in class, would take the student to school herself. Many of her students' parents disliked her practices, and Post was aware of this. She began to win the parents over, however, by ordering trendy uniforms from San Francisco and teaching the students' mothers how to sew.

On May 2, 1873, Mary witnessed the hanging of Manuel Fernandez, who had been found guilty of murdering Michael "Rawhide" McCartney, a local salesman. Disillusioned by the act and by the subsequent approval by the Arizona Sentinel, Post decided to relocate to San Diego, California, where she took a job as general vice-principal of San Diego's school system. However, only a year later she returned to Arizona City. She and her brother, Albert, shared positions at her new school; Mary supervised the girls while Albert oversaw the boys.

Occasionally, Post engaged in creative fundraising for education. Post once convinced a wealthy man to hold a charity horse race that raised $600, which she used to buy school supplies. She also hired Colorado River boat captain Isaac Pulhamus (1828-1922) to organize a beauty contest from which she garnered $500, which were also used for school supplies.

After her retirement from teaching at the age of 72, the United States Senate passed a bill which dictated for Post to receive a pension of fifty dollars a month. She was the first teacher in the state to do so. In her retirement, Post operated a small store and pursued her hobby of sewing, going door to door teaching women to sew clothes. Post died of natural causes in 1934, at the age of 93. The "Mary E. Post school" in Yuma is named after her.

== Other sources ==
- Leo Banks, Stalwart Women: Frontier Stories of Indomitable Spirit (ISBN 0-916179-77-X)
- C. Louise Boehringer, "Mary Elizabeth Post – High Priestess of Americanization". Arizona Historical Review. Vol. 2, No. 2. July 1929
