= First Congregational and Presbyterian Society Church of Westport =

Historic church in New York, United States

- U.S. National Register of Historic Places
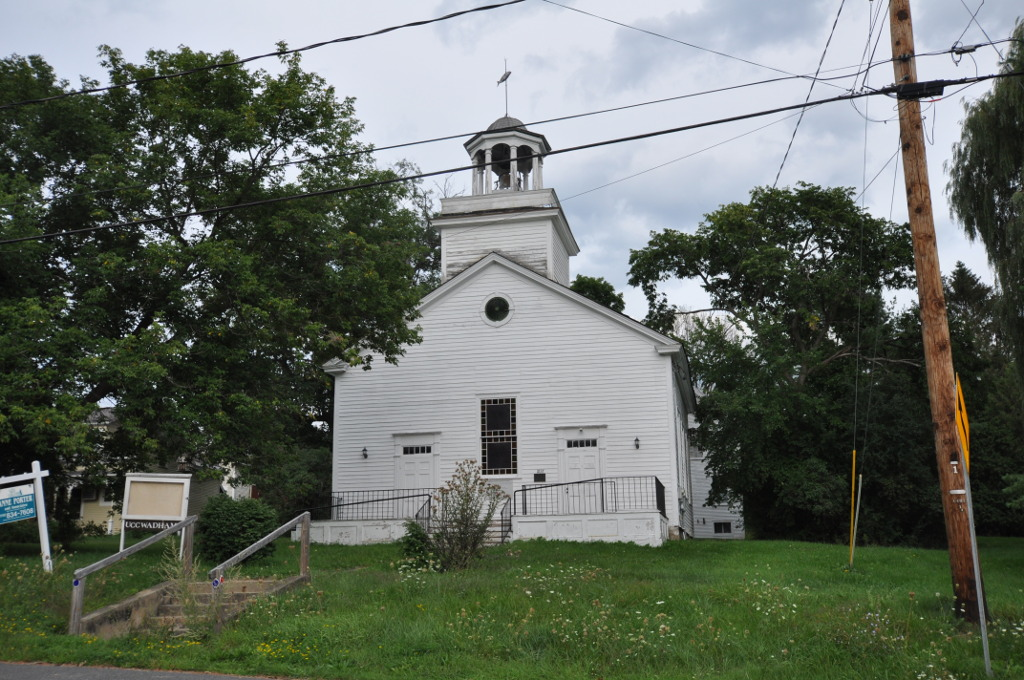

- Location within New York Location within the United States
- Location: Main St./CR 10, Westport, New York
- Coordinates: 44°13′50″N 73°27′33″W
- Area: less than one acre
- Built: 1837
- Architect: Braman, Jason
- Architectural style: Federal
- NRHP reference No.: 88002750
- Added to NRHP: December 19, 1988

First Congregational and Presbyterian Society Church of Westport, now known as United Church of Christ of Wadhams, is a historic Congregational church on Main Street/CR 10 in Westport, Essex County, New York. It was built in 1837 and is a vernacular, Federal style meeting house form building. It is a one-story building with clapboard exterior siding and a simple gable roof. It features a two-tiered belfry with dome-shaped roof above the west gable end. The adjacent parish hall was formerly a dance hall and moved to this site in 1901. It is a plain, two-story rectangular structure with a gable roof and clapboard siding.

It was listed on the National Register of Historic Places in 1988.
