= Hand–Hale Historic District =

Historic district in New York, United States

- U.S. National Register of Historic Places
- U.S. Historic district
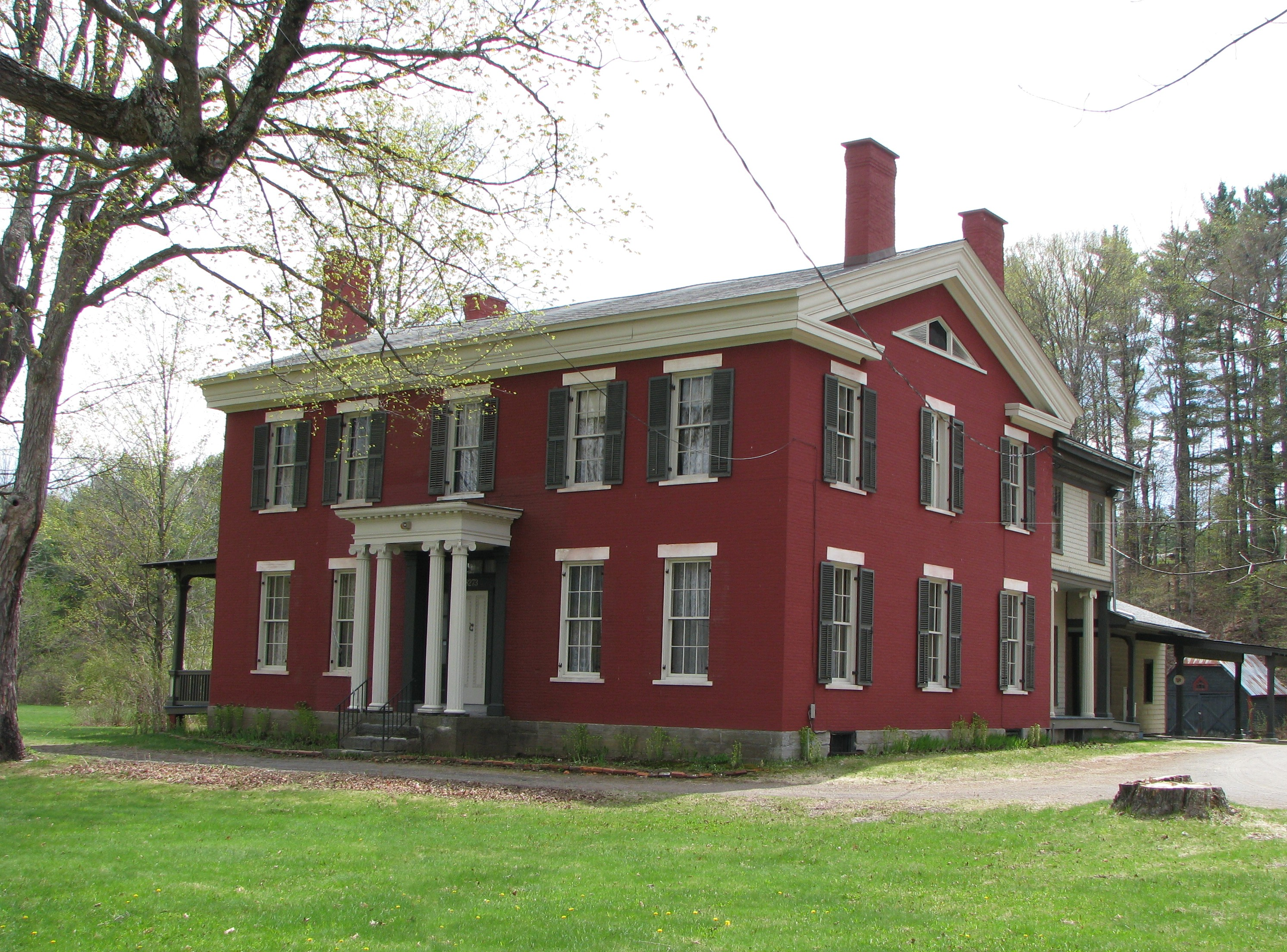
- Hand House, May 2009

- Location within New York Location within the United States
- Location: River and Maple Sts., Elizabethtown, New York
- Coordinates: 44°12′54″N 73°35′19″W
- Area: 23 acres (9.3 ha)
- Architectural style: Greek Revival
- NRHP reference No.: 79001582
- Added to NRHP: March 5, 1979

Hand–Hale Historic District is a national historic district located at Elizabethtown in Essex County, New York. The district contains seven contributing buildings. It encompasses the Hand House and Law Office, the Hale House and Law Office, and dependencies associated with both properties.

The Hand House is an elegantly formal, two-story Greek Revival style dwelling built in 1849. The Hand Law Office was built before 1830 as a modest frame building and enlarged in 1865 with a brick addition.

The Hale House was built originally in 1814 and modified extensively in the 1850 to 1870 period. It is a rambling, two-story frame dwelling. The Hale Law Office is a modest, one-story gable-roofed structure with a portico. The remaining buildings are a garage, Hale Barn Complex, and caretaker's cottage.

It was listed on the National Register of Historic Places in 1979.

== See also ==
- Augustus C. Hand
- Robert S. Hale
