= Hubbard Hall (Elizabethtown, New York) =

Historic house in New York, United States

- U.S. National Register of Historic Places
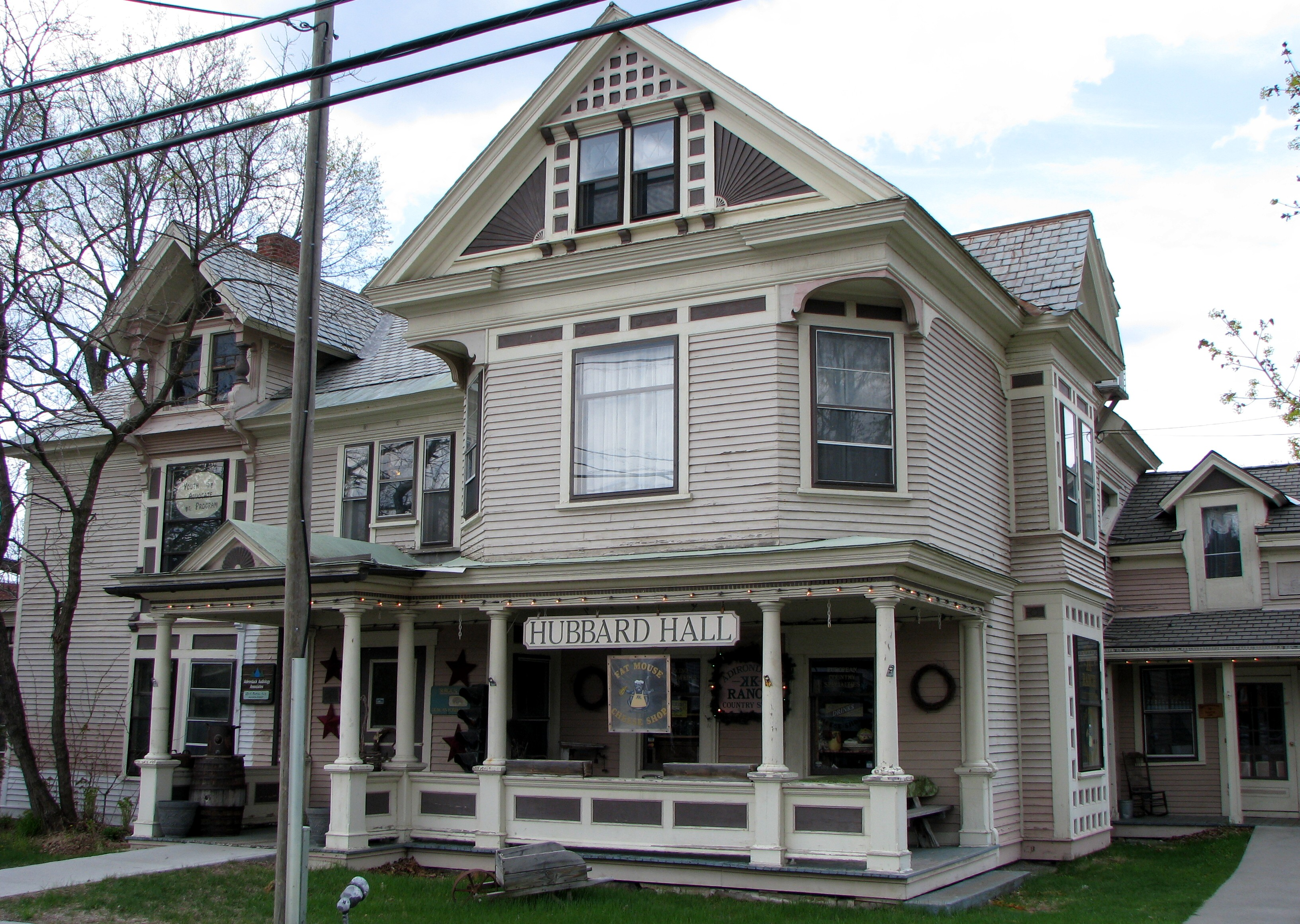
- Hubbard Hall, May 2009

- Location within New York Location within the United States
- Location: Court St., Elizabethtown, New York
- Coordinates: 44°12′56″N 73°35′33″W
- Area: less than one acre
- Architectural style: Queen Anne
- NRHP reference No.: 98001584
- Added to NRHP: January 21, 1999

Hubbard Hall, also known as Kellogg House and Elizabethtown Community House, was a historic home located at Elizabethtown in Essex County, New York. It was a 2 1/2-story wood-frame building in the Queen Anne style. Hubbard Hall was originally built about 1840 as a typical five-by-two-bay Federal / Greek Revival–style structure and extensively remodeled in 1895. It featured multiple gables and dormers and interesting roof lines. A porch extended across three quarters of the front facade. In 1925 it was converted from a residence to a community hospital. A 2-story wing was added in 1946.

It was listed on the National Register of Historic Places in 1999. However, the building was destroyed by a fire on January 11, 2011
