= Russia iron =

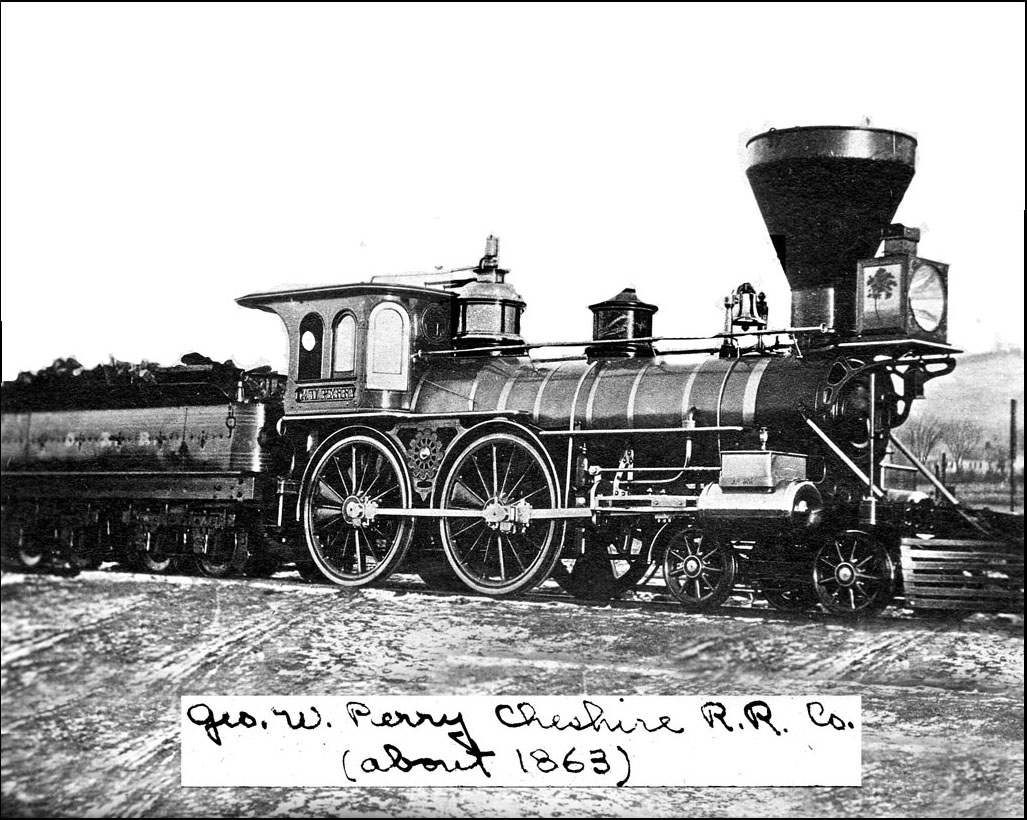
US locomotive George W. Perry of the Cheshire Railroad

Russia iron or Russian iron refers to a type of sheet iron produced in Russia during the 19th and early 20th century. This iron sheeting had a smooth, glossy black surface coating, sometimes greenish-tinged, which did not flake upon bending and made the sheets highly resistant to rusting. As well as its corrosion resistance, the finish would also withstand high heat; these two properties accounted for most of its uses. Kodak used it around 1906 for the manufacture of their photographic enlargers. These properties led to it being the standard for manufacturing gold pans at the turn of the 20th century.

== Uses ==
This sheet-iron was used in Russia for stove flues and for roofing, among other tasks. Exported in quantity to the United States, it was notably used there for the cladding of steam locomotive boilers, where it found favor because paints of the time could not withstand the heat to which boiler cladding was subjected; its fine decorative finish went well with the brightly painted locomotives of the time. Its heat-resistant finish also led to its use to clad stoves, ovens, heating pipes and other similar tasks, and in the manufacture of baking pans and sheets.

== Manufacturing process ==
The manufacturing process is complex but basically depends upon the creation of an oxide coating.

== Imitation Russia iron ==
Much effort was expended on attempting to duplicate Russia iron in the United States, with varying degrees of success. Henry Stafford Osborn, in his text The Metallurgy of Iron and Steel (1869), describes a process used successfully which is close to descriptions of the Russian method.

== Replacement ==
The development of high-temperature paints and the trend towards black-painted locomotives combined to reduce the demand for Russia iron by 1900, and little if any was imported after the beginning of World War I.

== Bibliography ==
- An Elementary Outline Of Mechanical Processes by George W. Danforth, 1912
- The Manufacture of Russian Sheet-iron by John Percy 1871
- Engineering and Mining Journal, September 21 1878
- "Manufacture Of Russian Sheet Iron" The Engineering and Mining Journal, Dec. 1, 1888 pg 461-462.
- The Iron Industry In Russia. Published by the Russian Economic League, 1919
- Description of "Russia Iron" from Knight's American Mechanical Dictionary Vol III 1877
