= Boquet River =

River in the United States of America

Coordinates: 44.35533°N 73.35596°W

The course of the Boquet River in Essex County, New York

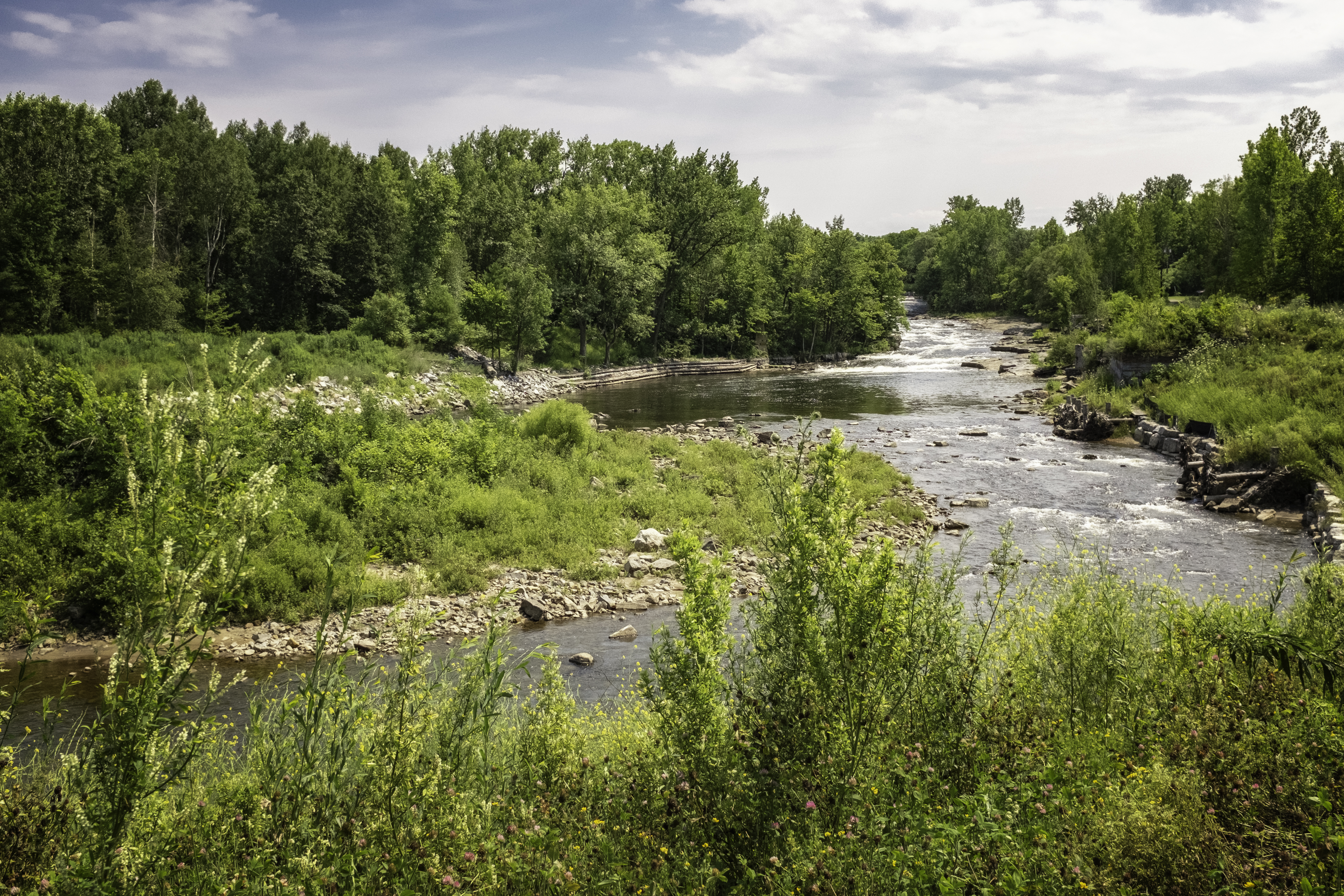
A view of the Boquet River in New York State.

The Boquet River (pronounced BO-kwet) is a small river in upstate New York, United States. It was sometimes called the Bouquet River before a 1982 Board on Geographic Names decision. It is the steepest river in New York state, with a vertical drop of over 2,700 feet (823 m) over 40 miles (64 kilometers) from its source on Dix Mountain in the Adirondack Mountains to its mouth at Lake Champlain.

The South Fork of the Boquet originates on South Dix Mountain in North Hudson. It runs northeast through Keene and enters Elizabethtown where it is joined from the west by the North Fork of the Boquet near the intersection of US route 9 and NY route 73. Northeast of downtown Elizabethtown, it becomes the border of the Town of Lewis. It then flows east under the Adirondack Northway (Interstate 87) in Lewis, turns south to pass through the southwest corner of Essex into Westport before looping north back into Essex and then Willsboro where it empties into Lake Champlain at Noblewood Park. It traverses several waterfalls, including at Split Rock, a large flume falls in the center of Wadhams, and in downtown Willsboro. The river flows through the Boquet River Nature Preserve in downtown Willsboro. Tributaries of the Boquet include the North Branch, The Branch or Little Boquet, Spruce Mill Brook, and The Black River/Lincoln Pond. The watershed drains 280-square miles within the Adirondack Park in Essex county.

== History ==
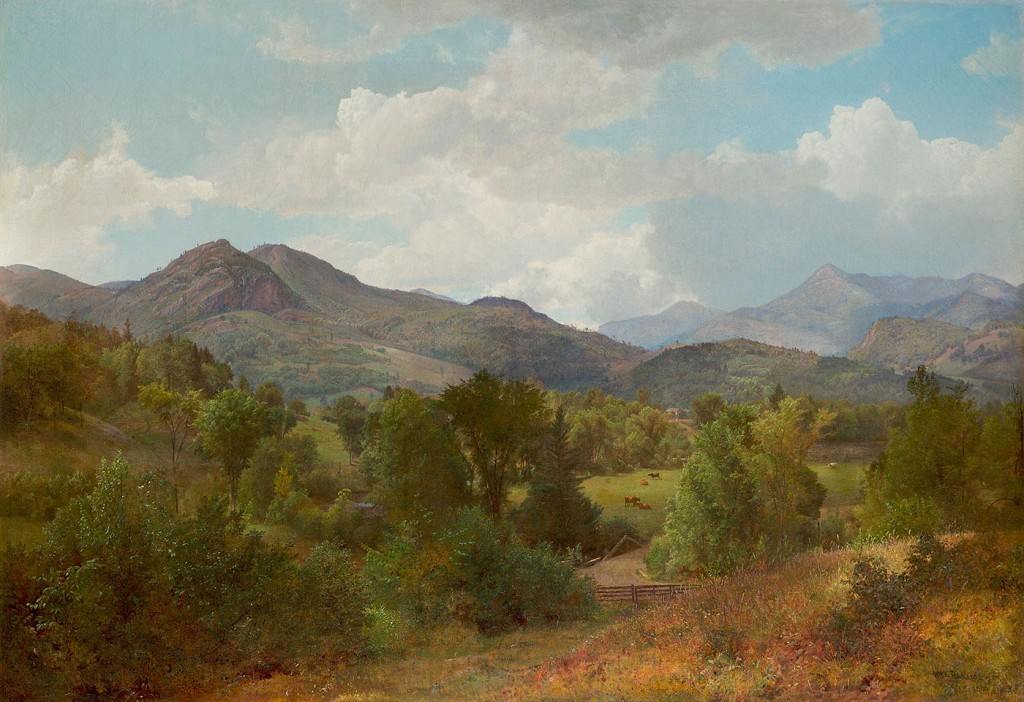
'Bouquet Valley in the Adirondacks' by William Trost Richards, 1863

The first European to see the Boquet was probably the French explorer Samuel De Champlain, who passed by its mouth as he sailed north along the west side of Lake Champlain in July of 1609. During the American War of Independence, British General John Burgoyne rested with his army troops at the mouth of the river in June of 1777, just before the beginning of the Saratoga campaign. On May 13, 1814, during the War of 1812, also at the mouth of the river, the New York Militia repulsed an attempt by a British landing party to sail upstream to destroy the public stores held at Willsboro.

== Hydropower and other uses ==
In the 19th and 20th centuries, a 9 ft (2.7 m) dam across the river in downtown Willsboro was used to run a paper mill. The dam impeded the spawning of Atlantic salmon. Since the dam was removed in 2015, salmon fry have reappeared in the river. In 2008, the 7 ft (2.1 m) Crowningshield Dam was removed from the North Branch of the Boquet in Lewis. In 2022, a 4 ft (1.2 m) dam was removed from the Cold Brook (a tributary of the North Branch) in Reber.

In the 21st century, the river supplies multiple recreational resources, natural protection, scenic vistas, and supports agriculture and timbering.

== See also ==
- List of rivers in New York
