= List of Congregational churches =

These are notable Congregational churches, included as either a notable congregation or a notable building of the same name.

== Australia ==
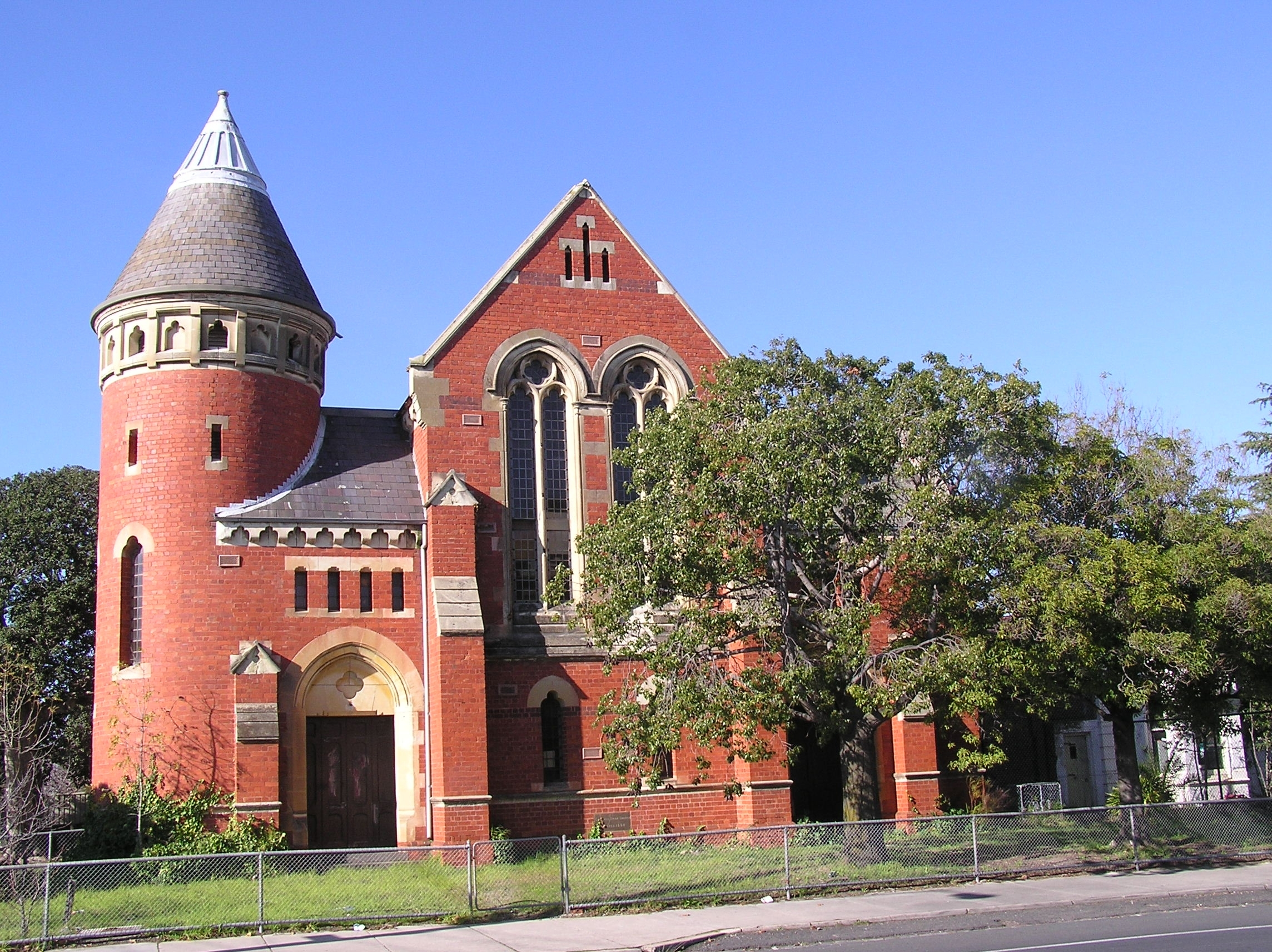

- Elsternwick Congregational Church (1894–1977); Orrong Road, Elsternwick, Victoria

== China ==
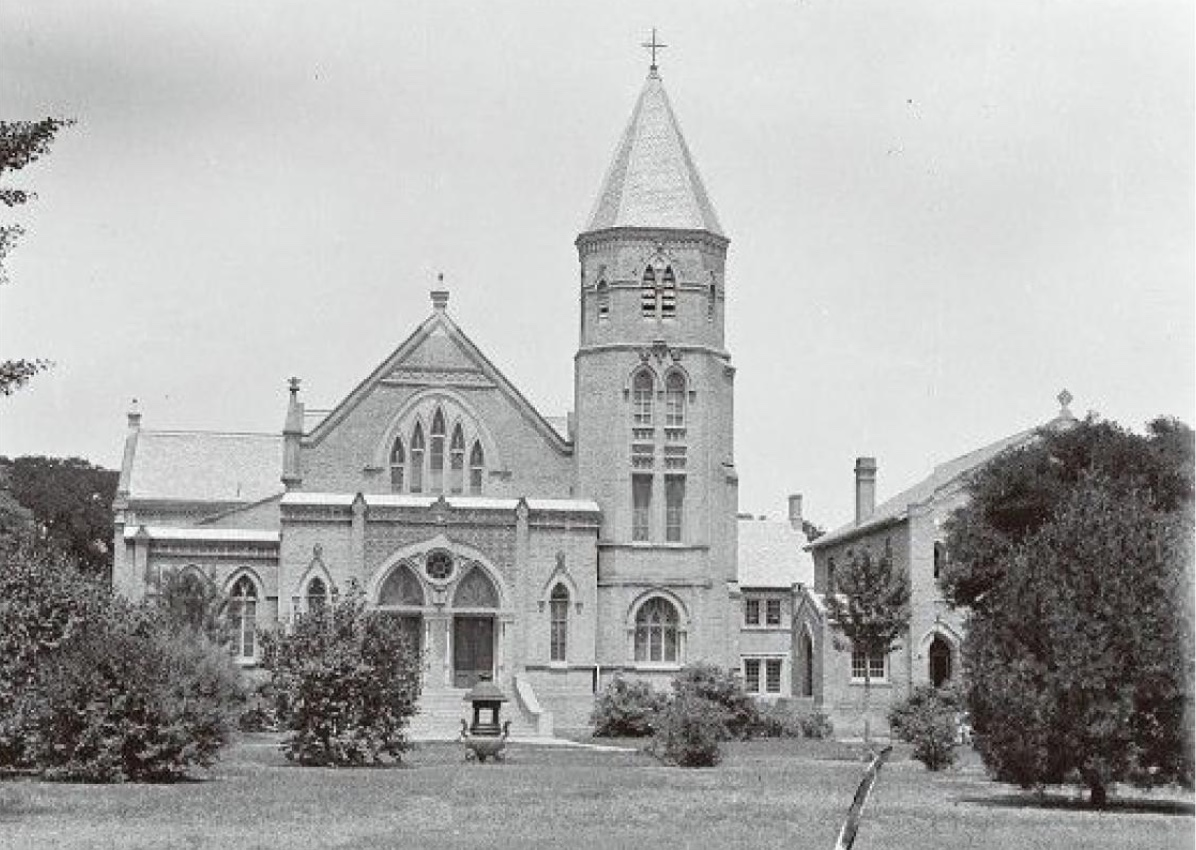

- Teng Shih K'ou Congregational Church (built in 1864, demolished between 1966 and 1976); Dongcheng District, Beijing

== United Kingdom ==
These are notable churches in the U.K. that are identified as Congregational, either currently or historically.

Church	Image	Dates	Location	City	Description
All Saints United Reformed Church		1881 built	Junction Road; 50°57′14″N 0°07′30″W	Burgess Hill	Neoclassical; was a Congregational church, now is a United Reformed Church.
Emmanuel United Reformed Church		1687 founded 1875 built	Trumpington Street; 52°12′7.2″N 0°7′4.08″W	Cambridge	Gothic Revival; was a Congregational church until 1972 when it became a United Reformed Church. Congregation became Downing Place URC in 2017; the building now belongs to Pembroke College.
Congregational Chapel, Nantwich		1841 founded	Monk's Lane; 53.0671°N 2.5193°W	Nantwich, Cheshire, England	A former church, now a residence, a grade II listed building
Abney Park Chapel		1840 opened	51.5644°N 0.0774°W	Abney Park Cemetery, London	Asserted to be the first nondenominational cemetery chapel in Europe and perhaps the world. Architecturally significant as a pioneering use of the Dissenting Gothic building style, designed by William Hosking. Revived interest in the careful blending of earlier styles. A Grade II listed building
Finsbury Chapel		1825 founded	51.51754°N 0.8519°W	Finsbury, London	No longer extant. At its peak this was the largest chapel in London.
Herstmonceux Free Church		1811 founded 1966 Grade II listed		Herstmonceux, East Sussex	
Clark Street Congregational Church, Morecambe		1863 built	54.0743°N 2.8619°W	Morecambe, Lancashire	Former Congregational church, closed before 1980, now offices.
Queen's Walk Congregational Church		founded 1900-02 built		Nottingham	Formed as a Congregational church, later converted. Closed in 1970.
Union Chapel		1799 founded 1874-1877 built	51.544707°N 0.102503°W	Islington, London	Victorian Gothic

== United States ==
In the United States, numerous Congregational churches are notable, some for their buildings that are listed on the National Register of Historic Places and/or on state and local historic registers. This list in progress includes most NRHP-listed buildings and other notable American congregations, too.

American Congregational churches include:

(by state then city or town)

Church	Image	Dates	Location	City, State	Description
First Congregational Church of Marion		1871 built 1982 NRHP-listed	601 Clay St. 32°37′39″N 87°19′41″W	Marion, Alabama	
First Congregational Church and Parsonage		1880 founded 1899 built 1978 NRHP-listed	216-220 E. Gurley	Prescott, Arizona	Late Victorian, Romanesque
Copperopolis Congregational Church		1866 built 1997 NRHP-listed	411 Main St. 37°58′47″N 120°38′16″W	Copperopolis, California	Gothic Revival
Eden Congregational Church		built 2007 NRHP-listed	37°40′51.49″N 122°5′37″W	Hayward, California	
First Congregational Church (Porterville, California)		1909 built 1999 NRHP-listed	165 E. Mill St. 36°4′7″N 119°0′43″W	Porterville, California	Late Gothic Revival, Shingle Style
First Congregational Church of Pescadero		1890 built 1980 NRHP-listed	San Gregorio St. 37°15′16″N 122°22′56″W	Pescadero, California	Classical Revival
Sierra Madre Congregational Church		1890 built	Sierra Madre Blvd. 34°9′44.03″N 118°3′24.099″W	Sierra Madre, California	Classical Revival
First Congregational Church of Riverside		1913 built 1997 NRHP-listed	3504 Mission Inn Ave. 33°58′54″N 117°22′16″W	Riverside, California	Spanish Colonial Revival
German Evangelical Immanuel Congregational Church		1927 built 2005 NRHP-listed	209 Everett St. 40°15′35″N 103°37′13″W	Brush, Colorado	Late Gothic Revival
First Congregational Church (Colorado Springs, Colorado)		1889 built 2002 NRHP-listed	20 E. St. Vrain St. 38°50′28″N 104°49′22″W	Colorado Springs, Colorado	Romanesque
First Congregational Church (Denver, Colorado)		1907 built 1987 NRHP-listed	980 Clarkson St. 39°43′54″N 104°58′36″W	Denver, Colorado	Late 19th and 20th century Revival, Lombardic Revival
Congregational Church		1890 founded 1983 NRHP-listed		Lafayette, Colorado	Served a mining community
First Congregational Church of Lyons		1976 NRHP-listed	High and 4th Sts.	Lyons, Colorado	
First Congregational Church (Manitou Springs, Colorado)		1880 built 1979 NRHP-listed	101 Pawnee Ave. 38°51′23″N 104°54′47″W	Manitou Springs, Colorado	Gothic
First Congregational Church (Pueblo, Colorado)		1889 built 1985 NRHP-listed	225 W. Evans; 38°15′37″N 104°37′57″W	Pueblo, Colorado	Romanesque
Ward Congregational Church		1894-95 built 1989 NRHP-listed	41 Modoc; 40°4′22″N 105°30′29″W	Ward, Colorado	At its uphill location, escaped 1900 fire that destroyed most of Ward.
Abington Congregational Church		1751 built 1977 NRHP-listed	CT 9741°51′27″N 72°0′29″W	Abington, Connecticut	Oldest church building in the state of Connecticut. Greek Revival, Greek Revival Vernacular.
Avon Congregational Church		1819 built 1972 NRHP-listed	Jct. of U.S. 202 and 44; 41°48′36″N 72°49′52″W	Avon, Connecticut	Designed by David Hoadley
Bozrah Congregational Church and Parsonage		1843 built 1991 NRHP-listed	17 and 23 Bozrah St. 41°33′24″N 72°9′56″W	Bozrah, Connecticut	Greek Revival, Italianate in style
United Congregational Church (Bridgeport, Connecticut)		1925-26 built 1984 NRHP-listed	877 Park Ave. 41°10′30″N 73°12′0″W	Bridgeport, Connecticut	Colonial Revival
South Canaan Congregational Church		1804 built 1983 NRHP-listed	CT 63 and Barnes Rd. 41°57′42″N 73°20′7″W	Canaan, Connecticut	Federal style; one of the first generation of stylish, rather than plain, church buildings in America Federal
First Congregational Church of Cheshire		1827 built 1973 NRHP-listed	111 Church Dr. 41°29′53″N 72°54′13″W	Cheshire, Connecticut	Designed by David Hoadley in Federal, Adamesque style
First Congregational Church of East Hartford and Parsonage		1833 built 1982 NRHP-listed	829-837 Main St. 41°46′8″N 72°38′41″W	East Hartford, Connecticut	Greek Revival
First Congregational Church of East Haven		1774 built 1982 NRHP-listed	251 Main St. 41°16′41″N 72°52′19″W	East Haven, Connecticut	
Centerbrook Congregational Church		1790 built 1987 NRHP-listed	Main St. 41°21′6″N 72°24′53″W	Essex, Connecticut	Greek Revival
Mount Carmel Congregational Church and Parish House		1840 built 1991 NRHP-listed	3280 and 3284 Whitney Ave., 195 Sherman Ave. 41°24′50″N 72°54′9″W	Hamden, Connecticut	Colonial Revival, Greek Revival
Whitneyville Congregational Church (Hamden, Connecticut)		1834 built 1995 NRHP-listed	1247-53 Whitney Ave. 41°20′48″N 72°54′47″W	Hamden, Connecticut	Designed by Rufus G. Russell in Greek Revival style
Fourth Congregational Church		1913 built 1982 NRHP-listed	Albany Ave. and Vine St. 41°46′47″N 72°41′23″W	Hartford, Connecticut	Georgian Revival
Windsor Avenue Congregational Church		1871 built 1993 NRHP-listed	2030 Main St. 41°46′56″N 72°40′33″W	Hartford, Connecticut	Romanesque
Kensington Congregational Church		1712 established 1774 present(2nd) meeting house built	312 Percival Ave. 41°37′22.1″N 72°47′0.5″W	Kensington, Connecticut	Colonial Revival
Marlborough Congregational Church		1842 built 1993 NRHP-listed	35 S. Main St. 41°37′44″N 72°27′19″W	Marlborough, Connecticut	Colonial Revival
South Congregational Church (New Britain, Connecticut)		1865 built 1990 NRHP-listed	90 Main St. 41°39′54″N 72°46′56″W	New Britain, Connecticut	Gothic Revival
Plymouth Congregational Church (New Haven, Connecticut)		1894 built 1983 NRHP-listed	1469 Chapel St. 41°18′41″N 72°56′40″W	New Haven, Connecticut	Romanesque, Richardsonian Romanesque
First Congregational Church of Plainfield		1816 built 1986 NRHP-listed	41°41′6″N 71°54′55″W	Plainfield, Connecticut	Ithiel Town-designed, Federal style
Congregational Church of Plainville		2012 NRHP-listed	130 W. Main St. 41°40′12″N 72°52′27″W	Plainville, Connecticut	
Ridgebury Congregational Church		1851 built 1984 NRHP-listed	Ridgebury Rd. and George Washington Hwy. 41°21′38″N 73°31′32″W	Ridgebury, Connecticut	Greek Revival
Rocky Hill Congregational Church		1805 built 1982 NRHP-listed	805-817 Old Main St. 41°39′56″N 72°38′21″W	Rocky Hill, Connecticut	Georgian
First Church of Christ Congregational		1869 built 1979 CP NRHP-listed	41°39′56″N 72°38′21″W	Suffield, Connecticut	Designed by John C. Mead in Romanesque Revival style; had a tall spire that was toppled in the 1938 hurricane; included in the Suffield Historic District.
Warren Congregational Church		1818 built 1991 NRHP-listed	4 Sackett Hill Rd. 41°44′37″N 73°20′58″W	Warren, Connecticut	Federal
First Congregational Church of Naples		2004	6630 Immokalee Rd, Naples, FL 34119 .	Naples, Florida	
Coral Gables Congregational Church		1923 designed 1978 NRHP-listed	25°44′33″N 80°16′44″W	Coral Gables, Florida	
Plymouth Congregational Church (Miami, Florida)		1974 NRHP-listed	25°43′19″N 80°14′18″W	Miami, Florida	
First Congregational Church (Atlanta, Georgia)		1979 NRHP-listed	105 Courtland St., NE. 33°45′27″N 84°23′01″W	Atlanta, Georgia	
Evergreen Congregational Church and School		2002 NRHP-listed	497 Meridian Rd. 30°43′48″N 84°08′01″W	Beachton, Georgia	
Bethany Congregational Church (Thomasville, Georgia)		1891 built 1985 NRHP-listed	112 Lester St. 30°49′13″N 83°59′11″W	Thomasville, Georgia	
Wananalua Congregational Church		1842 built 1988 NRHP-listed	Hana Highway and Haouli Street; 20°45′6″N 155°59′12″W	Hana, Hawaii	Renaissance
New Plymouth Congregational Church		1982 NRHP-listed	Southwest Ave. between West Park and Plymouth; 43°58′11″N 116°49′11″W	New Plymouth, Idaho	
First Congregational Church of Austin		1908 built 1977 NRHP-listed	5701 W. Midway Place; 41°53′19″N 87°46′5″W	Chicago, Illinois	
Union Park Congregational Church and Carpenter Chapel		1869 built 2006 NRHP-listed	1613 W. Washington Blvd. 41°53′6″N 87°40′3″W	Chicago, Illinois	Gothic
First Congregational Church of Elgin		1836 founded 1889 built	256 E. Chicago St. 42°1′1″N 88°22′57″W	Elgin, Illinois	Richardsonian Romanesque, Akron Plan
Central Congregational Church		1897 built 1976 NRHP-listed	Central Sq. 40°56′49″N 90°22′15″W	Galesburg, Illinois	Romanesque, Richardsonian Romanesque
First Congregational Church of LaMoille		1867 built 1996 NRHP-listed	94 Franklin St. 41°31′51″N 89°16′47″W	LaMoille, Illinois	Italianate
First Congregational Church (Marshall, Illinois)		1908 built 2003 NRHP-listed	202 N 6th St. 39°23′37″N 87°41′48″W	Marshall, Illinois	Romanesque
First Congregational Church of Sterling		1898 built 1995 NRHP-listed	311 Second Ave. 41°47′21″N 89°41′37″W	Sterling, Illinois	Richardsonian Romanesque
First Congregational Church of Western Springs		2006 NRHP-listed	1106 Chestnut St. 41°48′53″N 87°54′11″W	Western Springs, Illinois	Late Gothic Revival, Prairie School
First Congregational Church (Terre Haute, Indiana)		1902 built 1983 NRHP-listed	630 Ohio St. 39°27′57″N 87°24′33″W	Terre Haute, Indiana	Gothic Revival
First Congregational Church of Michigan City		1881 built 2001 NRHP-listed	531 Washington St. 41°42′57″N 86°54′12″W	Michigan City, Indiana	Romanesque, Tudor Revival
Bethany Congregational Church (West Terre Haute, Indiana)		2003 NRHP-listed	201 W. Miller Ave. 39.466944°N 87.445833°W	West Terre Haute, Indiana	Designed by Charles Padgett in Gothic style
First Congregational Church (Burlington, Iowa)		1838 founded 1976 NRHP-listed	313 N. 4th St. 40°48′38″N 91°6′15″W	Burlington, Iowa	Gothic Revival; chose not to join the United Church of Christ but instead is a member of National Association of Congregational Christian Churches
Berea Congregational Church		1902 built 1983 NRHP-listed	2202 W. 4th Street; 41°31′25″N 90°36′41″W	Davenport, Iowa	Originally a Congregational church, it later became First Bible Missionary Church
Denmark Congregational Church		1977 NRHP-listed	Academy Ave. and 4th St. 40°44′31″N 91°20′0″W	Denmark, Iowa	Rev. Asa Turner, Jr., a noted abolitionist, was pastor in its early years.
First Congregational Church (Eldora, Iowa)		1894 built 1996 NRHP-listed	1209 12th St. 42°21′41″N 93°5′52″W	Eldora, Iowa	Romanesque
First Welsh Congregational Church		1977 NRHP-listed	41°36′47″N 91°36′33″W	Iowa City, Iowa	
First Congregational Church (Garnavillo, Iowa)		1866 built 1977 NRHP-listed	Washington St. 42°52′6″N 91°14′16″W	Garnavillo, Iowa	
Congregational Church of Iowa City		1856 founded 1869 built 1973 NRHP-listed	30 N. Clinton St. 41°39′44″N 91°32′2″W	Iowa City, Iowa	Designed by Gurdon P. Randall in Gothic Revival style
The Little Brown Church		1864 built		Nashua, Iowa	Made famous in a song, The Church in the Wildwood
St. John's United Church of Christ of Siegel		1874 founded	42.829°N 92.357°W	Siegel, Iowa	
First Congregational Church, Former (Sioux City, Iowa)		1916-18 built 1979 NRHP-listed	1301 Nebraska Street; 42°30′15.1″N 96°24′14.3″W	Sioux City, Iowa	Prairie School
Tabor Congregational Church		1875 built 2011 NRHP-listed	40°54′01″N 95°40′25″W	Tabor, Iowa	
First Congregational Church (Fort Scott, Kansas)		1873 built 2005 NRHP-listed	502 S. National Ave. 37°50′7″N 94°42′33″W	Fort Scott, Kansas	Gothic
Fairmount Congregational Church		1910 built 2006 NRHP-listed	1650 N. Fairmont; 37°42′55″N 97°17′48″W	Wichita, Kansas	Romanesque
Plymouth Congregational Church (Lawrence, Kansas)		1868-70 built 2009 NRHP-listed	38°57′59.6″N 95°14′14.5″W	Lawrence, Kansas	Victorian with Gothic and Romanesque Revival characteristics
Pilgrim Congregational Church (Arkansas City, Kansas)		1891 built 2005 NRHP-listed	101 N. Third St. 37°3′45″N 97°2′33″W	Arkansas City, Kansas	Romanesque
First Congregational Church (Manhattan, Kansas)		1859 built 2008 NRHP-listed	700 Poyntz Avenue; 39°10′53″N 96°34′2″W	Manhattan, Kansas	Late Gothic Revival
Ellis Congregational Church		1907 built 2000 NRHP-listed	Eighth and Washington Sts. 38°56′26″N 99°33′37″W	Ellis, Kansas	Gothic Revival
St. Mary Congregational Church		1905 built 1999 NRHP-listed	213 S. Louisiana Ave. 29°58′17″N 92°8′3″W	Abbeville, Louisiana	Gothic Revival
Lincoln Industrial Mission-Lincoln Memorial Congregational Church		1928 built 1995 NRHP-listed	1701 11th St., NW; 38°54′47″N 77°1′36″W	Washington, D.C.	Howard Wright Cutler-designed
South Parish Congregational Church and Parish House		1865 built 1980 NRHP-listed	Church St. 44°19′2″N 69°46′33″W	Augusta, Maine	Stick-Eastlake, Gothic Revival
All Souls Congregational Church (Bangor, Maine)		1992 NRHP-listed	10 Broadway; 44°48′9″N 68°46′5″W	Bangor, Maine	
Elm Street Congregational Church and Parish House		1838 built 1990 NRHP-listed	Jct. of Elm and Franklin Sts. 44°34′24″N 68°47′41″W	Bucksport, Maine	Greek Revival, Second Empire
First Congregational Church of Buxton		1822 built 1980 NRHP-listed	ME 112; 43°36′23″N 70°32′14″W	Buxton, Maine	Federal-style
Spurwink Congregational Church		1802 built 1970 NRHP-listed	Spurwink Ave. 43°34′47″N 70°15′8″W	Cape Elizabeth, Maine	
Central Congregational Church		1829 built 1976 NRHP-listed	Middle St. 44°54′14″N 66°59′16″W	Eastport, Maine	
Ellsworth Congregational Church		1846 built 1973 NRHP-listed	State St. 44°32′37″N 68°25′52″W	Ellsworth, Maine	Greek Revival
First Congregational Church, United Church of Christ		1887 built 1974 NRHP-listed	Main St. 44°40′4″N 70°9′0″W	Farmington, Maine	Romanesque
Hampden Congregational Church		1835 built 1987 NRHP-listed	Main Rd. N 44°44′47″N 68°50′12″W	Hampden, Maine	Greek Revival, Federal
First Congregational Church and Parsonage (Kittery Point, Maine)		1729 & 1733 built 1978 & 1997 NRHP-listed	Pepperrell Rd. 43°4′54″N 70°42′56″W	Kittery Point, Maine	Greek Revival, Colonial
Centre Street Congregational Church		1837 built 1975 NRHP-listed	Centre St. 44°42′54″N 67°27′37″W	Machias, Maine	Gothic Revival
Congregational Church of Medway		1874 built 1977 NRHP-listed	Off ME 11; 45°36′20″N 68°31′39″W	Medway, Maine	
Moose River Congregational Church		1891 built 1998 NRHP-listed	45°38′24″N 70°15′43″W	Jackman, Maine	Late Gothic Revival
Milford Congregational Church		1883 built 1989 NRHP-listed	Main and Perry Sts. 44°56′48″N 68°38′45″W	Milford, Maine	Queen Anne, Romanesque
Second Congregational Church (Newcastle, Maine)		1848 built 1979 NRHP-listed	River St. 44°2′4″N 69°32′15″W	Newcastle, Maine	Gothic Revival
New Sharon Congregational Church		1845 built 1985 NRHP-listed	ME 134; 44°38′10″N 70°0′50″W	New Sharon, Maine	Mid-19th-century Revival
Congregational Church of Edgecomb		1877 built 1987 NRHP-listed	Cross Point Rd. 43°59′7″N 69°38′47″W	North Edgecomb, Maine	
North Waterford Congregational Church		1860 built 1986 NRHP-listed	Off ME 35; 44°6′57″N 70°46′24″W	North Waterford, Maine	Italianate
Oxford Congregational Church and Cemetery		1842 built 1994 NRHP-listed	King St. E side, 0.2 mi. N of jct. with ME 121; 44°8′2″N 70°29′30″W	Oxford, Maine	Greek Revival, Gothic Revival
Pittston Congregational Church		1836 built 1978 NRHP-listed	Junction of ME 27 and ME 194; 44°13′2″N 69°45′19″W	Pittston, Maine	Greek Revival, Federal, Gothic Revival
Rumford Point Congregational Church		1865 built 1985 NRHP-listed	ME 5 and US 2 jct. 44°30′3″N 70°40′18″W	Rumford, Maine	Greek Revival
Seal Harbor Congregational Church		1902 built 1985 NRHP-listed	ME 3; 44°17′37″N 68°14′54″W	Seal Harbor, Maine	
South Bridgton Congregational Church		1870 built 1987 NRHP-listed	Fosterville Rd. 43°59′19″N 70°42′23″W	South Bridgton, Maine	
Finnish Congregational Church and Parsonage		1921 built 1994 NRHP-listed	44°4′18″N 69°9′43″W	South Thomaston, Maine	Late Victorian, Bungalow/Craftsman
Springfield Congregational Church		1852 built 1978 NRHP-listed	ME 6; 45°23′45″N 68°8′16″W	Springfield, Maine	Gothic Revival
First Congregational Church, Former (Wells, Maine)		1862 built 1991 NRHP-listed	SW corner of Rt. 1 and Barker's Ln. 43°18′5″N 70°35′12″W	Wells, Maine	Romanesque, Gothic Revival
West Brooksville Congregational Church		1855 built 1995 NRHP-listed	ME 176 E side, 1 mi. NW of jct. with Varnum Rd. 44°23′42″N 68°45′28″W	West Brooksville, Maine	Greek Revival
Whitneyville Congregational Church (Whitneyville, Maine)		1869 built 1979 NRHP-listed	Main St. 44°43′20″N 67°29′58″W	Whitneyville, Maine	Italianate
Winterport Congregational Church		1831 built 1973 NRHP-listed	Alt. U.S. 1; 44°38′9″N 68°50′49″W	Winterport, Maine	Gothic Revival
First Parish Congregational Church		1867 built 1995 NRHP-listed	135 Main St. 43°47′55″N 70°11′4″W	Yarmouth, Maine	Italianate
Westmoreland Congregational United Church of Christ		1948 built	1 Westmoreland Circle	Bethesda, Maryland	Greek Revival (designed by Leon Chatelain Jr., noted D.C. architect and former president of the American Inst. of Architects)
Pleasant Street Congregational Church		1844 built 1983 NRHP-listed	42°24′50″N 71°9′23″W	Arlington, Massachusetts	Greek Revival
Bernardston Congregational Unitarian Church		1739 built 1993 NRHP-listed	42°40′14″N 72°33′0″W	Bernardston, Massachusetts	Greek Revival
Allston Congregational Church		1890 built 1997 NRHP-listed	31-41 Quint Ave. 42°21′6.2″N 71°8′3.9″W	Boston, Massachusetts	
Baker Congregational Church		1903 built 1998 NRHP-listed	760 Saratoga St. 42°23′2″N 71°1′1.5″W	Boston, Massachusetts	Shingle Style
Brighton Evangelical Congregational Church		1922 built 1997 NRHP-listed	42°20′56.1″N 71°9′18.7″W	Boston, Massachusetts	Colonial Revival
Eliot Congregational Church		1873 built 1994 NRHP-listed	42°19′10″N 71°4′55″W	Boston, Massachusetts	Gothic
First Congregational Church of Hyde Park		1910 built 1999 NRHP-listed	6 Webster St. 42°15′27.4″N 71°7′13.4″W	Boston, Massachusetts	Late Gothic Revival
Park Street Church		1809 built	1 Park St.	Boston, Massachusetts	Designed by Peter Banner.
First Congregational Church of Blandford		1822 built 1985 NRHP-listed	42°10′55″N 72°55′45″W	Blandford, Massachusetts	Federal
Prospect Congregational Church		1851 built 1982 NRHP-listed	42°22′4″N 71°6′12″W	Cambridge, Massachusetts	Alexander Rice Esty-designed. Now a Reformed church
North Avenue Congregational Church		1845 built 1983 NRHP-listed	42°23′12″N 71°7′7″W	Cambridge, Massachusetts	Greek Revival
First Congregational Church of East Longmeadow		1828 built 1978 NRHP-listed	42°3′51″N 72°30′46″W	East Longmeadow, Massachusetts	Early Republic
North Christian Congregational Church		1842 built 1983 NRHP-listed	41°44′39″N 71°7′40″W	Fall River, Massachusetts	Gothic
Central Congregational Church		1871 built 1983 NRHP-listed	41°42′10″N 71°9′14″W	Fall River, Massachusetts	
Calvinistic Congregational Church		1896 built 1979 NRHP-listed	42°35′6″N 71°48′19″W	Fitchburg, Massachusetts	Romanesque
Housatonic Congregational Church		2002 NRHP-listed	1089 Main St. 42°15′29″N 73°21′56″W	Great Barrington, Massachusetts	Queen Anne, Colonial Revival
Society of the Congregational Church of Great Barrington		1883 built 1992 NRHP-listed	42°11′43″N 73°21′41″W	Great Barrington, Massachusetts	Romanesque
Pawtucket Congregational Church (Lowell, Massachusetts)		1898 built 2007 NRHP-listed	15 Mammoth Rd. 42°39′2″N 71°19′56″W	Lowell, Massachusetts	Romanesque, Queen Anne
First Church Congregational (Methuen, Massachusetts)		1855 built 1978 NRHP-listed	Pleasant and Stevens Sts. 42°43′46″N 71°11′8″W	Methuen, Massachusetts	Gothic Revival
Auburndale Congregational Church		1857 built 1986 NRHP-listed	64 Hancock Street; 42°20′38.75″N 71°14′59.78″W	Newton, Massachusetts	
Central Congregational Church		1895 built 1986 NRHP-listed	42°21′10″N 71°12′29″W	Newton, Massachusetts	Designed by Hartwell and Richardson in Romanesque style
Bethany Congregational Church (Quincy, Massachusetts)		1927 built 1989 NRHP-listed	8 Spear St. 42°15′8″N 71°0′4″W	Quincy, Massachusetts	Late Gothic Revival
Wollaston Congregational Church		1926 built 2008 NRHP-listed	45-57 Lincoln Avenue; 42°15′45.7″N 71°1′12″W	Quincy, Massachusetts	
North Rochester Congregational Church		1790 built 2008 NRHP-listed	41°46′57″N 70°53′39″W	Rochester, Massachusetts	Greek Revival
Roslindale Congregational Church		1893 built 1991 NRHP-listed	42°17′8.6″N 71°7′39″W	Roslindale, Massachusetts	Shingle Style, Romanesque
First Trinitarian Congregational Church		1826 built 2002 NRHP-listed	42°12′0″N 70°45′37″W	Scituate, Massachusetts	Classical Revival
Broadway Winter Hill Congregational Church		1890 built 1989 NRHP-listed	42°23′43″N 71°5′57″W	Somerville, Massachusetts	Shingle Style
Congregational Church (Southbridge, Massachusetts)		1885 built 1989 NRHP-listed	42°4′23″N 72°2′6″W	Southbridge, Massachusetts	Gothic
French Congregational Church		1887 built 1983 NRHP-listed	42°5′58″N 72°35′16″W	Springfield, Massachusetts	Gothic
First Church of Christ, Congregational (Springfield, Massachusetts)		1819 built 1972 NRHP-listed	42°6′3″N 72°35′23″W	Springfield, Massachusetts	Greek Revival, Federal
South Congregational Church (Springfield, Massachusetts)		1875 built 1976 NRHP-listed	42°6′8″N 72°35′1″W	Springfield, Massachusetts	William Appleton Potter-designed; Gothic
First Congregational Church (Stoneham, Massachusetts)		1840 built 1984 NRHP-listed	1 Church St. 42.48073°N 71.09996°W	Stoneham, Massachusetts	Greek Revival
Pilgrim Congregational Church (Taunton, Massachusetts)		1852 built 1984 NRHP-listed	41°54′14″N 71°5′36″W	Taunton, Massachusetts	Designed by Richard Upjohn in Romanesque style
Winslow Congregational Church		1897 built 1984 NRHP-listed	41°53′55″N 71°5′50″W	Taunton, Massachusetts	Gothic
Union Congregational Church (Taunton, Massachusetts)		1872 built 1984 NRHP-listed	41°55′10″N 71°6′20″W	Taunton, Massachusetts	Stick/Eastlake
Westville Congregational Church		1824 built 1984 NRHP-listed	41°53′8″N 71°8′17″W	Taunton, Massachusetts	Federal
First Congregational Church (Waltham, Massachusetts)		1870 built 1989 NRHP-listed	42°22′32″N 71°14′24″W	Waltham, Massachusetts	Designed by Thomas W. Silloway
Warren First Congregational Church-Federated Church		1870 built 2004 NRHP-listed	25 Winthrop Terrace; 41°31′29″N 70°40′10″W	Warren, Massachusetts	Stick/eastlake, Italianate, Queen Anne
Congregational Church of West Stockbridge		1843 built 1996 NRHP-listed	42°19′57″N 73°22′1″W	West Stockbridge, Massachusetts	Stick/Eastlake
First Congregational Church in Woburn		1860 built 1992 NRHP-listed	42°28′43″N 71°9′9″W	Woburn, Massachusetts	Italianate and Romanesque
Pilgrim Congregational Church (Worcester, Massachusetts)		1887 built 1980 NRHP-listed	42°15′7″N 71°49′8″W	Worcester, Massachusetts	Designed by Stephen C. Earle in Romanesque style
Union Congregational Church (Worcester, Massachusetts)		1895 built 1980 NRHP-listed	5 Chestnut St. 42°15′51″N 71°48′19″W	Worcester, Massachusetts	Designed by Stephen Earle & C. Fisher in Gothic Revival style
First Congregational Church (Charlotte, Michigan)		1872 built 1993 NRHP-listed	106 S. Bostwick St. 42°33′49″N 84°50′16″W	Charlotte, Michigan	Romanesque
Clare Congregational Church		1994 NRHP-listed	110 W. Fifth St. 43°49′11″N 84°46′10″W	Clare, Michigan	Early Christian Revival
First Congregational Church (Detroit, Michigan)		1891 built 1979 NRHP-listed	42°21′19″N 83°3′46″W	Detroit, Michigan	Romanesque
North Woodward Congregational Church		1911 built 1982 NRHP-listed	42°22′46.95″N 83°4′48.83″W	Detroit, Michigan	Late Gothic Revival
First (Park) Congregational Church		1868 built 1982 NRHP-listed	10 E. Park Pl., NE; 42°57′51″N 85°39′56″W	Grand Rapids, Michigan	High Victorian
First Congregational Church (Lake Linden, Michigan)		1886 built 1980 NRHP-listed	53248 N Avenue (at 1st St.); 47°11′19″N 88°24′39″W	Lake Linden, Michigan	Designed by Holabird & Roche in Stick/Eastlake style
First Congregational Church (Manistee, Michigan)		1892 built 1974 NRHP-listed	412 S. 4th St.44°14′41″N 86°19′13″W	Manistee, Michigan	Romanesque
Portland First Congregational Church		1853built 1984 NRHP-listed	421 E. Bridge St. 42°52′1″N 84°51′4″W	Portland, Michigan	Greek Revival
First Congregational Church (Richmond, Michigan)		1887 built 1975 NRHP-listed	69619 Parker; 42°48′49″N 82°45′37″W	Richmond, Michigan	Gothic Revival
First Congregational Church (Vermontville, Michigan)		1862 built 1971 NRHP-listed	341 S. Main St. 42°37′45″N 85°1′31″W	Vermontville, Michigan	
Congregational Church of Ada		1900 built 1984 NRHP-listed	E. 2nd Ave. and 1st St. 47°17′54″N 96°30′43″W	Ada, Minnesota	Bungalow/craftsman, Queen Anne
Sterling Congregational Church		1867 built 1980 NRHP-listed	43°53′55″N 94°3′25″W	Amboy, Minnesota	
First Congregational Church of Clearwater		1861 built 1979 NRHP-listed	405 Bluff Street; 45°25′10″N 94°3′4″W	Clearwater, Minnesota	Noted for its Greek Revival architecture, association with the area's New England settlers, and brief fortification after the Dakota War of 1862.
Congregational Church of Faribault		1977 NRHP-listed	227 3rd Street NW; 44°17′36″N 93°16′21″W	Faribault, Minnesota	
First Congregational Church (Minneapolis, Minnesota)		1886 built 1979 NRHP-listed	500 8th Ave., SE; 44°59′5.4″N 93°14′34.4″W	Minneapolis, Minnesota	Warren H. Hayes-designed in Romanesque style
First Congregational Church (Waseca, Minnesota)		1952 built	503 2nd Ave., NE	Waseca, Minnesota	Founded by Rev. E.H. Robert Alden in 1868. Original wooden structure building burned down in 1951.
First Congregational Church of Zumbrota		1862 built 1980 NRHP-listed	455 East Avenue; 44°17′31″N 92°40′2″W	Zumbrota, Minnesota	Greek Revival
Westminster Congregational Church		1904 built 1980 NRHP-listed	3600 Walnut St. 39°3′42″N 94°35′6″W	Kansas City, Missouri	Gothic Revival
Billings First Congregational Church		1882 founded 1957 rebuilt 2025 NRHP-listed	310 N. 27th St. 45°47′04″N 108°30′25″W	Billings, Montana	Oldest Congregationalist church congregation in Montana
Peoples' Congregational Church		1982 NRHP-listed	203 2nd Ave., SW; 47°42′53″N 104°9′33″W	Sidney, Montana	
Congregational Church of Blair		1874 built 1979 NRHP-listed	41.5410°N 96.1364°W	Blair, Nebraska	A rare example of Carpenter Gothic architecture for a Congregational church. Architect Richard Upjohn popularized this style for rural Episcopalian churches, instead.
Monroe Congregational Church and New Hope Cemetery		1881 built 1990 NRHP-listed	41°32′28″N 97°39′6″W	Monroe, Nebraska	
First Congregational Church, U.C.C.		1887 built 1982 NRHP-listed	Off NE 31C; 40°4′42″N 99°8′31″W	Naponee, Nebraska	Octagon Mode
Congregational Church and Manse		built 1972 NRHP-listed	Santee Sioux Reservation; 42°50′19″N 97°50′46″W	Santee, Nebraska	
Acworth Congregational Church		1821 built 1975 NRHP-listed	N. end of town common 43°13′8″N 72°17′38″W	Acworth, New Hampshire	Federal
First Congregational Church (Alton, New Hampshire)		1853 built 1990 NRHP-listed	Church St, W of Main St. 43°27′17″N 71°13′20″W	Alton, New Hampshire	Greek Revival
First Congregational Church (Andover, New Hampshire)		1796 built (remodeled 1840); 1989 NRHP-listed	7 Chase Hill Rd (NH Route 11), Andover, NH. 43°27′35″N 71°44′51″W	Andover, New Hampshire	Greek Revival
Congregational Church (Berlin, New Hampshire)		1882 built 1980 NRHP-listed	921 Main St. 44°28′40″N 71°10′18″W	Berlin, New Hampshire	Stick/Eastlake
First Congregational Church of Boscawen		1799 built 1982 NRHP-listed	King St. 43°19′19″N 71°37′45″W	Boscawen, New Hampshire	Greek Revival
Chester Congregational Church		1773 built 1986 NRHP-listed	4 Chester St. 42°57′28″N 71°15′27″W	Chester, New Hampshire	Greek Revival
Centre Congregational Church		1826 built 1983 NRHP-listed	Province Rd. 43°25′31″N 71°24′51″W	Gilmanton, New Hampshire	Federal
Goffstown Congregational Church		1890 built 1996 NRHP-listed	10 Main St. 43°1′10″N 71°36′3″W	Goffstown, New Hampshire	Queen Anne
First Congregational Church of Hopkinton		1757 built 1789 rebuilt	1548 Hopkinton Rd.	Hopkinton, NH	
First Congregational Church		1834 built	10 Union St. 42°50′3″N 71°39′2″W	Milford, New Hampshire	Federal
South Congregational Church (Newport, New Hampshire)		1823 built 1989 NRHP-listed	58 S. Main St. 43°21′40″N 72°10′14″W	Newport, New Hampshire	Colonial Revival, Federal
Northwood Congregational Church		1840 built 1979 NRHP-listed	US 4; 43°13′2″N 71°12′32″W	Northwood, New Hampshire	Greek Revival
Webster Congregational Church		1823 built 1985 NRHP-listed	Off NH 127 on Long St. 43°19′48″N 71°43′0″W	Webster, New Hampshire	Federal
First Congregational Church (Chester, New Jersey)		1856 built 1977 NRHP-listed	30 Hillside Road; 40°47′14″N 74°41′45″W	Chester, New Jersey	Greek Revival
Congregational Church (Montclair, New Jersey)		1920 built 1988 NRHP-listed	42 S. Fullerton Ave. 40°48′44″N 74°13′07″W	Montclair, New Jersey	Late Gothic Revival, Perpendicular Gothic
Belleville Avenue Congregational Church		1874 built 1986 NRHP-listed	151 Broadway; 40°45′19″N 74°10′12″W	Newark, New Jersey	Gothic, High Victorian Gothic
First Congregational Church of Albany		1917 built 2014 NRHP-listed	405 Quail St. 42°39′14″N 73°47′09″W	Albany, New York	Wren-Gibbs Colonial Revival
First Congregational Church of Bay Shore		1891 built 2002 NRHP-listed	1860 Union Boulevard; 40°43′33″N 73°14′46″W	Bay Shore, New York	Romanesque, Queen Anne
First Congregational Church (Berkshire, New York)		1889 built 1984 NRHP-listed	Main St. 42°18′6″N 76°11′18″W	Berkshire, New York	Gothic, Queen Anne
Congregational Church of the Evangel		2009 NRHP-listed	1950 Bedford Ave. 40°39′26.74″N 73°57′23.67″W	Brooklyn, New York	Late Gothic Revival
Immanuel Congregational Church		1898 built 2006 NRHP-listed	461 Decatur St. 40°40′57″N 73°55′30″W	Brooklyn, New York	Late 19th and 20th century Revival, Renaissance
New York Congregational Home for the Aged		1918 built 2008 NRHP-listed	123 Linden Blvd. 40°39′9″N 73°57′16″W	Brooklyn, New York	Colonial Revival
South Granville Congregational Church and Parsonage		1843 built 2005 NRHP-listed	7179 NY 149; 43°22′19″N 73°17′15″W --->	Granville, New York	Late Gothic Revival
First Congregational Church of New Village		1818 built 2002 NRHP-listed	N. side of Middle Country Rd. W. of Elliot Ave. 40°51′35″N 73°6′37″W	Lake Grove, New York	Federal
First Congregational Church and Cemetery		1812 built 2005 NRHP-listed	US 9 at Elizabethtown–Lewis Road; 44°16′40″N 73°34′5″W	Lewis, New York	Early-late 19th-century vernacular
First Congregational Church (Malone, New York)		1991 NRHP-listed	2 Clay St. 44°50′57″N 74°17′19″W	Malone, New York	Romanesque
First Congregational Church of Middletown		1872 built 2005 NRHP-listed	41°26′44″N 74°25′9″W	Middletown, New York	
Congregational Church of Patchogue		1892 built 1993 NRHP-listed	95 East Main Street; 40°45′57″N 73°0′47″W	Patchogue, New York	Romanesque
Nelson Welsh Congregational Church		1876 built 1993 NRHP-listed	42°54′7″N 75°45′17″W	Nelson, New York	Late Victorian
South Congregational Church		1851, 1857, 1889, 1893 built 1982 NRHP-listed	President and Court Sts. 40°40′55″N 73°59′47″W	Brooklyn, New York	Romanesque Revival
New England Congregational Church and Rectory		1852 built 1983 NRHP-listed	177-179 S. 9th St. 40°42′31″N 73°57′44″W	New York, New York	Italianate
West Newark Congregational Church and Cemetery		1848 built 1998 NRHP-listed	42°14′32″N 76°14′9″W	Newark Valley, New York	Greek Revival
Oneida Lake Congregational Church		1824 built 2006 NRHP-listed	2508 NY 31; 43°9′28″N 75°49′45″W	Oneida Lake, New York	Federal, Greek Revival
First Congregational Free Church		1833-45 built 1979 NRHP-listed	177 N. Main St. 42°56′25″N 75°27′38″W	Oriskany Falls, New York	
First Congregational Church of Otto		1861 built 1999 NRHP-listed	9019 Main St. 42°21′19″N 78°49′40″W	Otto, New York	Vernacular
Congregational Church (Rensselaer Falls, New York)		2005 NRHP-listed	218 Rensselaer St. 44°35′33″N 75°19′7″W	Rensselaer Falls, New York	Greek Revival
United Congregational Church of Irondequoit		1910 built 2002 NRHP-listed	644 Titus Ave. 43°12′39″N 77°35′59″W	Rochester, New York	Colonial Revival, Bungalow/Craftsman
Sayville Congregational Church		2005 NRHP-listed	131 Middle Rd. 40°44′11″N 73°4′50″W	Sayville, New York	Shingle Style
Plymouth Congregational Church		1858 built 1997 NRHP-listed	232 E. Onondaga St. 43°2′45″N 76°9′1″W	Syracuse, New York	Designed by Horatio Nelson White
Union Valley Congregational Church		c. 1849 built 2002 NRHP-listed	Union Valley Cross Rd. 42°38′1″N 75°53′0″W	Taylor, New York	Greek Revival, Gothic
First Congregational Church and Society of Volney		1832 built 2001 NRHP-listed	NY 3; 43°20′18″N 76°20′19″W	Volney, New York	Abolitionist church with early former slave members
First Congregational Church of Walton		1840s built 2015 NRHP-listed	4 Mead St. 42°10′15″N 75°7′40″W	Walton, New York	Neoclassical
First Congregational and Presbyterian Society Church of Westport		1837 built 1988 NRHP-listed	Main St./CR 10; 44°13′50″N 73°27′33″W	Westport, New York	Federal
Willsboro Congregational Church		1834 built 1984 NRHP-listed	NY 22; 44°21′49″N 73°23′35″W	Willsboro, New York	Mid-19th-century Revival
Wadsworth Congregational Church		1885 built 2002 NRHP-listed	36°2′49″N 79°35′52″W	Whitsett, North Carolina	Gothic
First Congregational Church (Mount Pleasant, North Carolina)		1918 built 1986 NRHP-listed	Corner of Wade and C Sts. 35°23′57″N 80°25′40″W	Mount Pleasant, North Carolina	Gothic Revival
Neuburg Congregational Church		1925 built 2007 NRHP-listed	46°35′16″N 102°9′24″W	Mott, North Dakota	Gothic Revival
First Congregational Church (Akron, Ohio)		1910 built 2004 NRHP-listed	292 E. Market St. 41°4′53″N 81°30′31″W	Akron, Ohio	Romanesque, Bungalow/Craftsman
Atwater Congregational Church		1818 founded 1841 built 1973 NRHP-listed	41°1′21″N 81°8′55″W	Atwater, Ohio	Greek Revival, Gothic Revival
Congregational Church Of Austinburg		1877 built 1978 NRHP-listed	OH 307; 41°46′17″N 80°51′23″W	Austinburg, Ohio	Gothic Revival
First Congregational-Unitarian Church (Cincinnati, Ohio)		1889 built 1976 NRHP-listed	2901 Reading Rd. 39°7′55″N 84°29′53″W	Cincinnati, Ohio	Designed by James W. McLaughlin in Richardsonian Romanesque style
Claridon Congregational Church		1831 built 1974 NRHP-listed	U.S. 322; 41°31′56″N 81°8′34″W	Claridon, Ohio	Greek Revival
Archwood Congregational Church		1994 NRHP-listed	2800 Archwood Ave. 41°27′10.51″N 81°42′10.28″W	Cleveland, Ohio	Colonial Revival
Pilgrim Congregational Church (Cleveland, Ohio)		1894 built 1976 NRHP-listed	2592 W. 14th St. 41°28′38″N 81°41′31″W	Cleveland, Ohio	Richardsonian Romanesque
First Congregational Church of Cuyahoga Falls		1847 built 1975 NRHP-listed	130 Broad Blvd. 41°8′0″N 81°29′4″W	Cuyahoga Falls, Ohio	Romanesque, Gothic Revival
Freedom Congregational Church		1845 built 1975 NRHP-listed	41°14′6.63″N 81°8′48.55″W	Freedom, Ohio	Greek Revival, Federal
Congregational-Presbyterian Church		1831 built 1971 NRHP-listed	Near OH 5 and 7; 41°26′53″N 80°35′6″W	Kinsman, Ohio	Greek Revival, Gothic
First Congregational Church (Lexington, Ohio)		1846 built 1979 NRHP-listed	47 Delaware St. 40°40′39″N 82°35′9″W	Lexington, Ohio	Gothic Revival
First Congregational Church (Marblehead, Ohio)		1900 built 2000 NRHP-listed	802 Prairie St. 41°32′32″N 82°44′5″W	Marblehead, Ohio	Romanesque
Oak Hill Welsh Congregational Church		1978 NRHP-listed	412 E. Main St. 38°53′44″N 82°34′9″W	Oak Hill, Ohio	
Congregational Church of Christ		1842 built 1974 NRHP-listed	W. Lorain and N. Main Sts. 41°17′40″N 82°13′6″W	Oberlin, Ohio	Greek Revival
First Congregational Church (Sandusky, Ohio)		1895 built 1982 NRHP-listed	431 Columbus Ave. 41°27′9″N 82°42′36″W	Sandusky, Ohio	Romanesque Revival
Twinsburg Congregational Church		1848 built 1974 NRHP-listed	Twinsburg Public Sq. 41°18′43″N 81°26′32″W	Twinsburg, Ohio	Greek Revival
Welsh Congregational Church		1861 built 1986 NRHP-listed	220 N. Elm St. 41°6′13″N 80°38′4″W	Youngstown, Ohio	Greek Revival, Queen Anne
Pilgrim Congregational Church		1920 built 1984 NRHP-listed	1433 N. Classen Avenue; 35°29′.24″N 97°31′37.07″W	Oklahoma City, Oklahoma	Hawk & Parr-designed in Late Gothic Revival
First Congregational Church (Corvallis, Oregon)		1917 built 1981 NRHP-listed	8th and Madison Sts. 44°33′53″N 123°15′55″W	Corvallis, Oregon	Colonial Revival, Georgian Revival
First Congregational Church (Eugene, Oregon)		1925 built 1980 NRHP-listed	492 E. 13th Ave. 44°2′44″N 123°5′3″W	Eugene, Oregon	Late 19th and 20th century Revival, Mediterranean Revival
Lake Oswego United Church of Christ		Former site 1891 built new location 1959 built	1111 Country Club Rd. 45°25′25″N 122°41′23″W	Lake Oswego, Oregon	
First Congregational Church of Oregon City		1925 built 1982 NRHP-listed	6th and John Adams Sts. 45°21′18″N 122°36′13″W	Oregon City, Oregon	Willard F. Tobey-designed, with 15 stained glass windows, in 20th-century Gothic
First Congregational Church (Portland, Oregon)		1889–95 built 1975 NRHP-listed	1126 SW Park Ave; 45°31′0″N 122°40′50″W	Portland, Oregon	Gothic, Italian Gothic
Independent Congregational Church		1835-36 built 1978 NRHP-listed	346 Chestnut St. 41°38′14″N 80°9′1″W	Meadville, Pennsylvania	Greek Revival
Central Falls Congregational Church		1883 built 1976 NRHP-listed	41°53′5″N 71°23′4″W	Central Falls, Rhode Island	Queen Anne
Beneficent Congregational Church		1743 founded 1809 built 1972 NRHP-listed	41°49′11″N 71°24′51″W	Providence, Rhode Island	Greek Revival
Central Congregational Church (Providence, Rhode Island)		1852 founded 1893 built	41°49′44″N 71°23′45″W	Providence, Rhode Island	Renaissance Revival
Newman Congregational Church		1810 built 1980 NRHP-listed	41°50′28″N 71°21′3″W	East Providence, Rhode Island	
Pawtucket Congregational Church		1867 built 1978 NRHP-listed	41°52′36″N 71°22′54″W	Pawtucket, Rhode Island	Italianate, Romanesque
United Congregational Church (Newport, Rhode Island)		1857 built 1971 NRHP-listed	Spring and Pelham Sts. 41°29′9″N 71°18′49″W	Newport, Rhode Island	A U.S. National Historic Landmark; Romanesque, Lombardic, Other
Old Congregational Church (North Scituate, Rhode Island)		1831 built 1974 NRHP-listed	41°50′3″N 71°35′14″W	North Scituate, Rhode Island	Greek Revival
Circular Congregational Church and Parish House		1806 parish house built 1892 church built 1973 NRHP-listed	150 Meeting Street; 32°46′44″N 79°55′52″W	Charleston, South Carolina	Greek Revival parish house designed by Robert Mills is a National Historic Landmark, Church, Romanesque, is not circular.
First Congregational Church (Rapid City, South Dakota)		1914 built 1984 NRHP-listed	715 Kansas City St. 44°4′45″N 103°13′47″W	Rapid City, South Dakota	Renaissance
United Church of Christ, Congregational		1909 built 1977 NRHP-listed	2nd and Main St. 44°21′13″N 100°22′29″W	Fort Pierre, South Dakota	Gothic, High Victorian Gothic
First Congregational Church of Milbank		1883 built 1978 NRHP-listed	E. 3rd Ave. 45°13′31″N 96°37′39″W	Milbank, South Dakota	Gothic, High Victorian Gothic
First Congregational Church (Sioux Falls, South Dakota)		1907 built 1983 NRHP-listed	303 S. Dakota Ave. 43°32′40″N 96°43′48″W	Sioux Falls, South Dakota	Romanesque, Richardsonian Romanesque
First Congregational Church (Turton, South Dakota)		1893 built 1979 NRHP-listed	Oak and 2nd Sts. 45°3′1″N 98°5′46″W	Turton, South Dakota	Country Gothic, other
First Congregational Church and Parish House		1992 NRHP-listed	234 S. Watkins St. 35°8′7″N 90°0′54″W	Memphis, Tennessee	
Second Congregational Church (Memphis, Tennessee)		1928 built 1982 NRHP-listed	764 Walker Ave. 35°7′10″N 90°2′11″W	Memphis, Tennessee	
Central Congregational Church		1920 built 1005 NRHP-listed	1530 N. Carroll; 32°48′7″N 96°46′43″W	Dallas, Texas	Late Gothic Revival
First Congregational Church of Bennington		1805 built 1973 NRHP-listed	42°53′0″N 73°12′48″W	Bennington, Vermont	Georgian, Federal
Second Congregational Church of Christ		1889 built 1987 NRHP-listed	Jeffersonville; 44°38′38″N 72°49′47″W	Cambridge, Vermont	Vernacular Queen Anne
Charlotte Congregational Church		1851 built 1980 State Register-listed	403 Church Hill Road; 44°18′52″N 73°14′25″W	Charlotte, Vermont	Greek Revival
Congregational Church of Chelsea		1811 built 1976 NRHP-listed	Chelsea Green; 43°59′19″N 72°26′48″W	Chelsea, Vermont	Greek Revival
Clarendon Congregational Church		1824 built 1984 NRHP-listed	Middle Rd. 43°31′6″N 72°58′16″W	Clarendon, Vermont	Federal
Enosburg Congregational Memorial Church		1870 built 2001 NRHP-listed	TH No. 2; 44°52′58″N 72°45′15″W	Enosburg, Vermont	Italianate
Grafton Congregational Church and Chapel		1833 built 1979 NRHP-listed	Main St. 43°10′24″N 72°36′42″W	Grafton, Vermont	Greek Revival, Gothic Revival
Congregational Church-Grand Isle		1853 built 2001 NRHP-listed	12 Hyde Rd. 44°43′21″N 73°17′46″W	Grand Isle, Vermont	Greek Revival, Gothic Revival
Holland Congregational Church		1844 built 1986 NRHP-listed	W. Holland Rd. 44°58′9″N 72°2′14″W	Holland, Vermont	Greek Revival
Congregational Church of Ludlow		1891 built 2004 NRHP-listed	48 Pleasant St. 43°23′49″N 72°41′50″W	Ludlow, Vermont	Shingle Style
First Congregational Church (Orwell, Vermont)		1843 built 2001 NRHP-listed	464 Main St. 43°48′15″N 73°18′3″W	Orwell, Vermont	Greek Revival
Richmond Congregational Church		1903 built 2001 NRHP-listed	Jct. of Bridge and Church St. 44°24′14″N 72°59′46″W	Richmond, Vermont	Colonial Revival
Salisbury Congregational Church		1839 built 2001 NRHP-listed	West Salisbury Rd. 43°53′49″N 73°6′10″W	Salisbury, Vermont	Greek Revival
Shoreham Congregational Church		1846 built 2001 NRHP-listed	School St. 43°53′34″N 73°18′15″W	Shoreham, Vermont	Designed by James Lamb in Greek Revival style
Sudbury Congregational Church		1807 built 1977 NRHP-listed	VT 30; 43°47′58″N 73°12′15″W	Sudbury, Vermont	Federal
First Congregational Church of Swanton		1823 built 2001 NRHP-listed	42 Academy St. 44°55′2″N 73°7′21″W	Swanton, Vermont	Italianate
First Congregational Church and Meetinghouse		1790 built 2002 NRHP-listed	Near jct. of VT 30 and VT 35; 43°2′49″N 72°40′10″W	Townshend, Vermont	Gothic Revival, Greek Revival
Williston Congregational Church		1832 built 1973 NRHP-listed	Center of Williston Village on VT 2; 44°26′20″N 73°4′23″W	Williston, Vermont	Gothic Revival
First Congregational Church of Woodstock, Vermont		1807 built 1890 rebuilt	36 Elm St. 43°37′37″N 72°31′07″W	Woodstock, Vermont	Had bell produced by Paul Revere.
First Congregational Church of Spokane		1890 built 1978 NRHP-listed	W. 311-329 4th Ave. 47°39′8″N 117°24′59″W	Spokane, Washington	Romanesque, Richardsonian Romanesque
Zion Congregational Church		1858 built 2006 NRHP-listed		Alto, Wisconsin	
First Congregational Church (Beloit, Wisconsin)		1862 built 1975 NRHP-listed	801 Bushnell St. 42°30′6″N 89°1′40″W	Beloit, Wisconsin	Greek Revival, Romanesque
Community House, First Congregational Church		1914 built 1974 NRHP-listed	310 Broadway; 44°48′19″N 91°30′22″W	Eau Claire, Wisconsin	Purcell & Elmslie-designed in Prairie School style
Fulton Congregational Church		1858 built 1976 NRHP-listed	Fulton St. 42°48′21″N 89°7′44″W	Fulton, Wisconsin	Greek Revival, Italianate
First Congregational Church (Hartland, Wisconsin)		1923 built 1986 NRHP-listed	214 E. Capitol Dr. 43°6′18″N 88°20′36″W	Hartland, Wisconsin	Late Gothic Revival, Neogothic Revival
Grand Avenue Congregational Church		1887-88 built 1986 NRHP-listed	2133 W. Wisconsin Ave.	Milwaukee, Wisconsin	Designed by E. Townsend Mix in Romanesque Revival
First Congregational Church (Platteville, Wisconsin)		1869 built 1985 NRHP-listed	80 Market; 42°44′9″N 90°28′42″W	Platteville, Wisconsin	Romanesque, vernacular Romanesque
First Congregational Church (Ripon, Wisconsin)		1868 built 1979 NRHP-listed	220 Ransom St. 43°50′42″N 88°50′26″W	Ripon, Wisconsin	E. Townsend Mix-designed in Romanesque, Romanesque Revival, other styles
Shopiere Congregational Church		1853 built 1976 NRHP-listed	42°34′14″N 88°56′17″W	Shopiere, Wisconsin	Greek Revival
First Congregational Church (Waukesha, Wisconsin)		1876 built 1992 NRHP-listed	100 E. Broadway; 43°0′24″N 88°13′17″W	Waukesha, Wisconsin	Gothic, Tudor Revival
Union Congregational Church and Parsonage		1886 built 1985 NRHP-listed	110 Bennett St. 44°20′43″N 106°41′45″W	Buffalo, Wyoming	
