= United Congregational Church =

United Congregational Church may refer to:

- United Congregational Church (Bridgeport, Connecticut), listed on the U.S. National Register of Historic Places (NRHP)
- United Congregational Church of Irondequoit, Rochester, New York, NRHP-listed
- United Congregational Church (Newport, Rhode Island), NRHP-listed
- United Congregational Church of Southern Africa, a Christian denomination headquartered in Johannesburg, South Africa
