= South Granville Congregational Church and Parsonage =

Historic church in New York, United States

- U.S. National Register of Historic Places
- Location within New York Location within the United States
- Location: 7179 NY 149, Granville, New York
- Coordinates: 43°22′19″N 73°17′15″W
- Area: 1 acre (0.40 ha)
- Built: 1843
- Architectural style: Late Gothic Revival
- NRHP reference No.: 05000442
- Added to NRHP: May 19, 2005

South Granville Congregational Church and Parsonage is a historic church and parsonage at 7179 NY 149 in Granville, New York.

It was started in 1843 and was added to the National Register in 2005.
