= Roslindale Congregational Church =

Historic church in Massachusetts, United States

- U.S. National Register of Historic Places
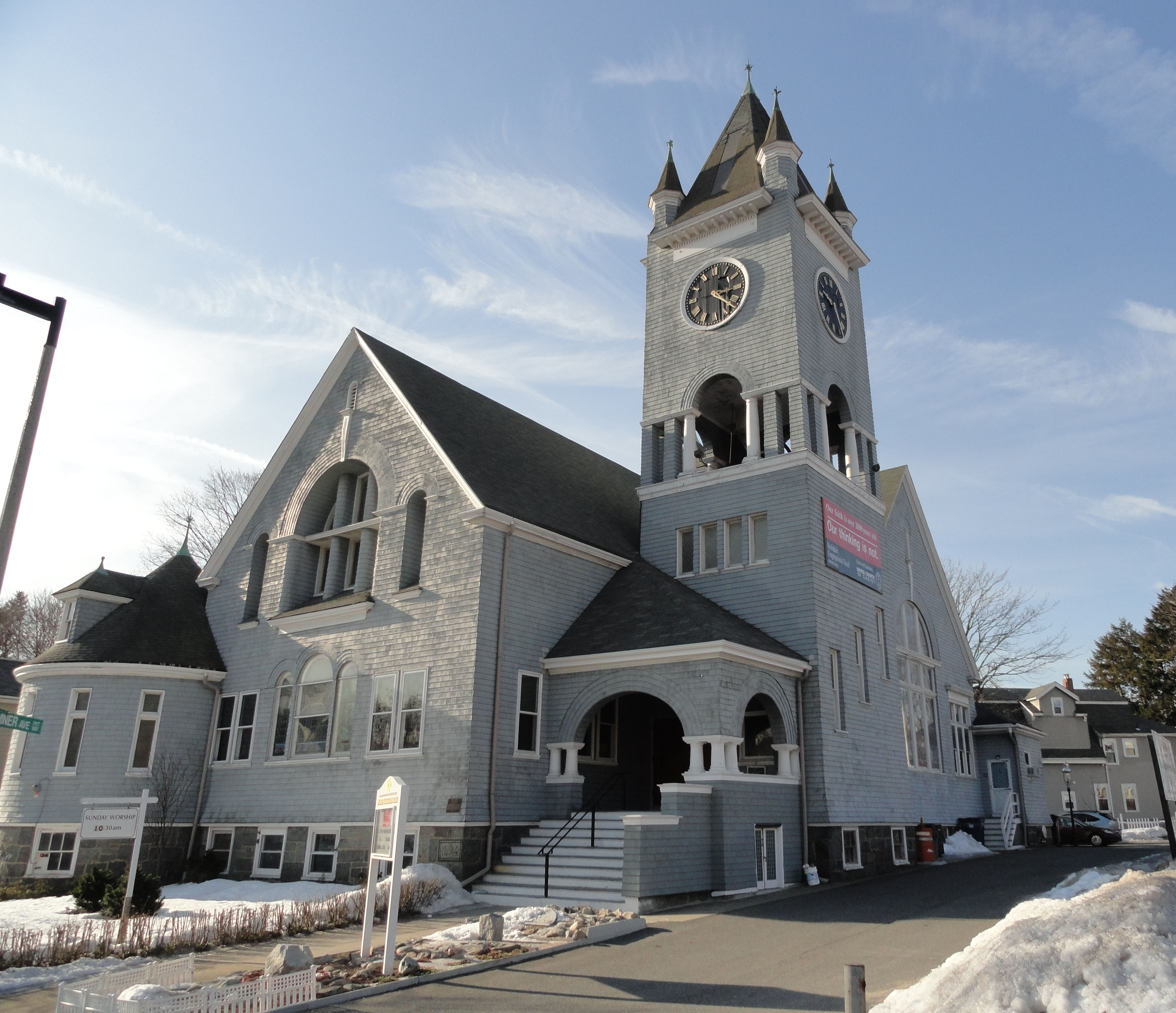
- Congregational Church; Roslindale Massachusetts

- Location within Massachusetts Location within the United States
- Location: Roslindale, Massachusetts
- Coordinates: 42°17′8.6″N 71°7′39″W
- Built: 1893
- Architect: Murray, James
- Architectural style: Shingle Style, Romanesque
- NRHP reference No.: 91000925
- Added to NRHP: July 26, 1991

Roslindale Congregational Church is a historic Congregational church at 25 Cummins Highway, at the corner of Summer Avenue in the Roslindale neighborhood of Boston, Massachusetts. The Shingle-Romanesque style church was designed by James Murray (believed to be a member of the congregation) and built 1893-96 for a congregation established in 1890 by Rev. William Grover. It has a monumental scale typical of Richardsonian works, and a tower topped by a pyramidal roof and corner turrets.

The building was listed on the National Register of Historic Places in 1991.

== See also ==
- National Register of Historic Places listings in southern Boston, Massachusetts
