= Archwood Congregational Church =

Historic church in Ohio, United States

- Archwood United Church of Christ, formerly Archwood Avenue Congregational Church
- U.S. National Register of Historic Places
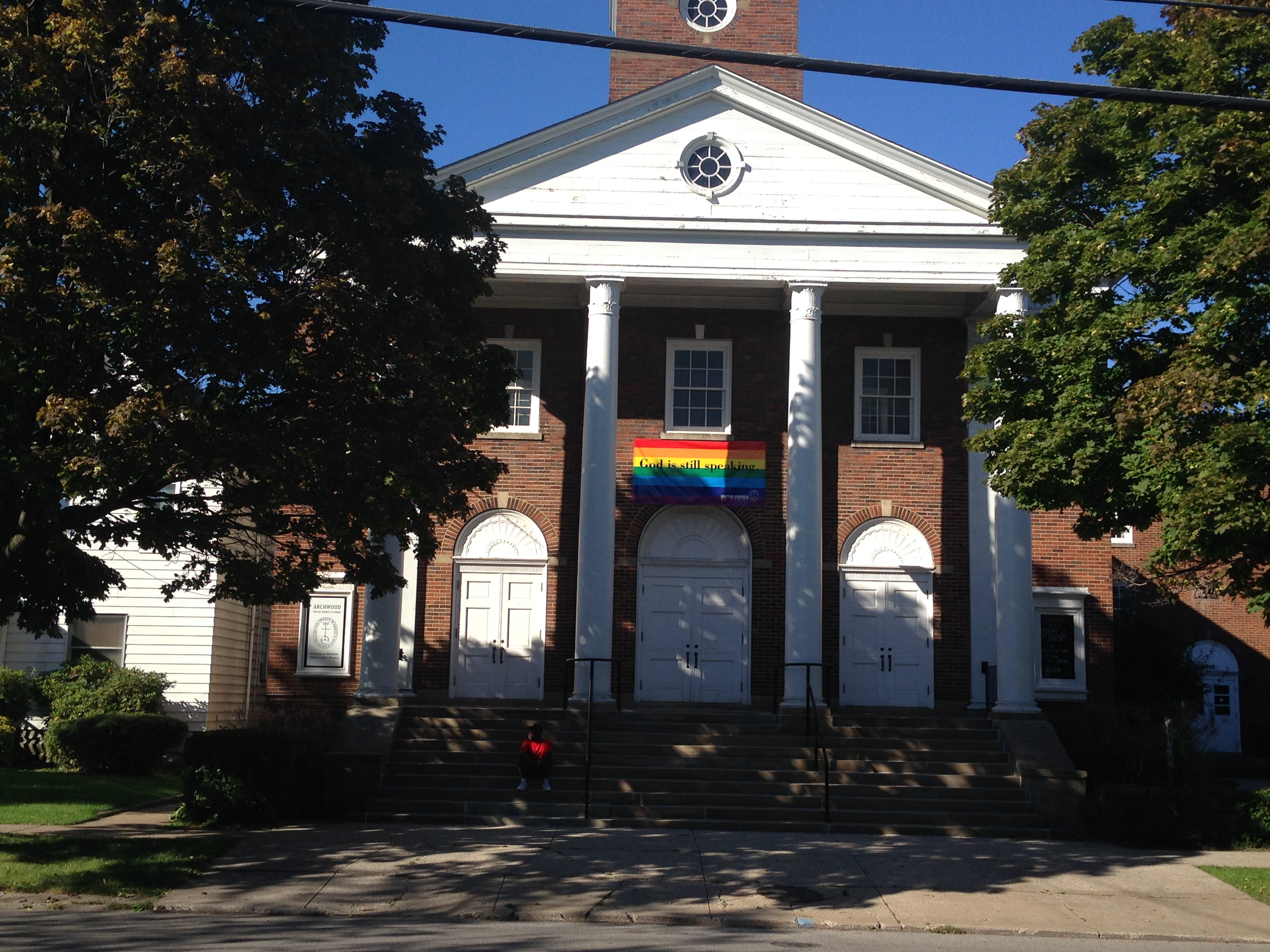

- Location within Cleveland Location within Ohio Location within the United States
- Location: 2800 Archwood Avenue, Cleveland, Ohio, U.S.
- Coordinates: 41°27′10.51″N 81°42′10.28″W
- Architect: Daniel Farnum
- Architectural style: Colonial Revival
- NRHP reference No.: 94000416
- Added to NRHP: May 13, 1994

Archwood United Church of Christ, formerly known as Archwood Avenue Congregational Church, is a church located at 2800 Archwood Avenue in the Brooklyn Centre neighborhood of Cleveland, Ohio, in the United States. The structure is the home of the Archwood United Church of Christ, one of the oldest Christian congregations in Cleveland. It was listed in the National Register of Historic Places on May 13, 1993.

The Congregational Church of Brooklyn was founded in 1819. It was affiliated with both the Congregational church movement and the Presbyterian Church in the United States of America. In 1867, the congregation had grown large enough to no longer need the support of the Presbyterians, and it affiliated fully with the Congregationalists. The congregation's first permanent place of worship was a wood-frame structure built about 1830 near the intersection of Pearl Road and Willowdale Avenue. It was moved to the intersection of Liberty Street (now W. 33rd Street) and Newburgh Road (now Denison Avenue) in 1851.

In 1879, the congregation constructed a brick church in the Late Gothic Revival style at the intersection of Greenwood Avenue (now Archwood Avenue) and Pearl Street (2794 Greenwood Avenue). By 1925 the congregation had grown so much that the 1,100 members approved construction of a new church building.

The new building, erected at 2800 Archwood Avenue next to the existing structure, was designed by local architect Daniel Farnham in the Colonial Revival style. It was completed in 1929. The sanctuary of the 1879 building was then razed. Parts of the 1879 structure still remain, to the rear of the sanctuary.

== Bibliography ==
- Rose, William Ganson (1990). Cleveland: The Making of a City. Kent, Ohio: Kent State University Press. ISBN 9780873384285.
