= Ellis Congregational Church =

Historic church in Kansas, United States

- U.S. National Register of Historic Places
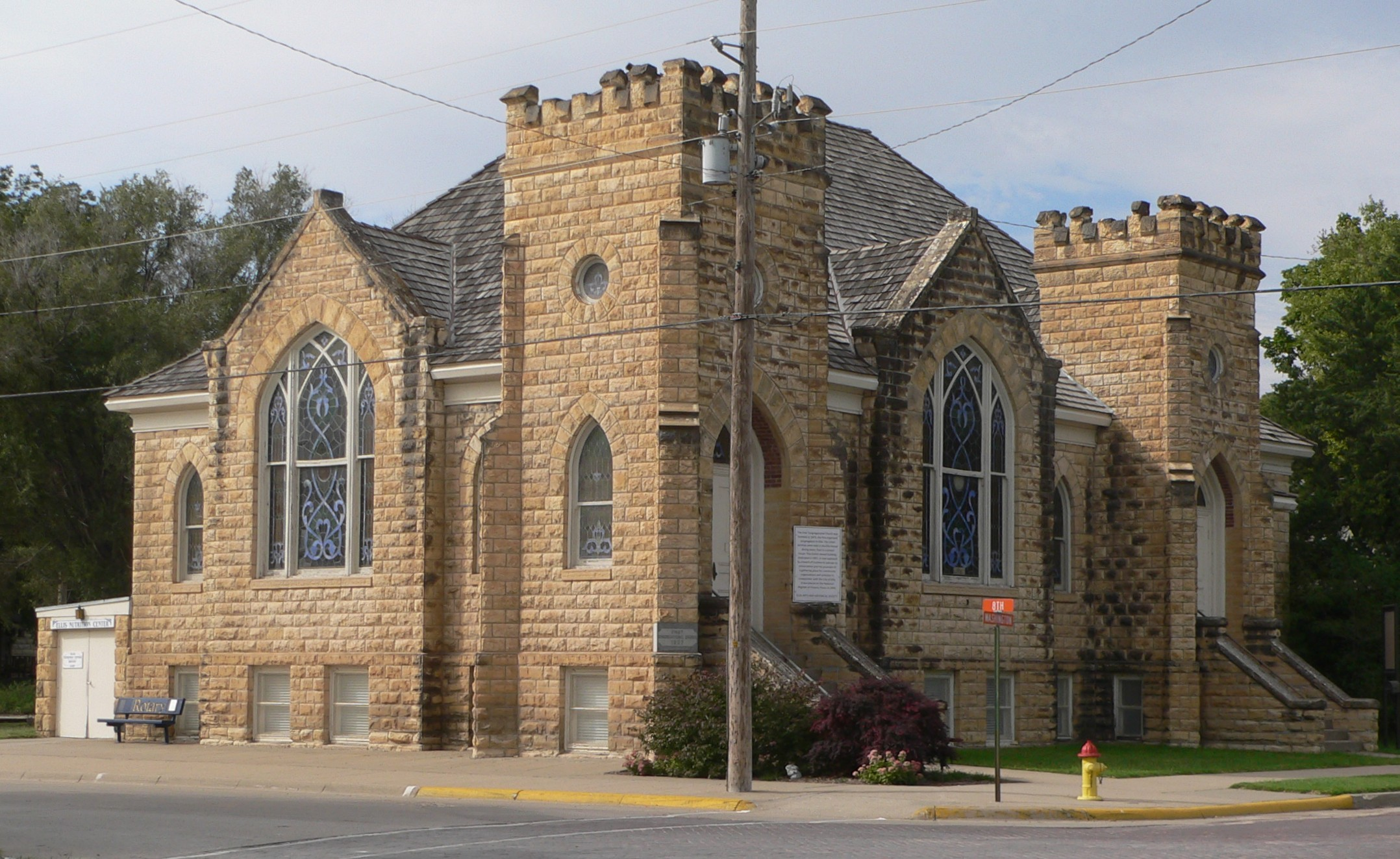
- Ellis Congregational Church in 2014

- Location within Kansas Location within the United States
- Location: Eighth and Washington Sts., Ellis, Kansas
- Coordinates: 38.940496°N 99.560574°W
- Built: 1907–08
- Architectural style: Gothic Revival
- NRHP reference No.: 00000156
- Added to NRHP: March 9, 2000

Ellis Congregational Church is a church at Eighth and Washington Streets in Ellis, Kansas. It was built in 1907–08 and added to the National Register of Historic Places in 2000.

It is a one-and-a-half-story Gothic Revival-style structural limestone course with a woodframe hipped roof.

It served as a church for 65 years, until the congregation disbanded in 1963, and was later converted into a community center. As of 1998 it served as meeting place for the Ellis Arts and Historical Society.
