= Zion Congregational Church =

Historic church in Wisconsin, United States

- U.S. National Register of Historic Places
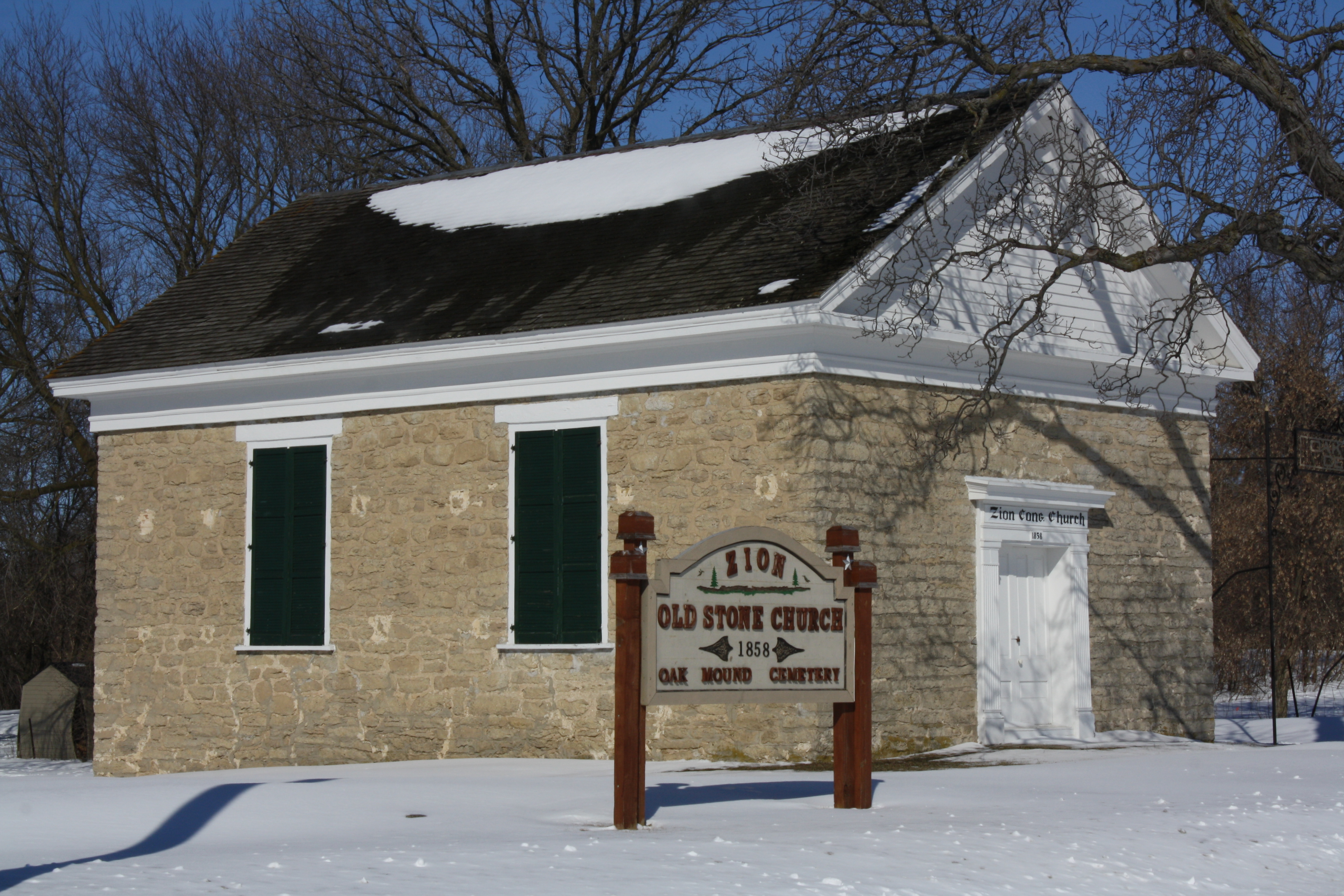
- Location: Alto, Wisconsin
- Coordinates: 43.68898°N 88.79561°W
- Built: 1858
- NRHP reference No.: 05001579
- Added to NRHP: February 1, 2006

Zion Congregational Church is located in Alto, Wisconsin. It was added to the National Register of Historic Places for its architectural significance in 2006.
