= Peoples' Congregational Church =

Historic church in Montana, United States

- U.S. National Register of Historic Places
- Location within Montana Location within the United States
- Location: 203 2nd Ave., SW; Sidney, Montana
- Coordinates: 47°42′53″N 104°09′33″W
- Area: less than one acre
- Built: 1910
- Architect: Rev. James W. Anderson
- NRHP reference No.: 82003179
- Added to NRHP: April 30, 1982

The Peoples' Congregational Church in Sidney, Montana was a church built in 1910 that was listed on the National Register of Historic Places in 1982. It was also known as Sidney Lutheran Brethren Church.

The building was designed by James W. Anderson, the first reverend of the church, and built from milled lumber brought from Mondak, Montana, a railway town. It has an "engaged 'norman tower'" which is "an infrequent feature used in this otherwise distinctive, popular church design". The church building has subsequently been torn down and replaced by a single-story commercial building.
