= Blair Congregational Church =

Historic church in Nebraska, United States

- Congregational Church of Blair
- U.S. National Register of Historic Places
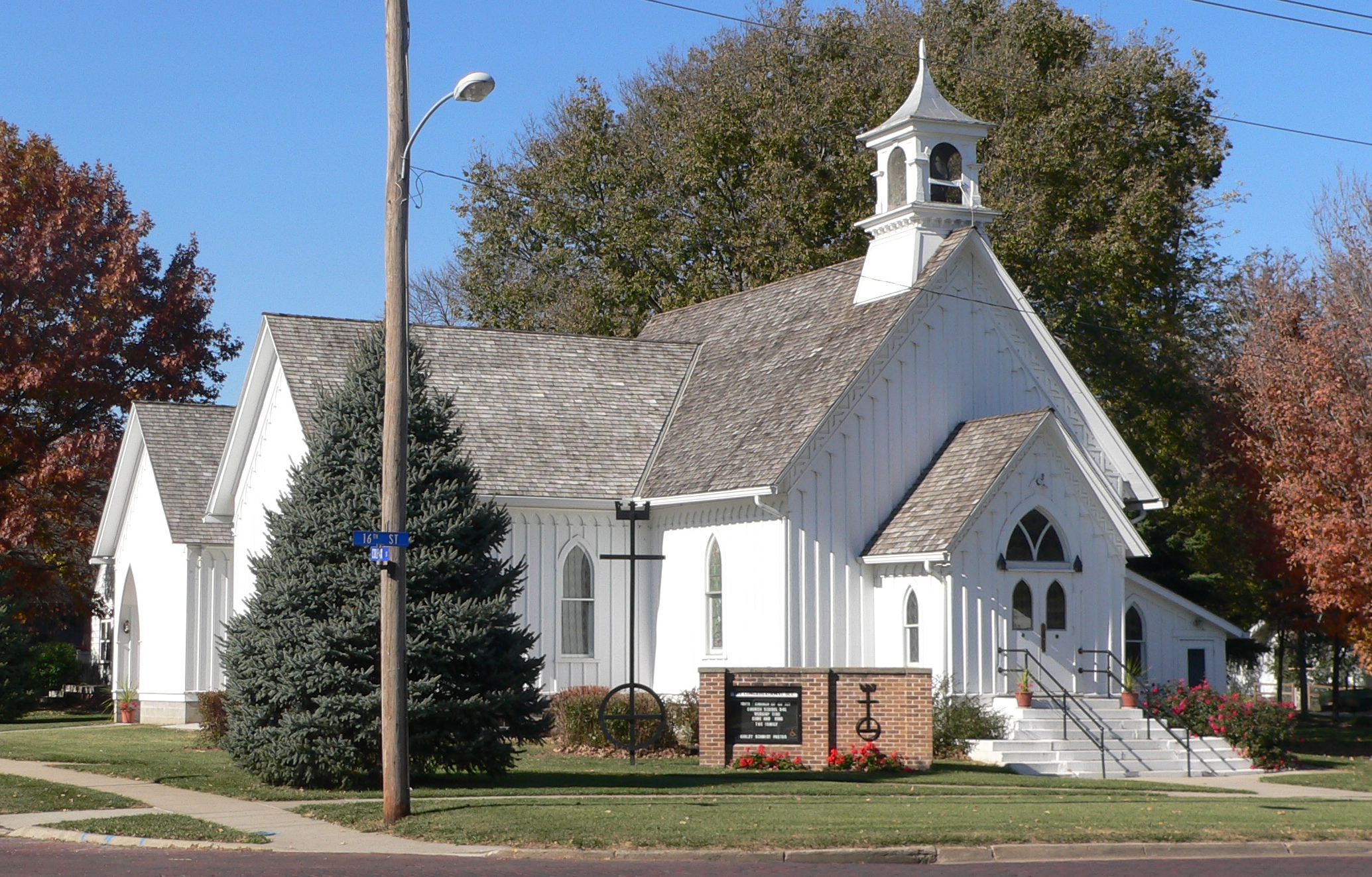

- Location within Nebraska Location within the United States
- Location: 16th and Colfax Sts., Blair, Nebraska
- Coordinates: 41.5410°N 96.1364°W
- Built: 1874
- Built by: George Sutherland
- Architect: Charles F. Driscoll
- Architectural style: Carpenter Gothic
- NRHP reference No.: 79001457
- Added to NRHP: February 1, 1979

The Blair Congregational Church in Blair, Nebraska is a Carpenter Gothic church that has been listed on the National Register of Historic Places since 1979. It is affiliated with the United Church of Christ.

The church was founded in 1870. The building was constructed in 1874 by local builder George Sutherland, according to a design by Omaha architect Charles F. Driscoll whose plans won out over architect A. Roberts, each of whom received $25 for their submissions. Carpenter Gothic style is rare in the state, and this is believed to be the only non-Episcopalian church example. (Architect Richard Upjohn popularized the style for rural Episcopalian churches.) It was renovated and extended in 1884, 1908, and 1957.

Driscoll also designed the NRHP-listed Ideal Steam Laundry, in Fremont, Nebraska.
