= Congregational Church (Southbridge, Massachusetts) =

Historic church in Massachusetts, United States

- Elm Street Congregational Church
- U.S. National Register of Historic Places
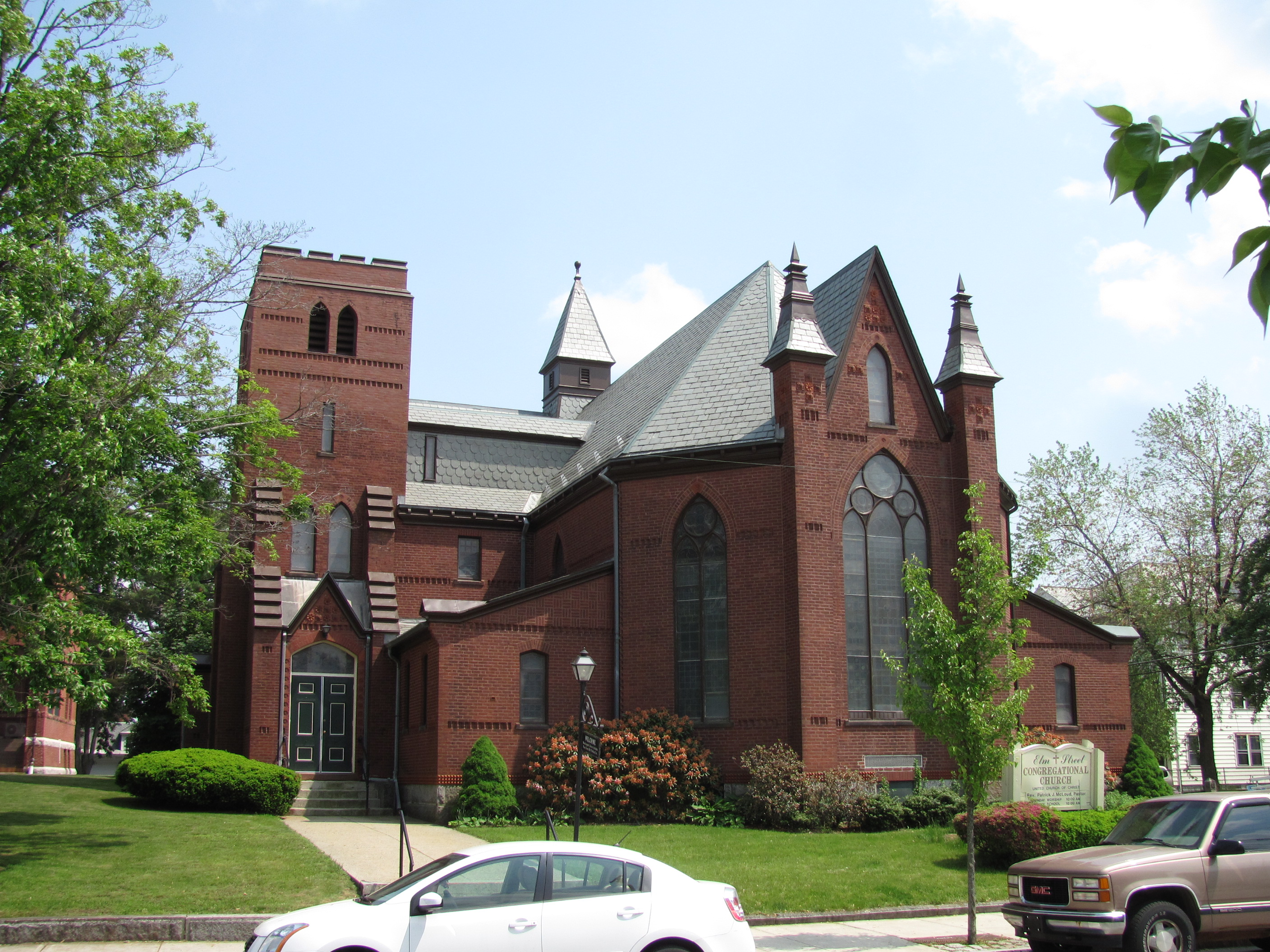
- Elm StreetCongregational Church

- Location within Massachusetts Location within the United States
- Location: 61 Elm Street, Southbridge, Massachusetts
- Coordinates: 42°4′23″N 72°2′6″W
- Built: 1885
- Architectural style: Gothic
- MPS: Southbridge MRA
- NRHP reference No.: 89000591
- Added to NRHP: June 22, 1989

The Elm Street Congregational Church is a historic church in Southbridge, Massachusetts. Built in 1885, it is a high quality local example of high Victorian Gothic Revival architecture executed in brick. It was added to the National Register of Historic Places in 1989. The congregation, founded in 1801, is affiliated with the United Church of Christ.

== Architecture and history ==
The Elm Street Congregational Church is set on the east side of Elm Street, just south of Main Street and opposite Dresser Street. It is a single-story brick structure with elaborate high Victorian styling, oriented with its long side perpendicular to the street, and its main entrance in the transept near its far end. It has a steeply pitched roof with flanking pinnacles, decorative brickwork, and Gothic-arched stained glass windows. Its tower, located at the northeast corner, is square with buttressed sides, but lacks its upper stages, which were blown down in the 1938 New England hurricane and have not been replaced. The church is the only one of its type in the city, but is built of brick compatible with other nearby civic buildings.

The congregation was established in 1801, separating from the town's first congregation, which was interdenominational. It first met in a hall built on the site of the old parish house in 1801, until a new church was built in 1822 at the present location. In 1884 that building's steeple was blown into the roof by a storm, and the present building was built to replace it the following year. The new building was built at a cost of $17,500 and dedicated on September 4, 1885.

The minister is the Reverend Kathryn Light. The church is a member of the United Church of Christ.

== See also ==
- National Register of Historic Places listings in Southbridge, Massachusetts
- National Register of Historic Places listings in Worcester County, Massachusetts
