= New York Congregational Home for the Aged =

- U.S. National Register of Historic Places
- New York State Register of Historic Places
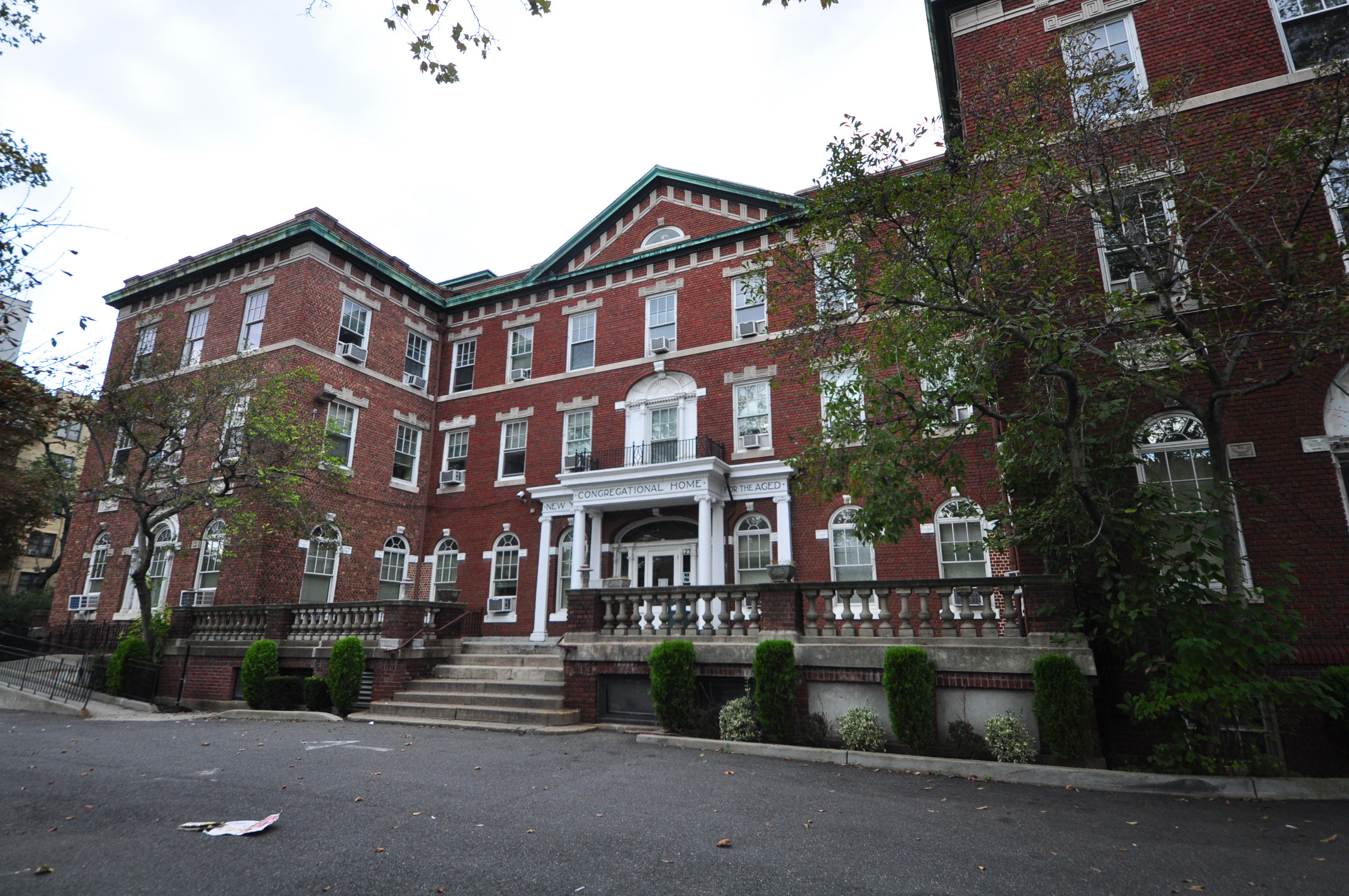
- September 2012

- Location within New York City Location within New York Location within the United States
- Location: 123 Linden Blvd., Brooklyn, New York
- Coordinates: 40°39′9″N 73°57′16″W
- Area: less than one acre
- Built: 1918
- Architect: Parfitt, William A.
- Architectural style: Colonial Revival
- NRHP reference No.: 08001033
- NYSRHP No.: 04701.013952

Significant dates
- Added to NRHP: November 5, 2008
- Designated NYSRHP: September 18, 2008

New York Congregational Home for the Aged, also known as New York Congregational Center for Community Life, was a historic care facility associated with the Congregational church at 123 Linden Boulevard in Flatbush, Brooklyn, New York, New York. It was a three-story brick institutional building in the Colonial Revival style. It was built in three stages; the center section and east pavilion in 1918, west pavilion in 1921, and west wing in 1927. It was listed on the National Register of Historic Places in 2008.

In 2017, the main building was demolished and is now the site of PLG Luxury Apartments.
