= Immanuel Congregational Church =

Church in Brooklyn, New York

- U.S. National Register of Historic Places
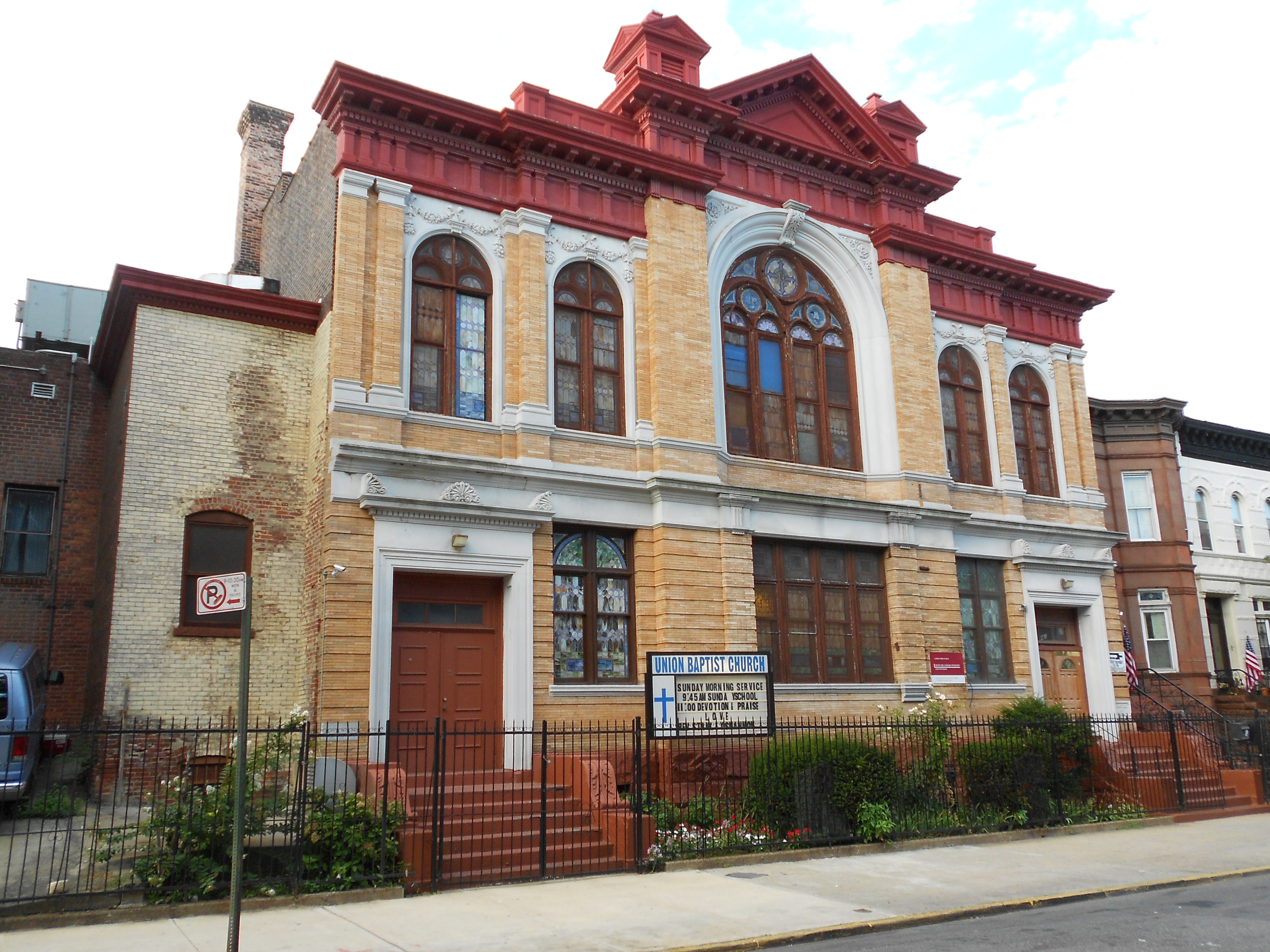

- Location within New York City Location within New York Location within the United States
- Location: 461 Decatur St., Brooklyn, New York
- Coordinates: 40°40′57″N 73°55′30″W
- Area: less than one acre
- Built: 1898
- Architect: Hedman, Axel S.
- Architectural style: Late 19th And 20th Century Revivals, Renaissance
- NRHP reference No.: 06000479
- Added to NRHP: June 7, 2006

Immanuel Congregational Church, also known as St. Mark's Congregational Church and known since 1945 as Union Baptist Church, is a historic Congregational church at 461 Decatur Street in Bedford-Stuyvesant, Brooklyn, New York, New York. It was built in 1898 and is a two-story masonry building in the Neo-Renaissance style. The front facade is faced in yellow Roman brick. It measures approximately 90 feet wide and 100 feet deep.

It was listed on the National Register of Historic Places in 2006.
