= Pilgrim Congregational Church (Arkansas City, Kansas) =

Historic church in Kansas, United States

- U.S. National Register of Historic Places
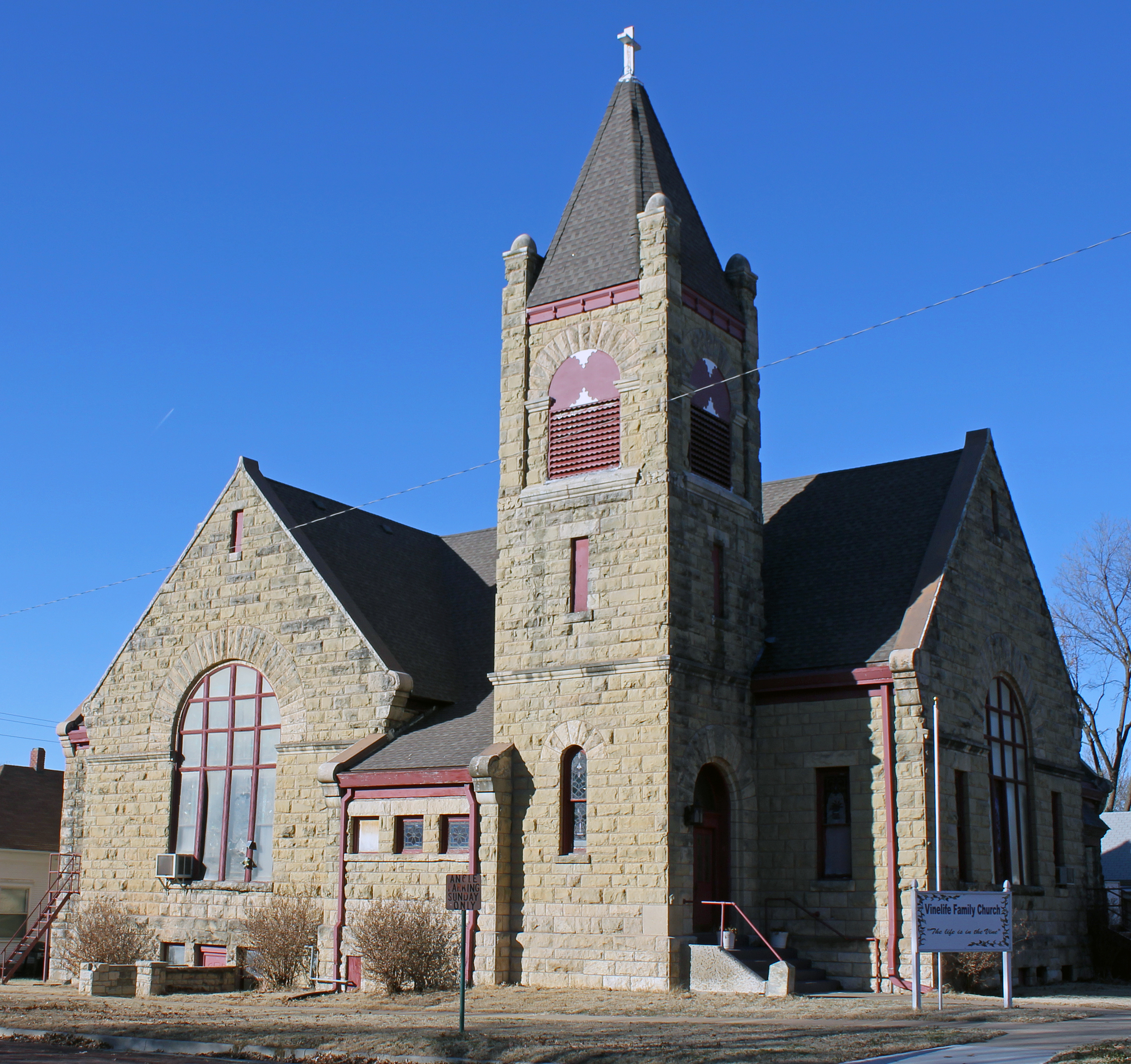

- Location within Kansas Location within the United States
- Location: 101 N. Third St., Arkansas City, Kansas
- Coordinates: 37°03′45″N 97°02′33″W
- Area: less than one acre
- Built: 1891-93
- Architectural style: Richardsonian Romanesque
- NRHP reference No.: 05000545
- Added to NRHP: June 8, 2005

The Pilgrim Congregational Church in Arkansas City, Kansas is a Richardsonian Romanesque-style church at 101 N. Third Street. It has also been known as Church of the Nazarene. It was built during 1891-93 and was added to the National Register of Historic Places in 2005.

It is built of sandstone walls with limestone used for trim, on an above-ground limestone foundation. Its roof has five gables; the gable ends have parapets with metal caps and limestone cornices. A bell tower is 78 feet (24 m) tall.
