= German Evangelical Immanuel Congregational Church =

Historic church in Colorado, United States

- U.S. National Register of Historic Places
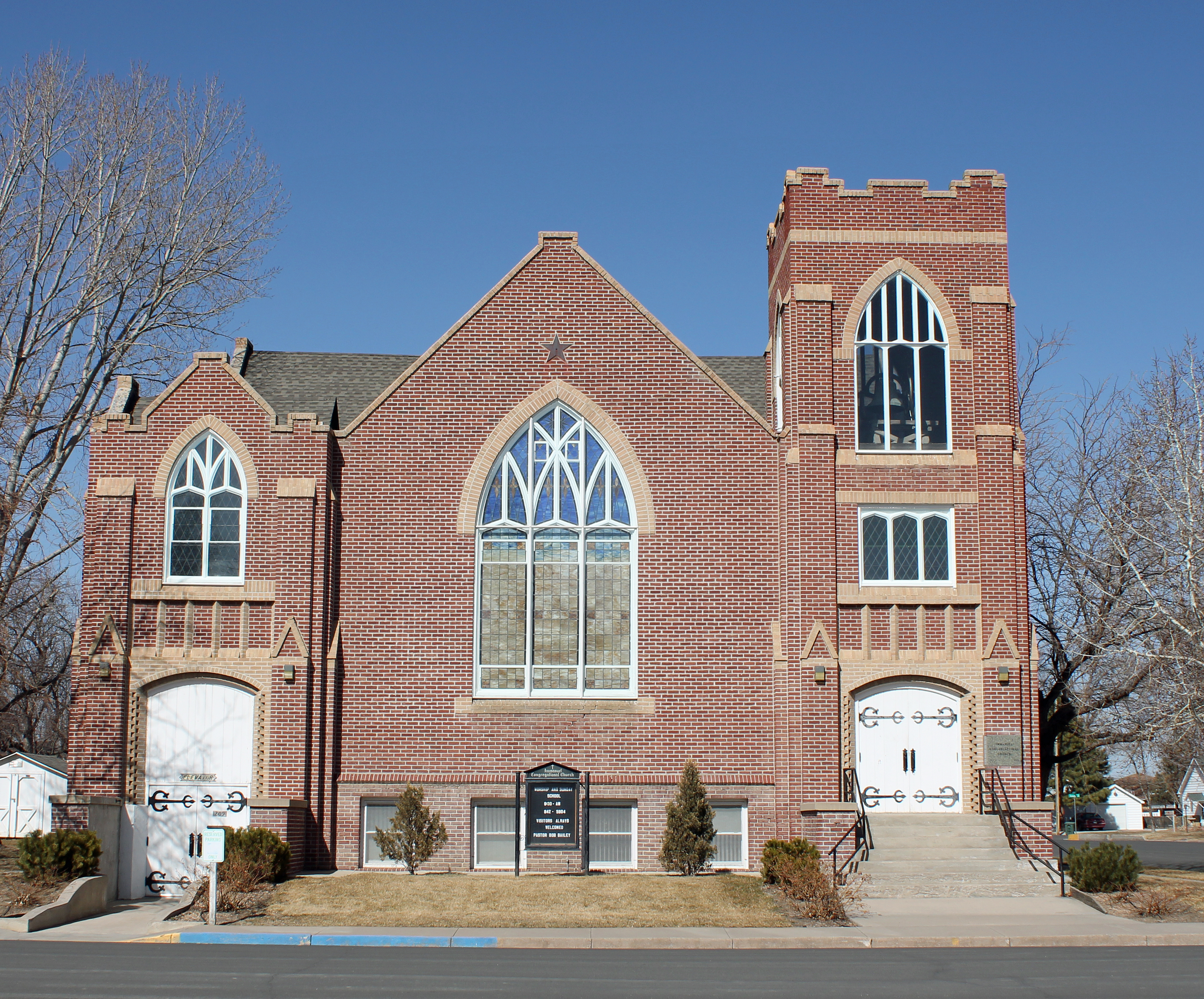

- Location within Colorado Location within the United States
- Location: 209 Everett St., Brush, Colorado
- Coordinates: 40°15′35″N 103°37′13″W
- Area: less than one acre
- Built: 1927
- Built by: Frank M. Kenney
- Architect: Walter A. Simon
- Architectural style: Late Gothic Revival
- NRHP reference No.: 05001161
- Added to NRHP: October 14, 2005

The German Evangelical Immanuel Congregational Church (Immanuel Congregational Church; Immanuel Congregational United Church of Christ) in Brush, Colorado is a historic church at 209 Everett Street. It was built in 1927 and was added to the National Register in 2005.

It was deemed notable " for its architectural significance. The church embodies the distinctive characteristics of the Late Gothic Revival style of architecture, including its brick construction, two corner towers with decorative corner pilasters, pointed arch windows, two slightly recessed entrances, and its steeply-pitched cross-gable roof. The building is also architecturally significant because it was designed by Denver architect, Walter H. Simon and to a lesser degree because it was constructed under the direction of Frank M. Kenney, a well-known Colorado building contractor."
