= Welsh Congregational United Church of Christ =

- First Welsh Congregational Church
- U.S. National Register of Historic Places
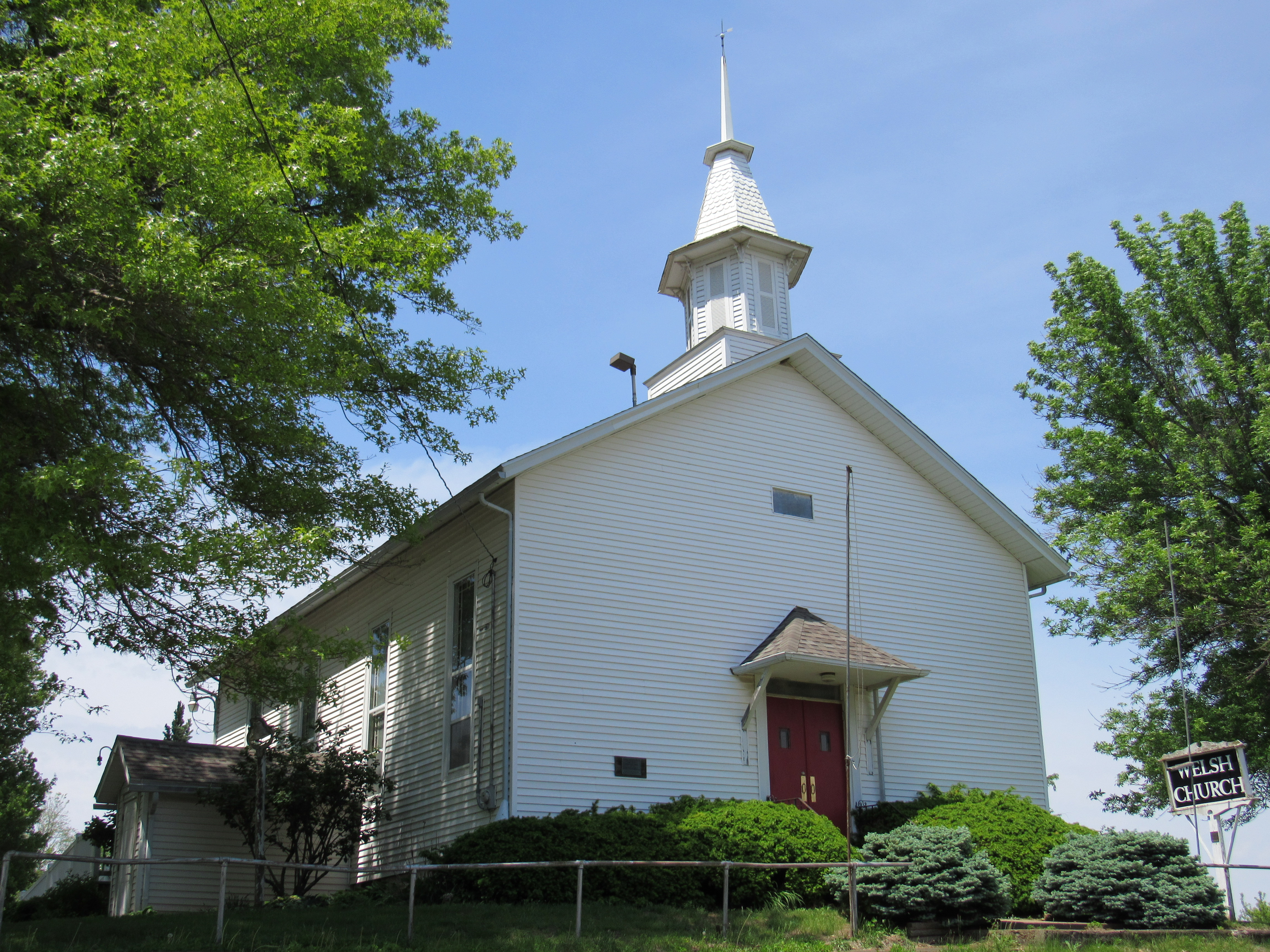

- Location within Iowa Location within the United States
- Location: 5 miles (8.0 km) southwest of Iowa City off Iowa Highway 1
- Coordinates: 41°36′47.3″N 91°36′33.8″W
- Area: 1 acre (0.40 ha)
- Built: 1887
- NRHP reference No.: 77000528
- Added to NRHP: April 13, 1977

Welsh Congregational United Church of Christ, formerly known as First Welsh Congregational Church, is located in a rural area southwest of Iowa City, Iowa, United States. It was listed on the National Register of Historic Places in 1977.

== History ==
The first sermon associated with the church was in the home of John Griffith in September 1845, and it is believed to be the first Welsh church "in the whole region west of the Mississippi River", according to a 1905 account in the Columbus Gazette. The congregation was founded as a Congregational church the following year, also in the Griffith home. In 1848 they acquired the same house and remodeled it for their meeting house. The cemetery in the church yard was established in 1851. The meeting house served their needs until their first church building was constructed in 1864. The old building was sold and converted into a horse barn. This congregation is the mother church of two other Welsh congregations. The Iowa City congregation was founded in 1849, and the Williamsburg, Iowa congregation was founded over a dispute about the use of Welsh during services. Owen Evans led those that advocated for English services to found the Williamsburg congregation around 1860.

The present church was completed in 1887 for $1,828.56 and it was consecrated debt-free. For over 50 years it was the location for the annual meeting of the Welsh Congregational Church Association, known as the Gymanfa. It was also the site for an annual Eisteddfod, a festival of oratory, poetry, and musical contests. The congregation continued to worship here until 1954 when it disbanded because of a decline in membership. The closure was only temporary as efforts were begun in 1963 to re-establish the congregation. It is now associated with the United Church of Christ.

== Architecture ==
The church is located on a rise above a county highway. It is a simple frame building that rests on a concrete foundation. There are four stained glass windows on the side walls. On the roof above the main entrance is a spire that rests on a square base and a hexagonal drum. To the north of the church building is the cemetery.
