= Westville Congregational Church =

Historic church in Massachusetts, United States

- U.S. National Register of Historic Places
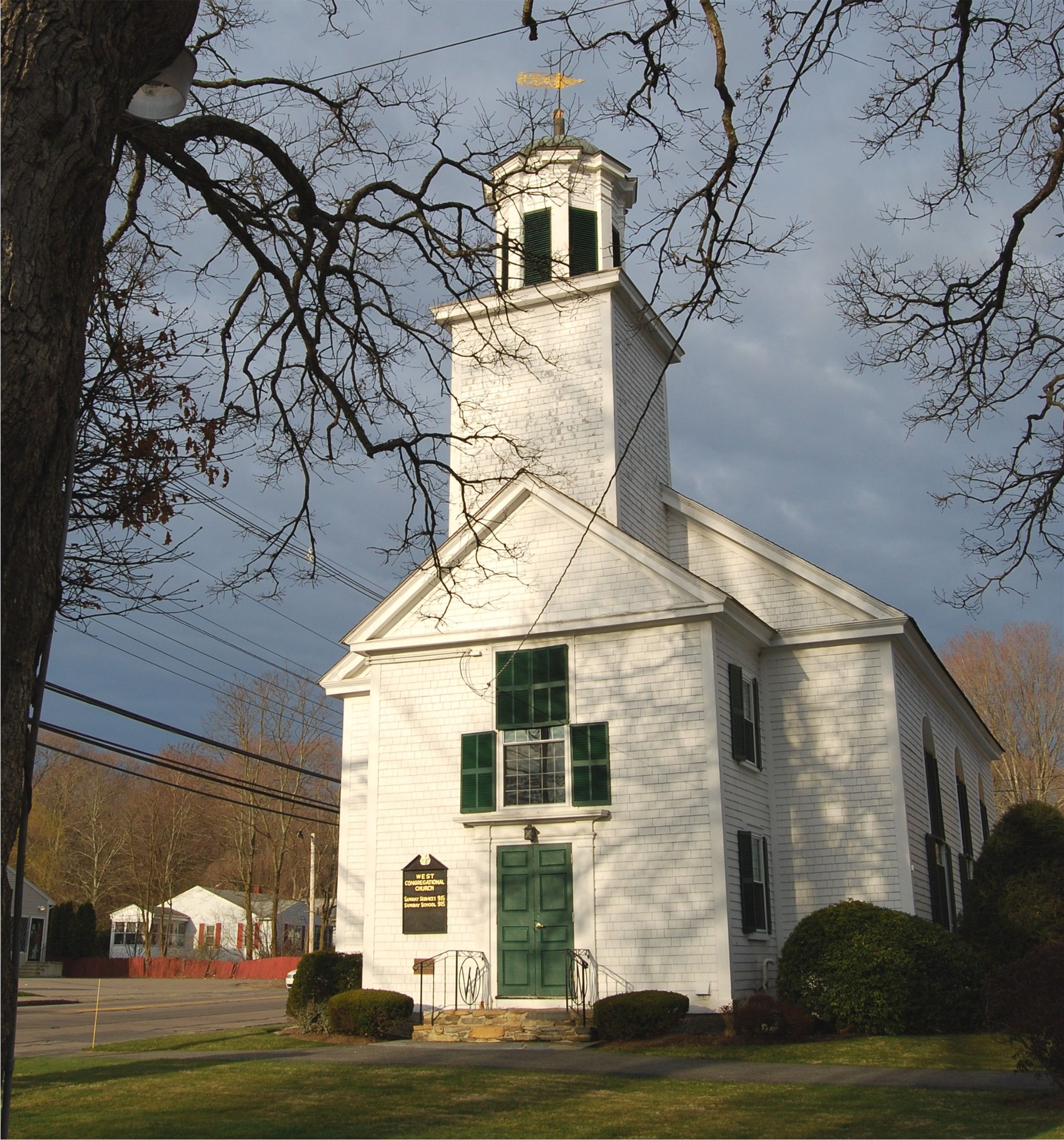

- Location within Massachusetts Location within the United States
- Location: Taunton, Massachusetts
- Coordinates: 41°53′8″N 71°8′17″W
- Built: 1792
- Architectural style: Federal
- MPS: Taunton MRA
- NRHP reference No.: 84002266
- Added to NRHP: July 5, 1984

The West Congregational Church of Taunton, formerly the Westville Congregational Church, is a historic church located at 415 Winthrop Street in Taunton, Massachusetts. Built in 1792 and moved to its present location in 1824, it is the city's oldest church building, and a well-preserved example of Federal period architecture.

The building was listed on the National Register of Historic Places in 1984.

== Description and history ==
The West Congregation Church is located in the center of Westville village on the west side of Taunton, at the northwest corner of Winthrop and North Walker Streets. It is a single-story rectangular wood frame structure, with a gable roof and clapboard siding. An entry vestibule projects from the east-facing front facade, topped by a gable roof and a square tower topped by an octagonal belfry and cupola. The main entry is framed by pilasters and topped by a cap-molded entablature.

The West Congregational Society was organized in 1792 by dissenters from the First Parish Church, and built this meeting house in Oakland village at the corner of Glebe and Oakland Streets. In 1824 the building was disassembled and moved to the present location, on land purchased from John West, owner of the local mill. It is the city's oldest surviving church building, and a fine example of a Federal period church.

== See also ==
- National Register of Historic Places listings in Taunton, Massachusetts
