= North Rochester Congregational Church =

Historic church in Massachusetts, United States

- U.S. National Register of Historic Places
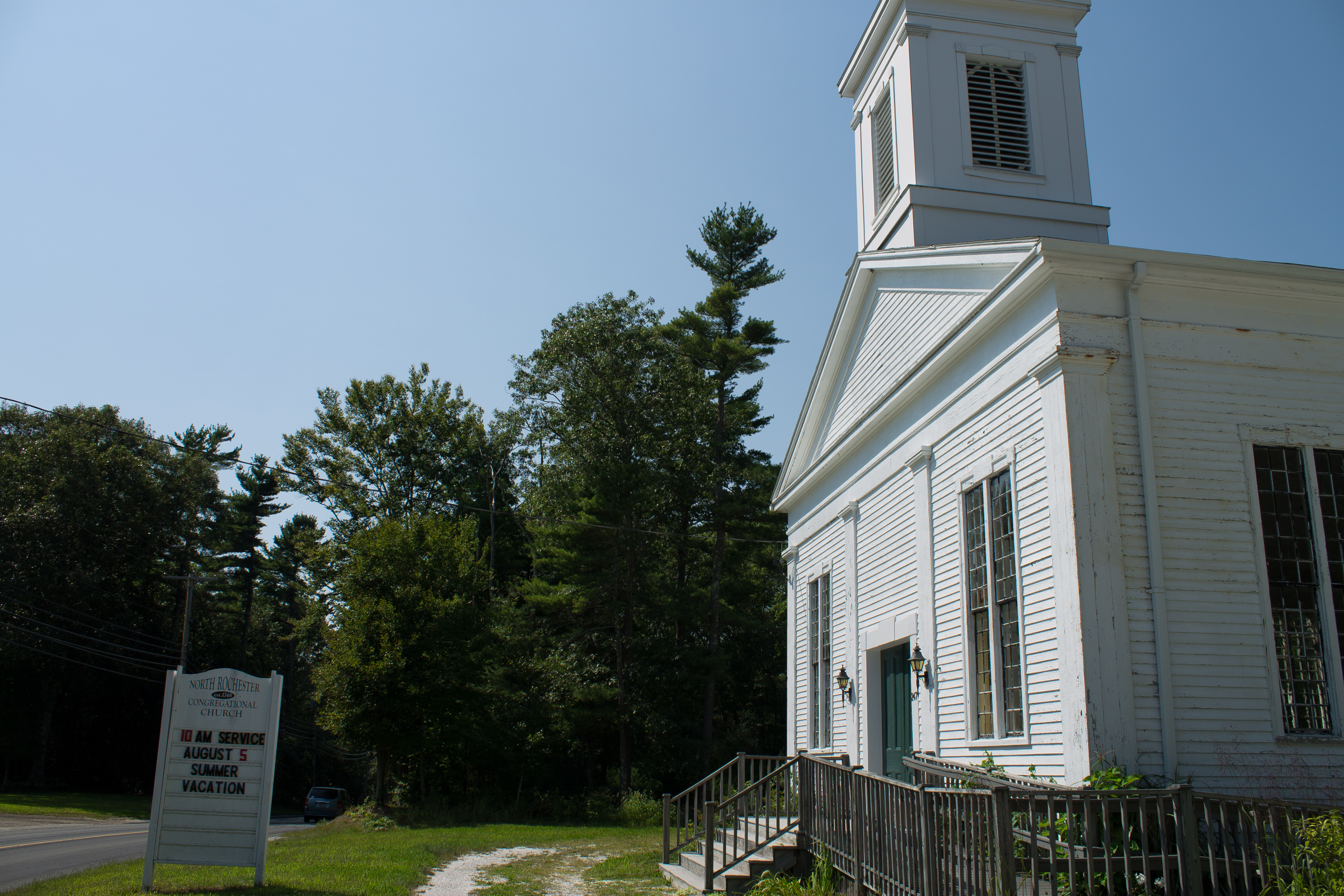

- Location within Massachusetts Location within the United States
- Location: Rochester, Massachusetts
- Coordinates: 41°46′57″N 70°53′39″W
- Area: 1 acre (0.40 ha)
- Built: 1841
- Architect: Eaton, Solomon K.
- Architectural style: Greek Revival
- NRHP reference No.: 07001400
- Added to NRHP: March 21, 2008

North Rochester Congregational Church is a historic Congregational church at 247 North Avenue in Rochester, Massachusetts. Built in 1841 for a congregation established in 1790, it is a high quality example of Greek Revival architecture. The church was listed on the National Register of Historic Places in 2008.

== Description and history ==
The North Rochester Congregational Church is located on the north side of North Avenue, a major east–west route across the northern part of the town. The setting is rural, with pockets of residential housing nearby. The church is a rectangular wood frame structure, 1 1/2 stories in height, with a front-facing gable roof, clapboard siding, and a modern concrete foundation. The front (south-facing) facade is symmetrically arranged, with three bays articulated by Doric pilasters and a fully pedimented gable above an entablature that encircles the building. The outer bays are filled with tall, paired sash windows, with the main entrance in the center bay. The side facades have three windows similar to those on the front. The interior has a vestibule area at the rear, with stairs leading up to a gallery and down to the basement, and most of the building is taken up by the main hall. An L-shaped raised platform occupies the northern part of the space, with a combination of open and box pews on the main floor. The basement houses modern amenities, including bathrooms, a kitchen, and meeting space.

North Rochester's first church was built in 1748, about 1 mile (1.6 km) west of the present building, and was served by traveling ministers from other communities. The church congregation was formally organized in 1790, and a new church was built at that time. The current church building was built in 1841 by Solomon K. Eaton, a noted regional builder whose credits include several other area churches. One of the congregation's notable early 19th-century members was Marcus Morton, a three-time Governor of Massachusetts. The congregation, given its small numbers and rural character, frequently struggled financially, and stopped supporting a full-time minister in 1916. Although periodically revived, the congregation struggled throughout the 20th century, with no services held for a roughly twenty-year period in 1970. The building began to decay, and was invaded by raccoons. In 1990 it was again revived, and the building underwent a sensitive restoration that included moving it onto a new foundation. Its interior has had relatively minor alterations since its construction: notable alterations are a reduction in the number of box pews and the introduction of an organ and electrical fixtures.

== See also ==
- National Register of Historic Places listings in Plymouth County, Massachusetts
