= Fairmount Congregational Church =

Historic church in Kansas, United States

- U.S. National Register of Historic Places
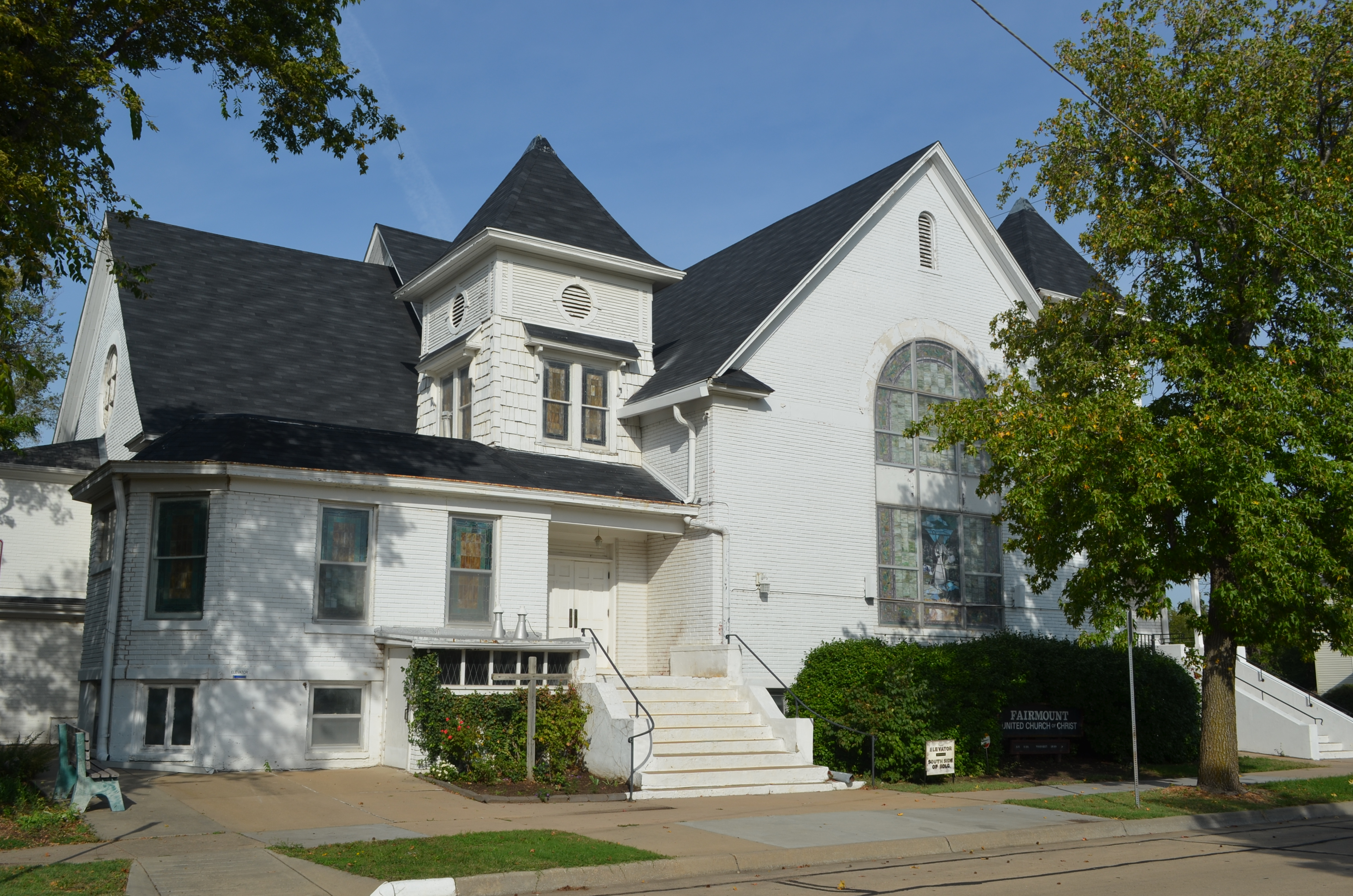
- Fairmount Congregational Church in 2012

- Location within Kansas Location within the United States
- Location: 1650 N. Fairmont, Wichita, Kansas
- Coordinates: 37°42′55″N 97°17′48″W
- Area: Less than one acre
- Built: 1910
- Architect: William R. Stringfield
- Architectural style: Romanesque
- NRHP reference No.: 06000963
- Added to NRHP: November 1, 2006

The Fairmount Congregational Church in Wichita, Kansas, was a historic church at 1650 N. Fairmont. Its building was built in 1910 and added to the National Register in 2006.

It is Richardsonian Romanesque in style. When it was built in 1910, its south wing incorporated an earlier church on the site, the Mayflower Congregational Church, which had been built in 1887 and had been moved to this site in 1907.

In 2019, after years of declining attendance and deferred maintenance, the congregation closed. In 2020, the building was sold to a developer who intended to turn it into a nonprofit community center. In 2022, efforts to dispose of the building's stained glass windows were blocked by local authorities.
