= Congregational Church of the Evangel =

Church in Brooklyn, New York

- U.S. National Register of Historic Places
- New York State Register of Historic Places
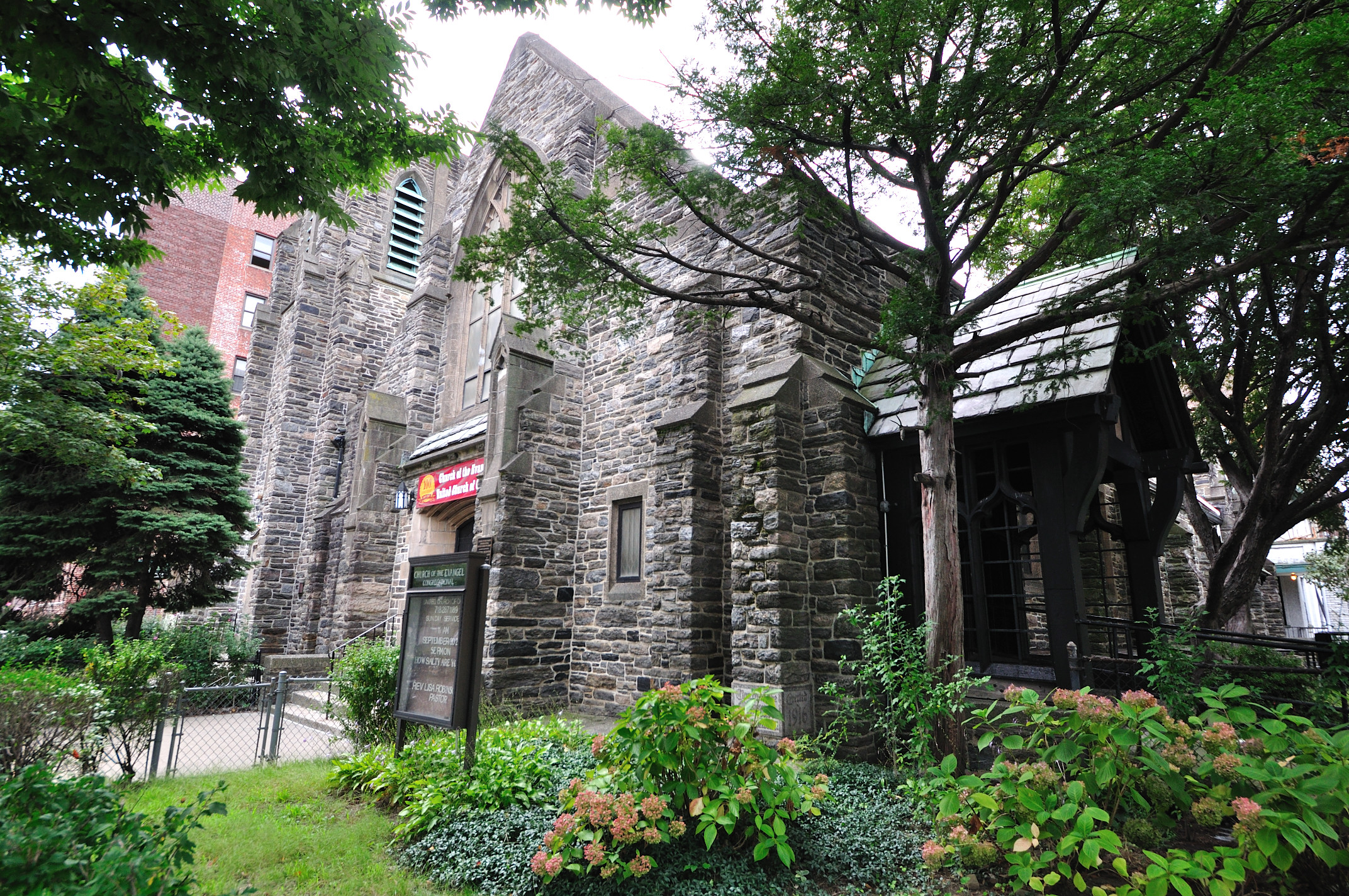
- September 2012

- Location within New York City Location within New York Location within the United States
- Location: 1950 Bedford Ave., Brooklyn, New York
- Coordinates: 40°39′26.74″N 73°57′23.67″W
- Area: Less than one acre
- Architectural style: Late Gothic Revival
- NRHP reference No.: 09001081
- NYSRHP No.: 04701.016467

Significant dates
- Added to NRHP: December 11, 2009
- Designated NYSRHP: October 23, 2009

Congregational Church of the Evangel is a historic Congregational church at 1950 Bedford Ave. in Flatbush, Brooklyn, New York City. It was built in 1916-1917 and is an asymmetrically massed Late Gothic Revival style building. It is constructed of gray-green random quarry faced ashlar with cast stone trim, a variegated slate roof, copper gutters, and stained and leaded glass windows. The building consists of a nave with steeply pitched gable roof, low sidewall with engaged buttresses, a gabled side porch, a square bell tower, and a small gabled office annex. The chancel's elaborate furnishings and Tiffany glass windows were installed in 1927.

It was listed on the National Register of Historic Places in 2009.
