= Wollaston Congregational Church =

Historic church in Massachusetts, United States

- U.S. National Register of Historic Places
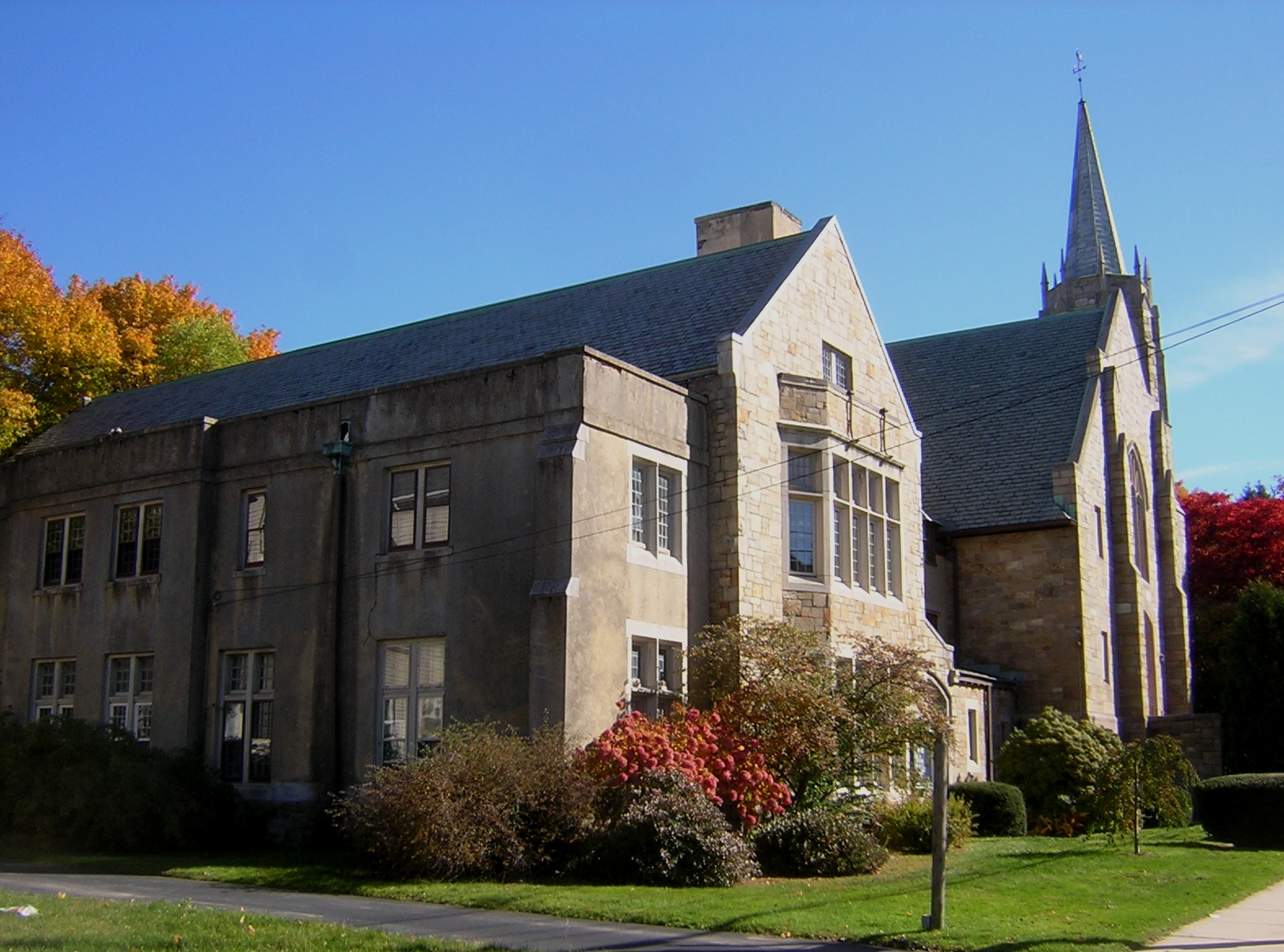

- Location within Massachusetts Location within the United States
- Location: 45-57 Lincoln Avenue, Wollaston, Massachusetts
- Coordinates: 42°15′45.7″N 71°1′12″W
- Built: 1926
- Architect: Smith & Walker
- MPS: Quincy MRA
- NRHP reference No.: 08001128
- Added to NRHP: 2008

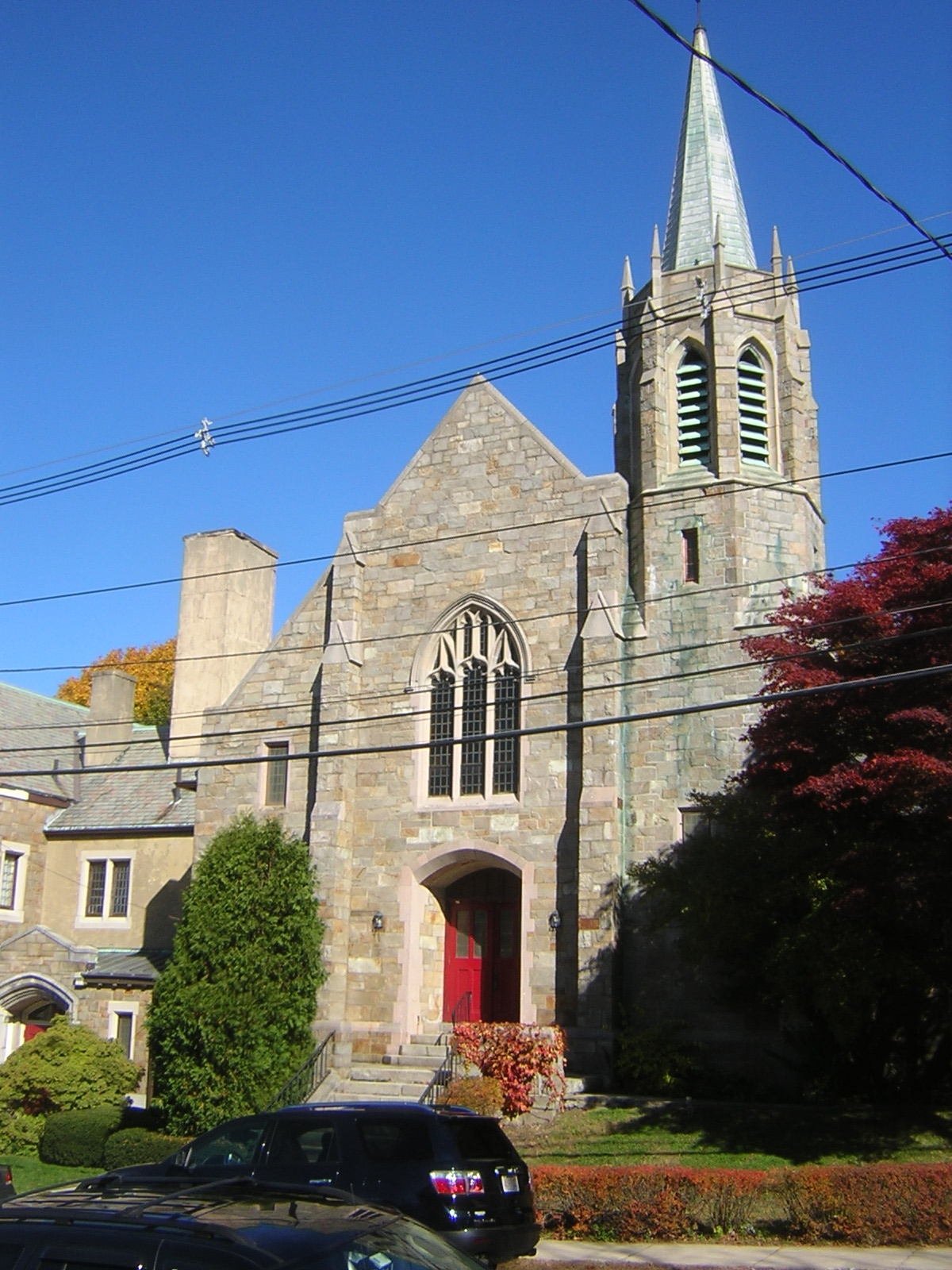

Wollaston Congregational Church is a historic Congregational church building at 45-57 Lincoln Avenue in Wollaston, Massachusetts. The granite Gothic Revival structure was designed by Smith & Walker, and built in 1926, on the site of an earlier (1875) wooden Gothic Revival church. Its parish house, also Gothic in style and designed by the same team, was built in 1915. The congregation was established as a consequence of the Wollaston area's rapid growth beginning in the 1870s.

The building was listed on the National Register of Historic Places in 2008.

== See also ==
- National Register of Historic Places listings in Quincy, Massachusetts
