= United Congregational Church of Irondequoit =

Historic church in New York, United States

- U.S. National Register of Historic Places
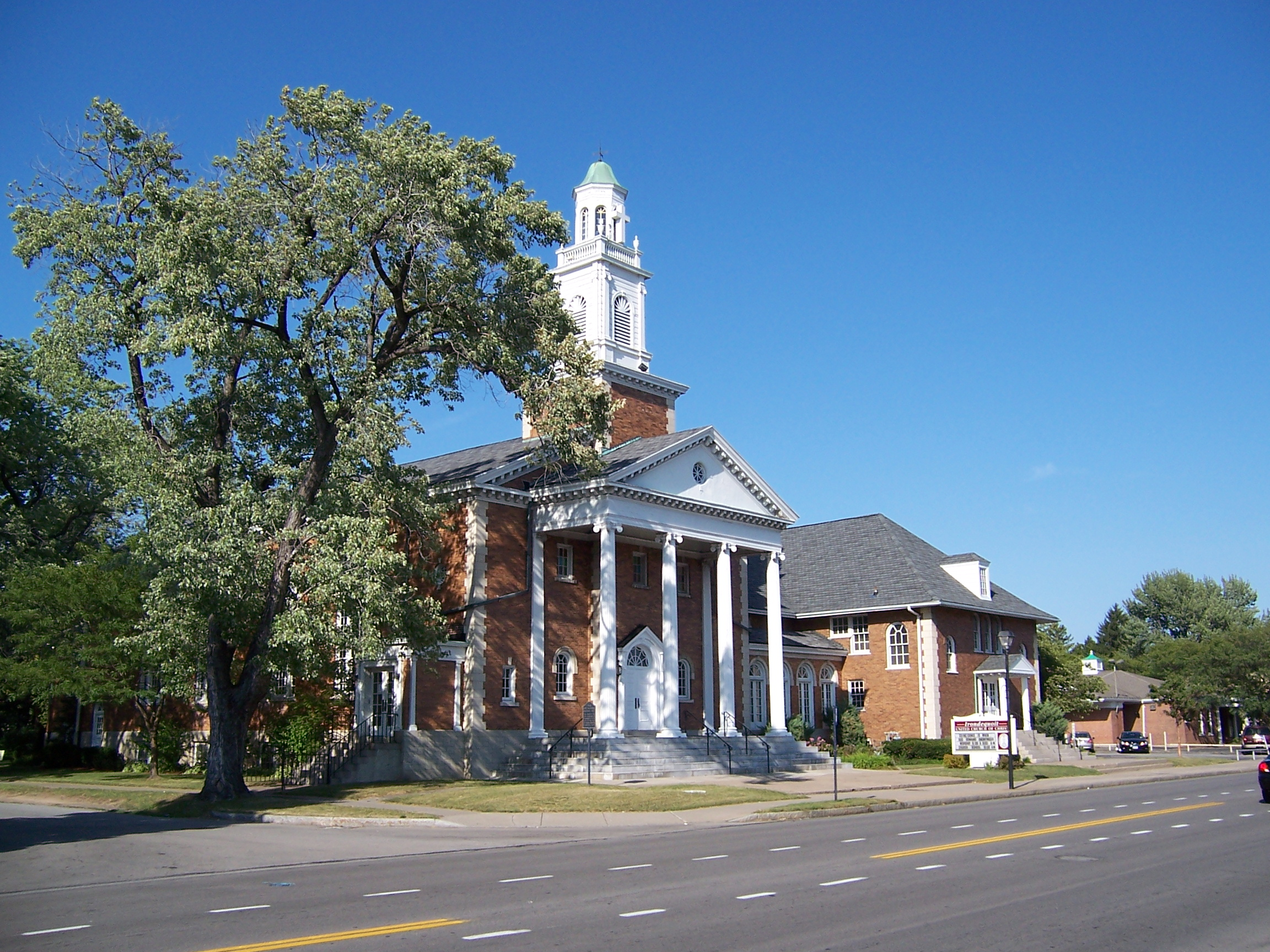
- United Congregational Church of Irondequoit

- Location within New York Location within the United States
- Location: 644 Titus Ave., Rochester, New York
- Coordinates: 43°12′39″N 77°35′59″W
- Area: 1.7 acres (0.69 ha)
- Built: 1910
- Architect: Foote, Orlando K.; Carpenter, Charles
- Architectural style: Colonial Revival, Bungalow/Craftsman
- NRHP reference No.: 02000822
- Added to NRHP: August 2, 2002

United Congregational Church of Irondequoit, also known as Irondequoit United Church of Christ, is a historic Congregational church complex in Rochester in Monroe County, New York. The complex consists of three connected buildings: a Colonial Revival-style church (1926), a Woman's Christian Temperance Union hall (1910), and a church school.

It was listed on the National Register of Historic Places in 2002.
