= First Congregational Church =

First Congregational Church, or variations such as First Congregational Church, Former may refer to:

== Alabama ==
- First Congregational Church of Marion

== Arizona ==
- First Congregational Church and Parsonage (Prescott, Arizona)

== California ==
- First Congregational Church (Long Beach, California)
- First Congregational Church of Los Angeles
- First Congregational Church of Pescadero
- First Congregational Church (Porterville, California)
- First Congregational Church of Riverside
- First Congregational Church (Riverside, California)
- First Congregational Church of Sierra Madre

== Colorado ==
- First Congregational Church (Colorado Springs, Colorado)
- First Congregational Church (Denver, Colorado)
- First Congregational Church of Lyons
- First Congregational Church (Manitou Springs, Colorado)
- First Congregational Church (Pueblo, Colorado)

== Connecticut ==
- First Congregational Church of Cheshire
- First Congregational Church of East Hartford and Parsonage
- First Congregational Church of East Haven
- First Congregational Church of Plainfield

== Georgia ==
- First Congregational Church (Atlanta)

== Illinois ==
- First Congregational Church of Austin
- First Congregational Church (Des Plaines, Illinois)
- First Congregational Church of LaMoille
- First Congregational Church (Marshall, Illinois)
- First Congregational Church of Sterling
- First Congregational Church of Western Springs

== Indiana ==
- First Congregational Church of Michigan City
- First Congregational Church (Terre Haute, Indiana)

== Iowa ==
- First Congregational Church (Burlington, Iowa)
- First Congregational Church (Davenport, Iowa)
- First Congregational Church (Eldora, Iowa)
- First Congregational Church (Garnavillo, Iowa)
- First Congregational Church, Former (Sioux City, Iowa)

== Kansas ==
- First Congregational Church (Anthony, Kansas)
- First Congregational Church (Fort Scott, Kansas)
- First Congregational Church (Independence, Kansas), listed on the NRHP in Montgomery County
- First Congregational Church (Manhattan, Kansas)

== Maine ==
- First Congregational Church of Buxton
- First Congregational Church, United Church of Christ, Farmington
- First Congregational Church and Parsonage (Kittery, Maine)
- First Congregational Church (Pittston, Maine)
- First Congregational Church, Former (Wells, Maine)

== Massachusetts ==
- First Congregational Church of Blandford
- First Congregational Church of East Longmeadow
- First Congregational Church of Hyde Park
- First Congregational Church (Spencer, Massachusetts)
- First Congregational Church (Stoneham, Massachusetts)
- First Congregational Parish Historic District, Truro
- First Congregational Church (Waltham, Massachusetts)
- First Congregational Church in Woburn

== Michigan ==
- First Congregational Church (Charlotte, Michigan)
- First Congregational Church (Chelsea, Michigan), listed as a Michigan State Historic Site (MSHS)
- First Congregational Church (Covert, Michigan), listed as a MSHS
- First Congregational Church (Detroit)
- First Congregational Church (Jackson, Michigan), and as a MSHS
- First Congregational Church (Lake Linden, Michigan)
- First Congregational Church (Lawrence, Michigan), listed as a MSHS
- First Congregational Church (Manistee, Michigan)
- Portland First Congregational Church
- First Congregational Church (Richmond, Michigan)
- First Congregational Church (Union City, Michigan), listed as a MSHS
- First Congregational Church (Vermontville, Michigan)

== Minnesota ==
- First Congregational Church of Clearwater
- First Congregational Church (Minneapolis, Minnesota)
- First Congregational Church of Zumbrota

== Montana ==
- Billings First Congregational Church

== Nebraska ==
- First Congregational Church, U.C.C. (Naponee, Nebraska)

== New Hampshire ==
- First Congregational Church (Alton, New Hampshire)
- First Congregational Church of Boscawen
- First Congregational Church (Farmington, New Hampshire)

== New Jersey ==
- First Congregational Church (Chester, New Jersey)

== New York ==
- First Congregational Church of Albany
- First Congregational Church of Bay Shore
- First Congregational Church (Berkshire, New York)
- First Congregational Church and Cemetery
- First Congregational Church of Madrid
- First Congregational Church (Malone, New York)
- First Congregational Church of Middletown
- First Congregational Church (Moravia, New York), in Church Street-Congress Street Historic District
- First Congregational Church of New Village
- First Congregational Church of Otto
- First Congregational Church and Society of Volney

== North Carolina ==
- First Congregational Church (Mount Pleasant, North Carolina)

== Ohio ==
- First Congregational Church (Akron, Ohio)
- First Congregational Church (Columbus, Ohio), listed on the Columbus Register of Historic Properties
- First Congregational Church of Cuyahoga Falls
- First Congregational Church and Lexington School
- First Congregational Church (Marblehead, Ohio)
- First Congregational Church (Sandusky, Ohio)

== Oklahoma ==
- First Congregational Church (Waynoka, Oklahoma)

== Oregon ==
- First Congregational Church (Corvallis, Oregon)
- First Congregational Church (Eugene, Oregon)
- First Congregational Church of Oregon City
- First Congregational Church (Portland, Oregon)

== South Dakota ==
- First Congregational Church of Milbank
- First Congregational Church (Rapid City, South Dakota)
- First Congregational Church (Sioux Falls, South Dakota)
- First Congregational Church (Turton, South Dakota)

== Tennessee ==
- First Congregational Church (Chattanooga, Tennessee), listed on the NRHP in Hamilton County
- First Congregational Church and Parish House

== Utah ==
- First Congregational Church (Salt Lake City, Utah)

== Vermont ==
- First Congregational Church of Bennington
- First Congregational Church (Orwell, Vermont)
- First Congregational Church of Swanton
- First Congregational Church and Meetinghouse, Townshend

== Washington ==
- First Congregational Church of Spokane

== Wisconsin ==
- First Congregational Church (Beloit, Wisconsin)
- Community House, First Congregational Church
- First Congregational Church (Hartland, Wisconsin)
- First Congregational Church (Platteville, Wisconsin)
- First Congregational Church (Ripon, Wisconsin)
- First Congregational Church (Waukesha, Wisconsin)

== See also ==
- List of Congregational churches
- Congregational church (disambiguation)
