= First Congregational United Church of Christ =

First Congregational United Church of Christ may refer to:

- First Congregational Church, U.C.C. (Naponee, Nebraska), listed on the NRHP
- First Congregational Church, United Church of Christ, listed on the NRHP
- First Congregational United Church of Christ (Belle Fourche, South Dakota), listed on the NRHP
- First Congregational United Church of Christ (Billings, Montana)

== See also ==
- List of Congregational churches
- First Congregational Church (disambiguation)
