= Congregationalism (disambiguation) =

Congregationalism refers to Congregationalist polity, a form of church governance based on the local congregation.

It may also refer to:

- Congregational churches, a family of denominations within the Reformed tradition known for a congregationalist form of governance
  - Congregationalism in the United States, the Congregationalist tradition in the United States

== See also ==
- Congregational Church (disambiguation)
