= First Congregational Church (Porterville, California) =

Historic church in California, United States

- U.S. National Register of Historic Places
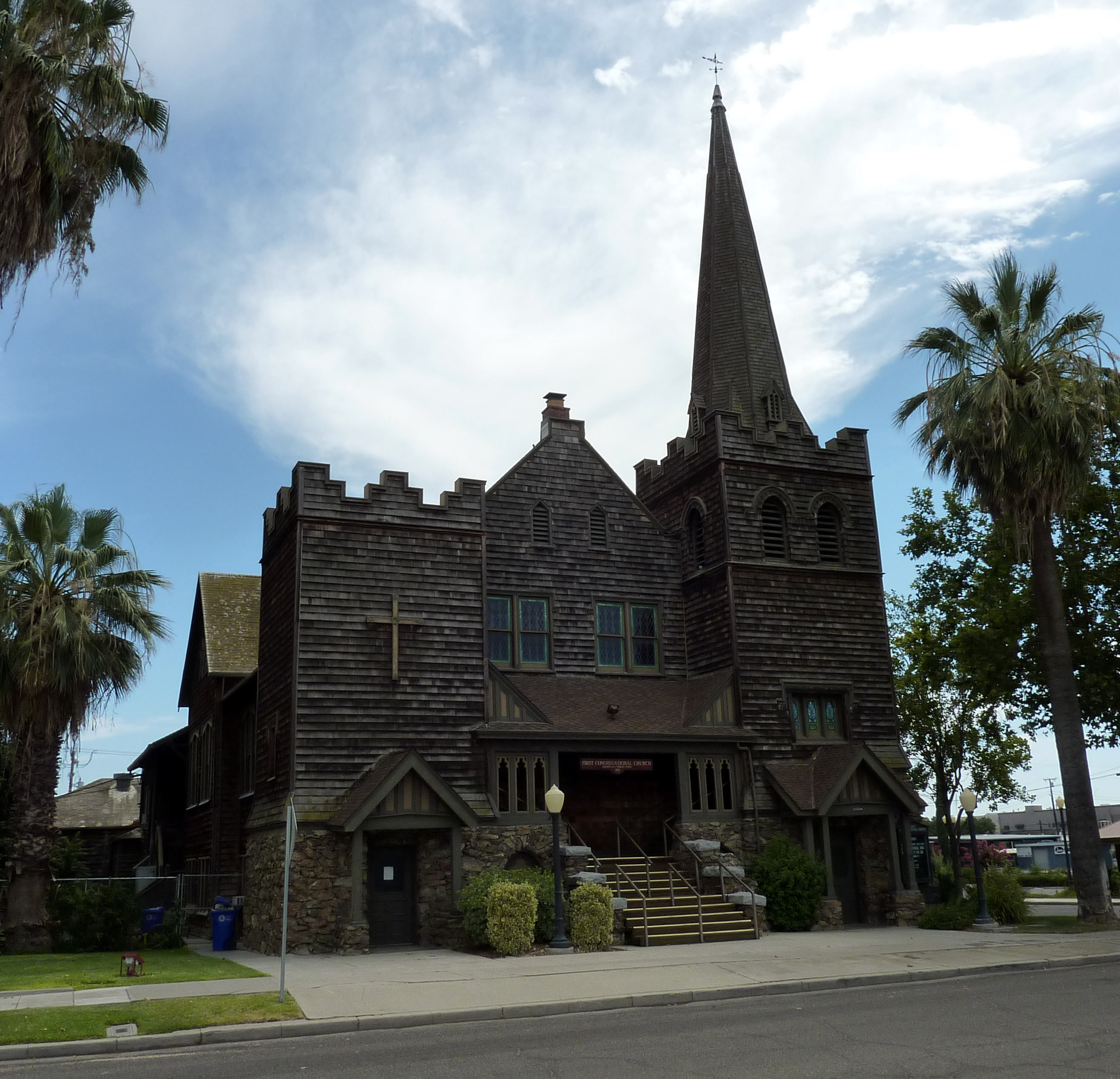

- Location within California Location within the United States
- Location: 165 E. Mill St., Porterville, California
- Coordinates: 36°4′7″N 119°0′43″W
- Area: 0.4 acres (0.16 ha)
- Built: 1908
- Architect: Meeker, George C.; Reed, Francis W.
- Architectural style: Gothic Revival, First Bay Tradition
- NRHP reference No.: 98001553
- Added to NRHP: January 5, 1999

First Congregational Church is a historic church building at 165 East Mill Street in Porterville, California. The church was built in 1908 by Porterville's Congregationalists. San Francisco architects Francis W. Reed and George C. Meeker designed the church; their design applies the principles of the First Bay Tradition to a Gothic Revival plan. The design includes a shingled wooden exterior, typical of the First Bay Tradition, and a Gothic spire and arches; the church is the only building in the southern San Joaquin Valley to incorporate both styles. The new church building served as an "institutional church" which also provided community services, including an auditorium, a gymnasium and swimming pool, and a private kindergarten.

The church was added to the National Register of Historic Places in 1999. The congregation is affiliated with the National Association of Congregational Christian Churches.
