= First Congregational Church (Denver) =

Historic church in Colorado, United States

- U.S. National Register of Historic Places
- Colorado State Register of Historic Properties
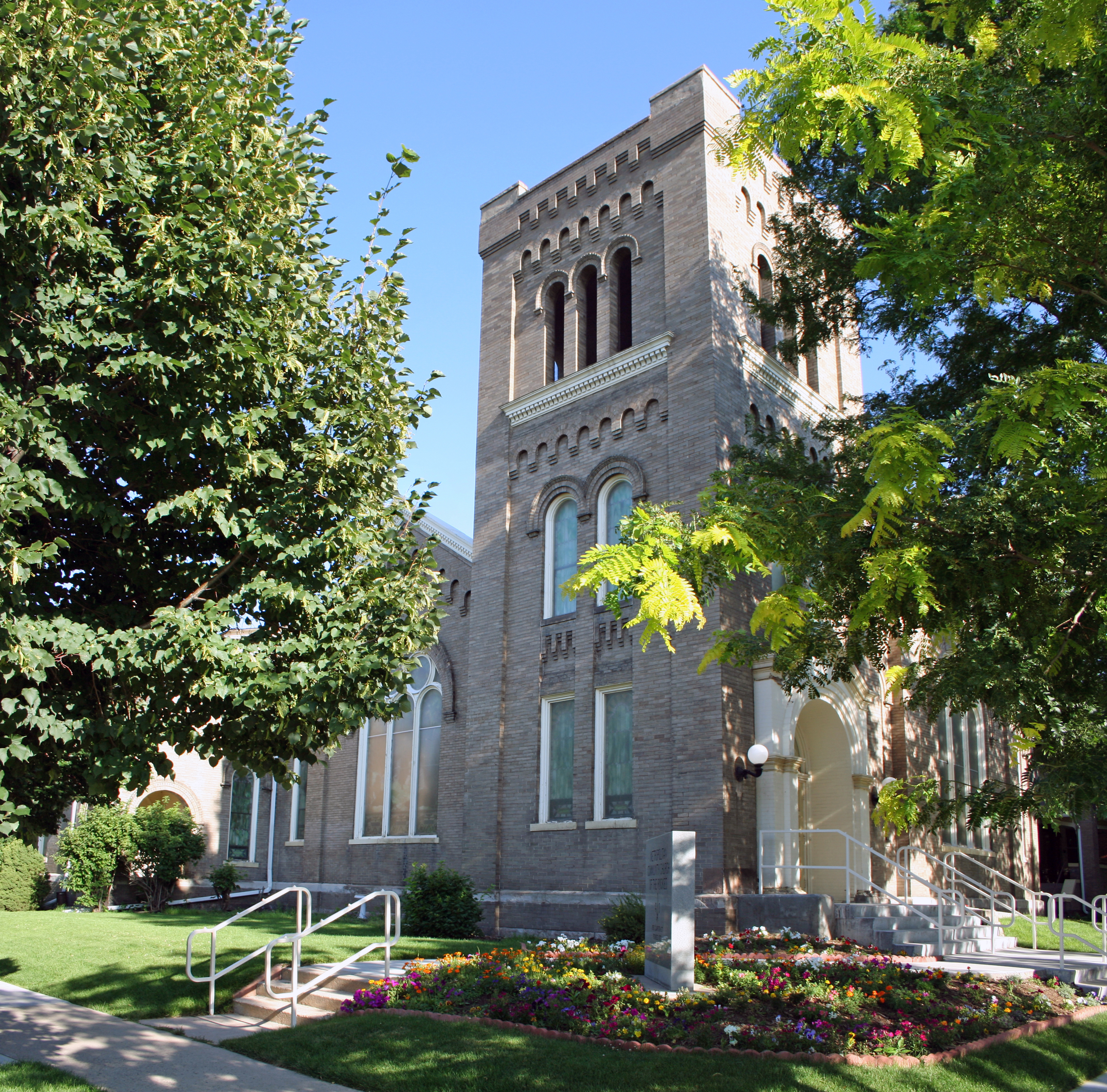

- Location within Colorado Location within the United States
- Location: 980 Clarkson St., Denver, Colorado
- Coordinates: 39°43′54″N 104°58′36″W
- Area: less than one acre
- Built: 1907, 1910
- Architect: Robert S. Roeschlaub & Son
- Architectural style: Late 19th and 20th Century Revivals, Lombardic Revival
- NRHP reference No.: 87002011
- CSRHP No.: 5DV.2681
- Added to NRHP: November 16, 1987

First Congregational Church (also known as Metropolitan Community Church of the Rockies) is a historic church in Denver, Colorado. Its church building was added to the National Register in 1987.

The First Congregational Church of Denver was organized in 1864. After several moves and expansion, the church determined in 1905 that it needed to construct a new building, and purchased four lots at 10th Avenue and Clarkson Street for $5,000. The sanctuary was built in 1907 and a fellowship hall wing was completed in 1910.

The sanctuary is essentially cubical and has a three-story corner bell tower. With the added social hall wing, the church is 64 by 108 feet (20 m × 33 m) in plan. It was designed by Robert S. Roeschlaub Roeschlaub & Son in what its National Registration nomination terms "Lombardic Revival" style, i.e. its design was inspired by 7th and 8th century Italian Lombard style.

The property also includes a 1912 parsonage built in foursquare style.
