= First Congregational Church and Society of Volney =

Historic church in New York, United States

- U.S. National Register of Historic Places
- Location within New York Location within the United States
- Location: NY 3, Volney, New York
- Coordinates: 43°20′18″N 76°20′19″W
- Area: less than one acre
- Built: 1832
- Architectural style: Federal
- MPS: Freedom Trail, Abolitionism, and African American Life in Central New York MPS
- NRHP reference No.: 01000675
- Added to NRHP: June 29, 2001

First Congregational Church and Society of Volney, also known as Bristol Hill Church, Congregational United Church of Christ, is a historic Congregational church located at Volney in Oswego County, New York. It is a frame vernacular Federal style structure built in 1832–1835. It is a two-story structure, rectangular in plan, 40 feet wide and 54 feet deep. A tower extends from the center of its facade. Except for the loss of its bell, the church is in virtually original condition. Early members of the church were abolitionists and the church is known to have had African American members dating to the 1820s.

It was listed on the National Register of Historic Places in 2001.
