= First Congregational Church (Des Plaines, Illinois) =

Historic church in Illinois, United States

- First Congregational Church, Des Plaines
- U.S. National Register of Historic Places
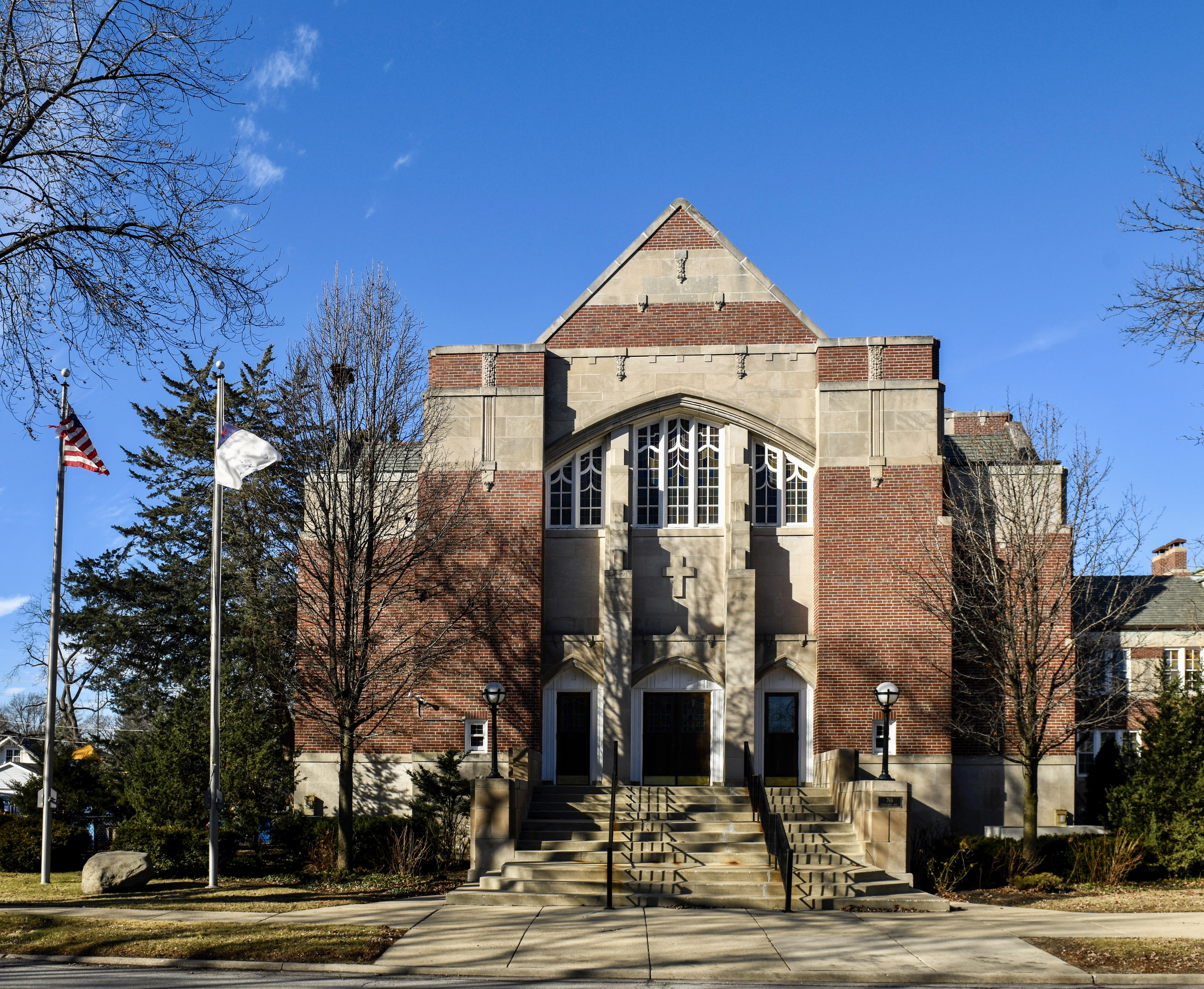

- Location within Chicago metropolitan area Location within Illinois Location within the United States
- Location: 766 Graceland Ave., Des Plaines, Illinois
- Coordinates: 42°02′21″N 87°53′30″W
- Built: 1929
- Architect: Pond & Pond, Martin and Lloyd
- Architectural style: Arts and Crafts
- Website: https://www.fccdp.org/
- NRHP reference No.: 100004310
- Added to NRHP: August 27, 2019

First Congregational Church is a historic Congregational church at 766 Graceland Avenue in Des Plaines, Illinois. The church's congregation formed in 1869 and built its first church in the early 1870s. As Des Plaines expanded in the 1920s, the congregation outgrew its original church, and it had the current church building constructed in 1929. The firm of Pond & Pond, Martin and Lloyd gave the church an Arts and Crafts design; it is one of the few buildings in Des Plaines designed by a major architecture firm. The church's design includes a brick and limestone exterior with an emphasis on geometric patterns, a gable front entrance flanked by square towers, and an arched window divided by buttresses above the entrance. Its sanctuary houses a stained glass window designed by Edgar Miller which depicts events in the life of Christ.

The church was added to the National Register of Historic Places on August 27, 2019.
