= First Congregational United Church of Christ (Belle Fourche, South Dakota) =

Historic church in South Dakota, United States

- U.S. National Register of Historic Places
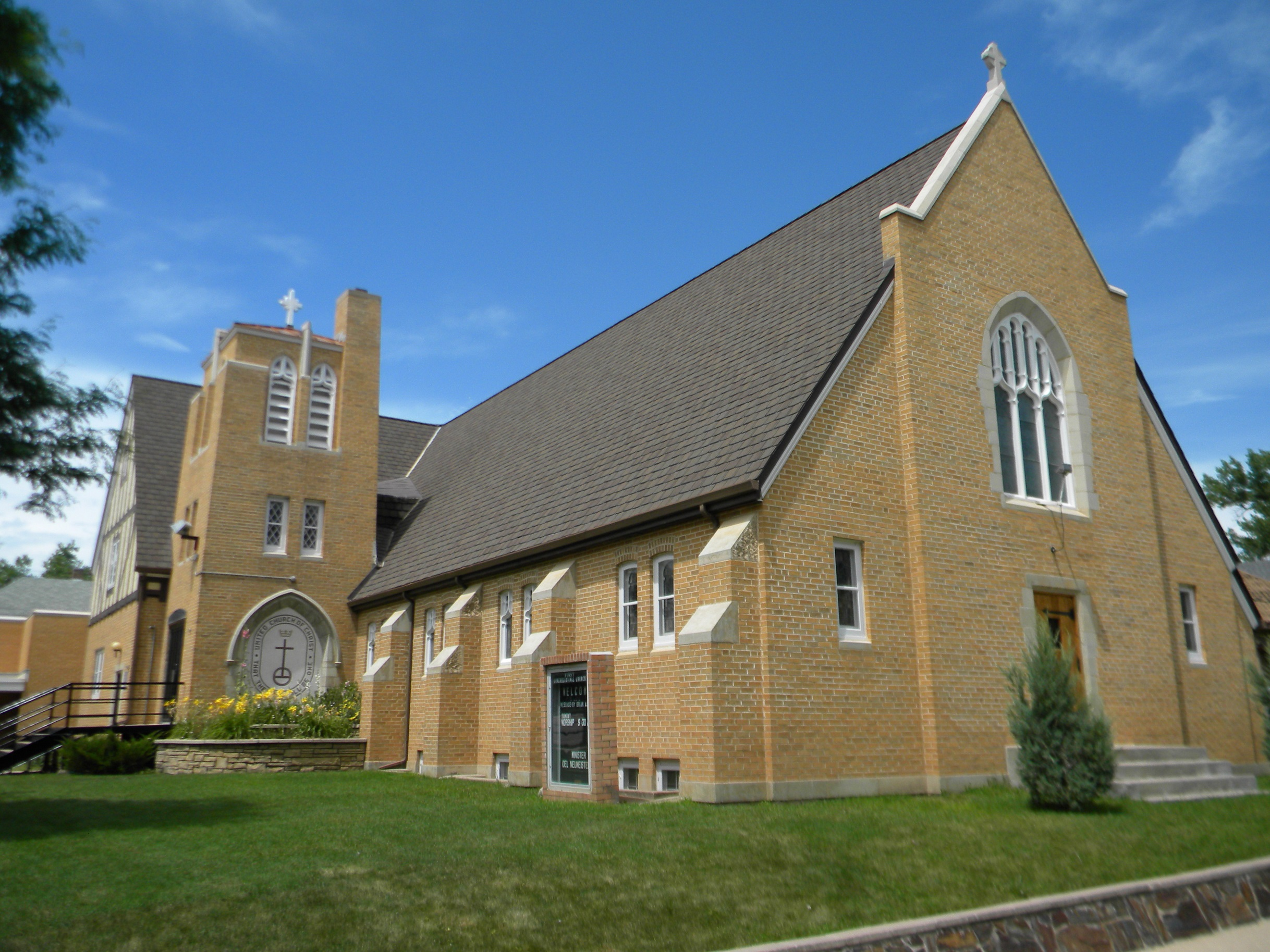

- Location within South Dakota Location within the United States
- Location: 717 Jackson St., Belle Fourche, South Dakota
- Coordinates: 44°40′02″N 103°50′59″W
- Area: less than one acre
- Built: 1949, 1965
- Architect: Joseph Vanderbilt and Carl Bard
- Architectural style: Tudor Revival
- NRHP reference No.: 13000571
- Added to NRHP: July 30, 2013

The First Congregational United Church of Christ in Belle Fourche, South Dakota was listed on the National Register of Historic Places in 2013.

Its building, completed in 1949, is Tudor Revival in style. It is T-shaped. It was designed by architects Joseph Vanderbilt and Carl Bard. A rectangular addition to the rear was added in 1965.

The church was deemed "significant locally as the most prominent Tudor Revival styled building in town" and as the "most styled" of the historic brick churches, out of seven churches, in Belle Fourche.

Congregationalist church services were first held in Belle Fourche in 1891. The church's first building, a small frame church, was built in 1892.

It is one of two church buildings of the congregation, in 2018; the other is at 423 Elm Street in St. Onge.
