= First Congregational Church (Marshall, Illinois) =

Historic church in Illinois, United States

- U.S. National Register of Historic Places
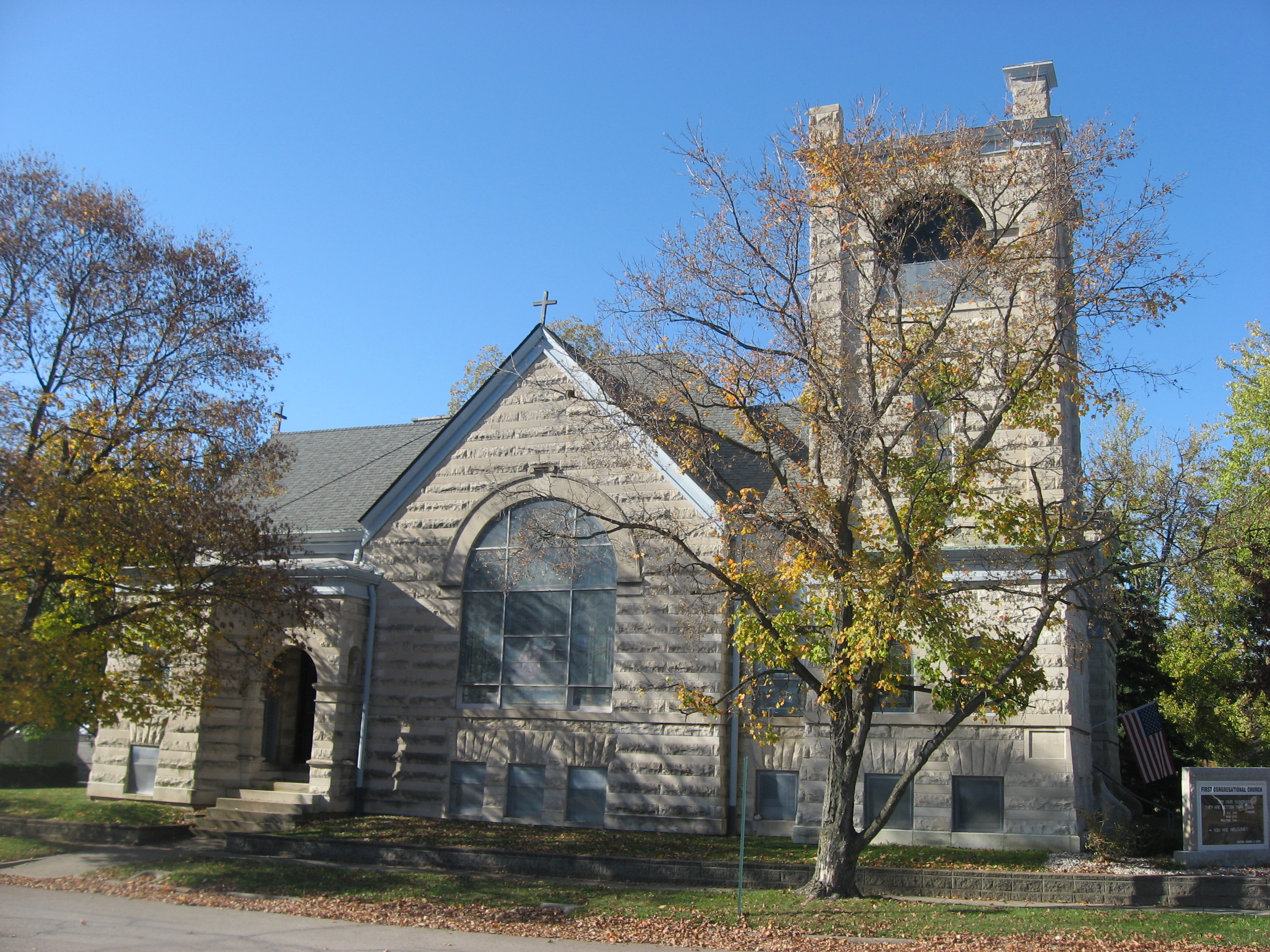

- Location within Illinois Location within the United States
- Location: 202 N 6th St., Marshall, Illinois
- Coordinates: 39°23′37″N 87°41′48″W
- Area: less than one acre
- Built: 1909
- Built by: Gray Construction Company
- Architectural style: Romanesque
- NRHP reference No.: 02001753
- Added to NRHP: February 5, 2003

First Congregational Church is a historic Congregational church located at 202 N 6th Street in Marshall, Illinois. Built in 1909, the church was the third built for Marshall's First Congregation, which was established in 1841. The Gray Construction Company built the church in the Richardsonian Romanesque style. The church has limestone walls laid in alternating smooth and rusticated rows. The asymmetrical entrance features two arches supported by columns with ornamental floral capitals. The church has multiple stained glass windows, including a rose window on its front facade. A 56-foot (17 m) bell tower with square pillars at the upper corners marks the southeast corner of the building. The tower's bell, a relic from the original two churches, was made in 1850 by the Buckeye Bell Foundry of Cincinnati, Ohio.

The church was added to the National Register of Historic Places on February 5, 2003.
