= First Congregational Church (Sioux Falls, South Dakota) =

Historic church in South Dakota, United States

- U.S. National Register of Historic Places
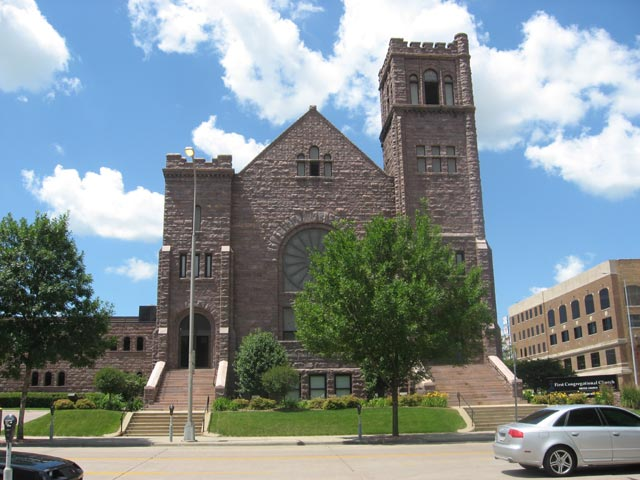

- Location within South Dakota Location within the United States
- Location: 303 S. Dakota Ave., Sioux Falls, South Dakota
- Coordinates: 43°32′40″N 96°43′48″W
- Area: 1 acre (0.40 ha)
- Built: 1907
- Architect: Joseph Schwarz
- Architectural style: Richardsonian Romanesque
- NRHP reference No.: 83003012
- Added to NRHP: August 18, 1983

First Congregational Church is a historic church in Sioux Falls, South Dakota. It was built in 1907 and was added to the National Register in 1983.

It is a 2 1/2-story church with unequal towers at its front corners and a "tower-like structure" on its north facade which holds the rear entrance.

A two-story educational wing was added 1955. This structure, designed by Lucas, Craig & Whitwam, originally had a curtain wall of glass and dark panels with aluminum framing on the west facade (i.e. front facade). At some point after the 1983 nomination to the register, this facade was replaced with an attempt to copy the Richardsonian Romanesque exterior of the 1907 church.
