= First Congregational Church (Eugene, Oregon) =

Historic church in Oregon, United States

- Bijou Theatre
- U.S. National Register of Historic Places
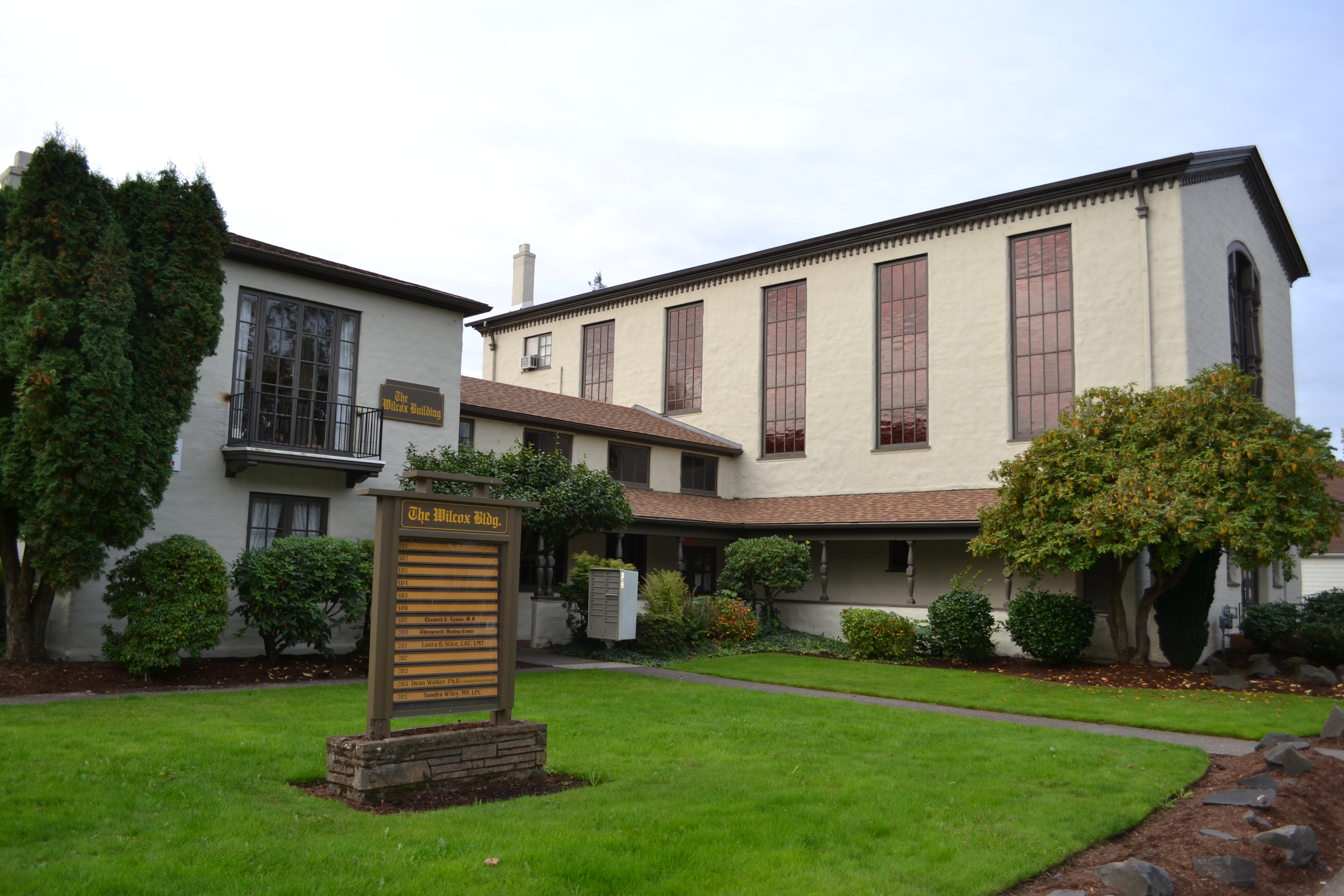
- The Willcox Building (former First Congregational Church) in 2011

- Location within Oregon Location within the United States
- Location: 492 E. 13th Ave., Eugene, Oregon
- Coordinates: 44°2′42.9″N 123°5′7.7″W
- Built: 1925
- Architect: Willcox, Walter R. B.
- Architectural style: Late 19th and 20th Century Revivals, Mediterranean Revival
- NRHP reference No.: 80003333
- Added to NRHP: February 12, 1980

The First Congregational Church building, of Eugene, Oregon, is a former church building listed on the U.S. National Register of Historic Places. It was built in 1925. Also known as the Old Congregational Church and more recently as the Willcox Building, it includes Late 19th and 20th Century Revivals and Mediterranean Revival architecture.

It was added to the National Register of Historic Places in 1980. Having ceased to be used as a church, the building was sold in 1956. It then served as a memorial chapel from 1956 to 1979. After being sold again in 1979, to Associated Management, Inc., it was put to use for other activities. It was renamed the Willcox Building, after the architect who designed it, Walter R. B. Willcox (1869–1947).

From 1980, the building was occupied by a theater known as the Bijou Art Cinema. The Bijou permanently closed in 2021.

According to its NRHP nomination, it "is significant for its architectural excellence. It is the best of the remaining local structures designed by Walter R. B. Willcox, a Northwest architect and educator of considerable renown, and considered to be his only ecclesiastic building in Oregon."
