= First Congregational Church of Milbank =

Historic church in South Dakota, United States

- U.S. National Register of Historic Places
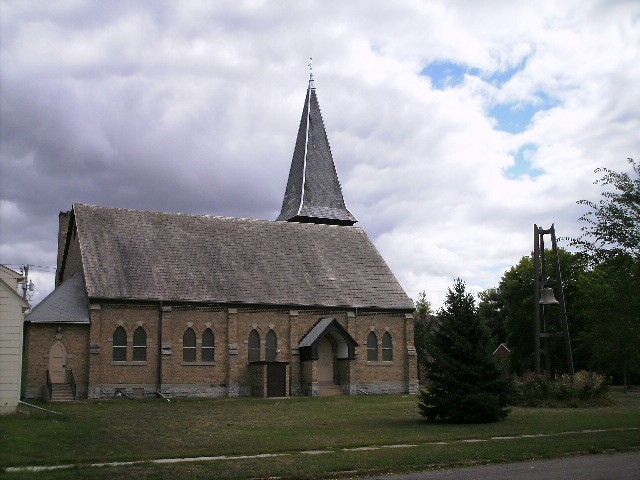

- Location within South Dakota Location within the United States
- Location: E. 3rd Ave., Milbank, South Dakota
- Coordinates: 45°13′31″N 96°37′39″W
- Area: 1 acre (0.40 ha)
- Built: 1883
- Built by: James P. Niblo
- Architectural style: High Victorian Gothic
- NRHP reference No.: 78002553
- Added to NRHP: April 19, 1978

The First Congregational Church of Milbank is a historic church in Milbank, South Dakota. It has also been known as Congregational Church of Christ. It was built in 1883 and was added to the National Register of Historic Places in 1978.

It is operated by the Grant County Historical Society.

It is currently affiliated with the United Church of Christ (UCC).
