= First Congregational Church of Zumbrota =

Historic church in Minnesota, United States

- U.S. National Register of Historic Places
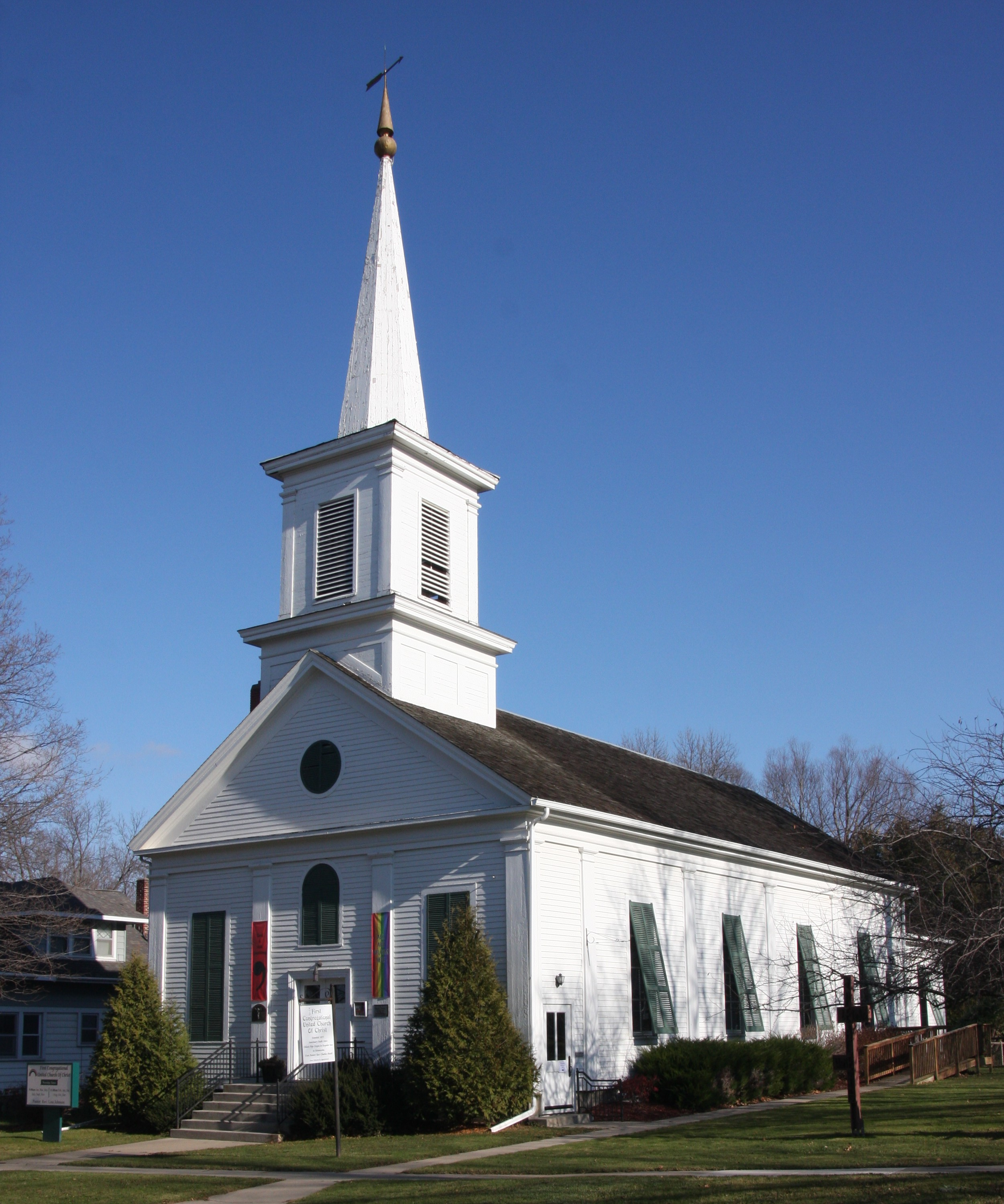
- First Congregational Church of Zumbrota in 2016

- Location within Minnesota Location within the United States
- Location: 455 East Avenue; Zumbrota, Minnesota
- Coordinates: 44°17′31″N 92°40′2″W
- Area: less than one acre
- Built: 1862
- Architectural style: Greek Revival
- MPS: Rural Goodhue County MRA
- NRHP reference No.: 80002065
- Added to NRHP: February 12, 1980

The First Congregational Church of Zumbrota is an historic congregational church in Zumbrota, Minnesota, United States. It was built in 1862 in the form of a colonial meeting house. It is listed on the National Register of Historic Places for being one of Southeast Minnesota's oldest standing churches and a reflection of New Englander settlement in many of its towns.

On June 28, 1857, fifty people attended a meeting in the Webster and Thompson Land Office to formally organize the church. The fourteen charter members of the church were: Josiah and Nancy W. Thompson, Charles and Harriet E. Ward, and Thomas P. Kellett, all of Lowell, Massachusetts; Charles C. and Elizabeth D. Webster of Canaan, New Hampshire; George and Abby R. Sanderson of Red Wing, Minnesota; Albert and Lucy Ann Barrett of Staffordville, Connecticut; D. Berkley and Susan H. Goddard of Worcester, Massachusetts; and Nathaniel Mullihan of Brookline, Massachusetts.

A hall on the second floor of T.P. Kellett's store (on the corner where the downtown Bank of Zumbrota now stands) was used for a church service for the first time on Thanksgiving Day of 1857. By 1860, the members began to seriously consider building a church, but because of the poor harvests in 1857-59, people had very little cash, and so one of the members was authorized to go back to Massachusetts to ask for donations. He collected $1,000, which made it possible to begin construction in the fall of 1861.

The lumber was purchased in Red Wing and hauled to the site by teams of oxen, because railroads had not yet come to Zumbrota. Each trip took two days. The lime was hauled from Lake City. One member had a stone quarry on his farm northwest of the town; this provided stone for the foundation. The stove pipe was donated by a Detroit hardware firm. John Willard of New York donated fifty hymnals. The first service in the new sanctuary was held in 1862. A bell, donated by the Ladies’ Society at a cost of $640, was hung in the belfry in 1868. The bell weighs 1,202 pounds and is still in use. Formerly it served as a school bell and a fire bell, as well as the church bell.

The back section of the church was added in 1880 as a social room and Sunday school area. A furnace was also added, along with chandeliers which held kerosene lamps. Old photos show wallpaper in the sanctuary, probably part of this same redecoration. Later, however, the walls were returned to their original New England white.

The first musical instrument in the church was a melodeon. After that, a reed organ was used until 1885 when the current organ was purchased from the Winona Congregational Church for $700. The organ was built in 1867 by the Steere and Turner Company. For many years the organ was pumped by hand. A complete record of the boys who pumped is carried in the initials carved during dull moments. Payment for this task was $6/year for many years, but was later raised to twenty-five cents per Sunday. The organ is believed to be the oldest pipe organ in Minnesota in regular use.

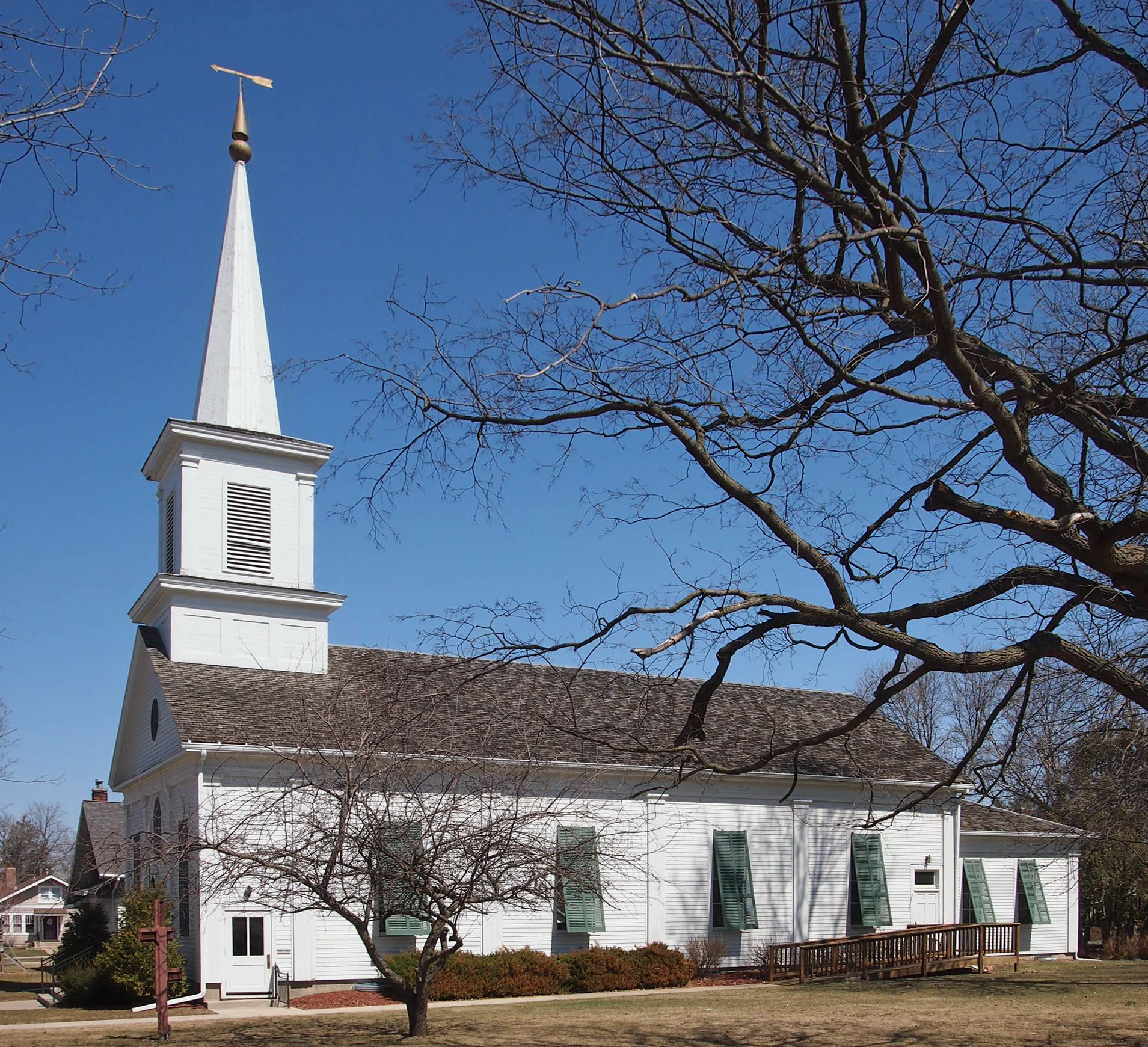
Side view of the church seen from the south-southwest

In 1916, the Congregational Church became federated with the Methodist Episcopal Church of Zumbrota. This federation was dissolved in 1920. In 1957, the Congregational Church became part of the United Church of Christ. In 1968, it was yoked with the Presbyterian Church of Oronoco. The yoke was subsequently dissolved in 2017.

The First Congregational United Church of Christ was placed on the National Register of Historic Places in 1982 through the efforts of Alvin Schlasner, in memory of his wife, Laura Schlasner.

Today's members strive to blend the building's historic character with the church's mission “to listen to the still speaking voice of God, to welcome all, to love our neighbor, to serve those in need, to live in faith, to accept grace, and in all things to give God the glory.” The church affirms ecumenical activity that fosters peacemaking and enrichment for all. It proclaims its commitment to the ministry of Jesus Christ for and with all persons without regard to race, gender, age, ability, economic status, or sexual orientation. The congregation voted to become a United Church of Christ 'Open and Affirming' church in 2010.

The Peace Pole located near the church was created for the church's sesquicentennial in 2007. Each square of iron was carved by a member, then cast as part of the Zumbrota Area Arts Council's Iron Pour, which coincided with the anniversary celebration. The words, “Peace: Let It Begin With Me,” echo the words of the Peace Hymn frequently sung at Sunday worship. First Congregational United Church of Christ, Zumbrota, welcomes visitors. Tours can be arranged by calling the church office, 507-732-7015.
