= Congregational church (disambiguation) =

Congregational churches are Protestant churches in the Reformed tradition that practise congregationalist polity.

Congregational church may also refer to:

== Denominations ==
United States denominations, except where stated otherwise.

- United Church of Christ a merger of:
  - Evangelical and Reformed Church
  - Congregational Christian Churches
- National Association of Congregational Christian Churches
- National Council of the Congregational Churches of the United States, 1865–1931
- Conservative Congregational Christian Conference
- Congregational Christian Churches in Canada
- Congregational Federation, a Congregational denomination in Great Britain

== Individual churches ==
- List of Congregational churches

== Other ==
- Church (congregation)

== See also ==
- Congregationalist polity
- First Congregational Church (disambiguation)
