= First Congregational Church (Marblehead, Ohio) =

Historic church in Ohio, United States

- U.S. National Register of Historic Places
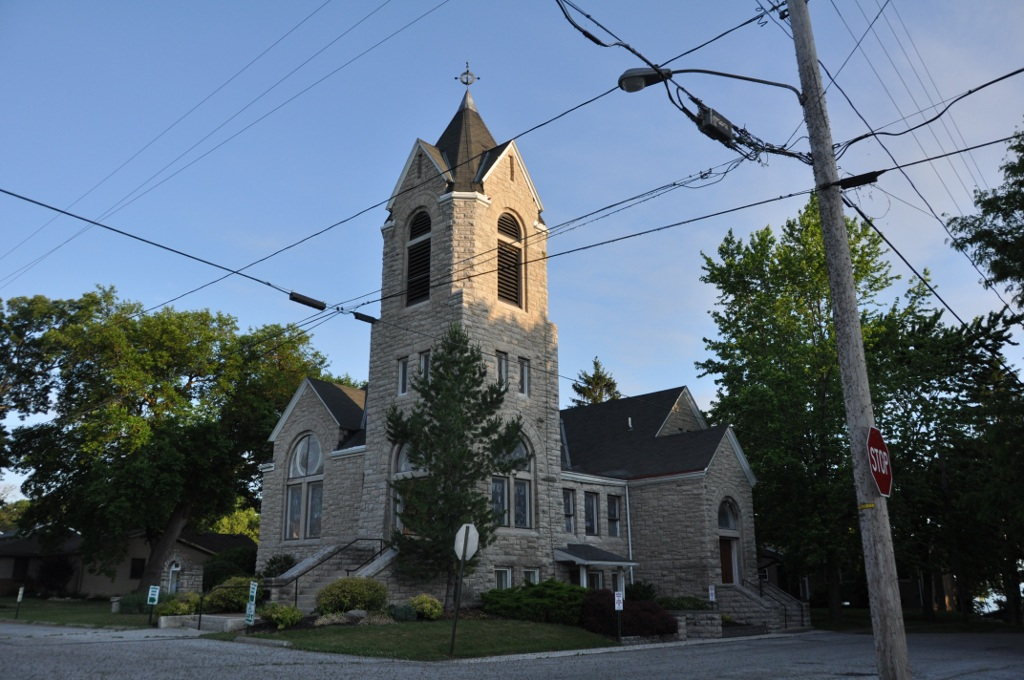

- Location within Ohio Location within the United States
- Location: 802 Prairie St., Marblehead, Ohio
- Coordinates: 41°32′32″N 82°44′5″W
- Area: less than one acre
- Built: 1900
- Architect: Marble, Oliver W.; Bertsch, Ed
- Architectural style: Romanesque
- NRHP reference No.: 00001161
- Added to NRHP: September 22, 2000

First Congregational Church (First United Church of Christ, Congregational) is a historic church at 802 Prairie Street in Marblehead, Ohio.

It was built in 1900 and added to the National Register of Historic Places in 2000.
