= First Congregational Church (Anthony, Kansas) =

- U.S. National Register of Historic Places
- The First Congregational Church in 2026

- Location within Kansas Location within the United States
- Location: 202 N. Bluff Ave., Anthony, Kansas
- Coordinates: 37°09′12″N 98°01′53″W
- Area: less than one acre
- Built: 1909–1910
- Architectural style: Gothic Revival
- NRHP reference No.: 14000349
- Added to NRHP: June 27, 2014

The First Congregational Church, located at 202 N. Bluff Ave. in Anthony, Kansas, was completed in 1910, replacing the 1880 first church of the congregation. It was listed on the National Register of Historic Places in 2014.

It includes Gothic Revival architecture. It has three crenelated towers.
