= First Congregational Church (Fort Scott, Kansas) =

Historic church in Kansas, United States

- U.S. National Register of Historic Places
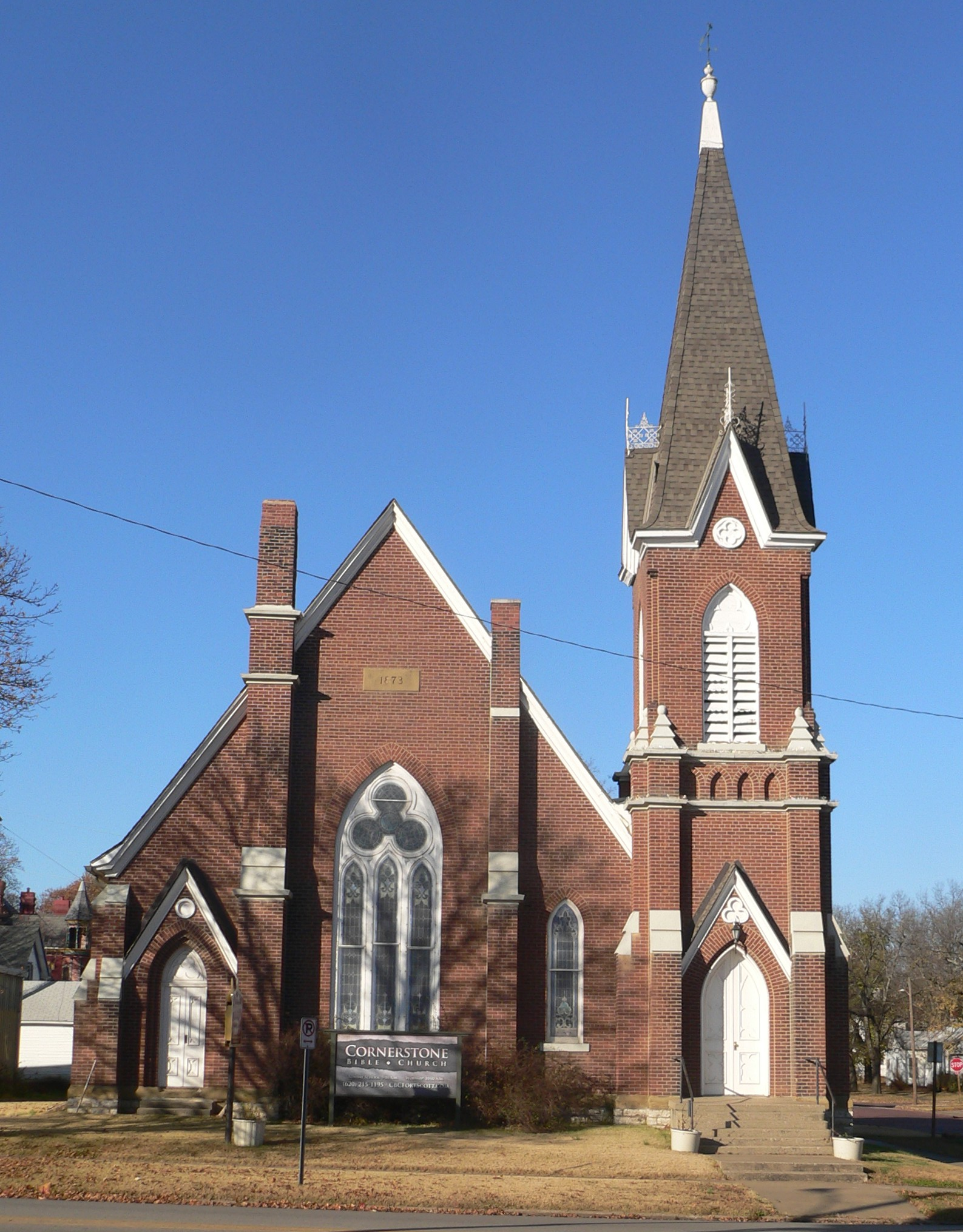

- Location within Kansas Location within the United States
- Location: 502 S. National Ave., Fort Scott, Kansas
- Coordinates: 37.836510°N 94.707623°W
- Built: 1872-73
- Built by: James Preston Chumlea; Warren Mikesell
- Architectural style: Gothic Revival
- NRHP reference No.: 05000200
- Added to NRHP: March 23, 2005

First Congregational Church (also known as Brethren Church or Old Congregational Church) is a church at 502 South National Avenue in Fort Scott, Kansas. The Gothic Revival church was built in 1872-73 and added to the National Register of Historic Places in 2005.

It was built in brick to replace the original First Congregational Church which was made of wood and which burned in 1872. The church "is an excellent example of the English Gothic style of architecture, with its pointed arch (lancet) windows, vaulted ceiling, steeply pitched roof and tall steeple."
