= First Bible Missionary Church =

- U.S. National Register of Historic Places
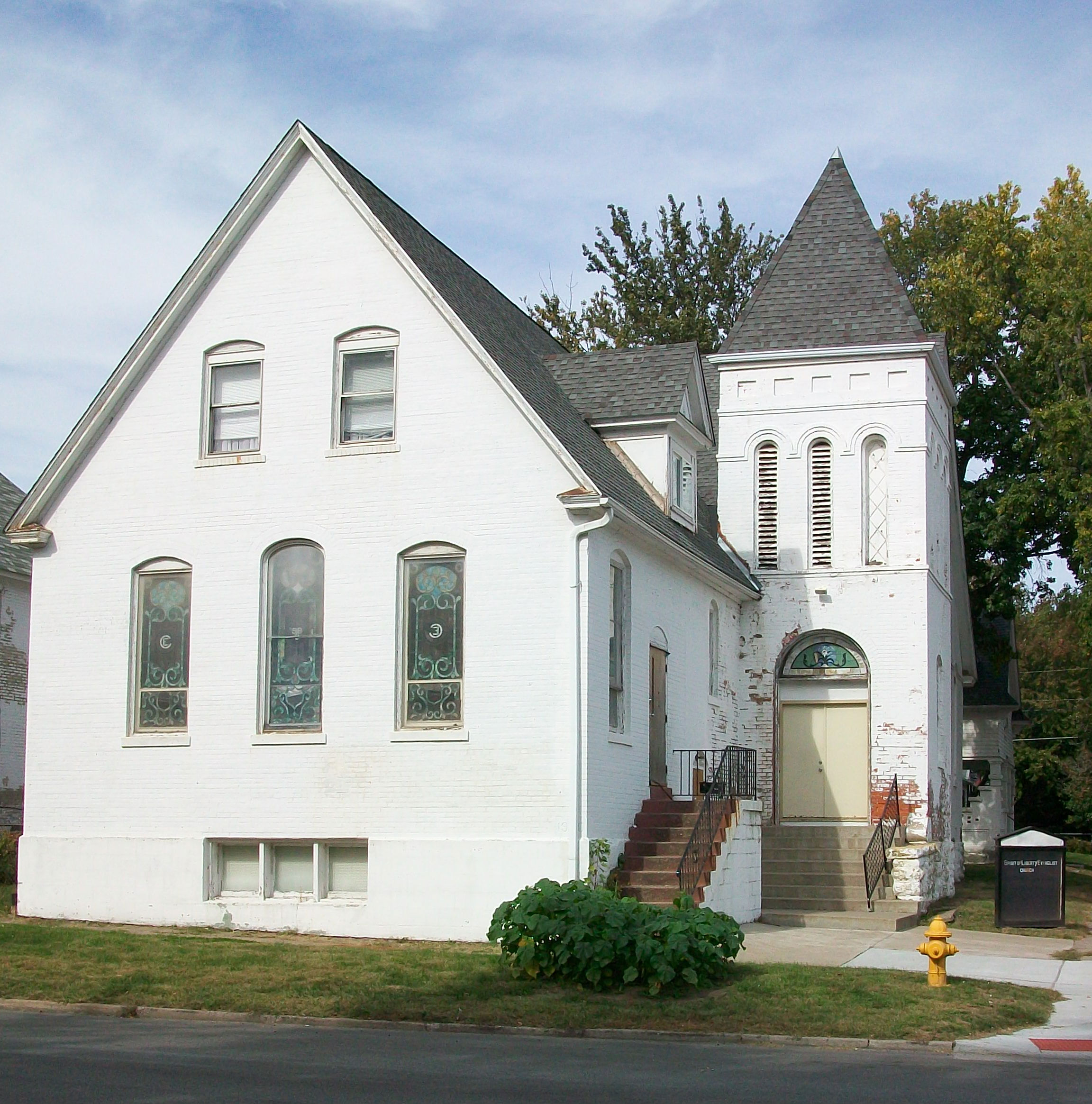
- The church in 2010

- Location within Iowa Location within the United States
- Location: 2202 W. 4th Street; Davenport, Iowa
- Coordinates: 41°31′25″N 90°36′41″W
- Area: less than one acre
- Built: 1902
- MPS: Davenport MRA
- NRHP reference No.: 83002429
- Added to NRHP: July 7, 1983

The former First Bible Missionary Church, located in the West End of Davenport, Iowa, United States, is an historic structure listed on the National Register of Historic Places. The building was built as a Congregational Church.

== History ==
The Congregational Church established a congregation in Davenport in 1839 as First Congregational Church and in 1861 it was reorganized as Edward's Congregational Church. The denomination was never large or broad-based in the city and was supported in part by the American Home Mission Society.

In 1857 the German Congregational Church was founded with a handful of members. They merged with Bethlehem Congregational Mission in 1909 and formed Berea Congregational Church. Berea was the congregation that built this structure. In 1964 Berea merged with Sunnymead Evangelical and Reformed Church and became Faith United Church of Christ. They occupied the Sunnymead facility in northwest Davenport. This building became First Bible Missionary Church, and it has changed congregations since. It has always housed small Protestant congregations.

== Architecture ==
The church building is constructed of brick on a rock-faced stone basement. The structure was designed in no clearly definable architectural style. It is a cross-gabled building with a tower in the angle on the east side. The exterior bricks are painted white, and the primary ornamentation of the building are narrow, molded stringcourses and its stained glass windows. It is defined more by its plain surface areas and clean, sharp lines. Also of note are the variety of window shapes employed on the building. Other features include short cornice returns, a pedimented roof dormer and palladian-like arrangement of the windows on the east side, all of which suggests Neoclassicism that was popular at the turn of the 20th century.
