= First Congregational Church (Turton, South Dakota) =

Historic church in South Dakota, United States

- U.S. National Register of Historic Places
- Location within South Dakota Location within the United States
- Location: Oak and 2nd Sts., Turton, South Dakota
- Coordinates: 45°3′1″N 98°5′46″W
- Area: less than one acre
- Built: 1893
- Built by: Ferdinand LaBrie
- Architectural style: Country Gothic
- NRHP reference No.: 79002407
- Added to NRHP: September 14, 1979

The First Congregational Church is a historic church in Turton, South Dakota. It was built in 1893 and was added to the National Register of Historic Places in 1979.

It was built by the men of the church, under supervision of carpenter Ferdinand LaBrie, a homesteader in the area. It provided church services from 1893 until 1963. The NRHP nomination states: "The importance of this church lies in its importance to the lives of the pioneers who built it and in its being a good representative of the 19th and early 20th century tradition of vernacular frame churches in South Dakota."
