= First Congregational Church of East Hartford and Parsonage =

Historic church in Connecticut, United States

- U.S. National Register of Historic Places
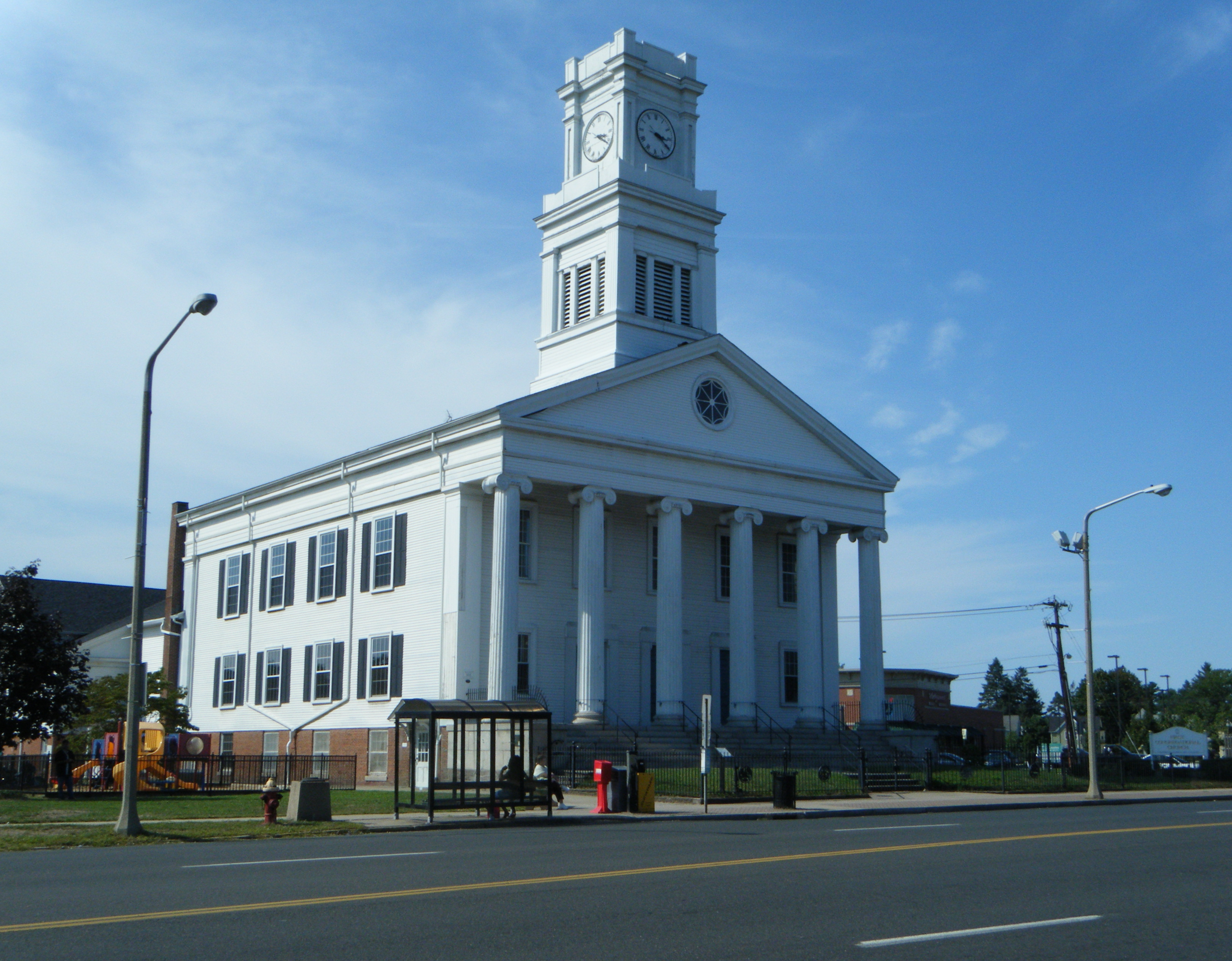

- Location within Connecticut Location within the United States
- Location: 829-837 Main Street, East Hartford, Connecticut
- Coordinates: 41°46′8″N 72°38′41″W
- Area: 1.5 acres (0.61 ha)
- Built: 1833
- Architect: Shepard, Chauncey
- Architectural style: Greek Revival
- NRHP reference No.: 82004398
- Added to NRHP: March 25, 1982

The First Congregational Church of East Hartford and Parsonage is a historic church at 829-837 Main Street in East Hartford, Connecticut. The congregation was founded around 1699 and the current church building was constructed around 1833. The building was added to the National Register of Historic Places in 1982. The congregation is currently affiliated with the United Church of Christ.

== History ==
First Congregational Church of East Hartford was founded somewhere between 1699 and 1701. The original members used to have to travel across the Connecticut River to Central Church in Hartford. The weekly quest began to take a toll on its traveling members, who decided to start their own church on the eastern side of the river. The building was completed in 1699, and the members began worshiping here, but had to gain religious approval by the King of England. The church received their anticipated approval in 1701, when the church officially gained its status as a recognized church. The church's first meeting house was actually built down the street from its current residence. There is now a large stone on the corner of Pitkin Street and Main Street marking the site of the first meeting house, which burned in the late 18th century. After the fire, the building was resurrected at its current site, on the corner of Main Street and Connecticut Boulevard. Then, in 1834, there was a second fire. Luckily, the building was not lost in this blaze. In 1835, the church was rebuilt, using charred timbers from its predecessor, which can still be seen in the church's attic). The organ in the sanctuary was originally built into the balcony to look out over the congregation on Sunday mornings. In 1952, the organ was moved down to the front of the sanctuary. The sanctuary itself was remodeled around the same time, turning its four aisles to just three.

The parsonage, next door to the church, was constructed in 1850, and served as the residence of the minister of the church, Rev. Woodward. The later-named Woodward house served in the capacity until the mid-20th century, when it was turned into an extra meeting place for the church's many groups and boards. Soon thereafter, daycare was held in the parsonage during the church services. Then in the early 1990s, the church's sexton was given the opportunity to live in part of the parsonage, as the front area was turned into offices. These offices were, in turn, rented out to various organizations, such as Esperanza Nueva Iglesia and the YWCA of East Hartford. The parsonage has also been the site of a few community service projects, including the rebuilding of the front steps and railings in a Boy Scout Eagle Project in 2004.

== Architecture ==
The present church is a fine local example of Greek Revival architecture. It is a two-story wood frame structure, with a Greek temple front consisting of six Ionic columns supporting a fully pedimented triangular gable above an entablature that encircles the building. The tympanum of the pediment is adorned with a round wagon-wheel spoked window. A two-story tower with belfry and clock rises above front facade, its corners embellished by pilasters.

== Today ==
First Congregational Church has been a rock in the town of East Hartford, as it is the site of many blood drives for the American Red Cross, home of an East Hartford YMCA First Church child care center serving children ages 3 – 5 years during the weekdays, and, until 2008, was the interim meeting place of Esperanza Nueva Iglesia (New Hope Church), a local Hispanic congregational in search for a more permanent home. First Church is also proud to boast that it is the home of the oldest continuously sponsored Boy Scout troop in the United States. Boy Scout Troop 1 was founded October 14, 1910, and has called First Church home ever since its inception. The troop is now celebrating its 100th anniversary in 2010. There is also a Cub Scout pack the meets at the church, as well as a Girl Scout troop and a Brownie troop.

The members of First Church range in age from newborns to century-old "lifers." First Congregational Church of East Hartford is one of only a handful of churches in the country that can say has had a half-dozen 100-year-old members, with four of them being baptized in the church as babies. The church is currently affiliated with the United Church of Christ. Worship services are held every Sunday at 10am with Sunday School for children (ages infant to high school) held simultaneously.

== See also ==
- National Register of Historic Places listings in Hartford County, Connecticut
