= First Congregational Church (Garnavillo, Iowa) =

- U.S. National Register of Historic Places
- The Garnavillo Historical Museum in 2021

- Location within Iowa Location within the United States
- Location: Washington St. Garnavillo, Iowa
- Coordinates: 42°52′6″N 91°14′16″W
- Area: less than one acre
- Built: 1866
- NRHP reference No.: 77000504
- Added to NRHP: March 25, 1977

First Congregational Church, also known as Garnavillo Historical Museum, was a church whose historic building is located on Washington Street in Garnavillo, Iowa, United States. It was built in 1866 and was added to the National Register of Historic Places in 1977.

The Congregational Church was organized in Garnavillo in 1844 by James J. Hill, a member of the "Iowa Band" of missionaries. This is the second church building constructed by the congregation, and was completed in 1866. After its use as a church, the building has housed a community hall and meeting house, a public library, and a school. It was acquired by the Garnavillo Historical Society in 1965 for use as a local history museum. The 32-by-50-foot (9.8 by 15.2 m) brick structure has a wood bell platform over the front gable. At one time a bell was located in a frame on the platform. The bell now belongs to St. Peter Lutheran Church in Garnavillo.
