= First Congregational Church and Lexington School =

Historic church in Ohio, United States

- First Congregational Church And Lexington School
- U.S. National Register of Historic Places
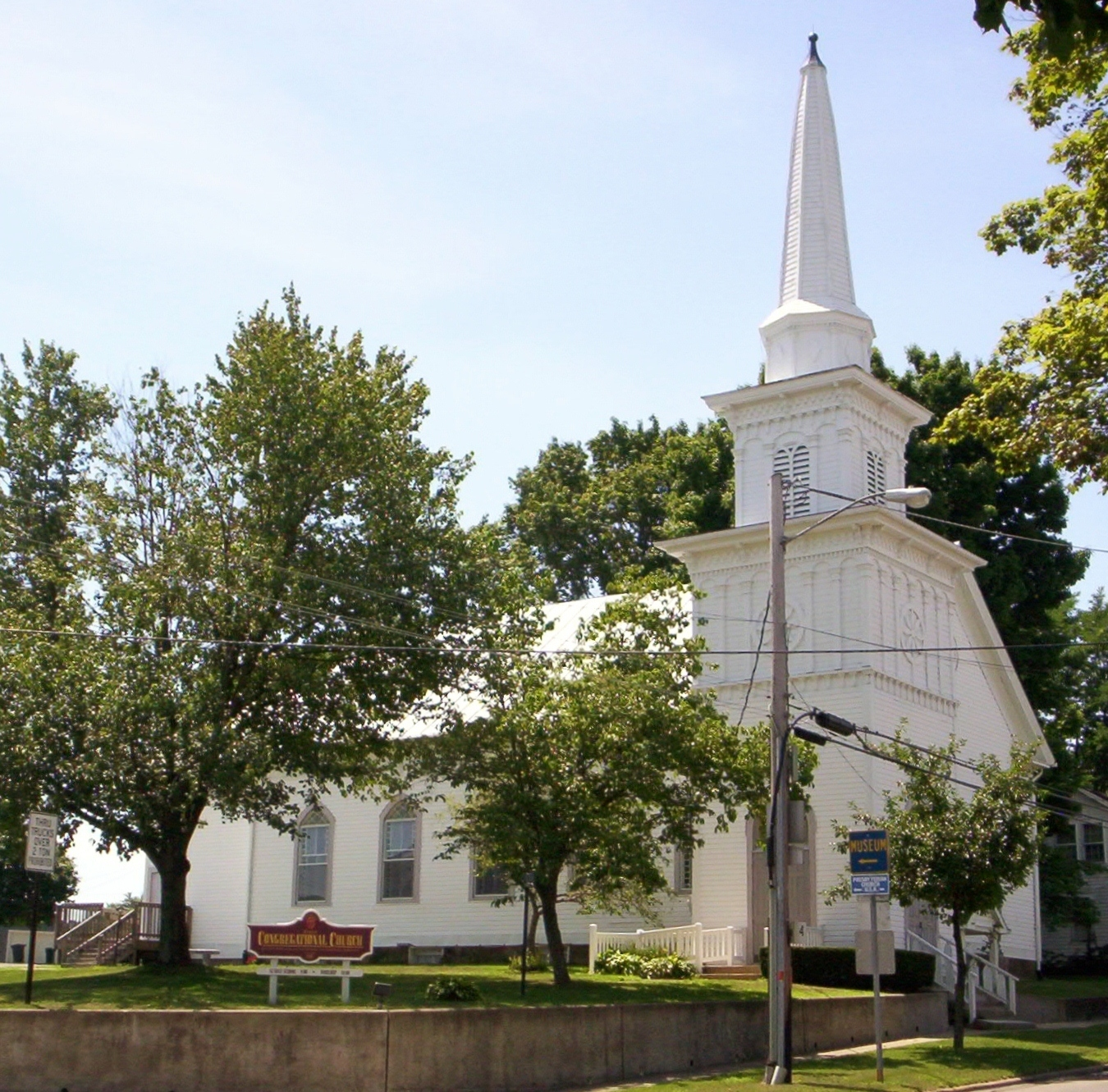

- Location within Ohio Location within the United States
- Location: 47 Delaware St. and 51 W. Church St., Lexington, Ohio
- Coordinates: 40°40′40″N 82°35′07″W
- Area: less than one acre
- Built: church: 1846; school: ca. 1850
- Architectural style: Greek Revival, Gothic Revival
- NRHP reference No.: 79001929
- Added to NRHP: February 23, 1979

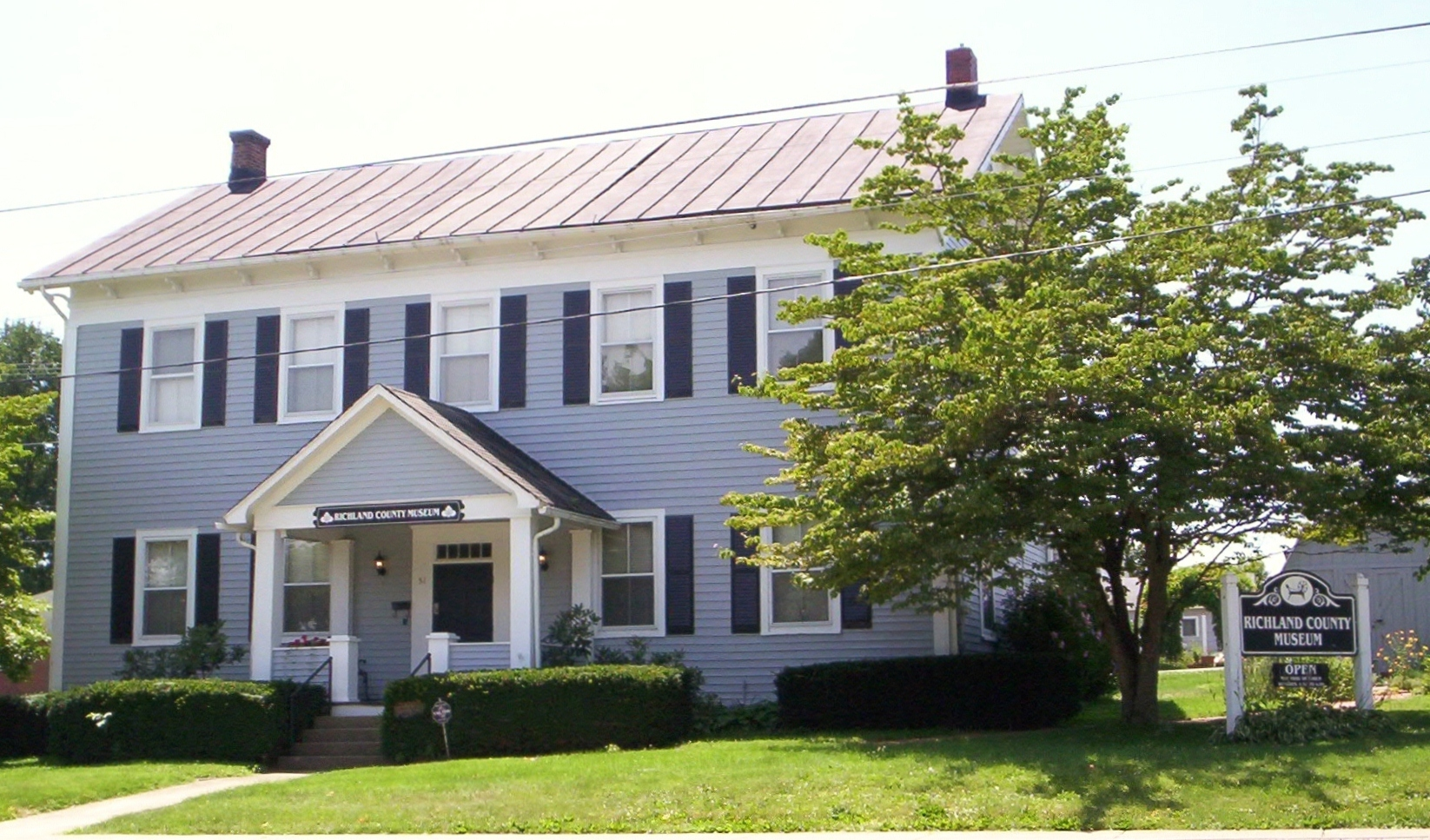
Lexington School is now the Richland County Museum

First Congregational Church and Lexington School (also known as New School Presbyterian Church and the Old Congregational Church) consists of an historic church building located at 47 Delaware Street and an historic school building located at 51 W. Church Street, both in Lexington, Ohio. The school building is now the Richland County Museum.

On February 23, 1979, the two buildings were added to the National Register of Historic Places.
