= First Congregational Church of Blandford =

Historic church in Massachusetts, United States

- U.S. National Register of Historic Places
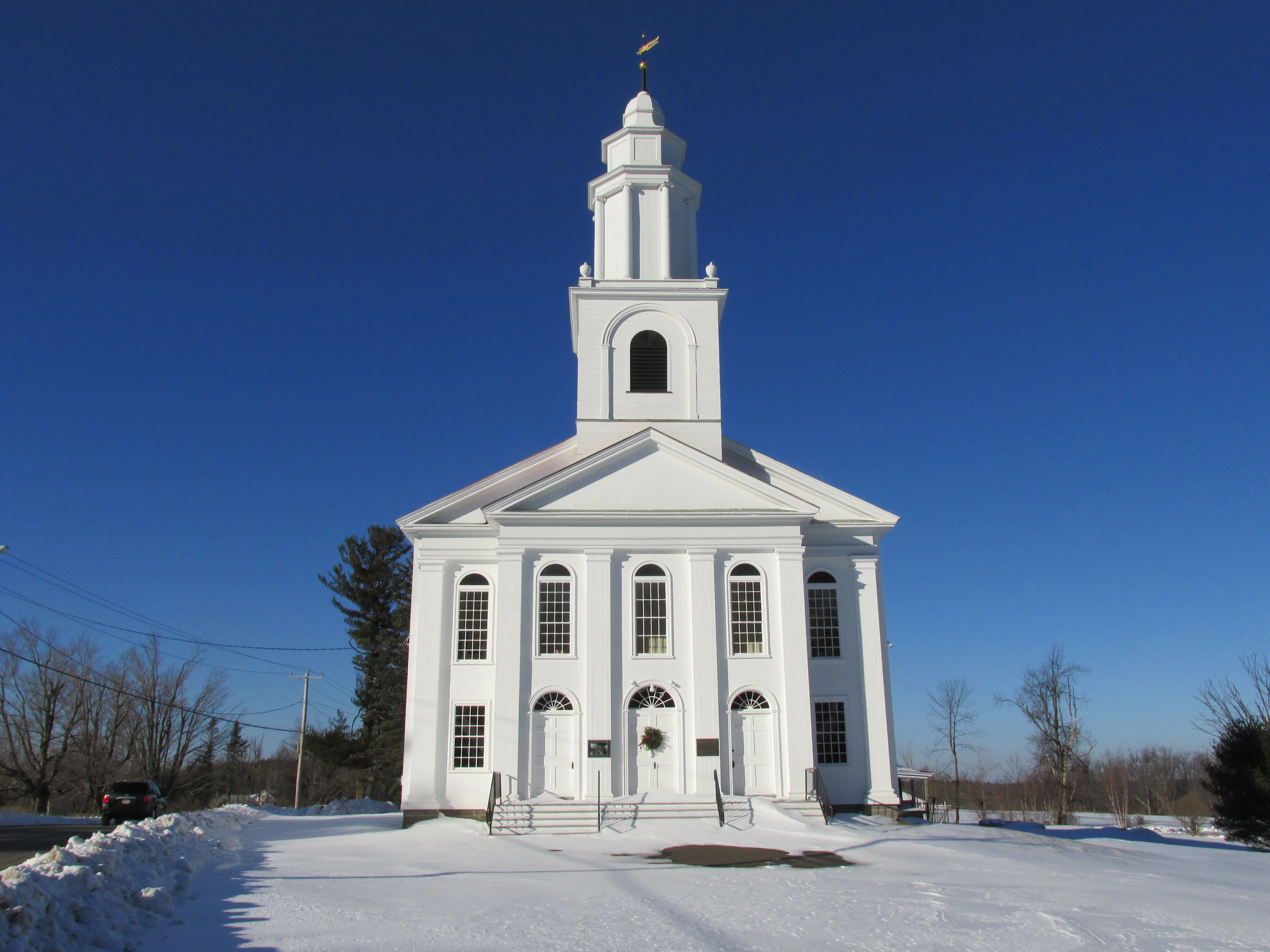

- Location within Massachusetts Location within the United States
- Location: Blandford, Massachusetts
- Coordinates: 42°10′55″N 72°55′45″W
- Built: 1822
- Architect: Isaac Damon
- Architectural style: Federal
- NRHP reference No.: 85003371
- Added to NRHP: October 24, 1985

The First Congregational Church of Blandford (also known locally as the White Church) is a historic church building at 4 North Street in the center of Blandford, Massachusetts. Built in 1822, it is a prominent example of a Federal-style church, built by a leading regional proponent of the style, builder Isaac Damon. It was listed on the National Register of Historic Places in 1985. It is now managed by a local nonprofit as a special event venue.

== Architecture and history ==
Blandford's White Church is located a short way northwest of the village center, at the top of a rise on the east side of North Street. It is a 2-1/2 story wood frame structure, with a gabled roof and clapboarded exterior. The main facade is five bays wide, with the center three set in a projecting section with a pedimented gable. The building corners are pilasters, as are the individual bays of the projection. The center bays each have an entrance on the ground floor, topped by half-round fanlight windows. The second-story windows are also topped by similar fanlights, both on the front and the sides. A multistage tower rises at the front of the building. Its first stage is square, with a belfry that has round-headed louvers framed by arched moulding. The second and third stages are octagonal, and of decreasing size, with engaged Ionic columns at the corners. These are topped by a convex and domed roof and weathervane.

The church was built in 1822 by local builder Isaac Damon, based on designs he had seen by Charles Bulfinch and Asher Benjamin. The church's pulpit was originally placed near the door, so that late arrivals would be seen by the congregation. During renovations this was reversed, placing the pulpit at the back of the building. In the 1990s the church was restored and acquired by the Blandford Historical Society.

== See also ==
- National Register of Historic Places listings in Hampden County, Massachusetts
