= Portland First Congregational Church =

Historic church in Michigan, United States

- U.S. National Register of Historic Places
- Michigan State Historic Site
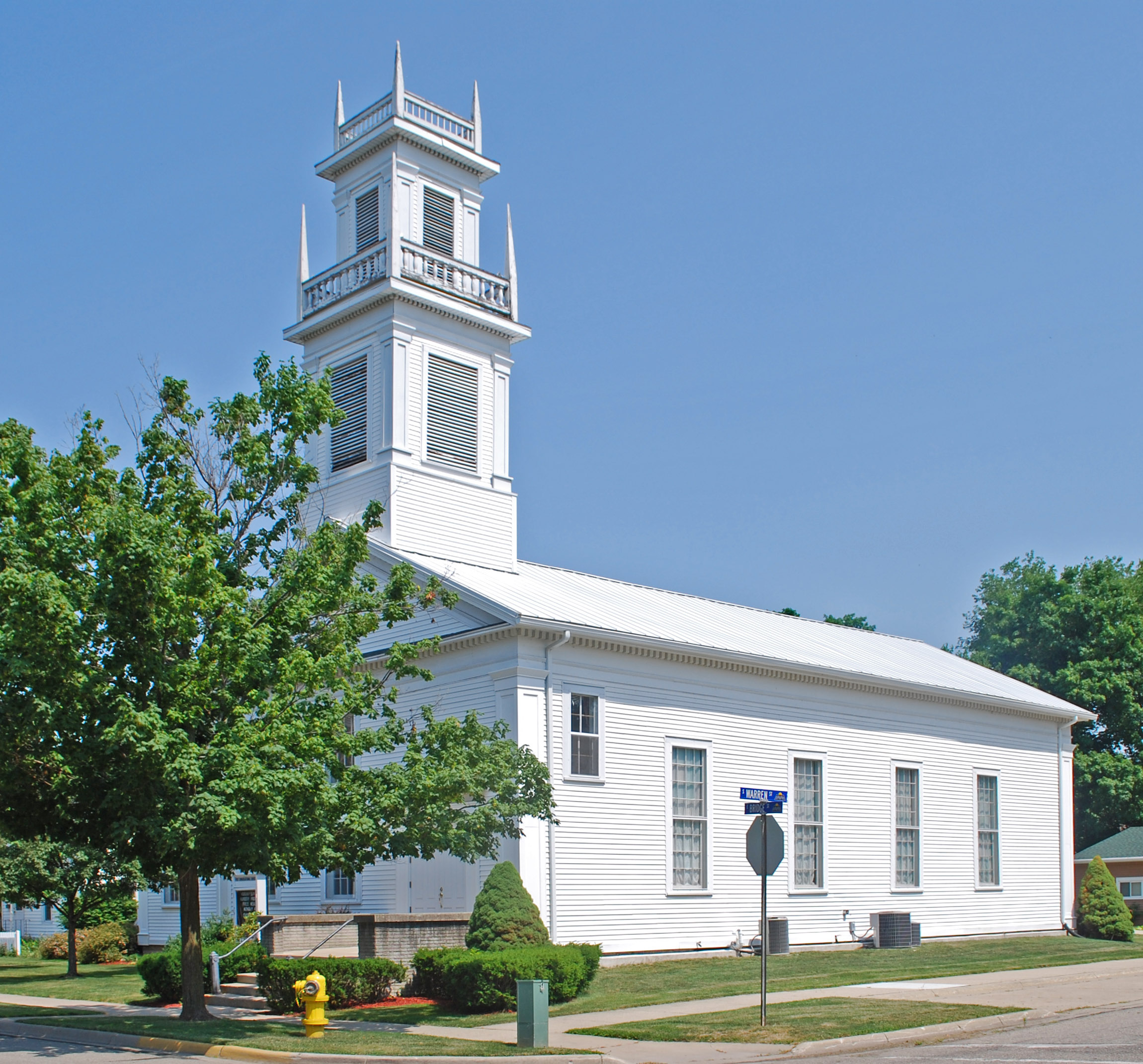
- First Congregational Church, 2011

- Location within Michigan Location within the United States
- Interactive map
- Location: 421 E. Bridge St., Portland, Michigan
- Coordinates: 42°52′5″N 84°54′0″W
- Area: less than one acre
- Built: 1853
- Built by: Baruch G. Cooley
- Architectural style: Greek Revival
- Demolished: 2015
- NRHP reference No.: 84000542
- Added to NRHP: December 27, 1984

The Portland First Congregational Church is a historic church located at 421 E. Bridge Street in Portland, Michigan. The original Greek Revival style church was built in 1853 and added to the National Register of Historic Places in 1984. In 2015, the church was demolished by a tornado; it was rebuilt in 2016 in a style true to the original.

== History ==
The Portland First Congregational Church was organized in 1843 by the Reverend LeMoyne S. Smith, who had been sent by the American Home Missionary Society. They first met in a barn, then a log schoolhouse and various other temporary locations. Reverend Henry Root, the first resident pastor, arrived in 1851. Root raised the necessary funds to construct a permanent church, and in 1853 this building was constructed under the supervision of Baruch G. Cooley, a deacon at the church. The original location was on Kent Street, near the Grand River.

In 1868, the congregation was divided when a portion left to start a Presbyterian congregation. The two congregations continued independently for eight years, after which they rejoined. In 1877 the church building was moved from its original location to the present site. After the move, the building was expanded, and the interior walls and floor redone. An organ was purchased in 1879 and a parsonage constructed in 1887. The total expenditures from the move and subsequent constructions financially strained the church, which was on the edge of disbandment for many years.

However, after 1900, a neighboring Universalist Church disbanded, with many of the congregants joining the Congregational Church. The influx of new people allowed the church to thrive, and in 1913-14 they added a wing to the building. The fortunes of the congregation waxed and waned during the remainder of the twentieth century, with lagging support in the 1930s, but major renovations to the building in the 1950s and 1978.

In 2014, a substantial reconstruction of the bell tower was undertaken. However, in June 2015, a tornado passed through Portland, destroying a number of buildings, including the First Congregational Church. The remainder of the church was demolished a few days later. However, reconstruction began immediately, and a new building, similar in style to the original church, was finished by early 2016.

== Description ==
The original 1853 church was a rectangular Greek Revival structure measuring 35 feet by 85 feet with a low gable roof and sandstone foundation. It had a later two-story addition measuring 30 feet by 36 feet, making it L-shaped in plan. A square bell tower clad with narrow clapboards was located above the front gable peak. A full entablature ran around the entire church, supported by paneled pilasters at the building corners. The front had an off-center doorway with two windows nearby and two on the second story. The side had four sixteen-over-sixteen windows and a small, four-over-four window.
