= First Congregational Church of LaMoille =

Historic church in Illinois, United States

- U.S. National Register of Historic Places
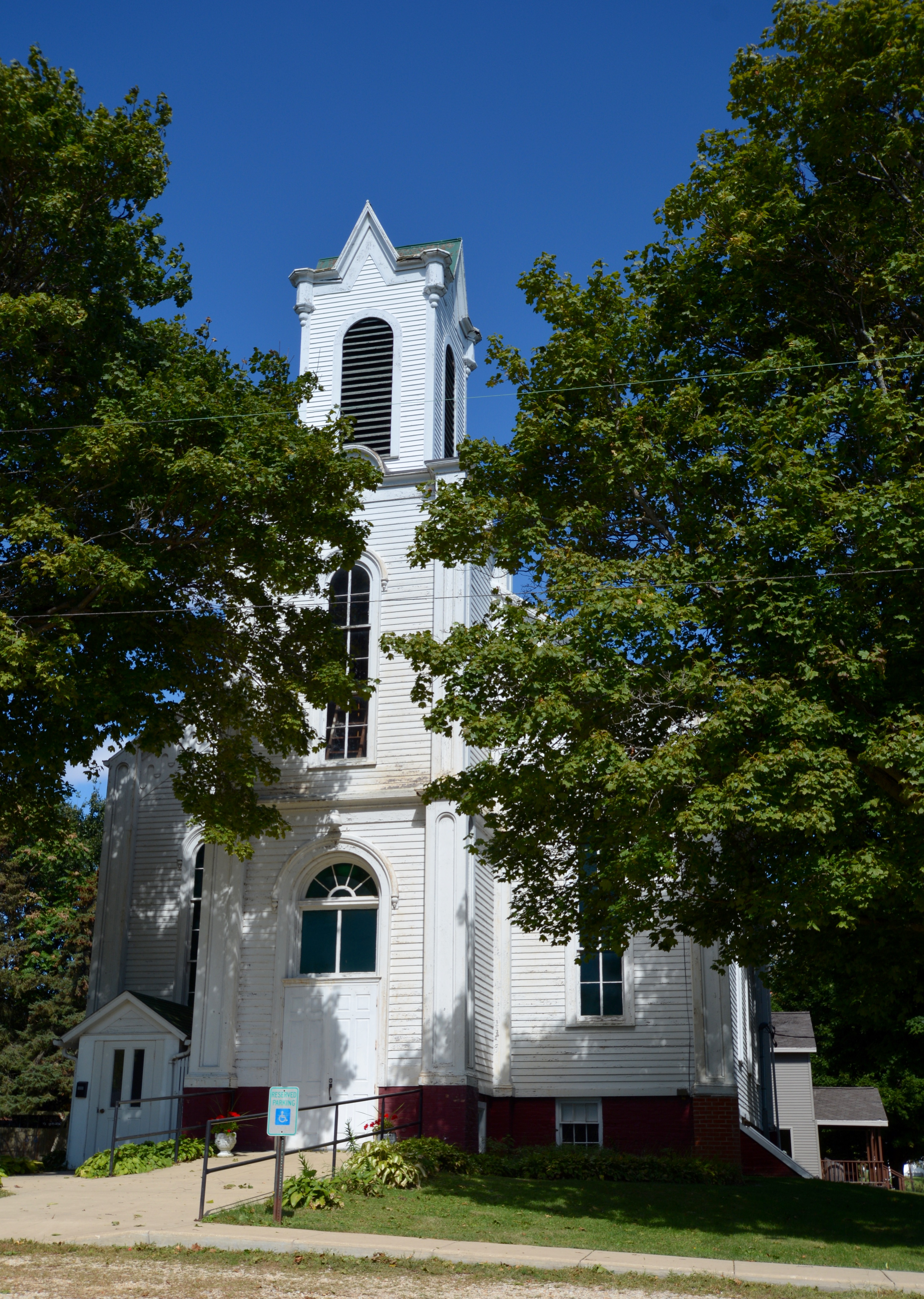

- Location within Illinois Location within the United States
- Location: 94 Franklin St., LaMoille, Illinois
- Coordinates: 41°31′51″N 89°16′47″W
- Area: less than one acre
- Built: 1867
- Architectural style: Italianate
- NRHP reference No.: 96000059
- Added to NRHP: February 16, 1996

The First Congregational Church of LaMoille is a historic church located at 94 Franklin Street in La Moille, Illinois, United States. The building was constructed in 1867 for La Moille's Congregational church, which was established by Owen Lovejoy in 1840. The church was designed in the Italianate style, which was growing in popularity at the time. Its design features tall arched windows, a tower atop the main entrance, decorative pilasters at the corners, and corbelling along the front cornice. The church originally included several Gothic Revival features as well, such as a spire steeple and pinnacles, but these fell into disrepair and were removed.

The church was added to the National Register of Historic Places on February 16, 1996.
