= First Congregational Church of Sterling =

Historic church in Illinois, United States

- The Big Red Church - First Congregational Church of Sterling
- U.S. National Register of Historic Places
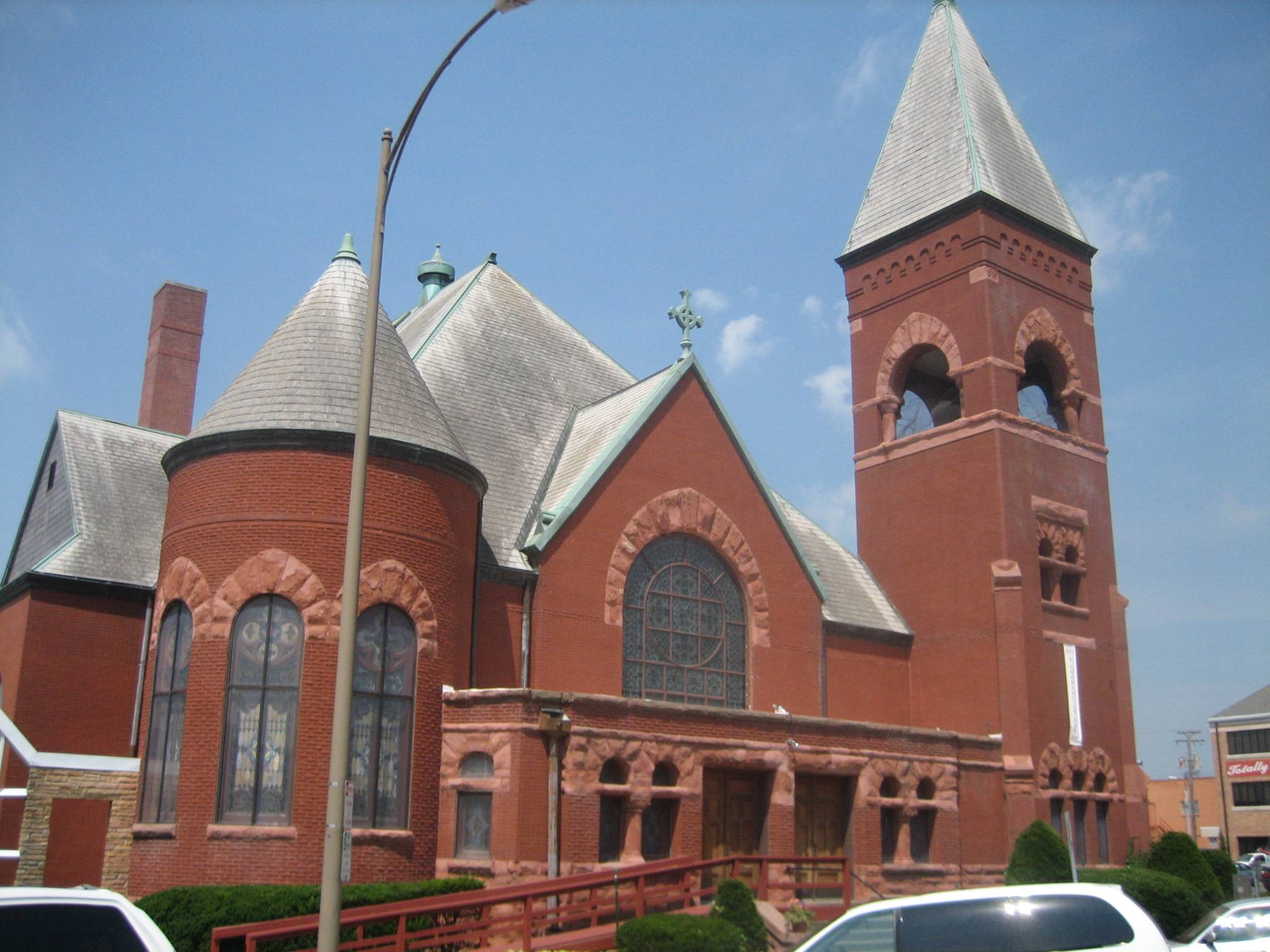

- Location within Illinois Location within the United States
- Location: 311 Second Ave., Sterling, Illinois
- Coordinates: 41°47′21″N 89°41′37″W
- Area: less than one acre
- Built: 1898
- Architect: Wesley Arnold
- Architectural style: Richardsonian Romanesque
- NRHP reference No.: 95001234
- Added to NRHP: November 7, 1995

The First Congregational Church of Sterling is a historic church in Sterling, Illinois, United States. The church was built in 1897 and 1898 and is an example of Richardsonian Romanesque architecture. It was added to the National Register of Historic Places in 1995.

== History ==
On May 15, 1896 it was announced that the Congregationalists in Sterling were set to construct a new church. Later that year, on July 1, it was reported in the local Sterling Gazette that an architect's design had been selected and that the church would cost a total of US$15,000. In the end the building cost US$25,000 to erect. Construction was completed between 1897–98.

== Architecture ==
The building is constructed of red Portage sandstone and is located in the heart of downtown Sterling. The church's square tower rises 100 feet (30 m) into the air and dominates the structure. The building also features some of the most elaborate stained glass fenestration in Sterling. In fact, it has been reported that locals sometimes knew the building only as "the church with the windows". The auditorium is semi-circular and octagonal in shape.

The First Congregational Church of Sterling was designed by architect Wesley Arnold in the Richardsonian Romanesque style and built by builder P.J. Van Horne. The building has several elements of the style including: heavy sandstone foundation which contrasts with smooth and rough faced brick, wide round arches over rows of windows, and the buildings two towers. The building is laid out in what was known as the "Akron Plan". The Akron Plan for church buildings was popularized by architectural pattern books and featured a semi-circular auditorium surrounded by segmented Sunday school classrooms on one or two floors.

== Historic significance ==
The First Congregational Church is significant for its architecture as a local example of a Richardsonian Romanesque religious building. It is the only church of its kind in all of Whiteside County. The church is also locally significant as a religious institution. It was added to the National Register of Historic Places November 7, 1995.
