= First Congregational Church and Parsonage (Prescott, Arizona) =

Historic church in Arizona, United States

Coordinates: 34.5420°N 112.4663°W

- U.S. National Register of Historic Places
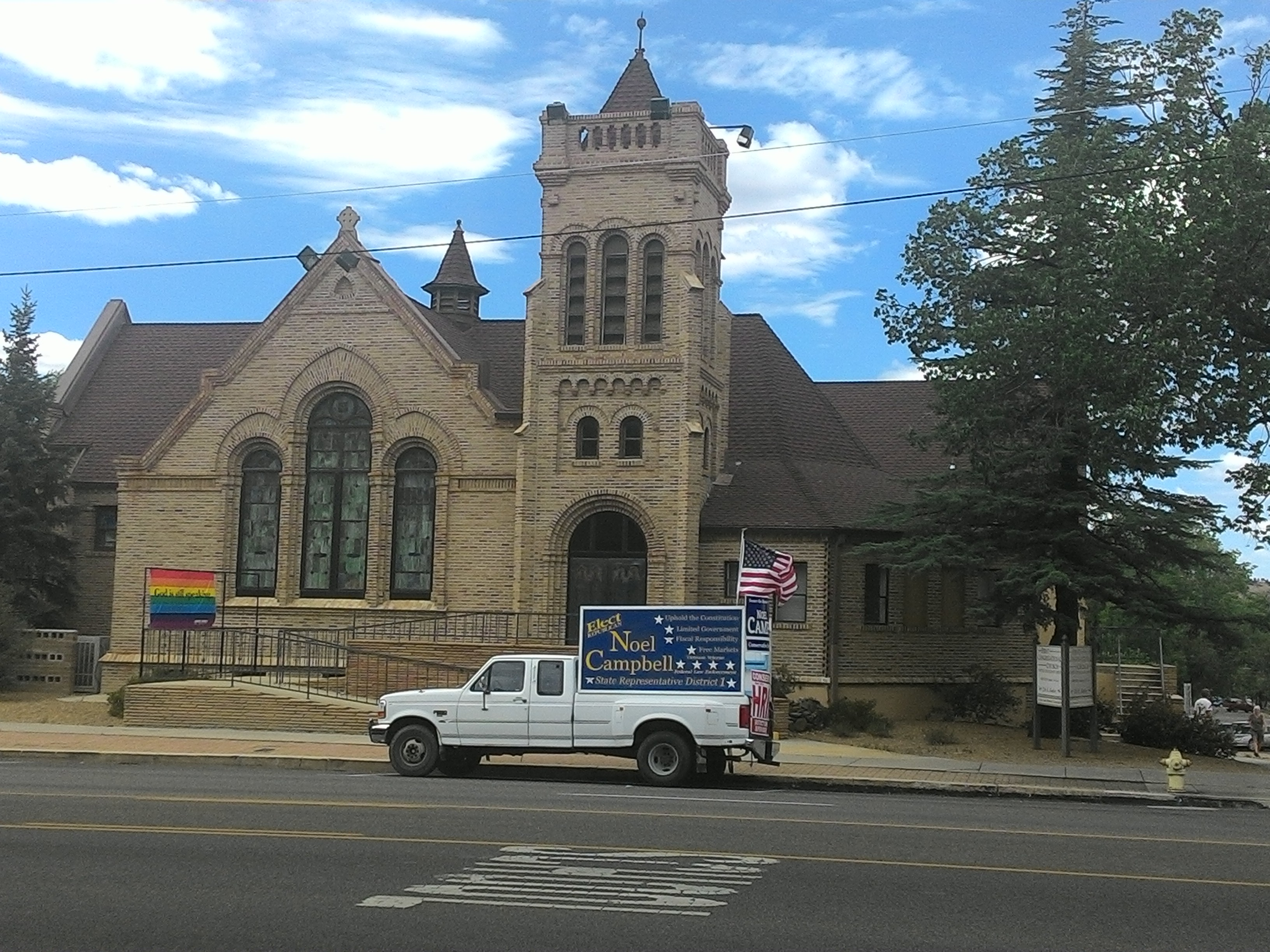

- Location within Arizona Location within the United States
- Location: 216--220 E. Gurley, Prescott, Arizona
- Area: 0 acres (0 ha)
- Built: 1899
- Architectural style: Late Victorian, Romanesque
- MPS: Prescott Territorial Buildings MRA
- NRHP reference No.: 78003227
- Added to NRHP: December 14, 1978

First Congregational Church and Parsonage is a historic church and parsonage site at 216–220 E. Gurley in Prescott, Arizona.

It was built in 1899 and added to the National Register in 1978. The congregation was founded in 1880 and was the first in the Southwest Conference. The congregation is currently affiliated with the United Church of Christ (UCC).
