= First Congregational Church of Bay Shore =

Historic church in New York, United States

- U.S. National Register of Historic Places
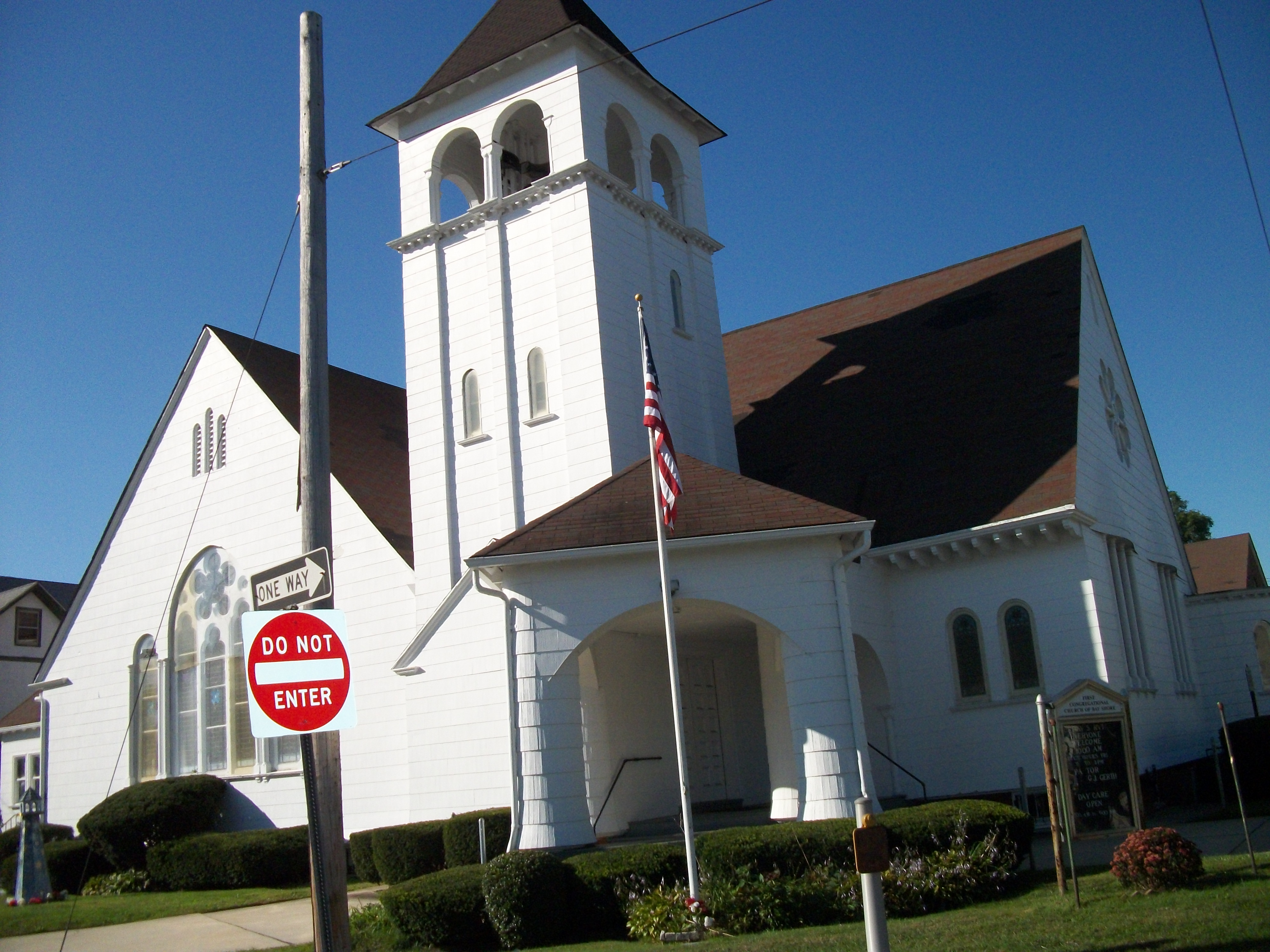
- The First Congregational Church of Bay Shore as seen from Union Boulevard and First Street.

- Location within New York Location within the United States
- Location: 1860 Union Boulevard, Bay Shore, New York
- Coordinates: 40°43′33″N 73°14′46″W
- Area: less than one acre
- Built: 1891
- Architect: Stephenson & Greene
- Architectural style: Romanesque, Queen Anne
- NRHP reference No.: 02000448
- Added to NRHP: May 03, 2002

First Congregational Church of Bay Shore is a historic Congregational church complex at 1860 Union Boulevard (SCR 50) on the corner of First Street at Bay Shore, Suffolk County, New York, United States. Contributing elements of the complex consists of three attached units: the 1891 Romanesque Revival / Shingle Style church and rectory. The church is a cruciform plan, gable roofed structure that features a square bell tower and porte cochere. The interior of the church features a variation on the Akron plan configuration. It was designed by Stephenson & Greene of New York.

It was added to the National Register of Historic Places in 2002.
