= First Congregational Church of Otto =

Historic church in New York, United States

- U.S. National Register of Historic Places
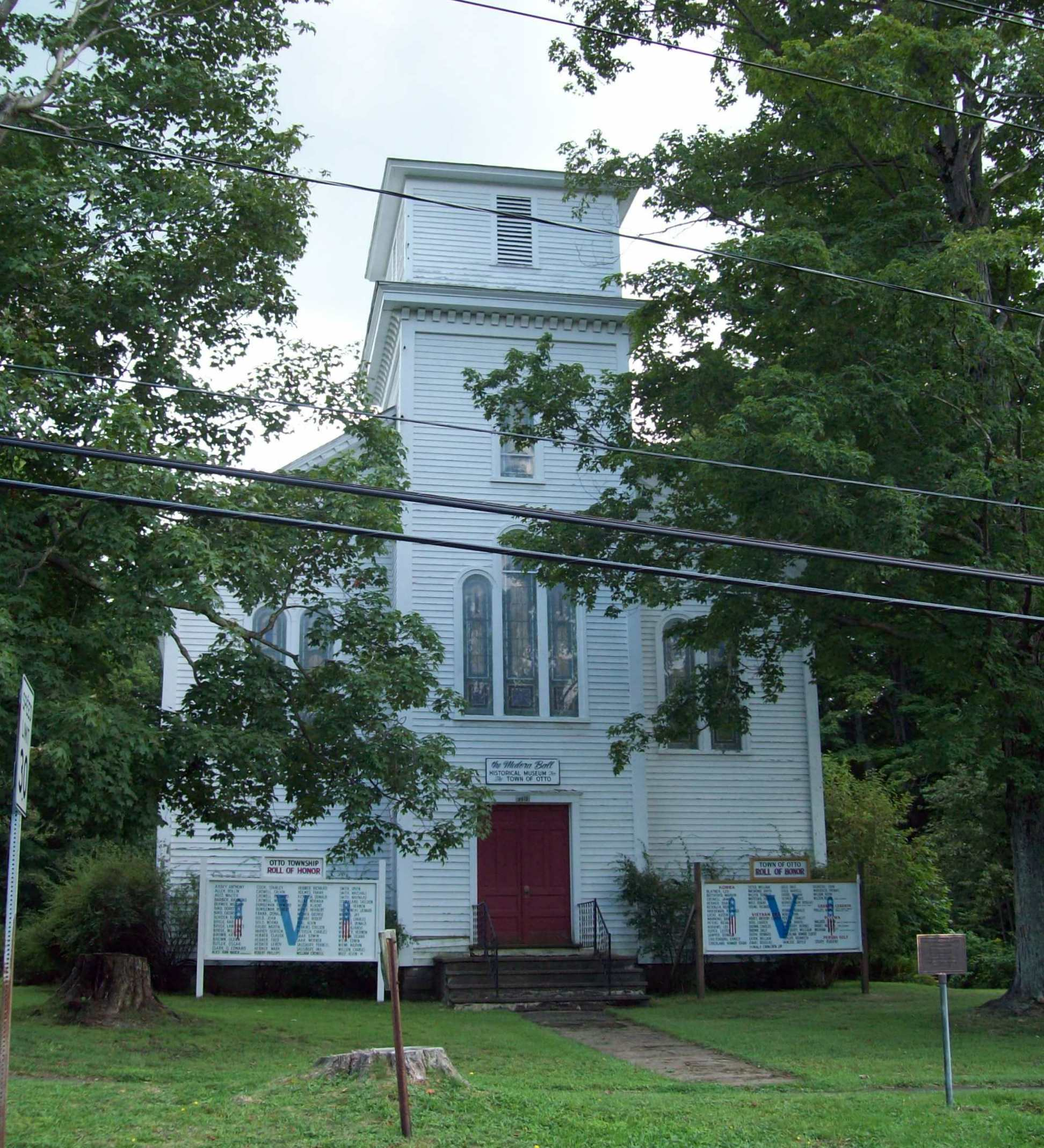
- Medora Ball Historical Museum, August 2010

- Location within New York Location within the United States
- Location: 9019 Main St., Otto, New York
- Coordinates: 42°21′19″N 78°49′40″W
- Built: 1861
- Architectural style: Vernacular
- NRHP reference No.: 99000194
- Added to NRHP: February 12, 1999

First Congregational Church of Otto, now known as the Medora Ball Historical Museum, is a historic Congregational church building located at Otto in Cattaraugus County, New York. It was built in 1861 and is in a vernacular Italianate style. The building served as a hub of religious and social life in this rural community. An original steeple was removed in 1917 after being severely damaged by a tornado. The church underwent a major remodeling in 1925. The last regular church service was held in 1946. In 1969, the building was deeded to the Cattaraugus Area Historical Society. It was renamed in 1994 the Medora Ball Historical Museum, after the Otto town historian.

It was listed on the National Register of Historic Places in 1999.
