= First Congregational Church (Rapid City, South Dakota) =

Historic church in South Dakota, United States

- U.S. National Register of Historic Places
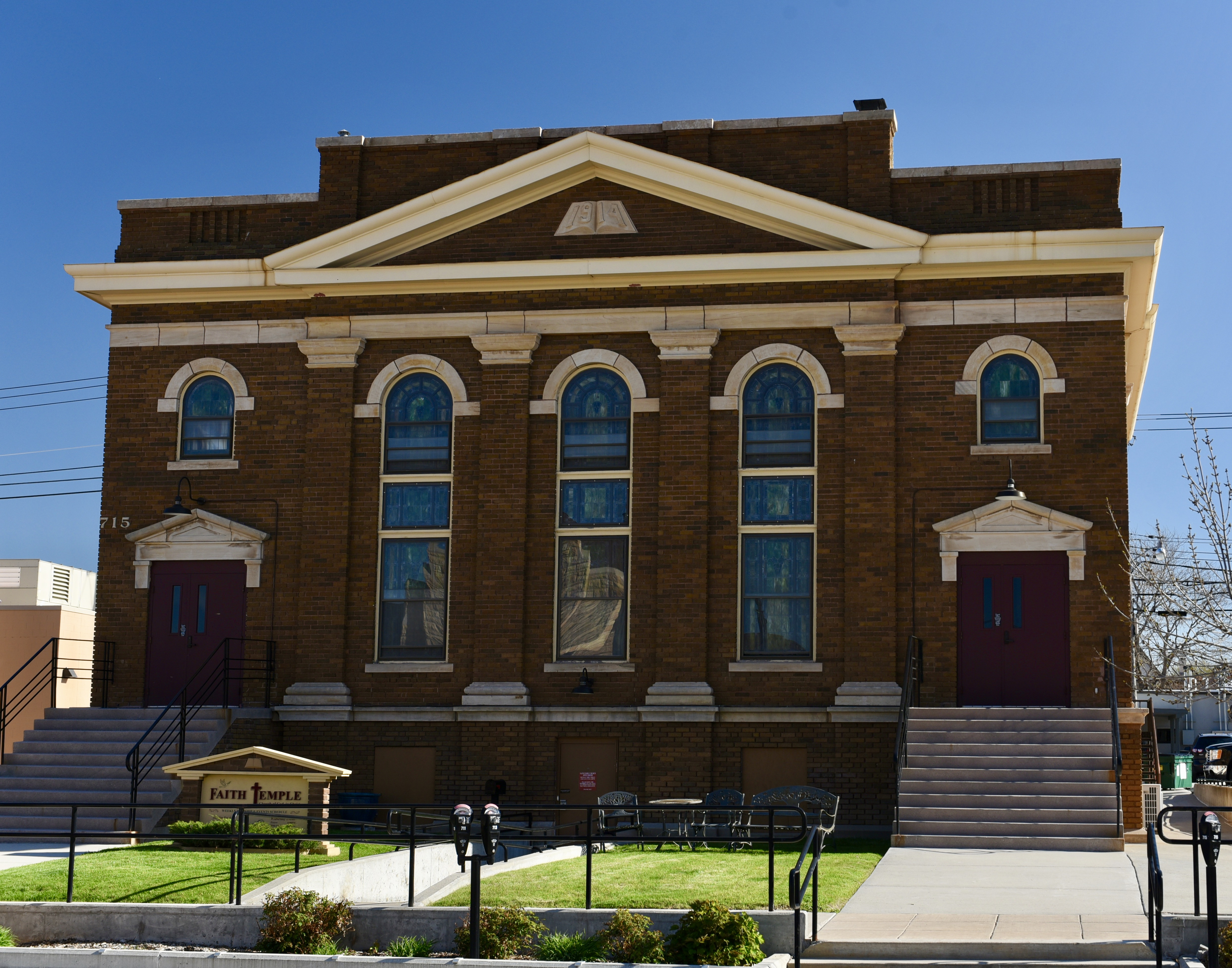

- Location within South Dakota Location within the United States
- Location: 715 Kansas City St. Rapid City, South Dakota
- Coordinates: 44°4′45″N 103°13′47″W
- Area: less than one acre
- Built: 1914
- Architect: Waldrum, H. E.
- Architectural style: Renaissance
- NRHP reference No.: 84003372
- Added to NRHP: February 23, 1984

The First Congregational Church in Rapid City, South Dakota, also known as The Lord's Chapel, is a historic church at 715 Kansas City Street. It was built in 1914 and was added to the National Register in 1984.

It is a two-story masonry and brick building which is about 55 by 73 feet (17 m × 22 m) in plan.
