= First Congregational Church (Akron, Ohio) =

Historic church in Ohio, United States

- U.S. National Register of Historic Places
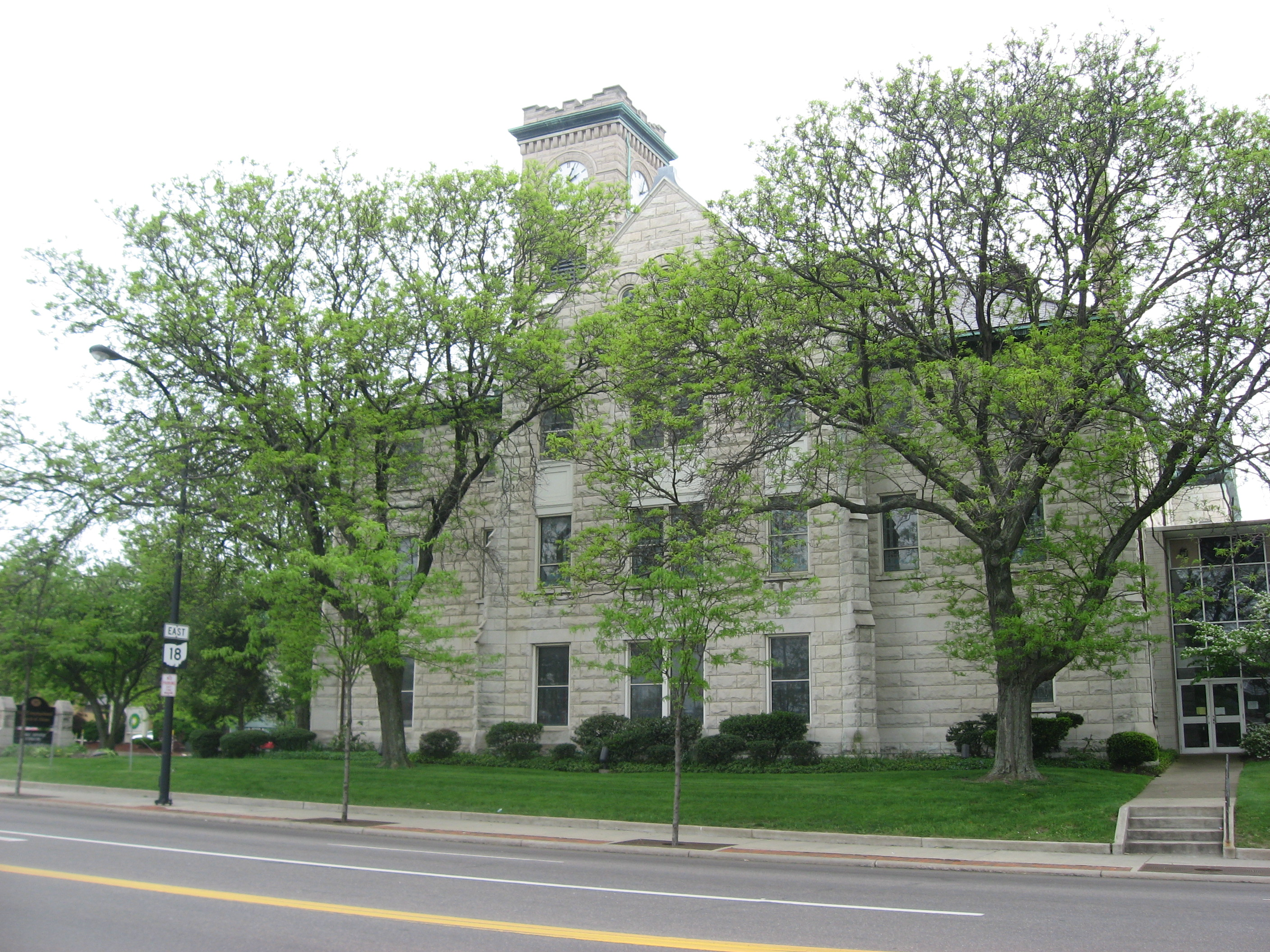
- Front of the church

- Location within Ohio Location within the United States
- Location: 292 E. Market St., Akron, Ohio
- Coordinates: 41°4′53″N 81°30′31″W
- Area: less than one acre
- Built: 1910
- Architect: Charles Henry & Son; Frank, Wagner & Mitchell
- Architectural style: Romanesque, Bungalow/Craftsman
- NRHP reference No.: 04000061
- Added to NRHP: February 20, 2004

First Congregational Church is a historic church at 292 E. Market Street in Akron, Ohio.

The current building was built in 1910 and added to the National Register in 2004. The congregation was chartered in 1835, making it Akron's oldest.

It is a part of the United Church of Christ.
