= First Congregational Church (Riverside, California) =

Church in Riverside, California

Coordinates: 33.9817°N 117.3720°W

First Congregational Church of Riverside is a Christian church in Riverside, California, US.

== Overview ==
The church was founded in 1872 and is a part of the United Church of Christ (UCC). The congregation has a long history of social activism and continues to be a voice for progressive Christianity in the Inland Empire area.

== History ==
FCC was founded on April 1, 1872 and was the first Protestant church established within the city limits of Riverside CA.

Frank Miller, owner and proprietor of the Mission Inn, became a member in 1878 and led the effort to build the current building which was completed in 1914. The building was designed by Myron Hunt in the Spanish Churrigueresque (Baroque) style. It is located at 3504 Mission Inn Ave, Riverside and is now designated as a historical landmark.

== Values ==
FCC is not a creedal or dogmatic church and welcomes diverse Christian beliefs. New members are asked to “covenant to walk together as we seek to be faithful to Christ.”.

FCC offers Sunday religious services, Bible studies and Taize prayer services.

== Justice Work ==
Generations of FCC members have taken stands for justice and equality over the years. Booker T. Washington accepted an invitation to speak for the congregation on March 22, 1914. During the internment of Japanese Americans in World War II, FCC held the assets of the Japanese American church in Riverside so the property could be returned to the rightful owners at the end of the internment. In 1995, FCC became an Open and Affirming congregation, celebrating people of all walks of life in full membership of the church, including LGBT individuals. The congregation continues today to take stands of justice, including Black Lives Matter, support of Muslim communities and LGBT equality.

In 2022 the church celebrated its 150th year.

As of 2023, the church has several ministries including a free clinic, meals and books for homeless people and a choir as well as other work through UCC.

== See also ==
- First Congregational Church of Riverside
