= First Congregational Church (Platteville, Wisconsin) =

Historic church in Wisconsin, United States

- U.S. National Register of Historic Places
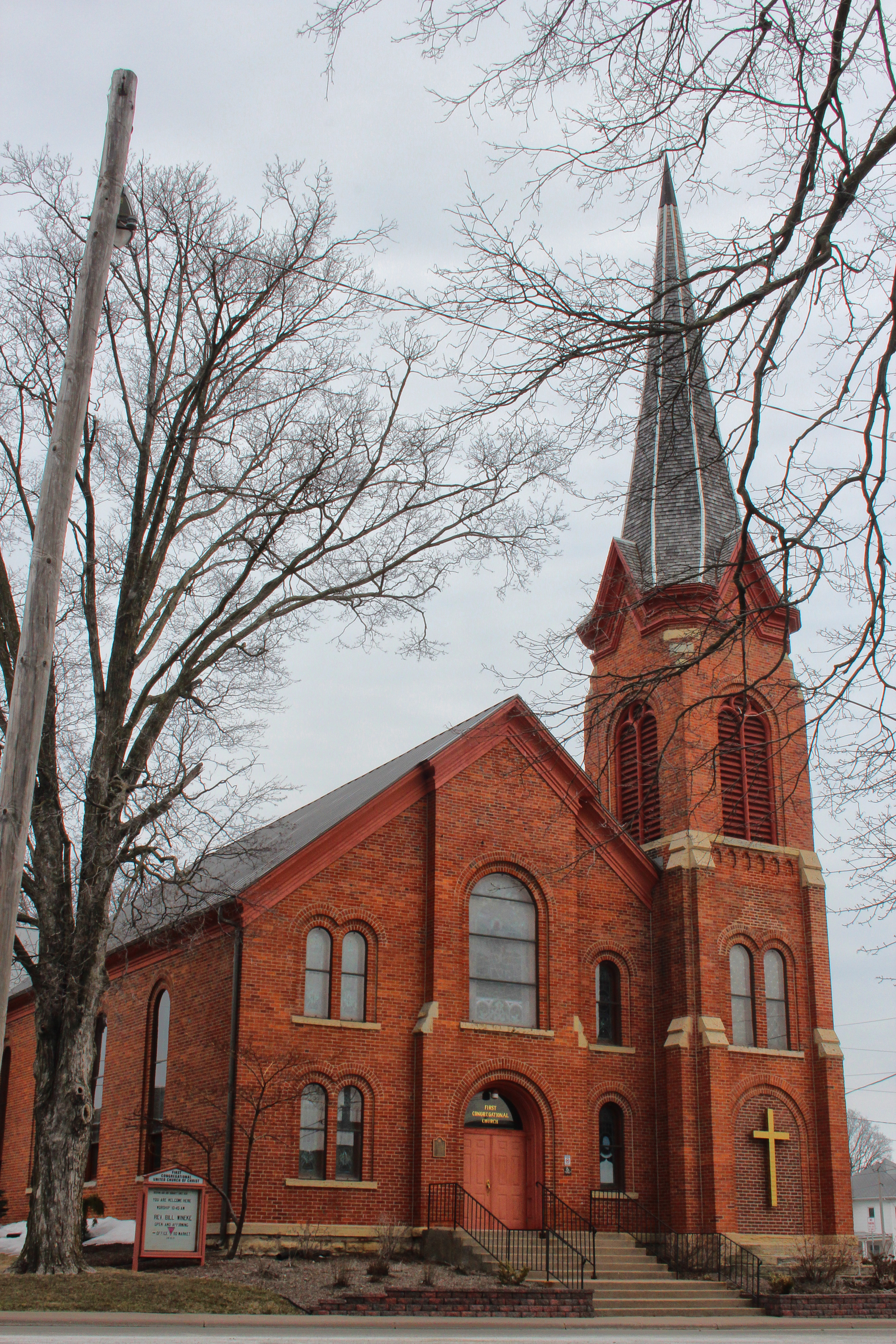

- Location within Wisconsin Location within the United States
- Location: 80 Market St., Platteville, Wisconsin
- Coordinates: 42°44′9″N 90°28′42″W
- Area: less than one acre
- Built: 1869
- Architect: George Nettleton
- Architectural style: vernacular Romanesque
- NRHP reference No.: 85001359
- Added to NRHP: June 19, 1985

The First Congregational Church is a historic church building at 80 Market Street in Platteville, Wisconsin. The church was built in 1869 to replace the congregation's original 1846 building; the congregation itself was formed in 1839. Notable parishioners in the early congregation included Alvin M. Dixon, who started a school in the church that evolved into the University of Wisconsin–Platteville, and Adrian Van Vliet, founder of the University of Dubuque. Architect George Nettleton of Janesville designed the Romanesque building; his design featured a red brick exterior with semicircular arched doors and windows, as well as a steepled belfry more characteristic of the Gothic Revival style. A brick addition was placed on the rear of the building in 1895, and the congregation added stained glass windows in 1903. The church was added to the National Register of Historic Places on June 19, 1985, for its architectural significance.
