= First Congregational Church of Cuyahoga Falls =

Historic church in Ohio, United States

- U.S. National Register of Historic Places
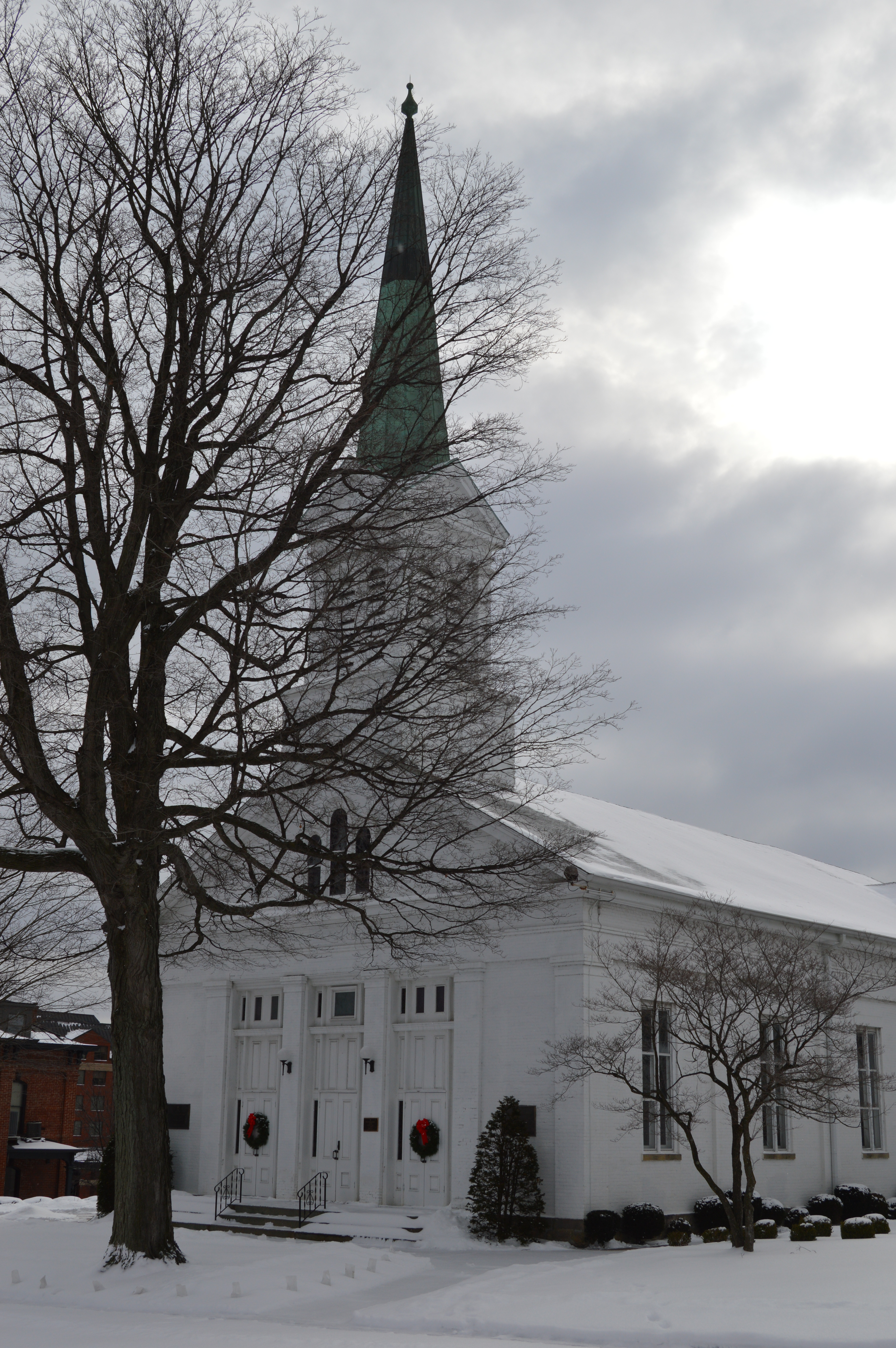
- Front of the church

- Location within Ohio Location within the United States
- Location: 130 Broad Blvd., Cuyahoga Falls, Ohio
- Coordinates: 41°8′0″N 81°29′4″W
- Area: less than one acre
- Built: 1847
- NRHP reference No.: 75001538
- Added to NRHP: November 3, 1975

First Congregational Church of Cuyahoga Falls (also known as Pilgrim United Church of Christ) is a historic church at 130 Broad Boulevard in Cuyahoga Falls, Ohio.

It was built in 1847 and added to the National Register of Historic Places in 1975.
