= First Congregational Church of Riverside =

Historic church in California, United States

- U.S. National Register of Historic Places
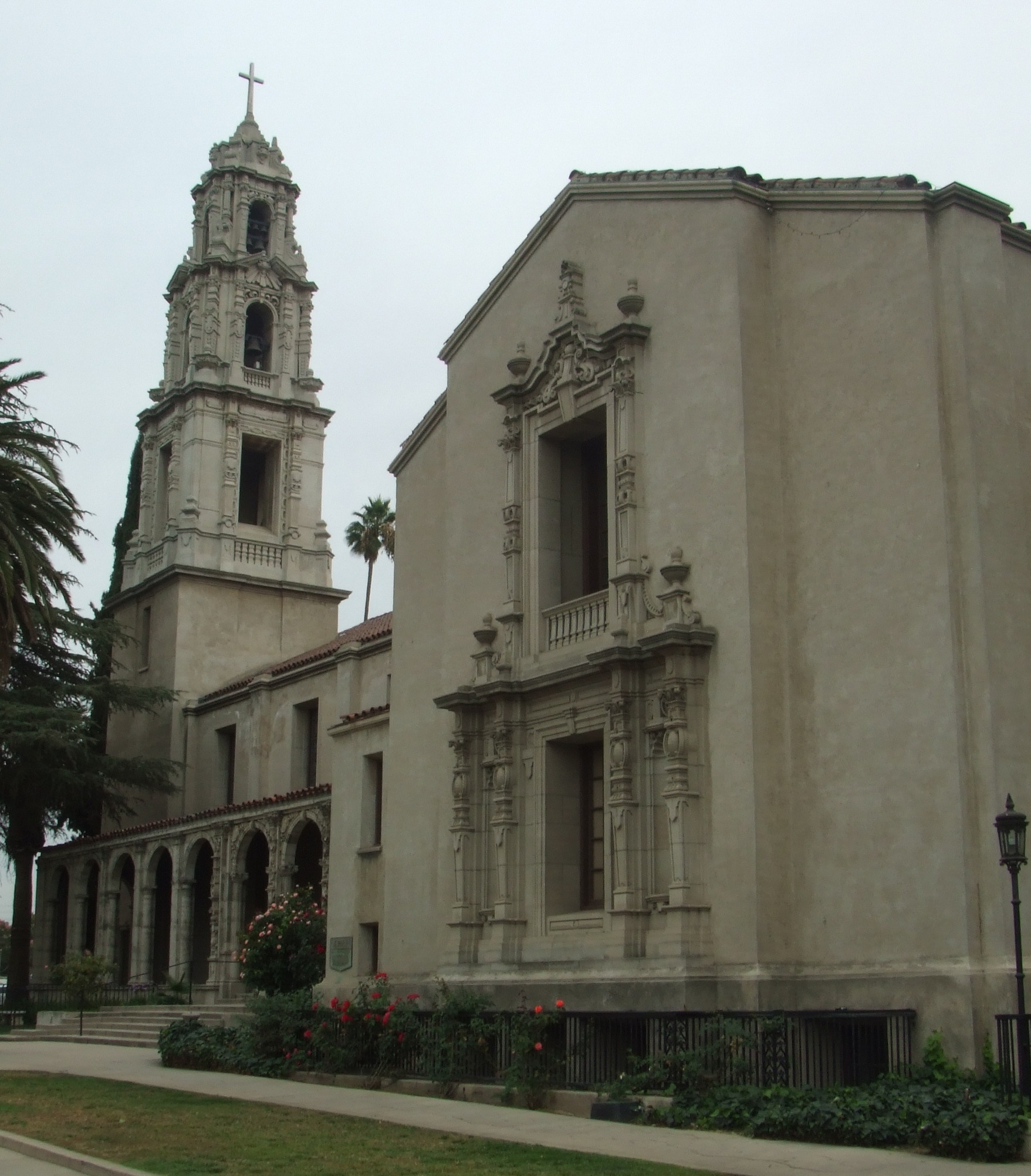

- Location within California Location within the United States
- Location: 3504 Mission Inn Ave., Riverside, California
- Coordinates: 33°58′54″N 117°22′16″W
- Area: 0.8 acres (0.32 ha)
- Built: 1913
- Architect: Elmer Grey Myron Hunt
- Architectural style: Spanish Colonial Revival
- NRHP reference No.: 97000297
- Added to NRHP: April 3, 1997

The First Congregational Church of Riverside is a historic United Church of Christ church at 3504 Mission Inn Avenue in Riverside, California. It was designed by Myron Hunt, and built in 1913. It was added to the National Register in 1997.

It is a two-story Spanish Colonial Revival building with a Latin cross plan with a 125 feet (38 m) Churrigueresque style corner tower.

== Overview ==
The church was founded in 1872 and is a part of the United Church of Christ (UCC).

The congregation has a long history of social activism and continues to be a voice for progressive Christianity in the Inland Empire area.

== See also ==
First Congregational Church (Riverside, California)
