= Whitneyville =

Whitneyville may refer to a community in the United States:

- Whitneyville, Connecticut
- Whitneyville, Maine
