= Whitneyville, Connecticut =

Whitneyville
- neighborhood
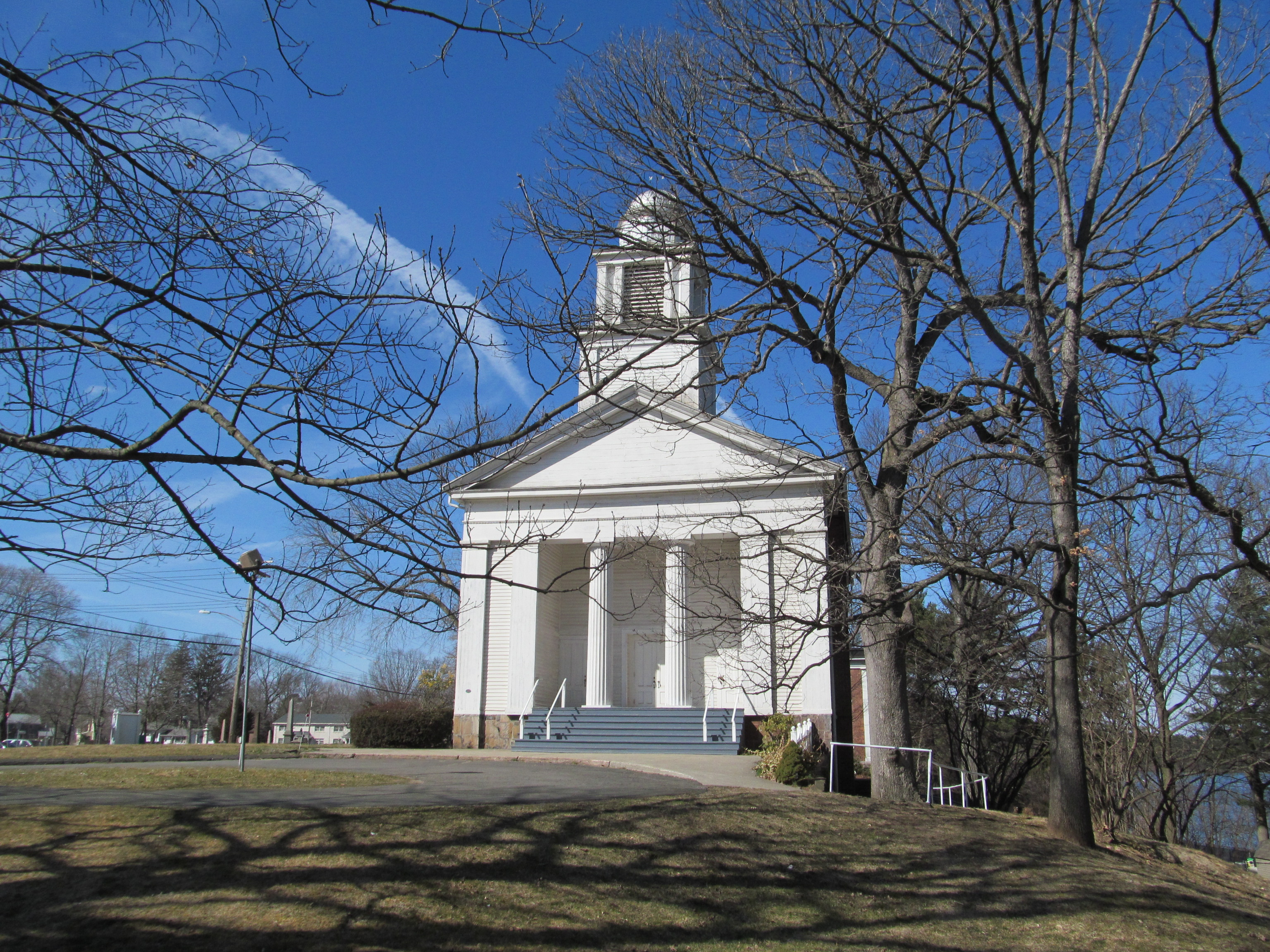
- Whitneyville Congregational Church near the center of Whitneyville
- Country: United States
- State: Connecticut
- County (non-governmental): New Haven
- Town: Hamden

Population
  - Total: 5,112

Whitneyville is a neighborhood in the southeastern portion of the town of Hamden, Connecticut. It started in the early nineteenth century as a factory town for workers in Eli Whitney's gun factory. Around the turn of the twentieth century, it evolved into a trolley suburb of New Haven. Today it is primarily residential, with a mixture of single-family homes and small apartment and condominium buildings. There is some commercial development centered around the intersection of Whitney and Putnam avenues.

There are no officially established boundaries for the neighborhood. One map has it bounded on the north by the northern part of Lake Whitney and Waite Street, on the east by Hartford Turnpike and the Mill River, on the south by the New Haven city line, and on the west by parts of Newhall Street, Putnam Avenue, and Farmington Canal Heritage Trail. The census tract with GEOID 09009165400, corresponding closely to these boundaries, had a population of 5,112, as of the 2010 census.

== History ==
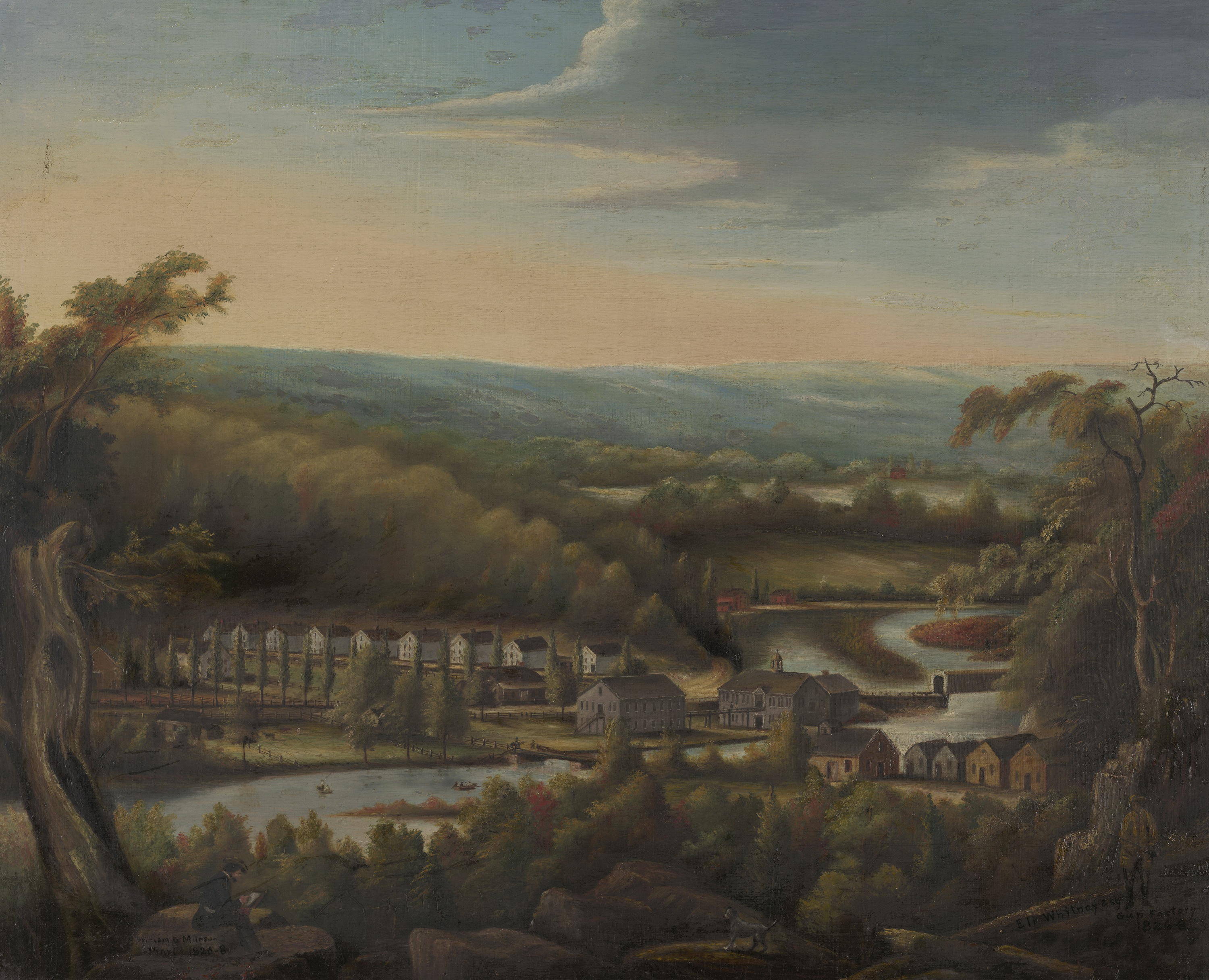
Whitneyville in 1827.

Several grist mills were established in what is now the neighborhood as early as 1640. Eli Whitney chose a mill at the base of East Rock, with water power from the Mill River, as the site of his gun factory in 1798, and built a boarding house for unmarried workers nearby, establishing the village of Whitneyville.

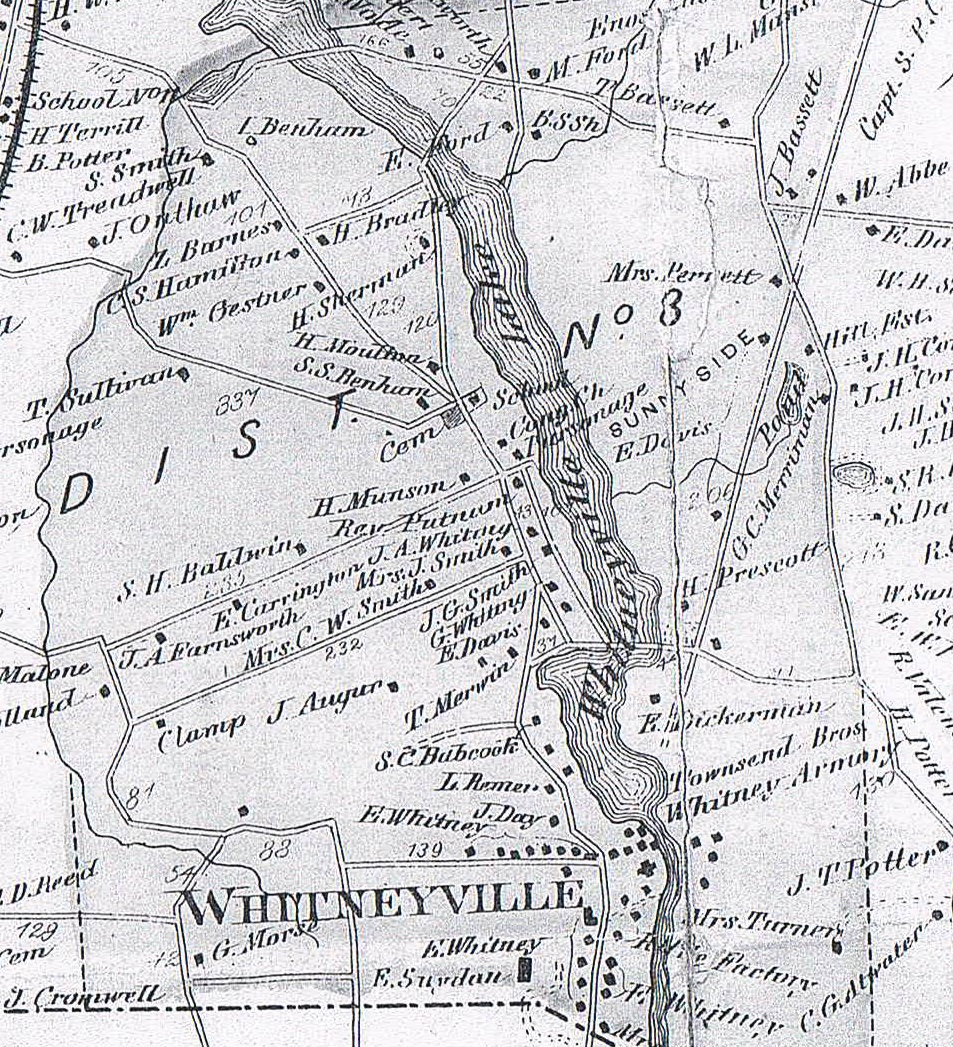
As shown in this map from 1868, Whitneyville originally centered at Whitney's armory. It later shifted to the Congregational Church near the center of the map.

In 1860 Whitney's son, Eli Whitney Jr., completely rebuilt the factory and increased the height of the mill dam. This provided more water power and created Lake Whitney, the first municipal water supply for New Haven. He was also a financial supporter of Whitneyville Congregational Church, almost a mile north of the factory, and the neighborhood center began to shift there. By 1900 the electric trolley line from New Haven reached Whitneyville, leading to the subdivision of surrounding land for residential development. The neighborhood street network was substantially complete by 1927. Houses continued to be built well into the twentieth century, notably several distinctive modern homes on Deepwood Drive, and the last house in which playwright Thornton Wilder lived.

=== Historic sites ===
These locations in the neighborhood are listed on the National Register of Historic Places:

- Edgerton Park
- Farmington Canal (part)
- Pistol Factory Dwelling
- Eli Whitney Gun Factory
- Whitneyville Congregational Church

== Government ==
The Town of Hamden provides all municipal services for the neighborhood. It is located in Connecticut's 3rd congressional district. Most of the neighborhood is in the 11th state senate district, with a small western portion in the 17th, and most of it is in the 91st state house district, with a small western portion in the 94th. It is in the 5th district of the town legislative council. It is served by the Whitneyville post office with ZIP code 06517.

== Transportation ==
Whitney Avenue extends north and south through the neighborhood with Putnam Avenue extending to the west from Whitney Avenue to Dixwell Avenue. The nearest expressway interchanges are on the Wilbur Cross Parkway (Route 15) in Hamden or I-91 in New Haven.

CT Transit operates the 228 and 229 bus routes on Whitney Avenue and the 234 route on Putnam Avenue and several other neighborhood streets.

Farmington Canal Greenway, a segment of East Coast Greenway, extends along the western edge of Whitneyville with an entrance on Putnam Avenue.

== Education ==
Educational facilities in the neighborhood include Hamden Hall Country Day School, a private, coeducational school for prekindergarten to grade 12, and the Children's Center of Hamden, a residential facility for children and teenagers with learning disabilities and other challenges. The central offices of the Hamden public schools are located in the former Putnam Avenue School building.

A small portion of the campus of Albertus Magnus College in New Haven extends into the neighborhood.

== Recreation ==
There are two town parks in the neighborhood. DeNicola Park has a playground, multisport field, and basketball courts. Villano Park has a playground, splash pad, multisport field, and basketball and tennis courts. The adjoining Rochford Field has baseball and softball fields used by Albertus Magnus.
