= Whitneyville Congregational Church (Hamden, Connecticut) =

Historic church in Connecticut, United States

- U.S. National Register of Historic Places
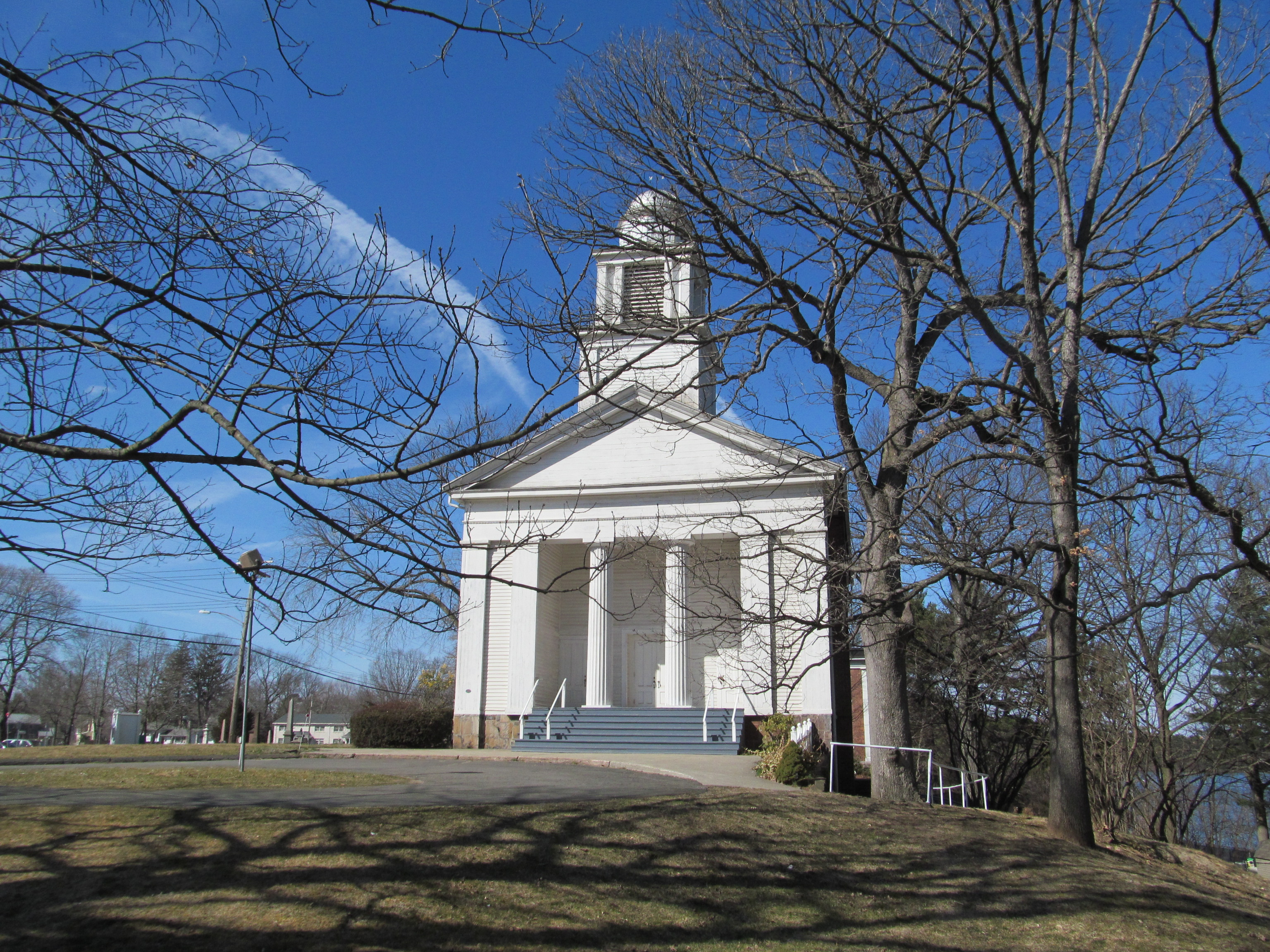
- Whitneyville Congregational Church

- Location within Connecticut Location within the United States
- Location: 1247-1253 Whitney Avenue, Hamden, Connecticut
- Coordinates: 41°20′48″N 72°54′44″W
- Area: 1.7 acres (0.69 ha)
- Built: 1834
- Architect: Rufus G. Russell (1866 interior)
- Architectural style: Greek Revival
- NRHP reference No.: 95000906
- Added to NRHP: July 28, 1995

The Whitneyville Congregational Church, now the Whitneyville United Church of Christ, is a historic Congregational Church at 1247-1253 Whitney Avenue in the Whitneyville section of Hamden, Connecticut, United States. The congregation is now affiliated with the United Church of Christ (UCC). The church building is a Greek Revival style built in 1834, with an interior altered in 1866 to designs by Rufus G. Russell. The church, along with its 1924 parish house, was added to the National Register of Historic Places in 1995 for its architecture.

== Architecture and history ==
The Whitneyville Congregational Church stands in the Whitneyville village of southeastern Hamden, on the east side of Whitney Avenue just east of Ralston Avenue. It is a single-story frame structure, covered by a gabled roof and finished mainly in clapboards. The front facade resembles a Greek temple front, with square pilastered corners, entrances recessed behind fluted Doric columns, and a gable pediment whose tympanum is flushboarded. The corners of the entrance recess are also pilastered, giving the appearance of square columns set in antes. The interior has a small vestibule area at the rear, and is otherwise a single large sanctuary chamber, with a gallery level supported by columns with Corinthian capitals. Just north of the church is its 1924 parish house, a Colonial Revival two-story brick building housing offices, classrooms, and a small auditorium.

The church congregation was established in 1795, and built its first sanctuary in the Hamden Plains area. By 1833 the first church was too small, and the search began for land to build a larger structure. A gift of land from the Whitney family convinced the congregation to relocate to Whitneyville, then a community undergoing rapid growth due to the nearby Eli Whitney Gun Factory. The church was completed in 1834; its designer is not known. The interior underwent a Victorian restyling in 1866 under the auspices of Rufus G. Russell, a New Haven architect and protegé of Henry Austin.

== See also ==
- National Register of Historic Places listings in New Haven County, Connecticut
