= Pistol Factory Dwelling =

Historic house in Connecticut, United States

- U.S. National Register of Historic Places
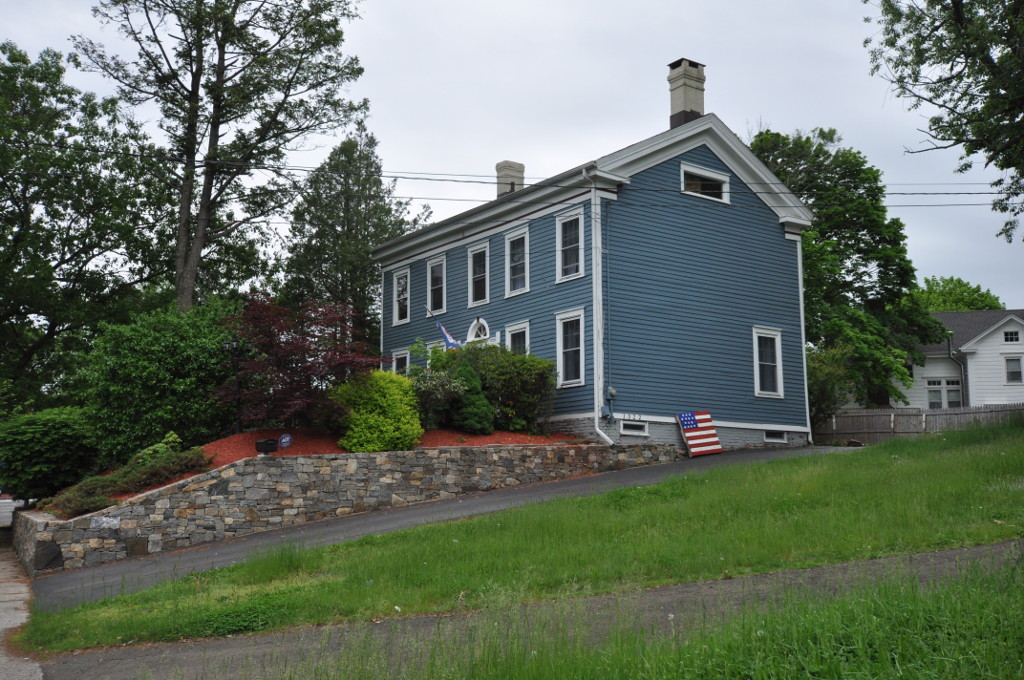

- Location within Connecticut Location within the United States
- Location: 1322 Whitney Avenue, Hamden, Connecticut
- Coordinates: 41°20′57″N 72°54′51″W
- Area: less than one acre
- Built: 1845
- Architectural style: Greek Revival, Vernacular Greek Revival
- NRHP reference No.: 91001846
- Added to NRHP: December 27, 1991

The Pistol Factory Dwelling is a historic house at 1322 Whitney Avenue in Hamden, Connecticut. Built in 1845 and enlarged before 1860, it is an unusual example of a Greek Revival worker's boarding house, built by Eli Whitney II (son and business success to inventor Eli Whitney) to house workers at his nearby pistol factory. The house was listed on the National Register of Historic Places in 1991.

== Description and history ==
The Pistol Factory Dwelling is located in eastern Hamden, set on a knoll above Whitney Avenue just north of its junction with Mather Street. It is a 2 1/2-story wood-frame structure, with a side-gable roof, two asymmetrically placed brick chimneys, and a clapboarded exterior. The main facade is five bays wide, with windows in a slightly asymmetrical placement around the main entrance. The entrance is flanked by fluted boards that resemble pilasters, sidelight windows, and another set of fluted boards, and is topped by a half-round transom window. The side gable ends have narrow horizontal windows in them, and there is a small shed-roof ell extending to the rear.

The house was built in 1845 by Eli Whitney II to house skilled workers at a pistol factory he had established nearby (on a site now flooded by Lake Whitney). The house was built as a single-pile three-bay structure, with a single-story ell to the side, which was later (before 1860) raised to match the main block in height. The house was eventually sold to one of its tenants, and was moved in 1940 to accommodate road work (but retaining its orientation to the roadway). It is the only structure that survives that is related to the pistol factory, whose site was flooded in 1861 by Whitney in a bid to improve water power for a combined arms factory further downstream.

== See also ==
- National Register of Historic Places listings in New Haven County, Connecticut
