= Imperial Granum-Joseph Parker Buildings =

- U.S. National Register of Historic Places
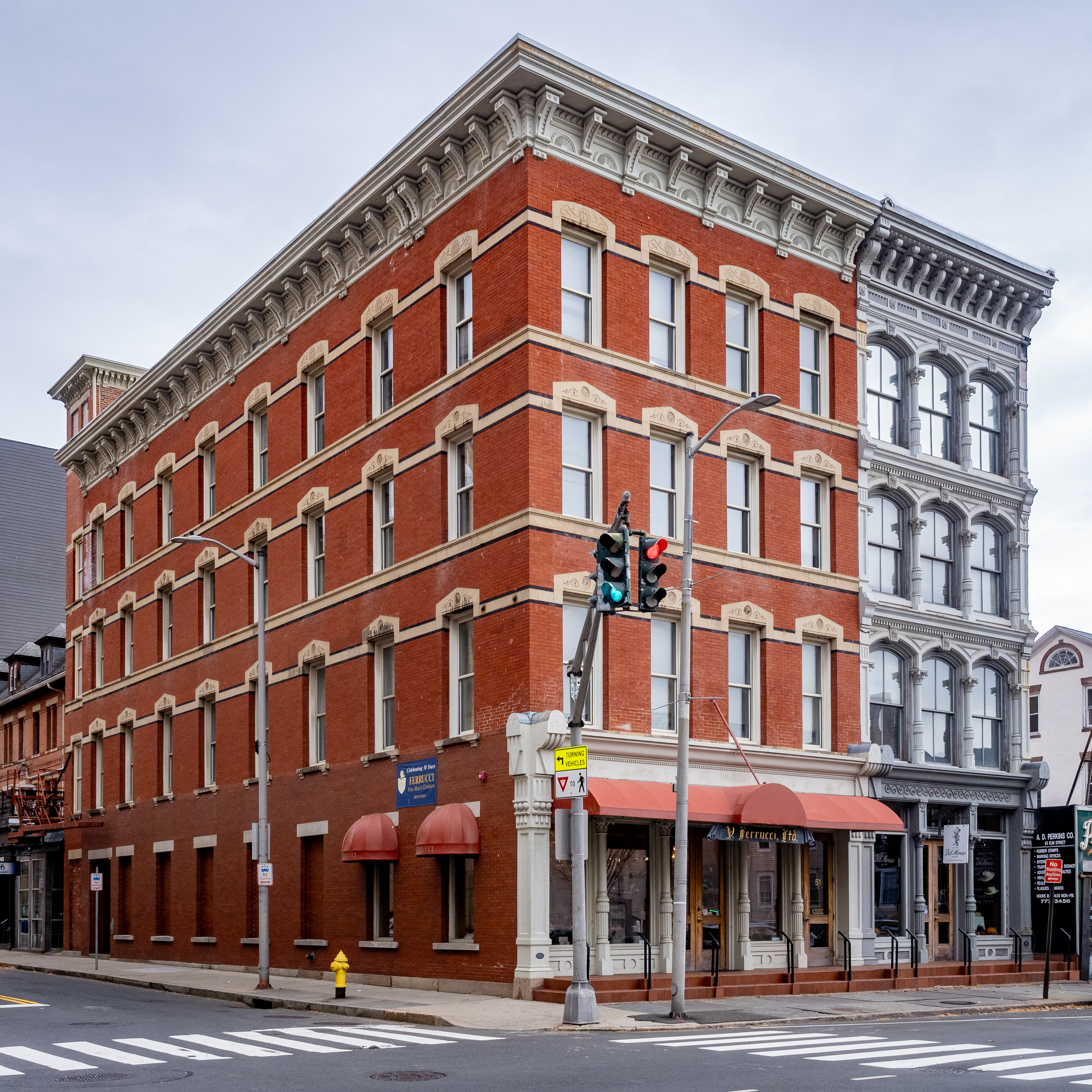
- (2024)

- Location within Connecticut Location within the United States
- Location: 47 and 49-51 Elm Street, New Haven, Connecticut
- Coordinates: 41°18′27″N 72°55′23″W
- Area: less than one acre
- Built: 1875; 1877
- Architect: David R. Brown; Rufus G. Russell
- Architectural style: Late Victorian Gothic, Renaissance
- NRHP reference No.: 86000409
- Added to NRHP: March 6, 1986

The Imperial Granum-Joseph Parker Buildings, also known historically as the Del Monico Building, are a pair of conjoined historic commercial buildings at Elm and Orange Streets in downtown New Haven, Connecticut. Built in 1875 and 1877, the two buildings are among the finest examples of the architecture of that period in the city, with one sporting one of the city's only surviving cast iron facades. The buildings were listed on the National Register of Historic Places in 1986.

== Description and history ==
The Imperial Granum-Joseph Parker Buildings are located one block east of the New Haven Green in downtown New Haven, on the east side of the corner of Elm and Orange Streets. Both buildings are four stories in height, and of masonry construction, with heavily bracketed projecting cornices at the roof line. The Parker Building, which stands at the corner, is built out of red brick. Its ground floor facade is a modern stylistic copy of the Imperial Granum Building, with paneled pilasters at the outer ends, and engaged round columns separating the window and door bays. It has one storefront, with three display windows and a double-door entrance. The main building entrance, which now serves both buildings is located to its right. The upper-level windows are set in rectangular openings with peaked stone lintels. The Orange Street facade has similar upper-floor windows, with mostly blinded window bays and a secondary entrance on the ground floor. The Imperial Granum building is slightly narrower, sharing a full party wall with the Parker Building. It is three bays wide, with a single storefront on the ground floor. The upper-level windows have more elaborate surrounds, with engaged columns between windows set in segmented-arch openings, pilasters at the ends, and shallow dentillated cornices between the floors.

The Parker Building was built in 1875, and the Imperial Granum in 1877. Both have been attributed to architects working in the office of Henry Austin: the Parker by David R. Brown, and the Imperial Granum by Rufus G. Russell. The latter is noted as having the city's only surviving ground-floor cast iron facade, a feature that was never popular in the city and existed only in small numbers. The Parker Building was built for a paper manufacturer, who used the upper floors as a warehouse. The Imperial Granum gets its name from a patent medicine marketed by its owner, Edward Heaton, and for many years sported an advertisement of that product on its exposed southeastern wall. The buildings came under one owner in 1945, and were joined in their upper floors by breaking through the party wall, and also building a shared, interior staircase. A hatshop named Del Monico's occupies the ground floor.

== See also ==
- National Register of Historic Places listings in New Haven, Connecticut
