= Rufus G. Russell =

American architect

Rufus Gustavus Russell
- Born: September 5, 1823; Prospect, Connecticut
- Died: August 3, 1896 (aged 72); New Haven, Connecticut
- Occupation: Architect

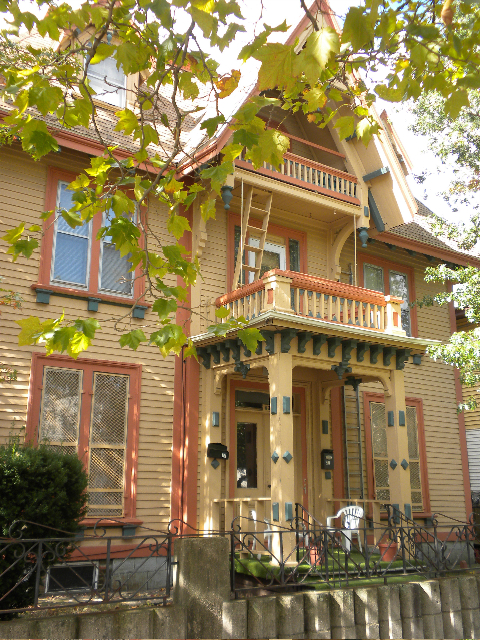
House for Nicholas Countryman, New Haven, Connecticut, 1866-67.

Rufus G. Russell (1823-1896) was an architect working from New Haven, Connecticut.

== Life and career ==
Rufus Gustavus Russell was born September 5, 1823, in what is now Prospect, Connecticut. As a young man he moved to New Haven, where he worked for many years for Henry Austin, the city's leading architect. In 1862, Russell left Austin and established his own practice. Russell was an independent practitioner until his death in 1896.

== Personal life ==
Russell was elected to the Board of Aldermen of New Haven on two occasions and was at times also a member of the Common Council. He was active in temperance work and was a member of the Sons of Temperance.

Russell was married and had two children who lived to adulthood. He died August 3, 1896, in New Haven.

== Legacy ==
Russell had an extensive practice. He "designed numerous buildings in New Haven: the Calvary Baptist Church (1871) on Chapel Street, the New Haven Gas Company (1872) on Crown Street, and the Humphrey School (1877) on Humphrey Street. In 1866 he designed the residence of Nicholas Countryman, one of New Haven's leading builders." He would become "one of the best-known architects in New Haven".

He designed the David Lyman II House in 1863, a house which has been regarded as "one of the finest examples of the Gothic Revival style in the greater Middletown area."

At least two buildings designed by Russell have been individually listed on the United States National Register of Historic Places, and others contribute to listed historic districts.

== Architectural works ==
- House for David Lyman II, Middlefield, Connecticut (1863–64, NRHP-listed 1986)
- House for Nicholas Countryman, (Note: A contributing property to the Howard Avenue Historic District.) New Haven, Connecticut (1866–67)
- Remodeling of the Whitneyville Congregational Church, Hamden, Connecticut (1866, NRHP-listed 1995)
- Howard Avenue Congregational Church, New Haven, Connecticut (1867, demolished)
- First Congregational Church, Wallingford, Connecticut (1868)
- Universalist Church of North Salem (former), North Salem, New York (1869–70)
- Calvary Baptist Church, (Note: Presently the Yale Repertory Theatre.) New Haven, Connecticut (1871)
- Davenport Congregational Church, (Note: Later the St. Casimir (Polish) R. C. Church, now condominiums.) New Haven, Connecticut (1872)
- New Haven Gas Light Company Building, New Haven, Connecticut (1872, demolished)
- Extensions of the New Haven Hospital, (Note: Designed in association with Frederick Clarke Withers of New York, New York.) New Haven, Connecticut (1872–73, demolished)
- City Court Building, New Haven, Connecticut (1873, demolished)
- West Divinity Hall, Yale Divinity School, New Haven, Connecticut (1874, demolished)
- Edwards Street School (former), New Haven, Connecticut (1876)
- All Souls Unitarian Church, Washington, District of Columbia (1877, demolished)
- Humphrey Street School (former), New Haven, Connecticut (1877)
- Imperial Granum Building, New Haven, Connecticut (1877, NRHP-listed 1986)
- Institute Library, New Haven, Connecticut (1877)
- Universalist Church of Our Father, Buffalo, New York (1879–80, demolished)
- Garfield Memorial Church (former), Washington, District of Columbia (1881–83)
- Winchester Observatory (former), Yale University, New Haven, Connecticut (1882)
- Warner Hall, New Haven, Connecticut (1892)

Private residences designed by Rufus G. Russell can be found in the Howard Avenue Historic District and the Prospect Hill Historic District of New Haven.

== Gallery of architectural works ==
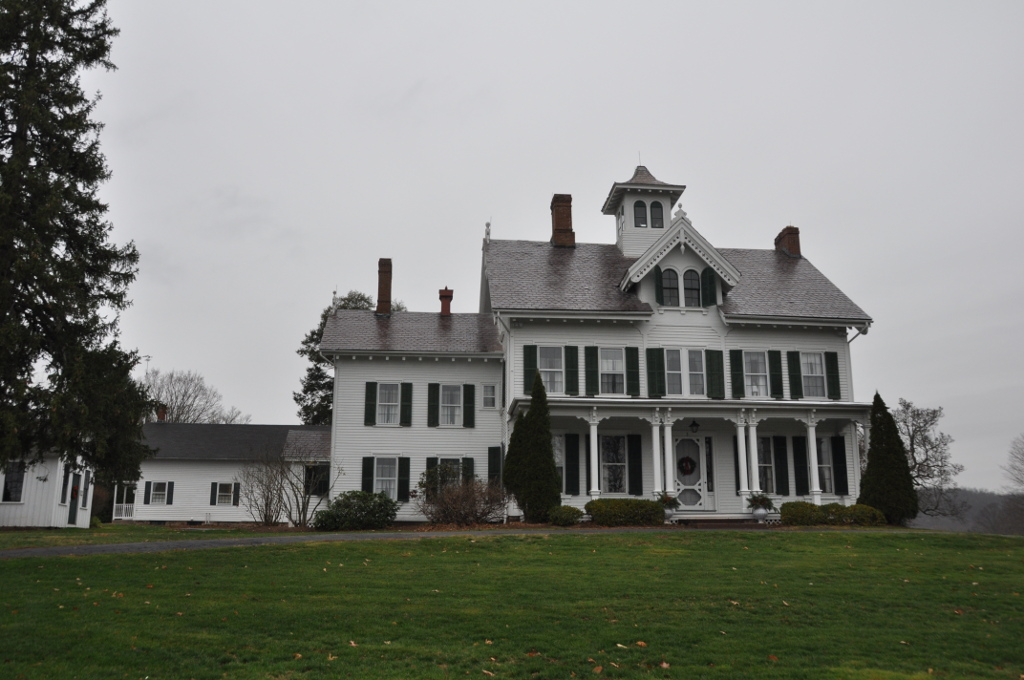
House for David Lyman II, Middlefield, Connecticut, 1863-64.

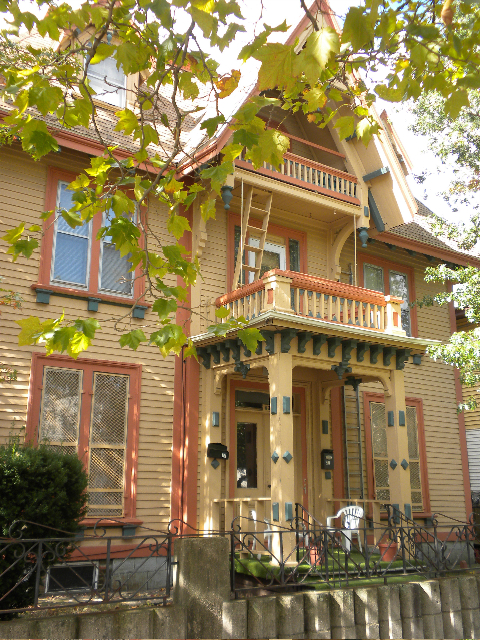
House for Nicholas Countryman, New Haven, Connecticut, 1866-67.

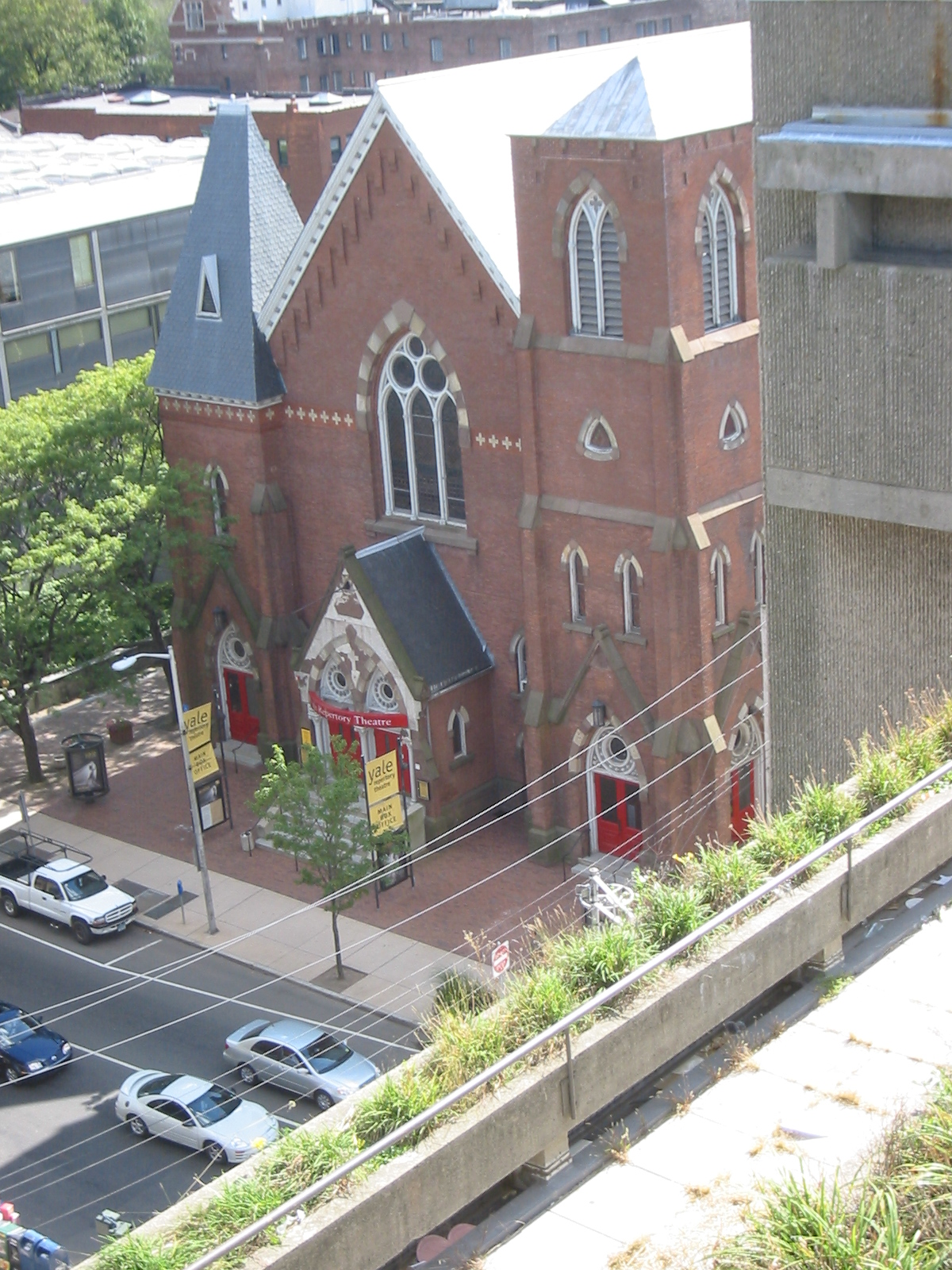
Calvary Baptist Church, New Haven, Connecticut, 1871.

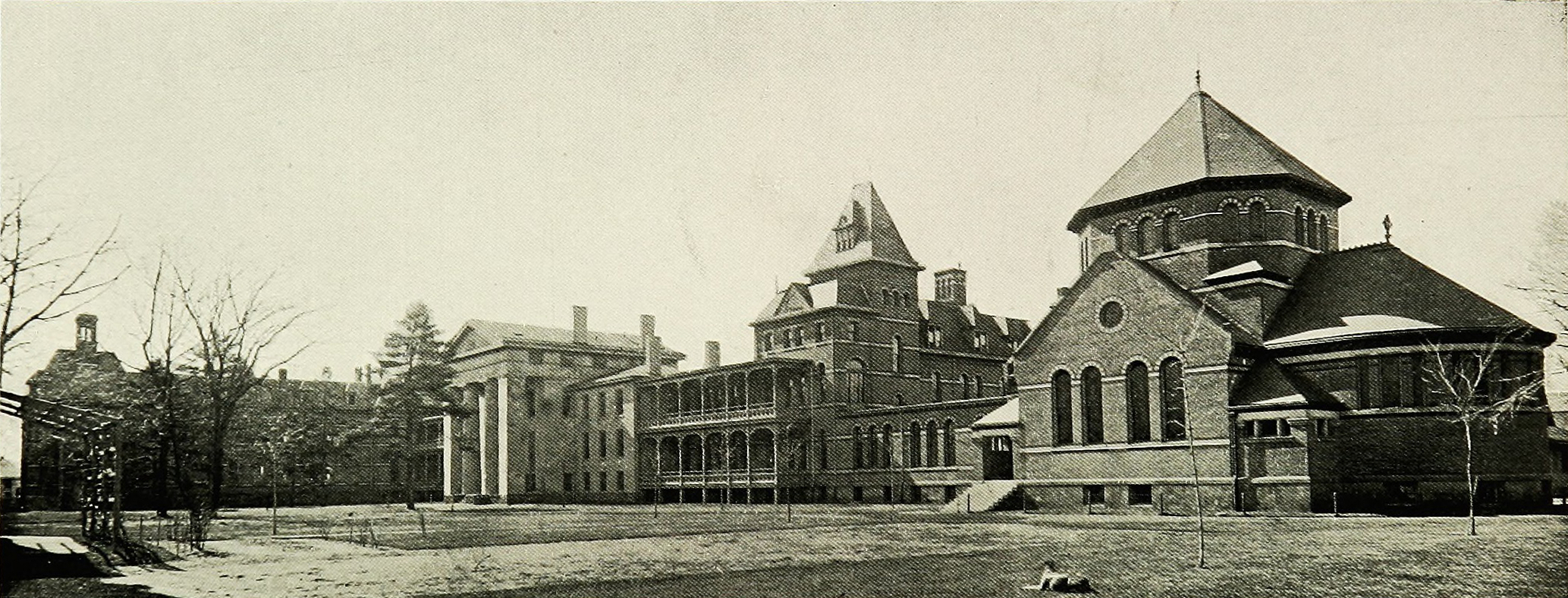
Extensions of the New Haven Hospital, New Haven, Connecticut, 1872-73.

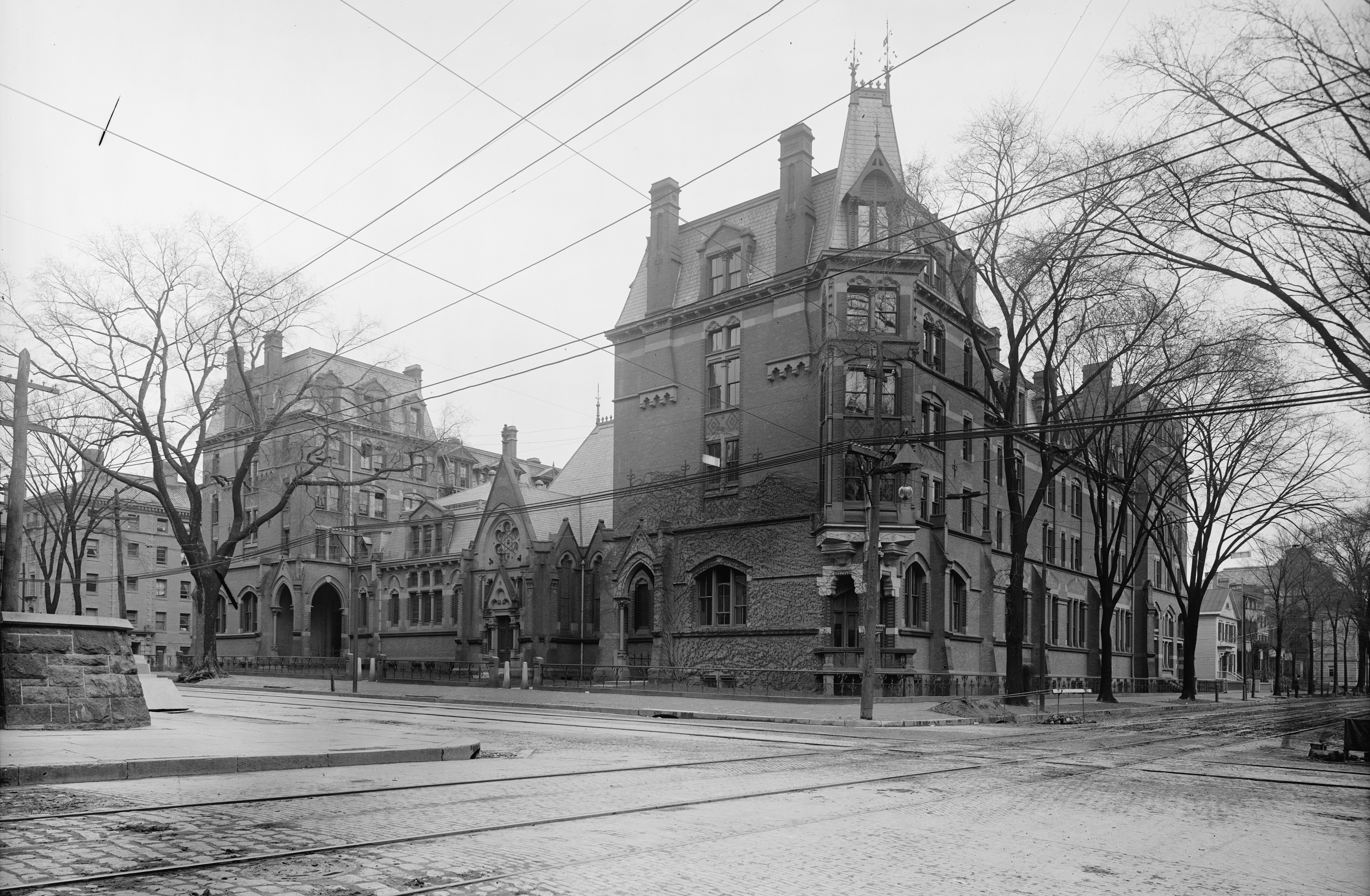
West Divinity Hall (left), Yale Divinity School, New Haven, Connecticut, 1874.

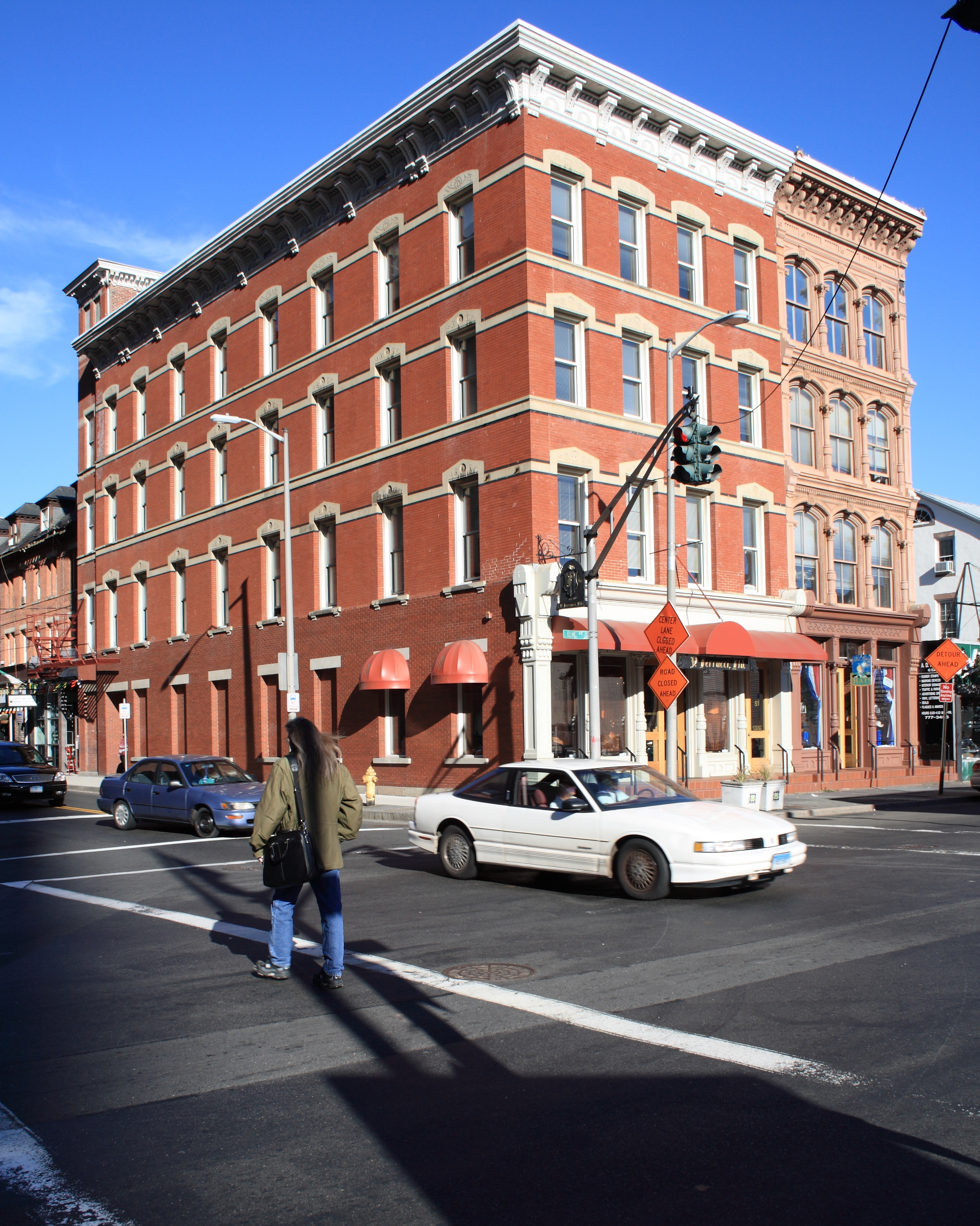
Imperial Granum Building (right), New Haven, Connecticut, 1877.

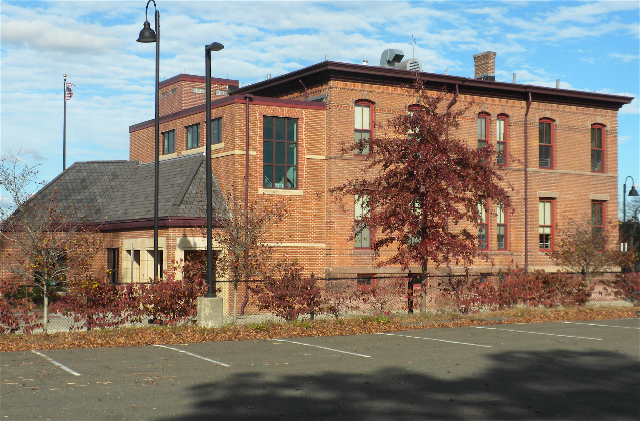
Winchester Observatory (former), Yale University, New Haven, Connecticut, 1882.

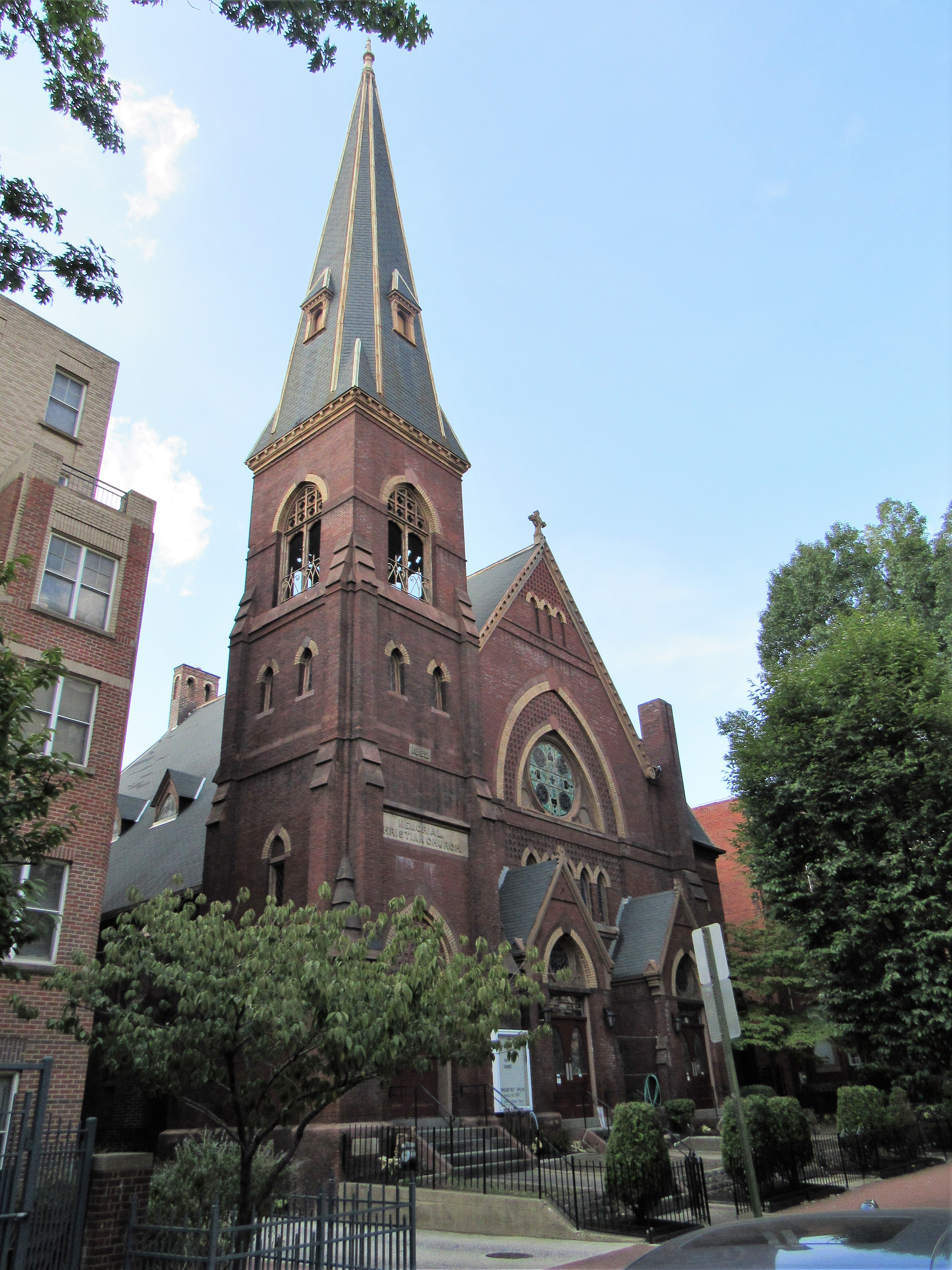
Garfield Memorial Church (former), Washington, District of Columbia, 1881-83.

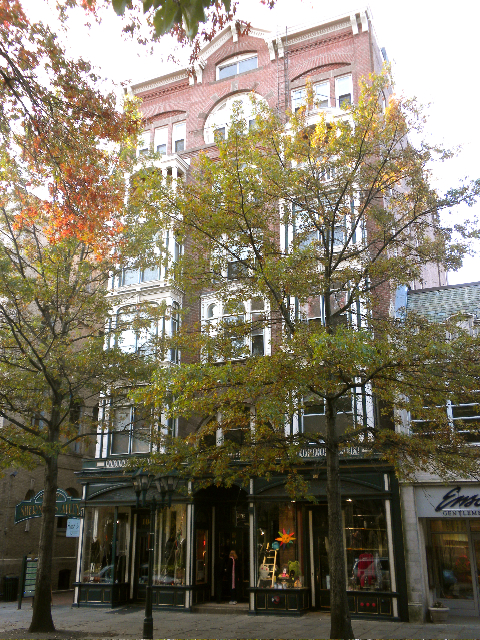
Warner Hall, New Haven, Connecticut, 1892.
