= David Lyman II House =

Historic house in Connecticut, United States

- U.S. National Register of Historic Places
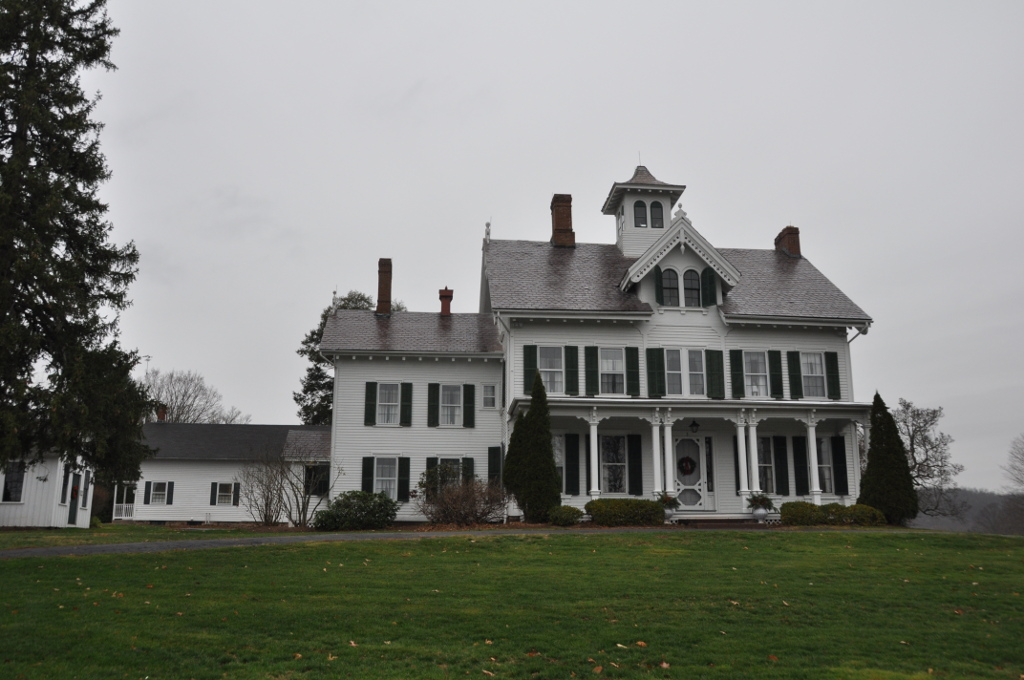

- Location within Connecticut Location within the United States
- Location: 5 Lyman Road, Middlefield, Connecticut
- Coordinates: 41°29′47″N 72°42′43″W
- Area: 2 acres (0.81 ha)
- Built: 1859-1864
- Architect: Rufus G. Russell
- Architectural style: Gothic Revival
- NRHP reference No.: 86000149
- Added to NRHP: February 6, 1986

The David Lyman II House, also known as the Lyman Homestead, is a historic house at 5 Lyman Road in Middlefield, Connecticut. Built around 1860, it is among the best Gothic Revival structures in the greater Middletown area. The house is built in part on the foundation of a 1785 house that originally stood on the site. The 2-acre (0.81 ha) property containing the house and its outbuildings was listed on the National Register of Historic Places in 1986.

== Description and history ==
The David Lyman II House stands in a rural setting of Middlefield, on the west side of Lyman Road just south of its junction with Connecticut Route 147. It is a 2 1/2-story wood-frame structure, with a gabled roof and clapboarded exterior. The roof is crowned by a square cupola with paired round-arch windows on each side, and a flared pyramidal roof. A gabled wall dormer rises in front of the cupola, adorned with vergeboard and crowned by a finial. The main facade is five bays wide, with a single-story porch extending across the front. The porch is supported by chamfered post with sawn brackets. Italianate brackets also adorn all of the roof eaves.

The Lyman family owned land in this area for more than 200 years. David Lyman II operated a 500 acres (200 ha) farm, and was a local industrialist, founding (among other businesses) the Airline Railroad. The house was built to a design by New Haven architect Rufus G. Russell and was completed by 1865. Its main block was apparently built on the foundation of an older house, which was built on the site in 1785.

== See also ==
- National Register of Historic Places listings in Middlesex County, Connecticut
