= Eli Whitney =

American inventor (1765–1825)

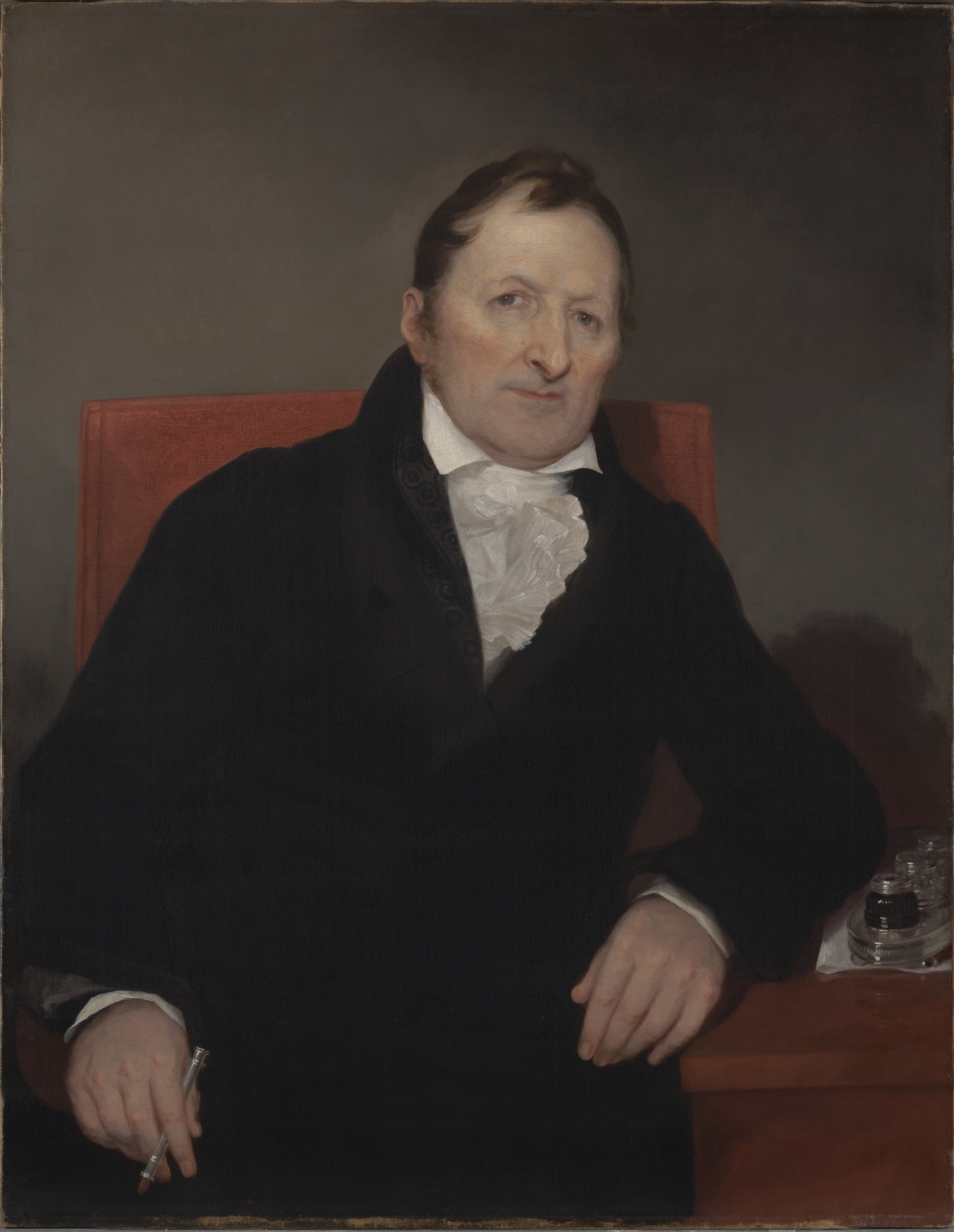
- 1822 portrait of Whitney by Samuel Morse
- Born: Eli Whitney Jr. December 8, 1765; Westborough, Province of Massachusetts Bay, British America
- Died: January 8, 1825 (aged 59); New Haven, Connecticut, U.S.
- Education: Yale College
- Spouse: Henrietta Frances Edwards (m. 1817)
- Children: 4
- Relatives: Whitney family
- Engineering career
- Projects: Interchangeable parts; cotton gin

Eli Whitney Jr. (December 8, 1765 – January 8, 1825) was an American inventor, widely known for inventing the cotton gin in 1793, one of the key inventions of the Industrial Revolution that shaped the economy of the Antebellum South. Whitney's invention made upland short cotton into a profitable crop, which strengthened the economic foundation of slavery in the United States and prolonged the institution. Despite the social and economic impact of his invention, Whitney lost much of his profits in legal battles over patent infringement for the cotton gin. Thereafter, he turned his attention to securing contracts with the government in the manufacture of muskets for the newly formed United States Army. He continued making arms and inventing until his death in 1825.

== Early life and education ==
Whitney was born in Westborough, Massachusetts, on December 8, 1765, the eldest child of Eli Whitney Sr., a prosperous farmer, and his wife Elizabeth Fay, also of Westborough.

The younger Eli was famous during his lifetime and after his death by the name "Eli Whitney", though he was technically Eli Whitney Jr. His son, born in 1820, also named Eli, was known during his lifetime and afterward by the name "Eli Whitney Jr."

Whitney's mother, Elizabeth Fay, died in 1777, when he was 11. At age 14 he operated a profitable nail manufacturing operation in his father's workshop during the Revolutionary War.

Because his stepmother opposed his wish to attend college, Whitney worked as a farm laborer and school teacher to save money. He prepared for Yale at Leicester Academy (later Becker College) and under the tutelage of Rev. Elizur Goodrich of Durham, Connecticut, he entered Yale in the fall of 1789 and graduated Phi Beta Kappa in 1792. Whitney expected to study law but, finding himself short of funds, accepted an offer to go to South Carolina as a private tutor.

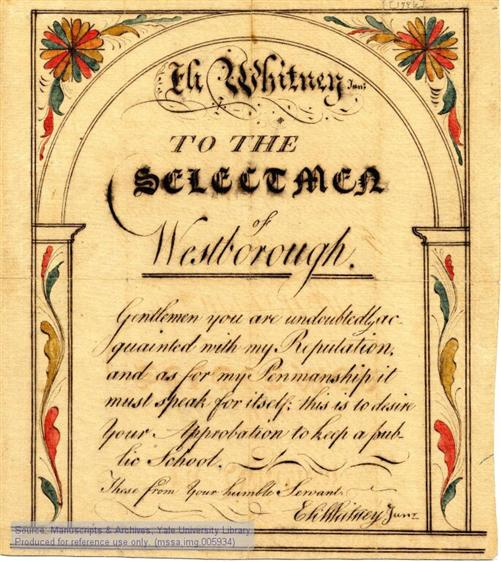
Petition by Whitney to the selectmen of Westborough, Massachusetts, to run a public school, with sample of his penmanship

Instead of reaching his destination, he was convinced to visit Georgia. In the closing years of the 18th century, Georgia was a magnet for New Englanders seeking their fortunes (its Revolutionary-era governor had been Lyman Hall, a migrant from Connecticut). When he initially sailed for South Carolina, among his shipmates were the widow (Catherine Littlefield Greene) and family of the Revolutionary hero Gen. Nathanael Greene of Rhode Island. Mrs. Greene invited Whitney to visit her Georgia plantation, Mulberry Grove. Her plantation manager and husband-to-be was Phineas Miller, another Connecticut migrant and Yale graduate (class of 1785), who would become Whitney's business partner.

== Career ==
Whitney is most famous for two innovations which came to have significant impacts on the United States in the mid-19th century: the cotton gin (1793) and his advocacy of interchangeable parts. In the South, the cotton gin revolutionized the way cotton was harvested and reinvigorated slavery. Conversely, in the North the adoption of interchangeable parts revolutionized the manufacturing industry, contributing greatly to the Union's victory in the Civil War.

=== Cotton gin ===
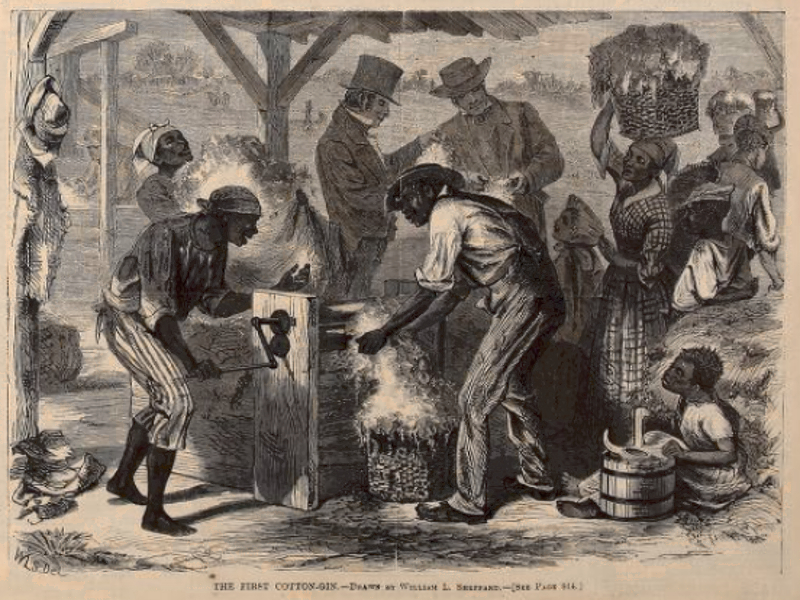
"First cotton gin" from Harpers Weekly. 1869 illustration depicting event of some 70 years earlier.

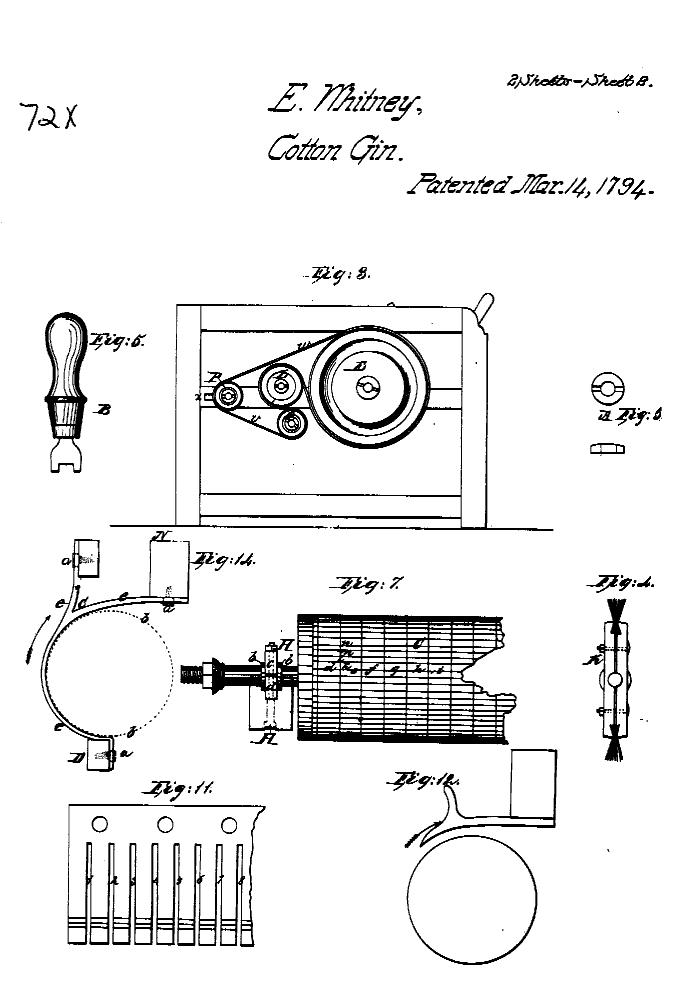
Cotton Gin Patent. It shows sawtooth gin blades, which were not part of Whitney's original patent.

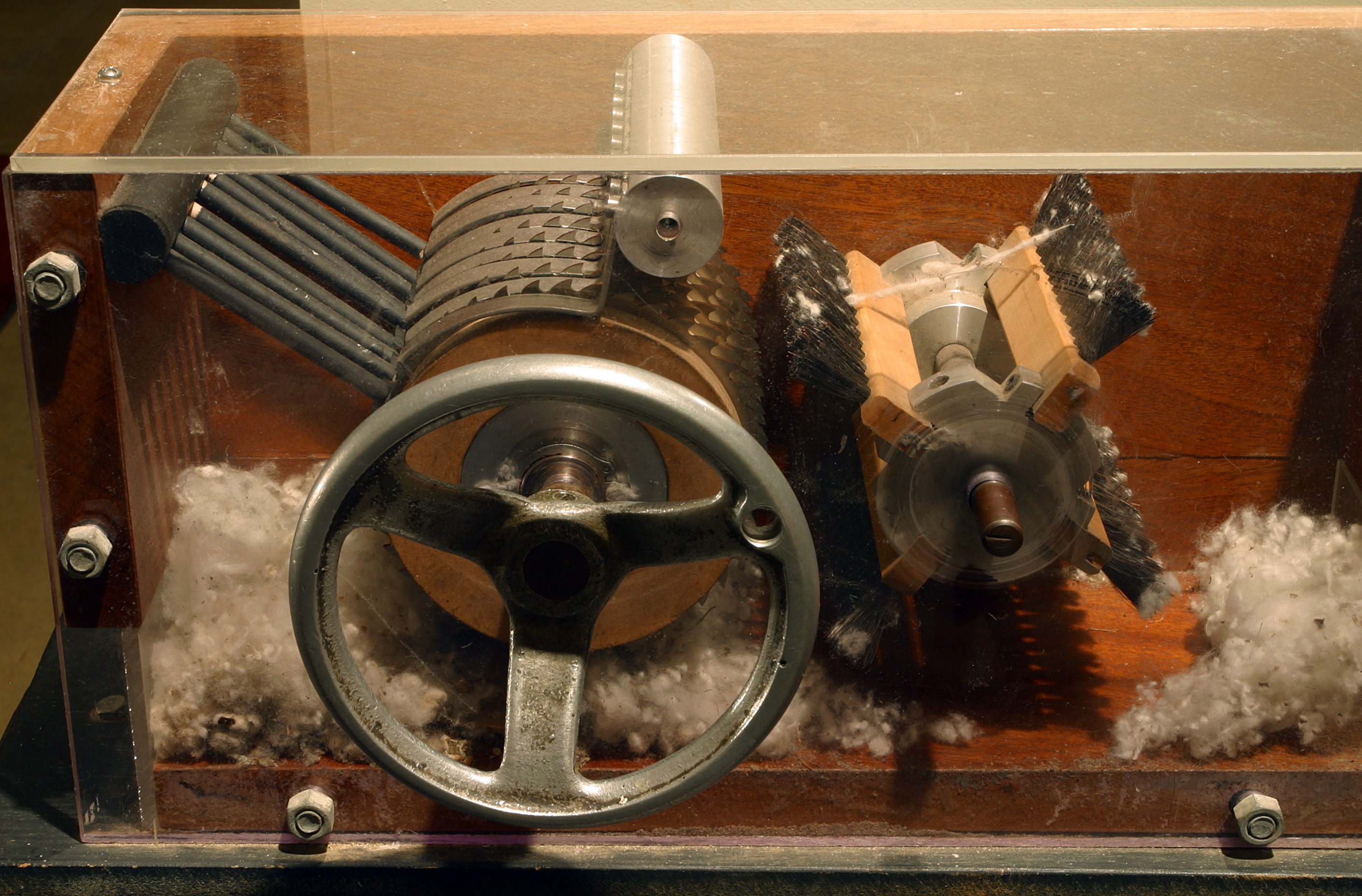
A cotton gin on display at the Eli Whitney Museum

The cotton gin is a mechanical device that removes the seeds from cotton, a process that had previously been extremely labor-intensive. The word gin is short for engine. While staying at Mulberry Grove, Whitney constructed several ingenious household devices which led Mrs Greene to introduce him to some businessmen who were discussing the desirability of a machine to separate the short staple upland cotton from its seeds, work that was then done by hand at the rate of a pound of lint a day. In a few weeks Whitney produced a model. The cotton gin was a wooden drum stuck with hooks that pulled the cotton fibers through a mesh. The cotton seeds would not fit through the mesh and fell outside. Whitney occasionally told a story wherein he was pondering an improved method of seeding the cotton when he was inspired by observing a cat attempting to pull a chicken through a fence, and able to only pull through some of the feathers.

A single cotton gin could generate up to 55 pounds (25 kg) of cleaned cotton daily. This contributed to the economic development of the Southern United States, a prime cotton growing area; some historians believe that this invention allowed for slavery in the United States, in particular in the South, to become more sustainable at a critical point in its development.

Whitney applied for the patent for his cotton gin on October 28, 1793, and received the patent (later numbered as X72) on March 14, 1794, but it was not validated until 1807. Whitney and his partner, Miller, did not intend to sell the gins. Rather, like the proprietors of gristmills and sawmills, they expected to charge farmers for cleaning their cotton – two-fifths of the value, paid in cotton. Resentment at this scheme, the mechanical simplicity of the device and the primitive state of patent law, made infringement inevitable. Whitney and Miller could not build enough gins to meet demand, so gins from other makers found ready sale. Ultimately, patent infringement lawsuits consumed the profits (one patent, later annulled, was granted in 1796 to Hogden Holmes for a gin which substituted circular saws for the spikes) and their cotton gin company went out of business in 1797. One oft-overlooked point is that there were drawbacks to Whitney's first design. There are claims that the use of wires rather than pegs was proposed by Mrs. Greene, but these are disputed.

After validation of the patent, the legislature of South Carolina voted $50,000 for the rights for that state, while North Carolina levied a license tax for five years, from which about $30,000 was realized. There is a claim that Tennessee paid about $10,000.

While the cotton gin did not earn Whitney the fortune he had hoped for, it did give him fame. It has been argued by some historians that Whitney's cotton gin was an important if unintended cause of the American Civil War. After Whitney's invention, the Southern plantation economy was rejuvenated, eventually culminating in the Civil War.

The cotton gin transformed Southern agriculture and the national economy. Southern cotton found ready markets in Europe and in the burgeoning textile mills of New England. Cotton exports from the U.S. boomed after the cotton gin's appearance – from less than 500,000 pounds (230,000 kg) in 1793 to 93 million pounds (42,000,000 kg) by 1810. Cotton was a staple that could be stored for long periods and shipped long distances, unlike most agricultural products. It became the U.S.'s chief export, representing over half the value of U.S. exports from 1820 to 1860.

Before the 1790s, slave labor was primarily employed in growing rice, tobacco, and indigo, none of which were especially profitable anymore. Neither was cotton, due to the difficulty of seed removal. But with the invention of the gin, growing cotton with slave labor became highly profitable – the chief source of wealth in the American South, and the basis of frontier settlement from Georgia to Texas. "King Cotton" became a dominant economic force, and slavery was sustained as a key institution of Southern society.

=== Interchangeable parts ===
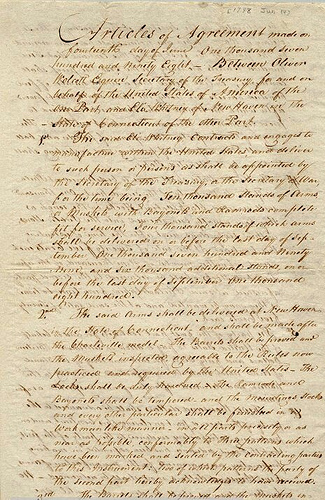
First contract of Eli Whitney as a firearms manufacturer, 1798. Signed by Oliver Wolcott Jr., Secretary of the Treasury.

Eli Whitney has often been incorrectly credited with inventing the idea of interchangeable parts, which he championed for years as a maker of muskets; however, the idea predated Whitney, and Whitney's role in it was one of promotion and popularizing, not invention. Successful implementation of the idea eluded Whitney until near the end of his life, occurring first in others' armories.

Attempts at interchangeability of parts can be traced back as far as the Punic Wars through both archaeological remains of boats now in Museo Archeologico Baglio Anselmi and contemporary written accounts. In modern times the idea developed over decades among many people. An early leader was Jean-Baptiste Vaquette de Gribeauval, an 18th-century French artillerist who created a fair amount of standardization of artillery pieces, although not true interchangeability of parts. He inspired others, including Honoré Blanc and Louis de Tousard, to work further on the idea, and on shoulder weapons as well as artillery. In the 19th century these efforts produced the "armory system," or American system of manufacturing. Certain other New Englanders, including Captain John H. Hall and Simeon North, arrived at successful interchangeability before Whitney's armory did. The Whitney armory finally succeeded not long after his death in 1825.

The motives behind Whitney's acceptance of a contract to manufacture muskets in 1798 were mostly monetary. By the late 1790s, Whitney was on the verge of bankruptcy and the cotton gin litigation had left him deeply in debt. His New Haven cotton gin factory had burned to the ground, and litigation sapped his remaining resources. The French Revolutionary Wars had led the American government to embark on a process of remilitarization, and the War Department issued contracts for the manufacture of 10,000 muskets. Whitney, who had never made a gun in his life, obtained a contract in January 1798 to deliver between 10,000 to 15,000 muskets in 1800. He had not mentioned interchangeable parts at that time. Ten months later, the Treasury Secretary, Oliver Wolcott Jr., sent him a "foreign pamphlet on arms manufacturing techniques," possibly one of Honoré Blanc's reports, after which Whitney first began to talk about interchangeability.

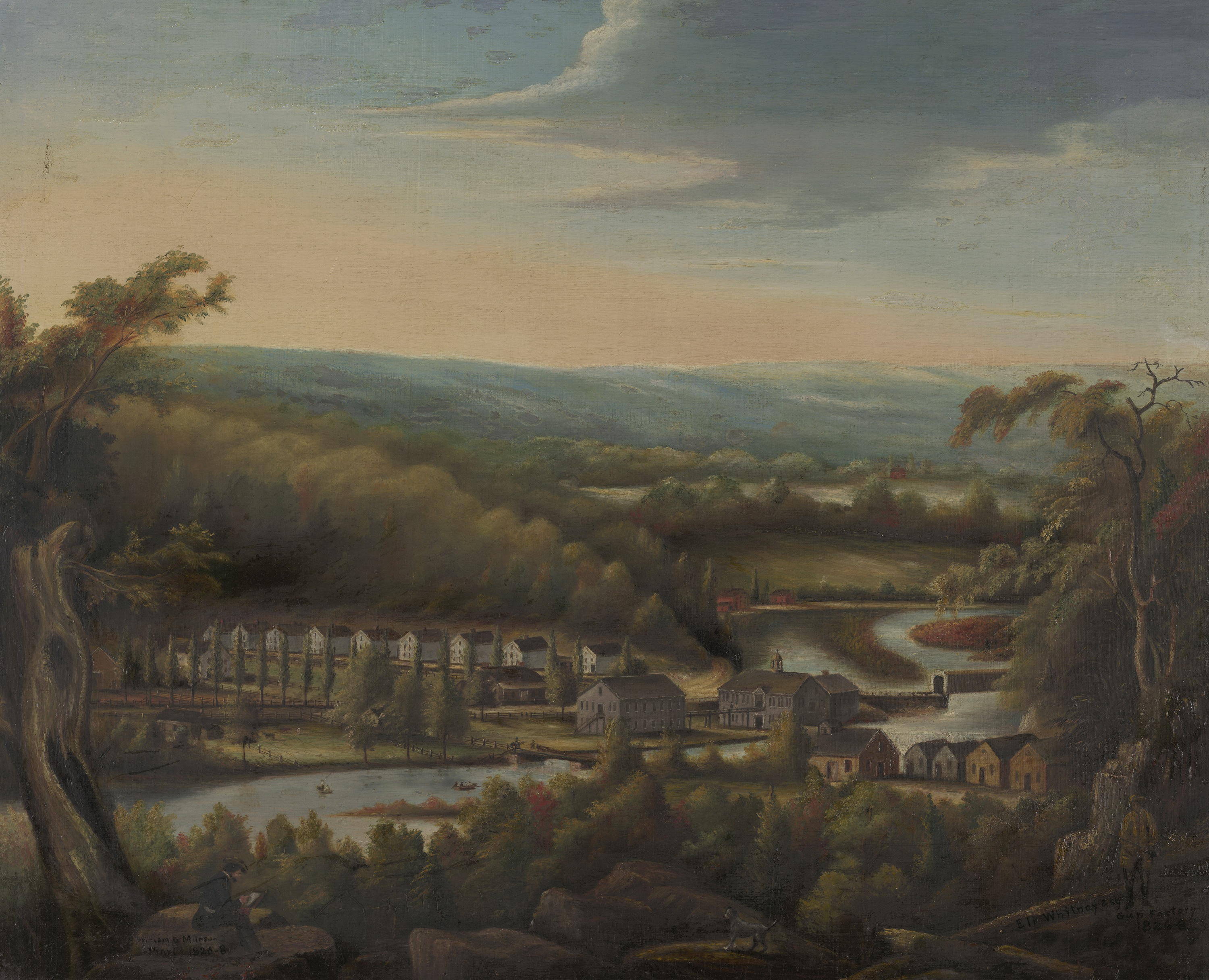
Whitney's gun factory in 1827

In May 1798, Congress voted for legislation that would use 800,000 dollars in order to pay for small arms and cannons in case war with France erupted. It offered a 5,000 dollar incentive with an additional 5,000 dollars once that money was exhausted for the person that was able to accurately produce arms for the government. Because the cotton gin had not brought Whitney the rewards he believed it promised, he accepted the offer. Although the contract was for one year, Whitney did not deliver the arms until 1809, using multiple excuses for the delay. Recently, historians have found that during 1801–1806, Whitney took the money and headed into South Carolina in order to profit from the cotton gin.

Although Whitney's demonstration of 1801 appeared to show the feasibility of creating interchangeable parts, Merritt Roe Smith concludes that it was "staged" and "duped government authorities" into believing that he had been successful. The charade gained him time and resources toward achieving that goal.

When the government complained that Whitney's price per musket compared unfavorably with those produced in government armories, he was able to calculate an actual price per musket by including fixed costs such as insurance and machinery, which the government had not accounted for. He thus made early contributions to the concepts of both cost accounting and economic efficiency in manufacturing.

=== Milling machine ===
Machine tool historian Joseph W. Roe credited Whitney with inventing the first milling machine circa 1818. Subsequent work by other historians (Note: Woodbury; Smith; Muir; Battison, cited by Baida) suggests that Whitney was among a group of contemporaries all developing milling machines at about the same time, between 1814 to 1818, and that the others were more important to the innovation than Whitney was. (Note: The machine that excited Roe may not have been built until 1825, after Whitney's death.) Therefore, no one person can properly be described as the inventor of the milling machine.

== Later life and legacy ==
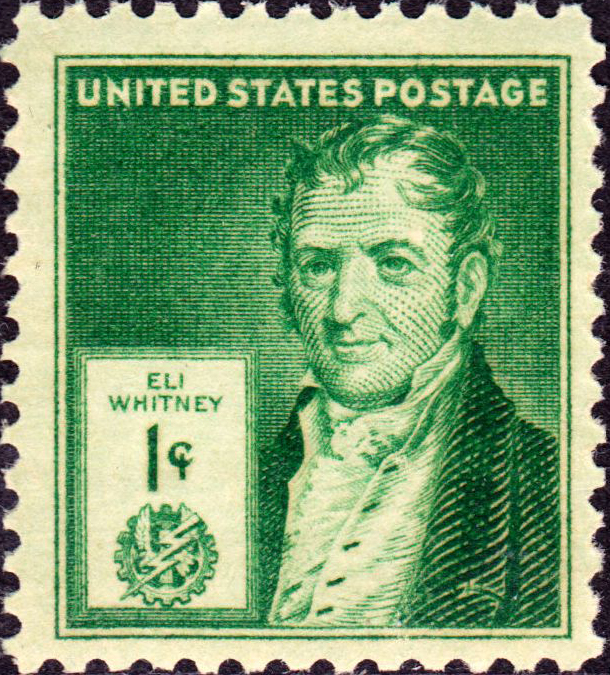
Eli Whitney on U.S. Postage Issue of 1940, 1c

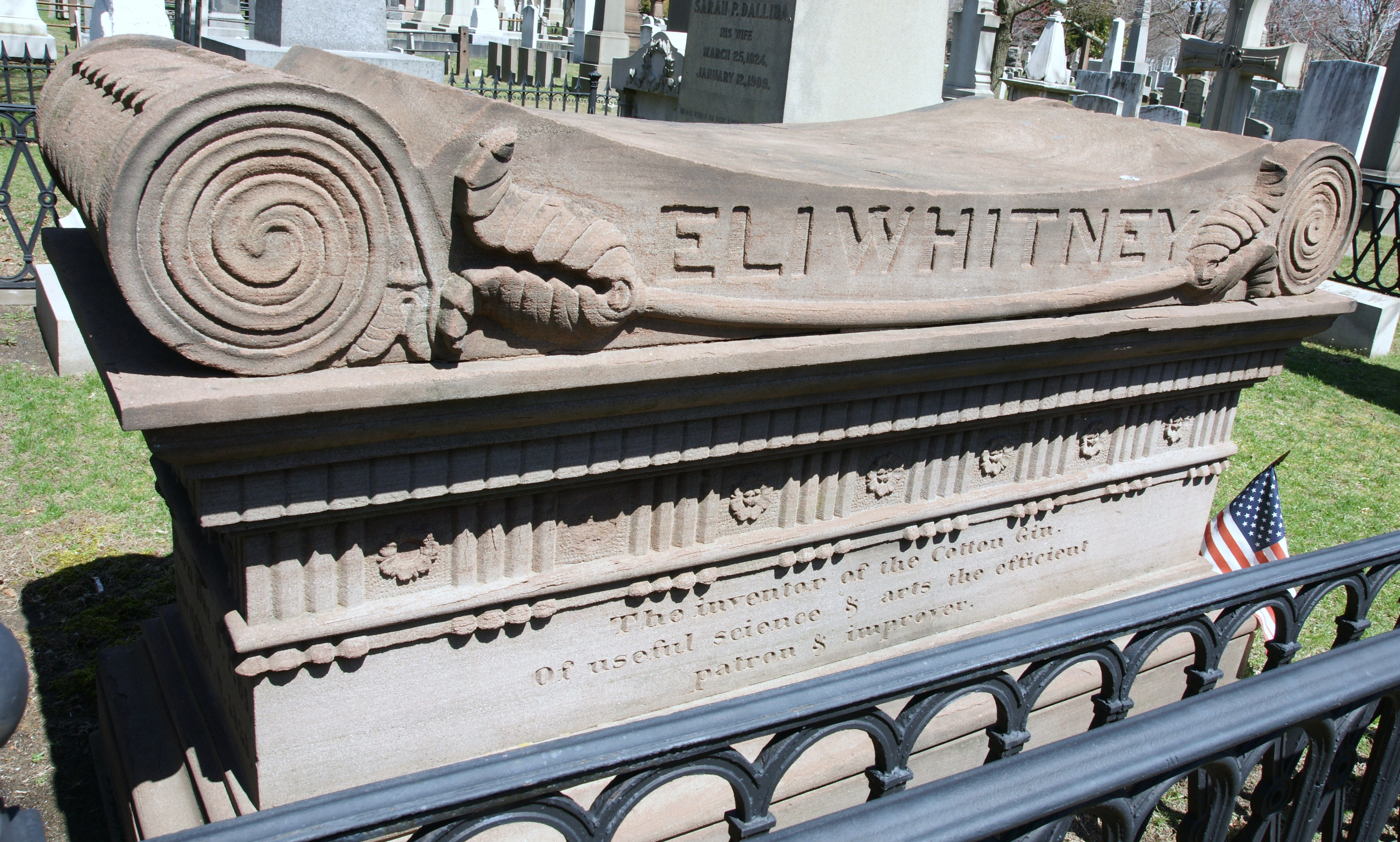
South side of Eli Whitney monument in the Grove Street Cemetery, New Haven, Connecticut

Despite his humble origins, Whitney was keenly aware of the value of social and political connections. In building his arms business, he took full advantage of the access that his status as a Yale alumnus gave him to other well placed graduates, such as Oliver Wolcott Jr., Secretary of the Treasury, and James Hillhouse, a New Haven developer and political leader.

His 1817 marriage to Henrietta Edwards, granddaughter of the famed evangelist Jonathan Edwards, daughter of Pierpont Edwards, head of the Democratic Party in Connecticut, and first cousin of Yale's president, Timothy Dwight, the state's leading Federalist, further tied him to Connecticut's ruling elite. In a business dependent on government contracts, such connections were essential to success.

Whitney died of prostate cancer on January 8, 1825, in New Haven, Connecticut, just a month after his 59th birthday. During the course of his illness, he reportedly invented and constructed several devices to ease his pain mechanically.

The Eli Whitney Students Program, Yale University's admissions program for non-traditional students, is named in honor of Whitney, who not only began his studies there when he was 23, but also went on to graduate Phi Beta Kappa in just three years.

His son, Eli Whitney III (1820–1895, known as Eli Whitney Jr.), later took over the Whitney Armory and was instrumental in building New Haven, Connecticut's, waterworks.

== See also ==
- Connecticut Academy of Arts and Sciences
- Eli Whitney Museum
- Whitney family
