= Eli Whitney Museum =

Museum in Hamden, Connecticut, US

- Eli Whitney Gun Factory
- U.S. National Register of Historic Places
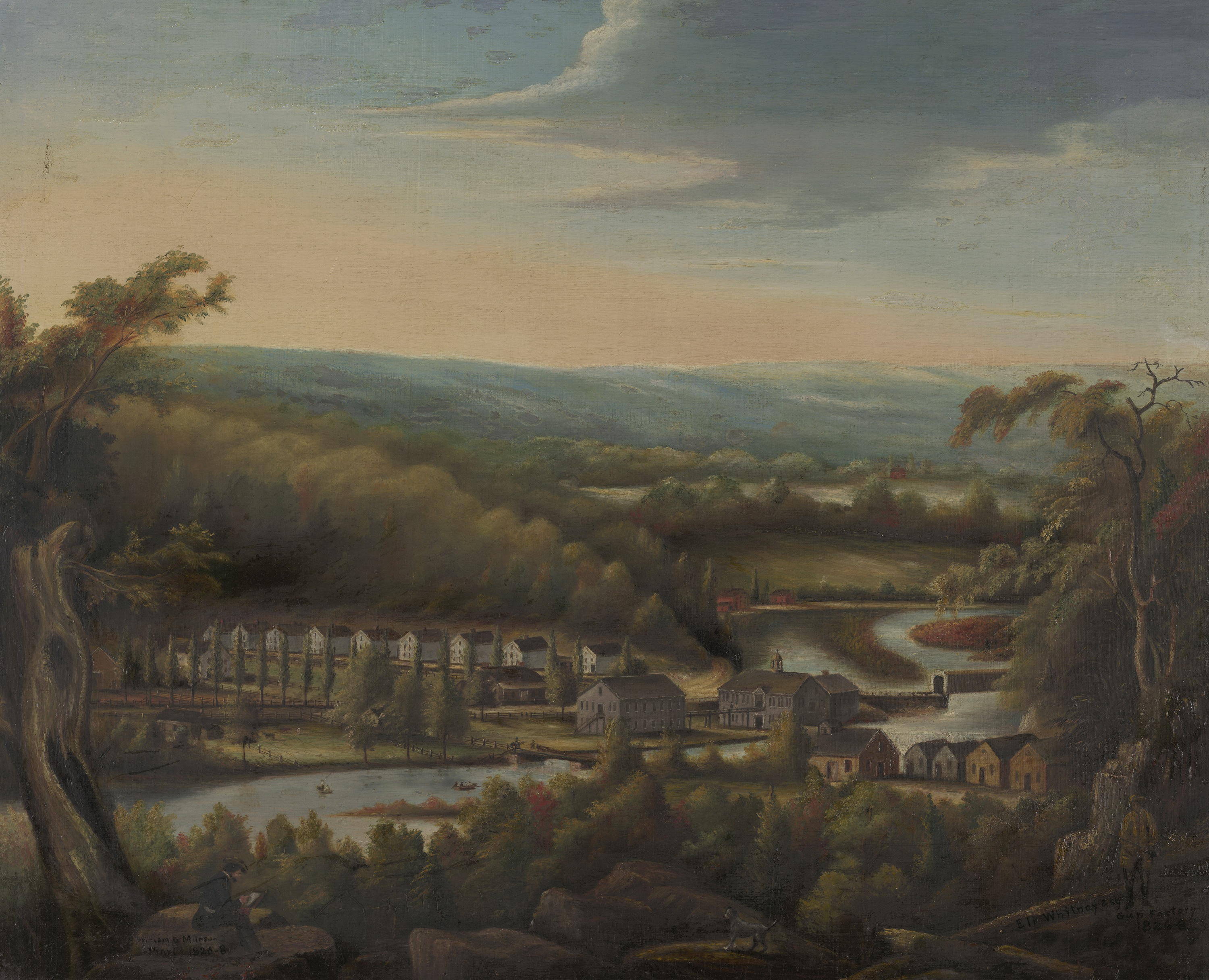
- 1827 painting of the Gun Factory by William Giles Munson

- Location within Connecticut Location within the United States
- Location: 915-940 Whitney Avenue, Hamden, Connecticut
- Coordinates: 41°20′09″N 72°54′38″W
- Area: 9.9 acres (4.0 ha)
- Built: 1798
- NRHP reference No.: 74002049
- Added to NRHP: August 13, 1974

Eli Whitney Museum
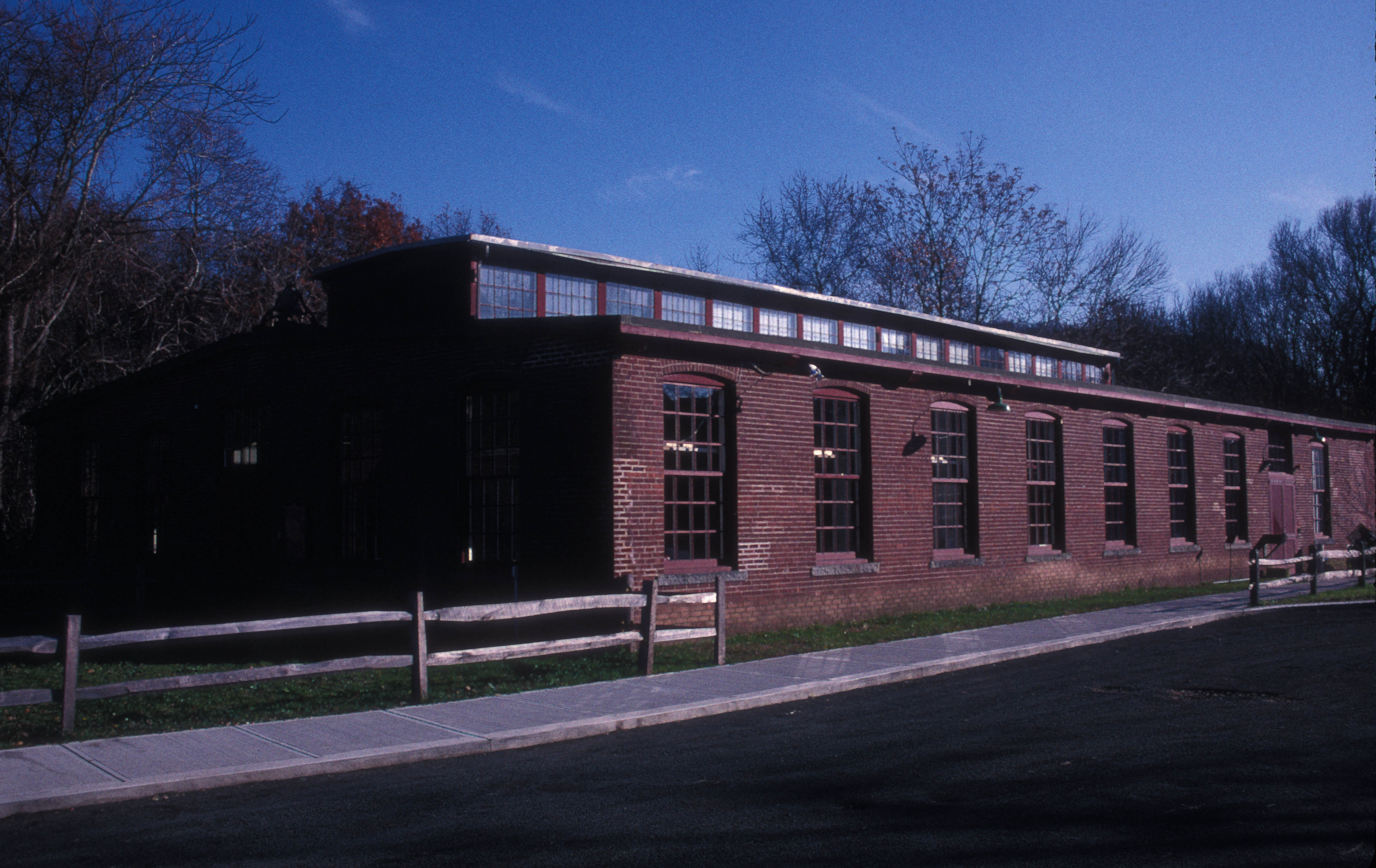
- Established: 1979
- Location: Hamden, Connecticut
- Director: Ryan Paxton
- Website: www.eliwhitney.org

The Eli Whitney Museum, in Hamden, Connecticut, is an experimental learning workshop for students, teachers, and families. The museum's main building is located on a portion of the Eli Whitney Gun Factory site, a gun factory erected by Eli Whitney in 1798. The museum focuses on teaching experiments that are the roots of design and invention, featuring hands-on building projects and exhibits on Whitney and A. C. Gilbert.

== Site history ==
The museum is located on grounds that were originally developed by Eli Whitney to produce muskets on a site he purchased on September 17, 1798. The factory was powered by water from the Mill River and produced muskets for the United States government. On June 14, 1798, he contracted to produce 10,000 muskets to be delivered within 28 months at the cost of $134,000.00; in fact, it took ten years. When he signed the contract, Whitney had no factory, no workers and no experience in gun manufacturing. However, in a letter to Secretary of the Treasury Oliver Wolcott, a fellow Yale University graduate and friend, Whitney had written:

I am persuaded that Machinery moved by water adapted to this Business would greatly diminish the labor and facilitate the manufacture of this Article. Machines for forging, rolling, floating, boring, grinding, polishing, etc. may all be made use of to advantage.... (May 13, 1798)

Whitney's factory was at the very forefront of the American Industrial Revolution, using water-powered machinery, and it was among the first to have standardized, interchangeable parts (for some but not all of its parts).

The area around the museum was once known as Whitneyville, the manufacturing village constructed along the Mill River to house the workers at the Whitney Armory, and made famous by painter William Giles Munson, who sketched the Armory in 1826, a year after Whitney died, creating at least 3 paintings from those sketches over the next two decades. The Armory produced firearms for 90 years until it started losing competition to Winchester Repeating Arms Company in late 1880s and aging son of the inventor Eli Whitney Jr. sold the factory to them in 1888, who promptly closed it down. Due to defensive patent aggregation by Winchester, no design of the firm was ever produced again.

The grounds, which span both sides of Whitney Avenue and cross the Mill River, still feature the old barn, stone coal shed and boarding house which date back to the days of Whitneyville and the operational armory, along with a reconstruction of Ithiel Town's innovative lattice truss covered bridge erected on the original pilings of one of the two bridges built to service the Eli Whitney Armory. The museum occupies a portion of the site, between Whitney Avenue and the Mill River, occupying a brick factory building built on the site in 1890. The barn and boarding house, located west of Whitney Avenue, are occupied by other nonprofit organizations.

== Museum exhibits and activities ==
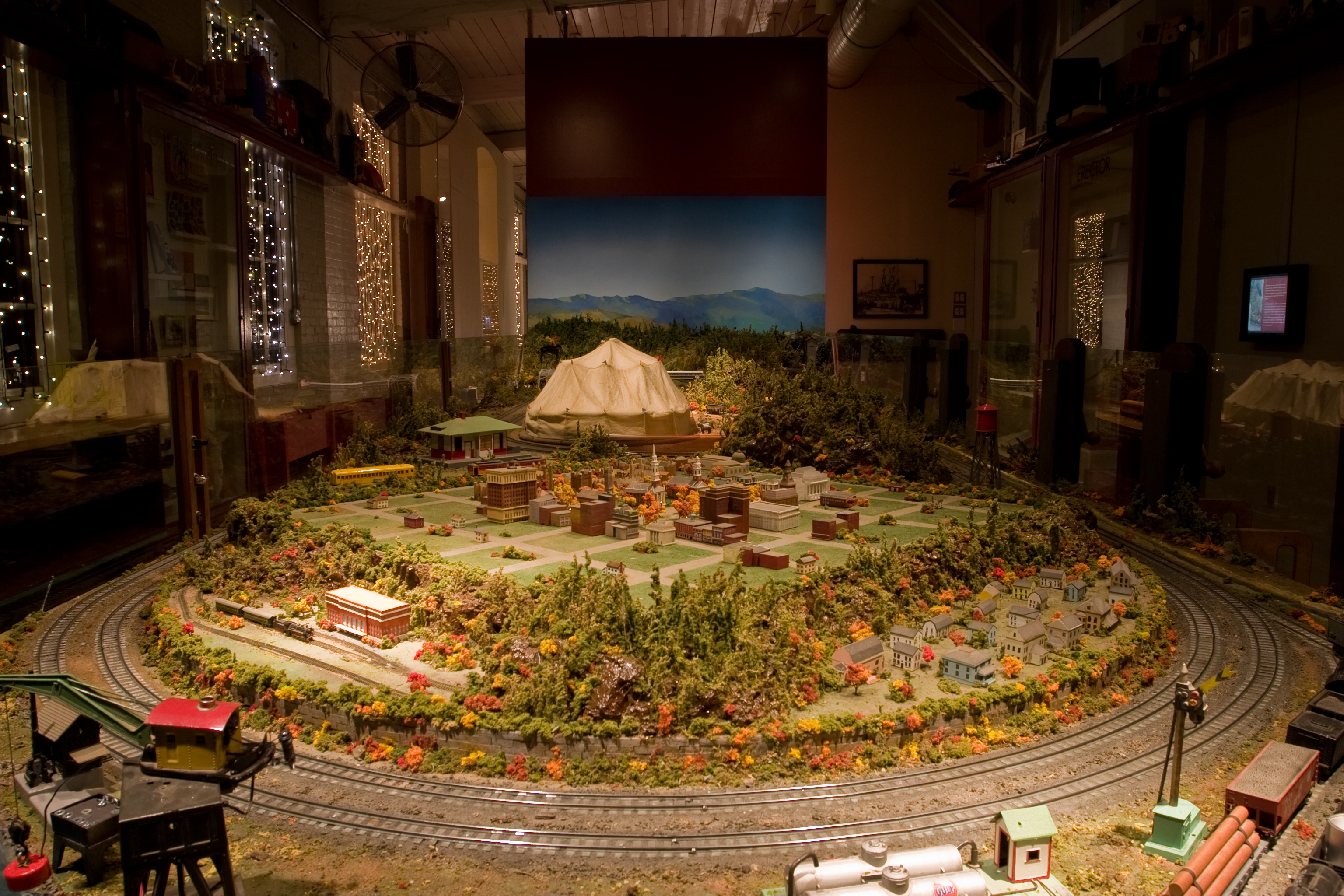
A popular exhibit is the museum's yearly holiday installation of model trains.

The Eli Whitney museum has exhibits on Whitney and his most famous invention, the cotton gin. Other exhibits cover the historic site and A. C. Gilbert, the inventor and toy maker best known for his invention of the erector set. The museum is an experimental learning workshop for design and specializes in building projects for children blending science and invention. The site is located adjacent to the dam first built by Eli Whitney to power the armory, then raised to its current height by Eli Whitney Blake to provide more power. The museum also features water tables with canal locks and is adjacent to a water reservoir as well as hiking trails. In addition to visitor hours, the museum hosts summer and holiday programs and birthday parties, and is home to the annual Leonardo Challenge, a celebration of improvisational creativity that invites artists and designers from the New Haven, Connecticut area to create uncommon inventions and designs from common objects, culminating in an exhibition of their creative efforts.

== Apprenticeship Program ==
In addition to day and weeklong education programs, the Museum supports about 60 apprentices at a time for longer-term, paid, hands-on experience. Apprentices age between 13 and 18, and generally work 200 hours through the school year, and 400 hours in the summer. They learn design, fabrication, and teaching skills, which they put to work developing and teaching exhibitions and projects. Apprenticeship alumni include Jennifer Oxley (Emmy Award-winning children's TV creator), Emily Oster (Economist), and Joshua Revkin (Star World Champion sailor).

== See also ==
- National Register of Historic Places listings in New Haven County, Connecticut
