= National Register of Historic Places listings in Clinton County, New York =

Location of Clinton County in New York

List of the National Register of Historic Places listings in Clinton County, New York

This is intended to be a complete list of National Register of Historic Places in Clinton County, New York. The locations of National Register properties and districts for which the latitude and longitude coordinates are included below, may be seen in a map.

This National Park Service list is complete through NPS recent listings posted May 1, 2026.

Contents: Counties in New York
Albany (Albany) – Allegany – Bronx – Broome – Cattaraugus – Cayuga – Chautauqua – Chemung – Chenango – Clinton – Columbia – Cortland – Delaware – Dutchess (Poughkeepsie, Rhinebeck) – Erie (Buffalo) – Essex – Franklin – Fulton – Genesee – Greene – Hamilton – Herkimer – Jefferson – Kings – Lewis – Livingston – Madison – Monroe (Rochester) – Montgomery – Nassau – New York (Below 14th Street, 14th to 59th Streets, 59th to 110th Streets, Above 110th Street, Islands) – Niagara (Niagara Falls) – Oneida – Onondaga (Syracuse) – Ontario – Orange – Orleans – Oswego – Otsego – Putnam – Queens – Rensselaer – Richmond – Rockland – St. Lawrence – Saratoga – Schenectady – Schoharie – Schuyler – Seneca – Steuben – Suffolk – Sullivan – Tioga – Tompkins – Ulster – Warren – Washington – Wayne – Westchester (Northern, Southern, New Rochelle, Peekskill, Yonkers) – Wyoming – Yates

== Listings county-wide ==
	Name on the Register	Image	Date listed	Location	City or town	Description
1	Adirondack Forest Preserve	Adirondack Forest Preserve	October 15, 1966 (#66000891)	Northeast New York State; 43°58′43″N 74°18′42″W	Clinton County	
2	AuSable Chasm Bridge	AuSable Chasm Bridge	November 12, 1999 (#99001320)	U.S. Route 9 over the Ausable River; 44°31′29″N 73°27′48″W	Ausable Chasm (Chesterfield)	Extends into Essex County
3	William Bailey House	William Bailey House	November 12, 1982 (#82001098)	176 Cornelia St. 44°42′03″N 73°27′53″W	Plattsburgh	
4	Brinkerhoff Street Historic District	Brinkerhoff Street Historic District	November 12, 1982 (#82001099)	Brinkerhoff St. between Oak and N. Catherine Sts. 44°41′49″N 73°27′25″W	Plattsburgh	
5	Carpenter's Flats Bridge	Carpenter's Flats Bridge	November 12, 1999 (#99001321)	U.S. Route 9 over the Ausable River; 44°33′32″N 73°26′57″W	AuSable and Peru	
6	John B. Carpenter House		November 12, 1982 (#82001100)	42 Prospect Ave. 44°42′02″N 73°28′24″W	Plattsburgh	
7	Church of St. Dismas, the Good Thief		November 21, 1991 (#91001673)	Clinton Correctional Facility, Cook St. 44°43′29″N 73°43′21″W	Dannemora	
8	City Hall	City Hall	December 12, 1973 (#73001170)	City Hall Pl. 44°41′57″N 73°27′09″W	Plattsburgh	
9	Clinton County Courthouse Complex	Clinton County Courthouse Complex	November 12, 1982 (#82001101)	135 Margaret St. 44°41′56″N 73°27′13″W	Plattsburgh	
10	Court Street Historic District	Court Street Historic District	February 24, 1983 (#83001664)	Court St. between Oak and Beekman Sts. 44°41′53″N 73°27′32″W	Plattsburgh	
11	D & H Railroad Complex	D & H Railroad Complex	November 12, 1982 (#82001102)	Bridge St. 44°41′51″N 73°26′43″W	Plattsburgh	
12	D'Youville Academy	D'Youville Academy	November 12, 1982 (#82001103)	100 Cornelia St. 44°41′58″N 73°27′28″W	Plattsburgh	
13	Delaware and Hudson Railroad Bridge		November 12, 1999 (#99001317)	Over AuSable River northeast of Lakeside Rd. 44°33′20″N 73°26′05″W	AuSable and Peru	
14	Double-Span Metal Pratt Truss Bridge	Double-Span Metal Pratt Truss Bridge	May 20, 1983 (#83001665)	AuSable St. 44°30′01″N 73°29′07″W	Keeseville	
15	First Presbyterian Church	First Presbyterian Church	November 12, 1982 (#82001104)	34 Brinkerhoff St. 44°41′50″N 73°27′16″W	Plattsburgh	
16	Fort Brown Site		December 15, 1978 (#78001846)	Northwest of the intersection of Elizabeth St. and State Route 9; 44°41′19″N 73°27′01″W	Plattsburgh	
17	Fort Montgomery	Fort Montgomery	August 22, 1977 (#77000937)	Address Restricted	Rouses Point	Site of American fort built on Lake Champlain, accidentally located over the border in Canada
18	Hamlet of Schuyler Falls Historic District		February 11, 2026 (#100012711)	NYS-22B: Felton Road; 44°37′44″N 73°33′29″W	Schuyler Falls	
19	W. W. Hartwell House & Dependencies	W. W. Hartwell House & Dependencies	November 12, 1982 (#82001105)	77 Brinkerhoff St. 44°41′47″N 73°27′32″W	Plattsburgh	
20	Hawkins Hall	Hawkins Hall	November 12, 1982 (#82001106)	Beekman St. 44°41′50″N 73°28′04″W	Plattsburgh	
21	Heyworth–Mason Industrial Building	Heyworth–Mason Industrial Building	May 6, 2011 (#11000250)	Mason Hill Road; 44°34′44″N 73°31′28″W	Peru	
22	House at 56 Cornelia Street	House at 56 Cornelia Street	November 12, 1982 (#82001107)	56 Cornelia St. 44°41′58″N 73°27′09″W	Plattsburgh	
23	Keeseville Historic District	Keeseville Historic District	May 20, 1983 (#83001666)	Roughly bounded by Vine, Chesterfield, Clinton, Hill, Pleasant, Front, and Beech Sts. 44°30′16″N 73°28′58″W	Keeseville	
24	Kent-Delord House	Kent-Delord House	February 18, 1971 (#71000532)	17 Cumberland Ave. 44°42′12″N 73°27′08″W	Plattsburgh	
25	Lyon Mountain Railroad Station	Lyon Mountain Railroad Station	February 14, 2002 (#02000005)	2914 First St. 44°43′35″N 73°54′39″W	Lyon Mountain	
26	Lyon Street School		May 22, 2013 (#13000304)	Rock & Lyons Rds. 44°36′25″N 73°27′41″W	Peru	
27	Paul Marshall House	Paul Marshall House	November 12, 1982 (#82001108)	24-26 Cornelia St. 44°41′59″N 73°27′09″W	Plattsburgh	
28	Miller Homestead	Miller Homestead	July 28, 1999 (#99000910)	664 Hallock Hill Rd. 44°31′26″N 73°33′40″W	Au Sable	
29	Alice T. Miner Colonial Collection	Alice T. Miner Colonial Collection	September 24, 2010 (#10000799)	9618 State Road Route 9; 44°53′10″N 73°26′08″W	Chazy	
30	Mooers Riverside Cemetery	Mooers Riverside Cemetery	September 14, 2018 (#100002921)	U.S. Route 11 and Mill Street; 44°57′36″N 73°35′11″W	Mooers	Burial place of many early settlers of town, including General Benjamin Mooers, for whom it is named
31	Old State Road Bridge	Old State Road Bridge	November 12, 1999 (#99001319)	Co. Rt. 17B over the Ausable River; 44°31′25″N 73°27′37″W	AuSable Chasm	Extends into Essex County, New York
32	Old Stone Barracks	Old Stone Barracks	February 18, 1971 (#71000533)	Rhode Island Ave., Plattsburgh Air Force Base; 44°40′51″N 73°26′42″W	Plattsburgh	Now converted into a microbrewery, meeting place and bed and breakfast under the name "Valcour Brewing Company"
33	Palmer Brook Bridge	Palmer Brook Bridge	November 12, 1999 (#99001318)	Golf Course Rd. over Palmer Brook; 44°26′37″N 73°40′29″W	AuSable Forks	Replaced in 2003
34	Peru Community Church	Peru Community Church	February 2, 2001 (#01000054)	12 Elm St. 44°34′43″N 73°31′40″W	Peru	
35	Pike's Cantonment Site		August 14, 2012 (#12000508)	Address Restricted	Plattsburgh	
36	Charles C. Platt Homestead	Charles C. Platt Homestead	November 12, 1982 (#82001109)	96-98 Boynton Ave. 44°42′30″N 73°27′40″W	Plattsburgh	
37	Plattsburgh Bay	Plattsburgh Bay	October 15, 1966 (#66000507)	Cumberland Bay, east of Plattsburgh; 44°41′17″N 73°24′58″W	Plattsburgh	Site of naval Battle of Plattsburgh, last British attempt to invade northern states during War of 1812
38	The Point Historic District	The Point Historic District	November 12, 1982 (#82001110)	Roughly bounded by Jay, Hamilton, Peru, and Bridge Sts. 44°41′54″N 73°26′46″W	Plattsburgh	
39	Z. Ritchie House		November 12, 1982 (#82001111)	26 S. Catherine St. 44°42′02″N 73°27′27″W	Plattsburgh	
40	Rouses Point Railroad Station	Rouses Point Railroad Station	January 5, 2005 (#04001454)	68 Pratt St. 44°59′42″N 73°22′18″W	Rouses Point	
41	St. John the Baptist Roman Catholic Church and Rectory	St. John the Baptist Roman Catholic Church and Rectory	November 12, 1982 (#82001112)	20 Broad St. 44°41′44″N 73°27′17″W	Plattsburgh	
42	Stone Arch Bridge	Stone Arch Bridge	November 12, 1999 (#99001323)	Main St. over the Ausable River; 44°30′19″N 73°28′52″W	Keeseville	
43	SPITFIRE (gunboat)	SPITFIRE (gunboat)	July 24, 2008 (#08000694)	At the bottom of Lake Champlain	Lake Champlain	Shared with Essex County; Revolutionary War shipwreck
44	Strand Theater	Strand Theater	September 15, 2008 (#08000922)	25 Brinkerhoff St. 44°30′13″N 73°28′58″W	Plattsburgh	
45	Swing Bridge	Swing Bridge	November 12, 1999 (#99001322)	Over the Ausable River between Clinton and S. AuSable Sts. 44°30′13″N 73°28′58″W	Keeseville	
46	U.S. Inspection Station-Mooers, New York	U.S. Inspection Station-Mooers, New York	September 14, 2014 (#14000572)	NY 22; 45°00′16″N 73°36′11″W	Mooers	
47	U.S. Inspection Station-Rouses Point (Overton Corners), New York	U.S. Inspection Station-Rouses Point (Overton Corners), New York	September 14, 2014 (#14000573)	NY 276; 45°00′36″N 73°24′01″W	Rouses Point	
48	U.S. Inspection Station-Rouses Point (St. John's Highway), New York	U.S. Inspection Station-Rouses Point (St. John's Highway), New York	September 14, 2014 (#14000574)	NY 9B; 45°00′37″N 73°22′15″W	Rouses Point	
49	United States Oval Historic District	United States Oval Historic District	August 30, 1989 (#85003766)	Plattsburgh Air Force Base; 44°41′11″N 73°26′53″W	Plattsburgh	
50	Valcour Bay	Valcour Bay	October 15, 1966 (#66000508)	7 miles (11 km) south of Plattsburgh on the west shore of Lake Champlain; 44°38′05″N 73°25′47″W	Plattsburgh	Site of Battle of Valcour Island during Revolutionary War
51	Valcour Island Lighthouse	Valcour Island Lighthouse	August 26, 1993 (#93000873)	Valcour Island, Lake Champlain; 44°37′24″N 73°25′55″W	Peru	A.K.A. Point Bluff Light
52	S. F. Vilas Home for Aged & Infirmed Ladies	S. F. Vilas Home for Aged & Infirmed Ladies	November 12, 1982 (#82001113)	Beekman and Cornelia Sts. 44°41′56″N 73°28′02″W	Plattsburgh	
53	W. G. Wilcox House	W. G. Wilcox House	February 24, 1983 (#83001667)	45-51 Lorraine St. 44°42′08″N 73°26′52″W	Plattsburgh	
54	Werrenrath Camp		November 29, 2010 (#10000943)	55 Island Dr. 44°45′19″N 73°48′05″W	Dannemora	
55	Winslow–Turner Carriage House	Winslow–Turner Carriage House	November 12, 1982 (#82001114)	210 Cornelia St. 44°41′56″N 73°28′28″W	Plattsburgh	

== See also ==
- National Register of Historic Places listings in New York
