= Miller Homestead =

Miller Homestead may refer to:

- Miller Homestead (Pea Ridge, Arkansas), listed on the NRHP in Arkansas
- J. K. Miller Homestead, Big Prairie, Montana, listed on the NRHP in Flathead County, Montana
- Miller Homestead (Au Sable, New York), listed on the NRHP in New York
- Miller Homestead (Lansing, North Carolina), listed on the NRHP in North Carolina

== See also ==
- Miller House (disambiguation)
