= Hartwell House =

Hartwell House may refer to:

in England

- Hartwell House, Buckinghamshire

in the United States

(sorted by state, then city/town)

- John S. Hartwell House, Pasadena, CA, listed on the National Register of Historic Places (NRHP) in Los Angeles County, California
- Hartwell House (Reading, Massachusetts), NRHP-listed
- George H. Hartwell House, Southbridge, Massachusetts, NRHP-listed
- Samuel Hartwell House, Lincoln, Massachusetts
- Samuel C. Hartwell House, Southbridge, Massachusetts, NRHP-listed
- W. W. Hartwell House & Dependencies, Plattsburgh, New York, NRHP-listed
