= List of Registered Historic Places in Clinton County =

List of Registered Historic Places in Clinton County may refer to:

- List of Registered Historic Places in Clinton County, New York
- List of Registered Historic Places in Clinton County, Michigan
