= The Point Historic District =

Historic district in New York, United States

- U.S. National Register of Historic Places
- U.S. Historic district
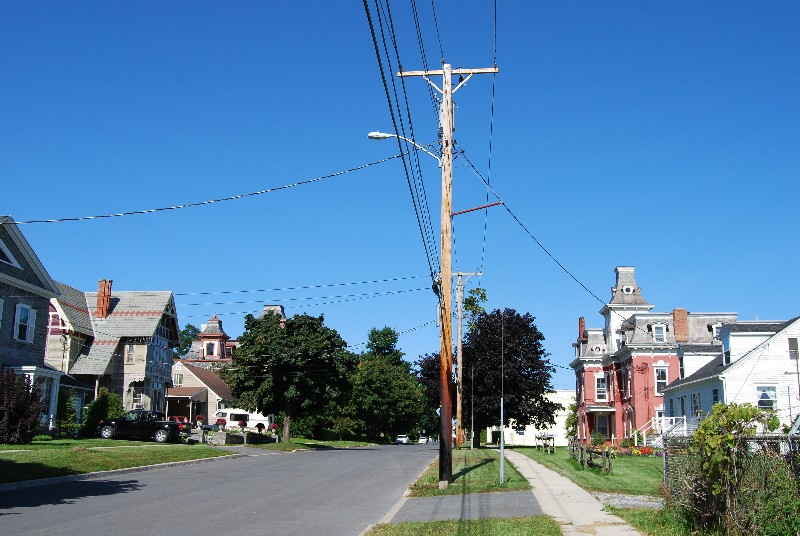
- Macomb Street

- Location within New York Location within the United States
- Location: Roughly bounded by Jay, Hamilton, Peru, and Bridge Sts., Plattsburgh, New York
- Coordinates: 44°41′44″N 73°26′49″W
- Area: 16 acres (6.5 ha)
- Built: c. 1815
- Architectural style: Mid 19th Century Revival, Late Victorian, Federal
- MPS: Plattsburgh City MRA
- NRHP reference No.: 82001110
- Added to NRHP: November 12, 1982

The Point is a national historic district located at Plattsburgh, Clinton County, New York. It encompasses 33 contributing buildings and contains a collection of historic homes dating from about 1815. The district is adjacent to the historic D & H Railroad Complex and also Plattsburgh Bay, an arm of Lake Champlain. It is bounded by the railroad from the north, by Plattsburgh Bay from the east, and by the Saranac River, which separates it from downtown Plattsburgh, from the west.

The historic district was added to the National Register of Historic Places on November 12, 1982.

== Gallery ==
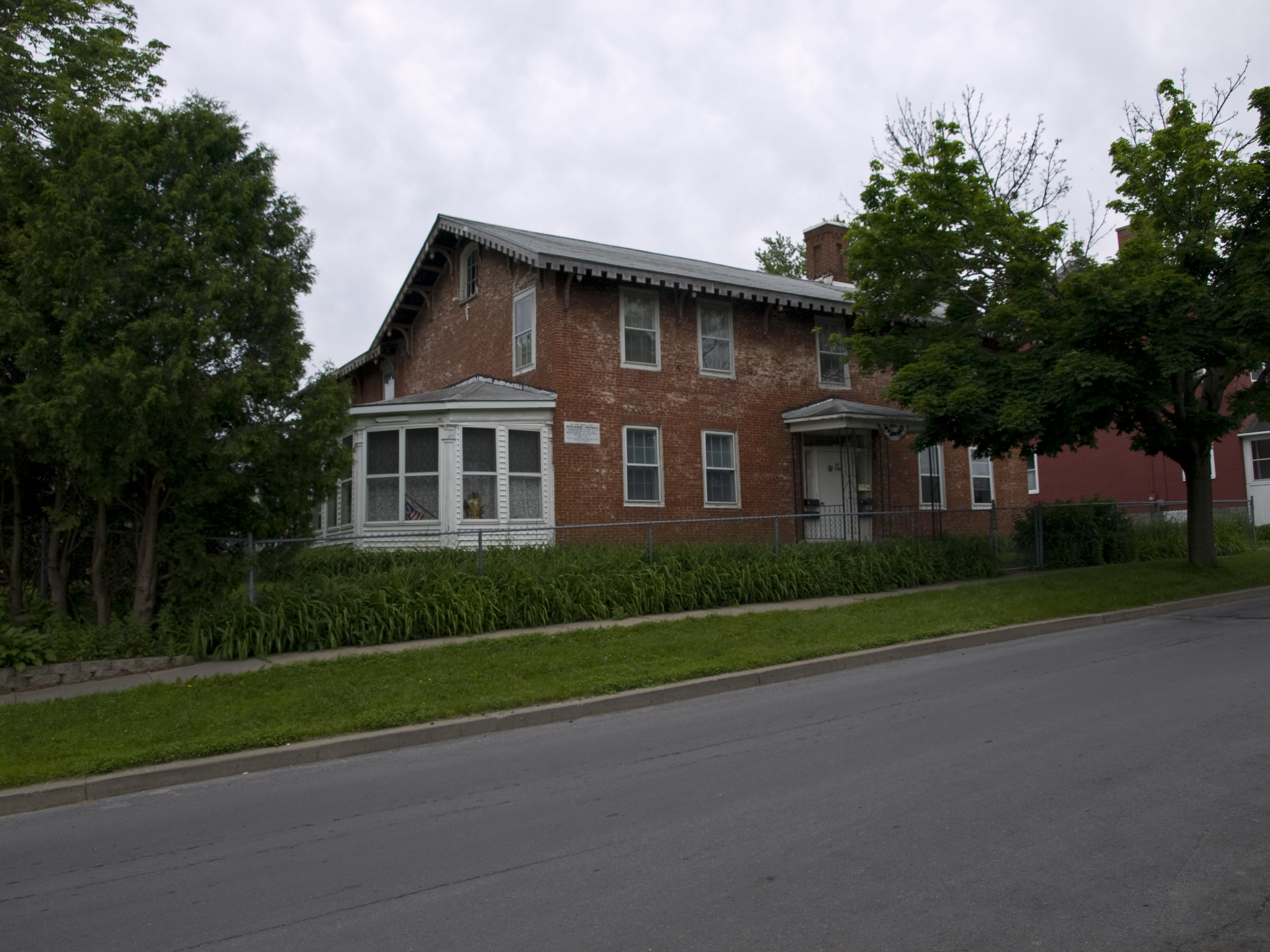
44 Pike Street, a contributing property

== See also ==
- List of Registered Historic Places in Clinton County, New York
