= Reinald Werrenrath =

American opera singer

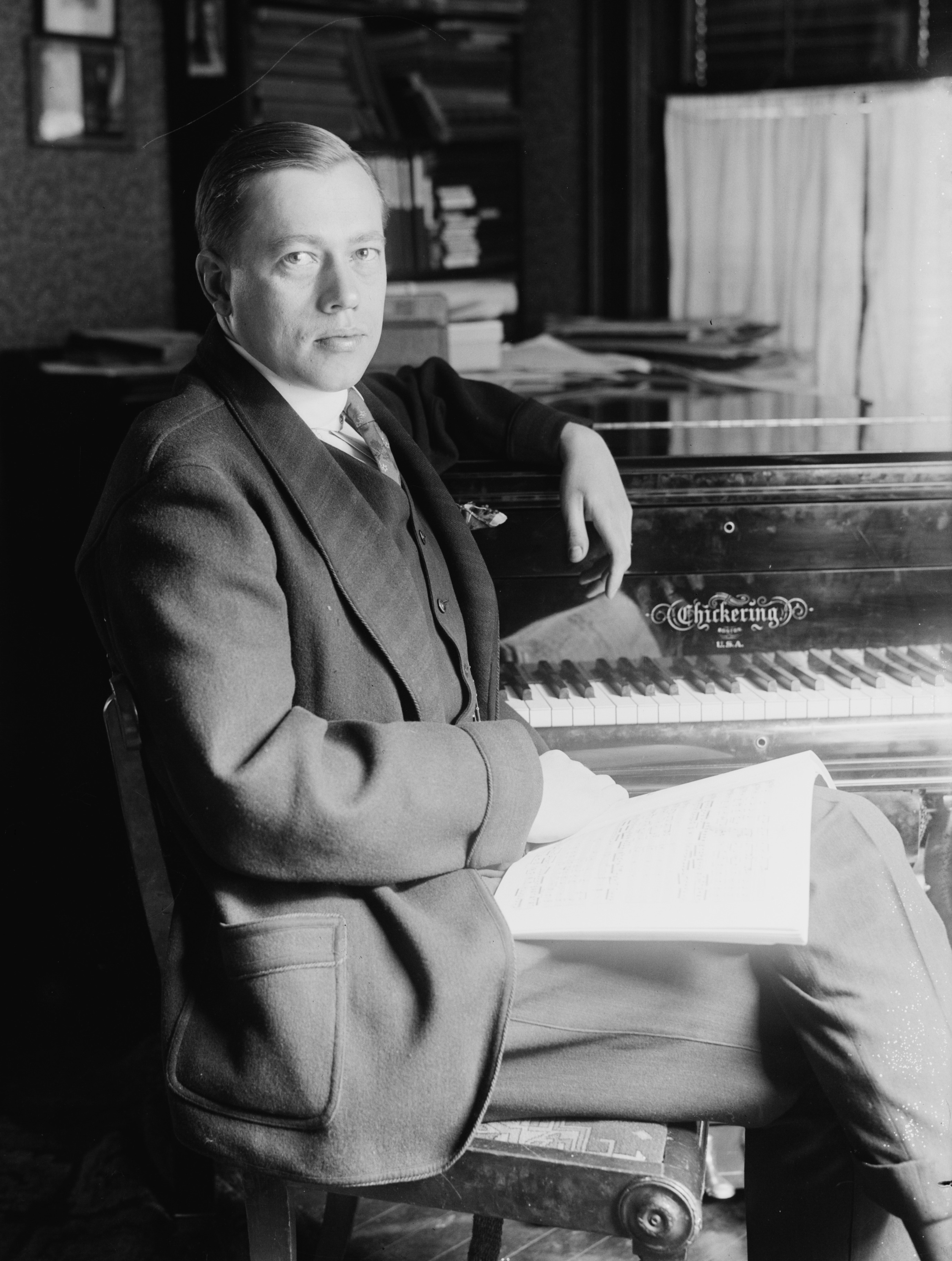
Werrenrath in 1917 at his piano

Reinald Werrenrath (August 7, 1883 – September 12, 1953) was an American baritone singer. He worked primarily in opera but also recorded popular songs and appeared regularly on radio in the early decades of the twentieth century. Werrenrath commonly used the pseudonym Edward Hamilton.

== Biography ==
"Drink to Me Only with Thine Eyes"
A 1916 recording of Werrenrath performing "Drink to Me Only with Thine Eyes"

Werrenrath was born in Brooklyn, New York, the son of George Werrenrath, an operatic tenor born in Denmark. He studied at New York University, and made his operatic debut in 1907 in Die Meistersinger. He also recorded for Edison Records in 1907, before a long recording career with the Victor Talking Machine Company. He sang on several hundred Victor recordings between 1906 and 1929, both as a soloist and as part of various vocal ensembles such as the Orpheus Quartet and the Victor Opera Quartet. His most commercially successful recordings included "As Long As The World Rolls On" (1907), "Hello Frisco!" (from "Ziegfeld Follies of 1915"), and "Smilin' Through" (1919).

Werrenrath made his debut at the Metropolitan Opera in 1919, in Pagliacci, in a cast that also included Enrico Caruso. He also toured widely, and made over 3,000 concert appearances. He was one of the first singing stars to appear regularly on radio, notably on radio station WEAF in New York. In 1930, he made a private recording of Christmas greetings accompanied by Harpo Marx and others. In 1932, he became a member of NBC's music staff, and in later years devoted himself mainly to teaching, predominantly at the Peabody Conservatory in Baltimore, Maryland. He also ran a regular summer music school at Chazy Lake, New York.

He was married three times. He died on September 12, 1953, in Plattsburgh, New York, after suffering a heart attack while at Chazy Lake.

His home on Chazy Lake, Werrenrath Camp, was added to the National Register of Historic Places in 2010.
