= D'Youville =

D'Youville may refer to:

- Marie-Marguerite d'Youville, Canadian saint
- D'Youville Academy
- D'Youville University
