= Plattsburgh Bay =

- U.S. National Register of Historic Places
- U.S. National Historic Landmark
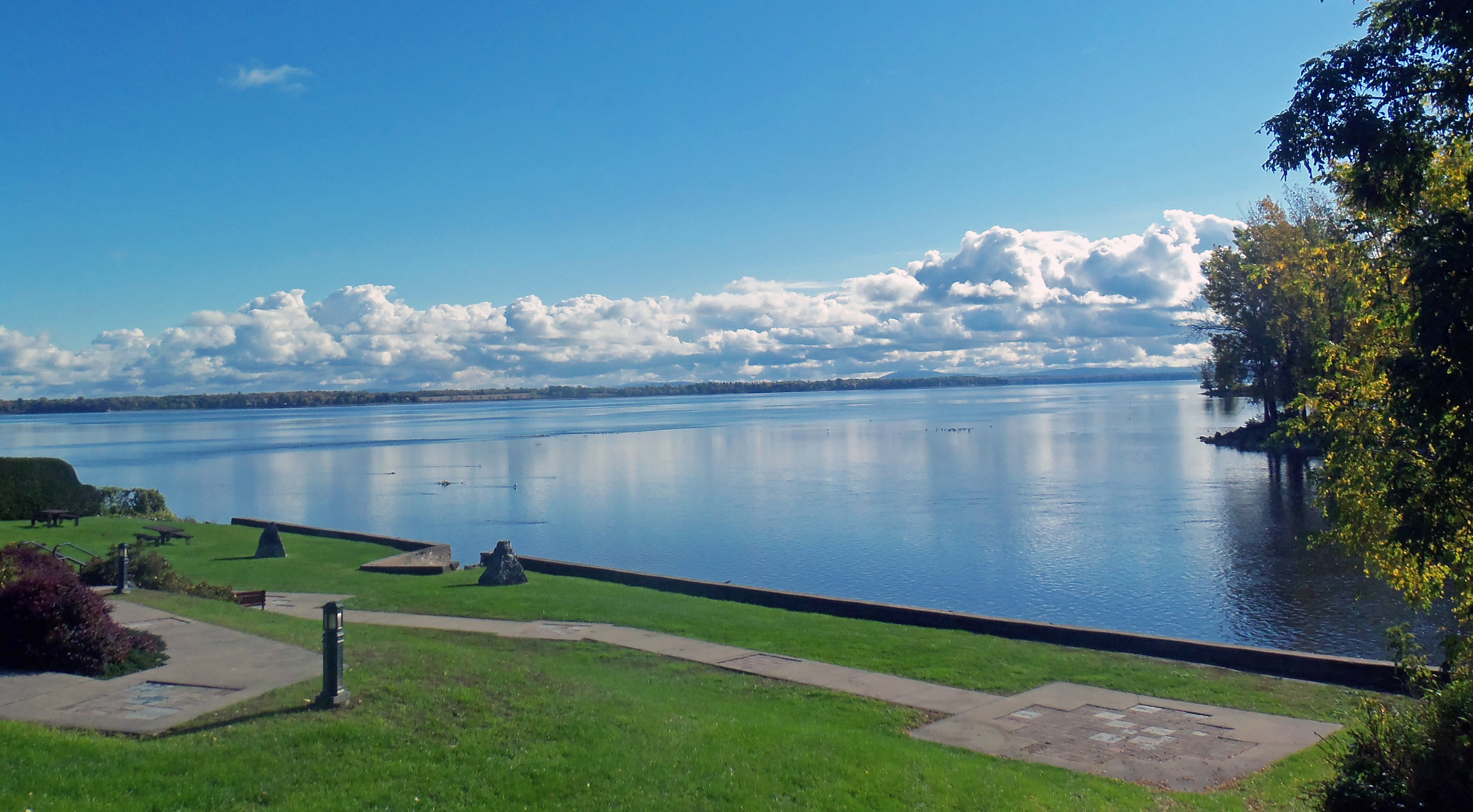
- Bay in 2012

- Location within New York Location within the United States
- Location: Plattsburgh, NY
- Coordinates: 44.692576°N 73.376141°W
- Area: 7,025 acres (2,843 ha)
- Built: 1814
- NRHP reference No.: 66000507

Significant dates
- Added to NRHP: October 15, 1966
- Designated NHL: December 19, 1960

Plattsburgh Bay, also known as Cumberland Bay, is an inlet on the western shore of Lake Champlain in Clinton County, New York. The bay is the location of the town and city of Plattsburgh, and was the site of the Battle of Plattsburgh, a naval and land engagement fought on September 11, 1814, late in the War of 1812. The bay and two land sites related to the battle were designated as a National Historic Landmark in 1960.

== Description and history ==
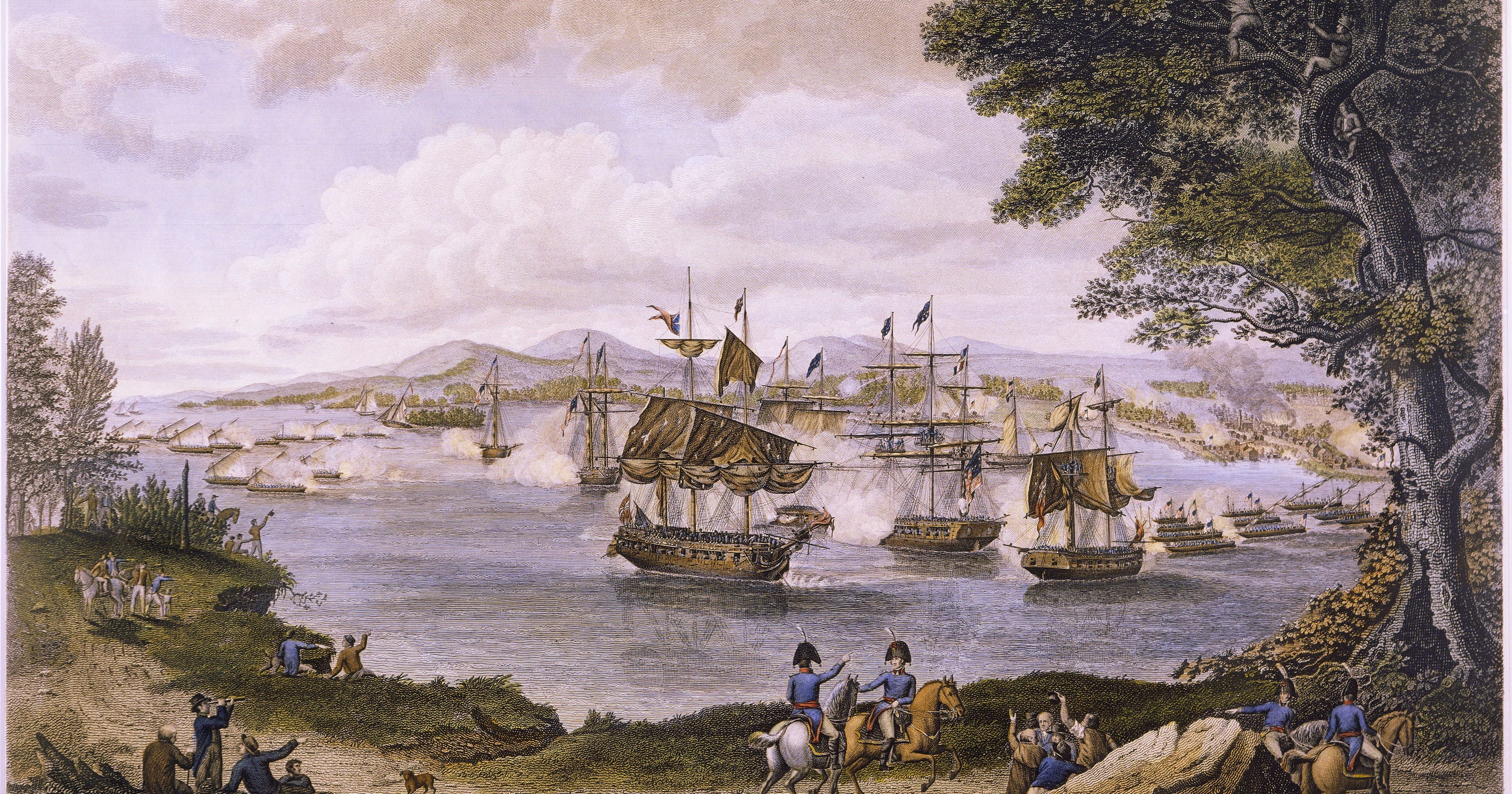
Battle of Plattsburgh, seen from Cumberland Head

Plattsburgh Bay is located in the northern third of Lake Champlain, on its western shore opposite Grand Isle. It is bounded on the north and east by Cumberland Head, a peninsula extending east and then south, and on the west by the mainland city of Plattsburgh. The southern tip of Cumberland Head is about 2.8 miles (4.5 km) east of the city's shoreline. Southeast of the city, several miles south of the bay, lies Crab Island, which also played a significant role in the 1814 Battle of Plattsburgh, and is included in the landmarked area of the bay.

In September 1814, Plattsburgh came under attack by British forces from Canada seeking to gain territory for advantage in peace talks which were then ongoing. The city was occupied by British land forces on September 6, and preparations were made for a decisive sea battle for control of the lake. American ships were arrayed across the mouth of the bay between Cumberland Head and Crab Island, and won a decisive victory over the British fleet. At the same time, the British land forces were repulsed by Americans in repeated attempts to cross the Saranac River. One of the principal American land defenses was Fort Brown, which is included in landmark as a separate area.

The third segment of the landmark is the Macdonough Memorial, placed in front of Plattsburgh City Hall and dedicated in 1926. A limestone obelisk 135 feet (41 m) in height, it honors Captain Thomas Macdonough, leader of the American naval forces in the battle.

== See also ==
- List of National Historic Landmarks in New York
- National Register of Historic Places listings in Clinton County, New York
