= Lyon Mountain Correctional Facility =

Former prison located in New York, US

Coordinates: 44°43′52″N 73°54′31″W

Lyon Mountain Correctional Facility was a prison located in the western part of the Town of Dannemora in Clinton County, New York, near the community of Lyon Mountain. The prison closed on January 31, 2011.
