= Lyon Mountain, New York =

- Census-designated place & hamlet
- Location in Clinton County and the state of New York.
- Coordinates: 44°43′44″N 73°54′28″W
- Country: United States
- State: New York
- County: Clinton
- Town: Dannemora

Area
  - Total: 10.52 sq mi (27.25 km^{2})
  - Land: 10.51 sq mi (27.23 km^{2})
  - Water: 0.0077 sq mi (0.02 km^{2})
- Elevation: 1,798 ft (548 m)

Population (2020)
  - Total: 421
  - Density: 40.0/sq mi (15.46/km^{2})
- Time zone: UTC-5 (Eastern (EST))
  - Summer (DST): UTC-4 (EDT)
- ZIP codes: 12952, 12955
- Area code: 518
- FIPS code: 36-43951
- GNIS feature ID: 0956192

Lyon Mountain is a hamlet and census-designated place located in the town of Dannemora in Clinton County, New York, United States. As of the 2020 census, Lyon Mountain had a population of 421.

The northern slopes of Lyon Mountain are in the southern part of the community, with the 3,840-foot (1,170 m) summit to the south in the town of Saranac.

The Lyon Mountain Correctional Facility, a minimum security prison, was located in the community. The facility closed in 2011, and has been purchased by a Canadian who has mined sand for hydrofracking from the site.

== Geography ==
The hamlet of Lyon Mountain is located at 44°43′44″N 73°54′28″W (44.728863, -73.907905). According to the United States Census Bureau, the CDP has a total area of 10.2 square miles (26.3 km^{2}), all land.

Lyon Mountain is on New York State Route 374, which leads east 12 miles (19 km) to Dannemora village and northwest 17 miles (27 km) to Chateaugay.

== Demographics ==
Historical population
Census	Pop.	Note	%±
2000	482		—
2010	423		−12.2%
2020	421		−0.5%
U.S. Decennial Census

As of the census of 2000, there were 458 people, 214 households, and 129 families residing in the hamlet. The population density was 45.0 inhabitants per square mile (17.4/km^{2}). There were 234 housing units at an average density of 23.0 per square mile (8.9/km^{2}). The racial makeup of the CDP was 95.85% White, 0.22% African American, 1.09% Native American, 0.22% Pacific Islander, and 2.62% from two or more races.

There were 214 households, out of which 22.0% had children under the age of 18 living with them, 47.2% were married couples living together, 8.9% had a female householder with no husband present, and 39.3% were non-families. 36.0% of all households were made up of individuals, and 22.9% had someone living alone who was 65 years of age or older. The average household size was 2.14 and the average family size was 2.72.

In the community, the population was spread out, with 18.3% under the age of 18, 5.7% from 18 to 24, 22.5% from 25 to 44, 30.6% from 45 to 64, and 22.9% who were 65 years of age or older. The median age was 46 years. For every 100 females, there were 93.2 males. For every 100 females age 18 and over, there were 85.1 males.

The median income for a household in the village was $25,000, and the median income for a family was $41,250. Males had a median income of $39,688 versus $20,250 for females. The per capita income for the CDP was $16,776. About 14.8% of families and 14.1% of the population were below the poverty line, including 21.7% of those under age 18 and 7.7% of those age 65 or over.

== History ==
The hamlet is named after Nathaniel Lyon, who moved to the base of the mountain that also bears his name in 1803 and died circa 1850. Lyon was a relative of General Nathaniel Lyon (1818–1861).

== Industry ==
Republic Steel Corporation was one of the last major steel firms to use low-phosphorus Adirondack magnetites, operating the Chateaugay Ore & Iron Company from 1939 to 1967. The Chateaugay mine was one of the deepest commercial iron ore mines in the United States, with stopes as much as 3,500 feet (1,100 m) below the surface. Lyon Mountain's iron ore was considered the best in the industry and was the material of choice for John Roebling and Sons in the construction of the Brooklyn Bridge. In later years, Roebling used Lyon Mountain ore in the construction of the George Washington Bridge and the Golden Gate Bridge.

== Government ==
Lyon Mountain is a hamlet within the town of Dannemora. Public services and government affairs are administered by the town, which is governed by a board of councilors.

== Education ==
The census-designated place is within the Northern Adirondack Central School District.

== Sports ==
Japan Islanders are a team with the Empire Professional Baseball League and play out of Lyon Mountain Miners Baseball Field.

== See also ==
- Lyon Mountain Railroad Station
