= Lyon Mountain station =

Historic train station located at Lyon Mountain, Clinton County, New York, U.S.

Lyon Mountain
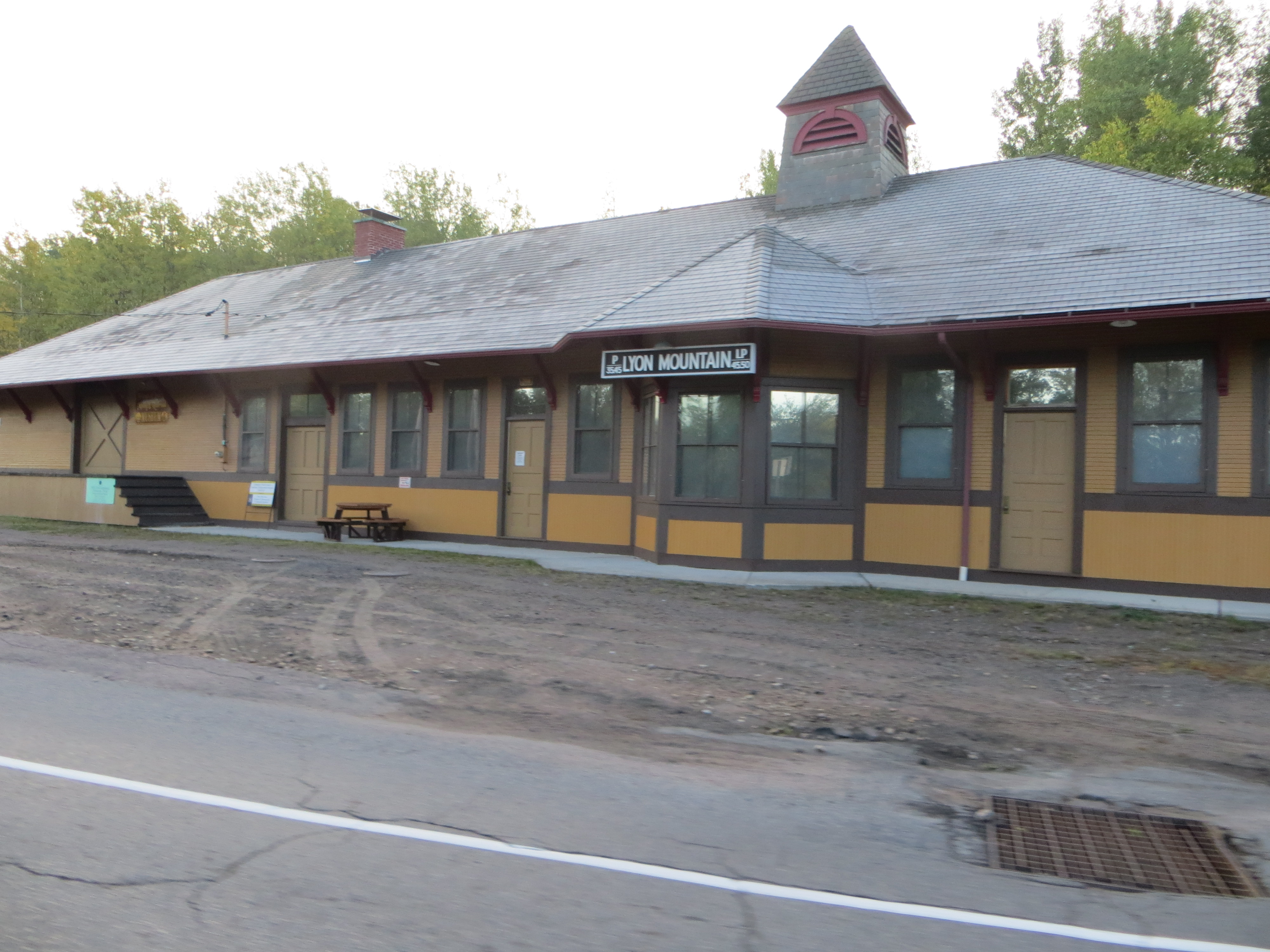

General information
- Location: 2914 First Street, Lyon Mountain, New York

Former services
Preceding station	Delaware and Hudson Railway	Following station
Standish toward Lake Placid	Champlain – Lake Placid	Chazy Lake toward Champlain
- Lyon Mountain Railroad Station
- U.S. National Register of Historic Places
- Location within New York Location within the United States
- Location: 2914 First Street, Lyon Mountain, New York
- Coordinates: 44°43′35″N 73°54′39″W
- Area: less than one acre
- Built: 1903
- Architectural style: Late Victorian
- NRHP reference No.: 02000005
- Added to NRHP: February 14, 2002
Location

Lyon Mountain station is a historic train station located at Lyon Mountain, Clinton County, New York. The station was built by the Delaware and Hudson Railway in 1903, and is a long one-story, rectangular, wood-frame building with Late Victorian style design elements. It has a hipped roof with wide overhanging eaves and topped by a cupola with a pyramidal roof. The station remained in use until 1949–1950, and later used as a post office and tavern. It is now a museum.

It was added to the National Register of Historic Places on February 14, 2002, as the Lyon Mountain Railroad Station.

== See also ==
- National Register of Historic Places listings in Clinton County, New York
