= Werrenrath Camp =

- U.S. National Register of Historic Places
- Location within New York Location within the United States
- Location: 55 Island Dr., Dannemora, New York
- Coordinates: 44°45′19″N 73°48′05″W
- Area: 8.5 acres (3.4 ha)
- Built: 1928
- Architect: Moses, Lionel
- Architectural style: Shingle Style; Tudor Revival; Arts and Crafts
- NRHP reference No.: 10000943
- Added to NRHP: November 29, 2010

Werrenrath Camp is a historic Great Camp located in Dannemora in Clinton County, New York. It was built in 1928 for opera singer Reinald Werrenrath (1883–1953) as a summer estate. The property includes the main house, a boathouse, an ice house, and two stone gate posts. The main house is a two-story, rectangular, limestone sheathed dwelling measuring approximately 37 feet wide and 61 feet long. The interior has Shingle Style, Tudor Revival, and Arts and Crafts style design elements.

It was listed on the National Register of Historic Places in 2010.
