= Heyworth–Mason Industrial Building =

- U.S. National Register of Historic Places
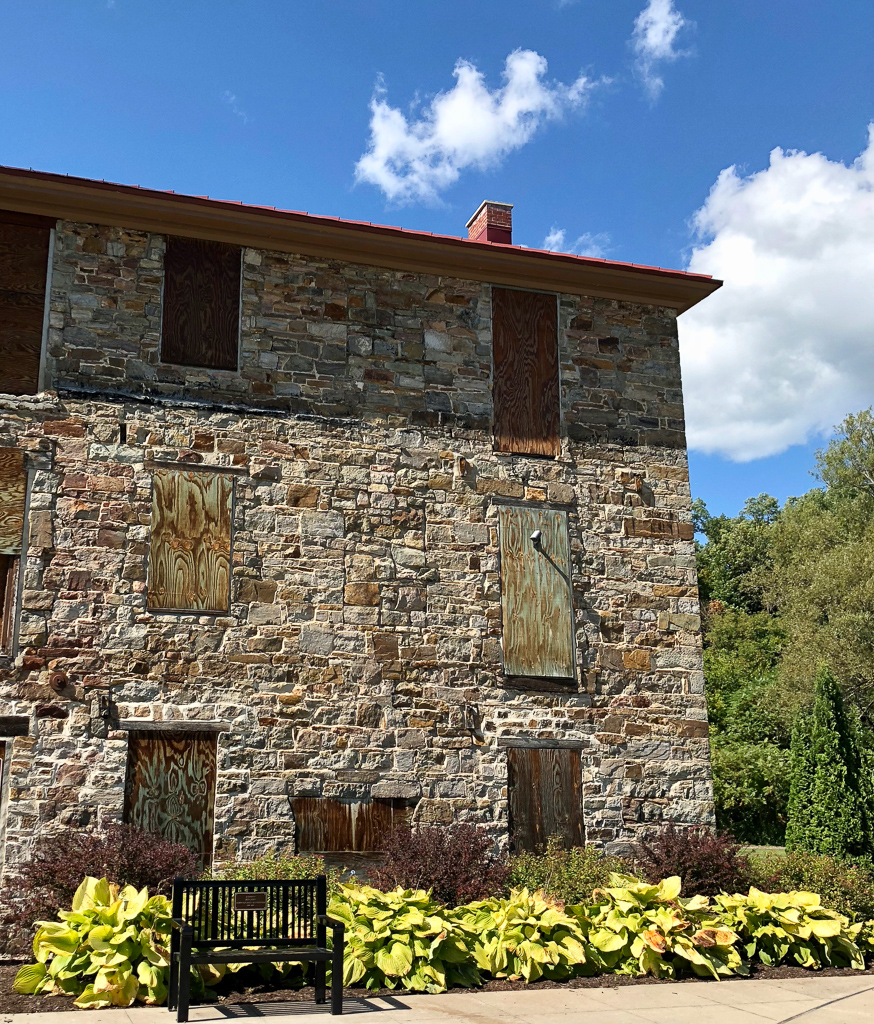

- Location within New York Location within the United States
- Location: Mason Hill Road, Peru, New York
- Coordinates: 44°34′44″N 73°31′28″W
- Area: 1.89 acres (0.76 ha)
- Built: 1836
- NRHP reference No.: 11000250
- Added to NRHP: May 6, 2011

Heyworth–Mason Industrial Building is a historic factory located in Peru, Clinton County, New York. It was built in 1836, and is a three-story, seven-bay, rectangular, sandstone building measuring 35 feet wide and 60 feet long. It has a gable roof and interior end chimneys. It originally housed a factory and later storage. It was converted to apartments in the 1970s.

It was listed on the National Register of Historic Places in 2011.
