= First Presbyterian Church (Plattsburgh, New York) =

Historic church in New York, United States

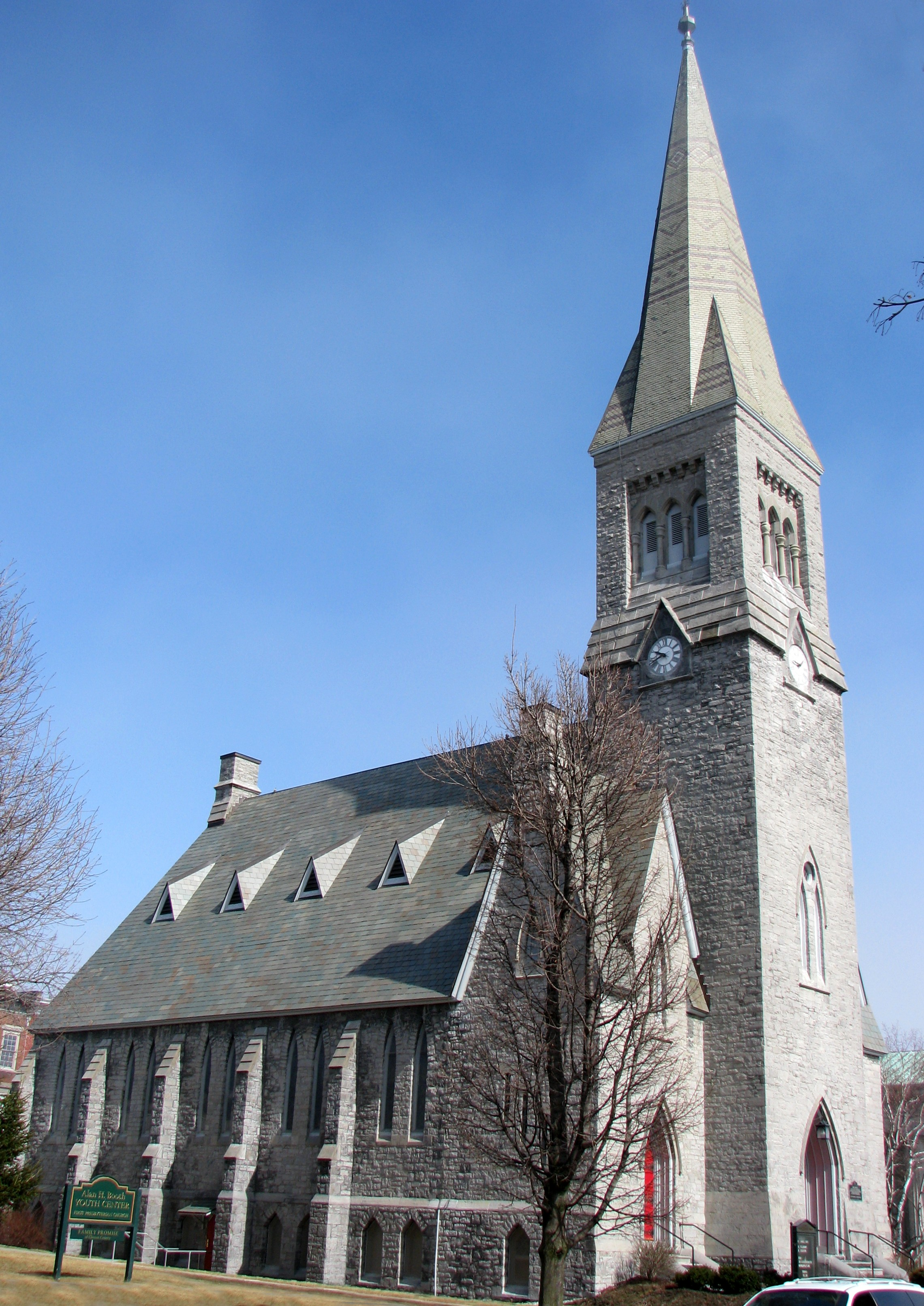
- First Presbyterian Church
- Location: 34 Brinkerhoff St., Plattsburgh, New York
- First Presbyterian Church
- U.S. National Register of Historic Places
- Location within New York Location within the United States
- Coordinates: 44°41′50″N 73°27′16″W
- Area: less than one acre
- Built: 1812-1816, rebuilt 1868-1873
- Architect: Frederick W. Brown
- Architectural style: Gothic
- MPS: Plattsburgh City MRA
- NRHP reference No.: 82001104
- Added to NRHP: November 12, 1982

First Presbyterian Church is a historic Presbyterian church located at 34 Brinkerhoff Street in Plattsburgh, Clinton County, New York. It was originally built between 1812 and 1816; after a fire destroyed the structure in 1867, it was rebuilt in the same location between 1868 and 1873. It is a rectangular limestone Gothic Revival style church. It has a slate gable roof and buttresses. It features arched openings and a central square bell tower with tall spire and embedded clocks on each side.

The congregation officially formed in 1797, after having met since at least 1792. The building was added to the National Register of Historic Places in 1982.

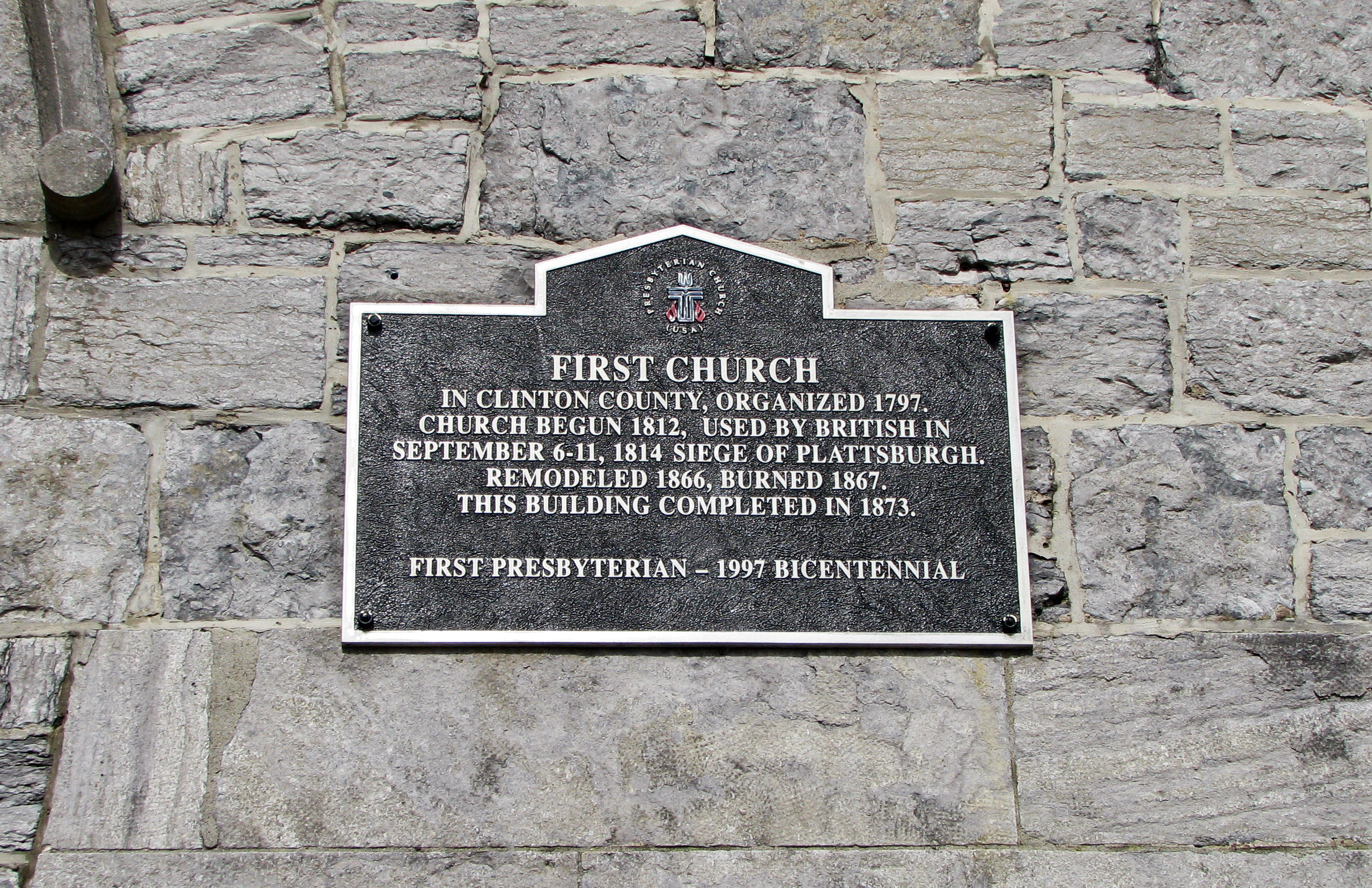
Plaque on the side of the Church
