= United States Oval Historic District =

Historic district in New York, United States

- U.S. National Register of Historic Places
- U.S. Historic district
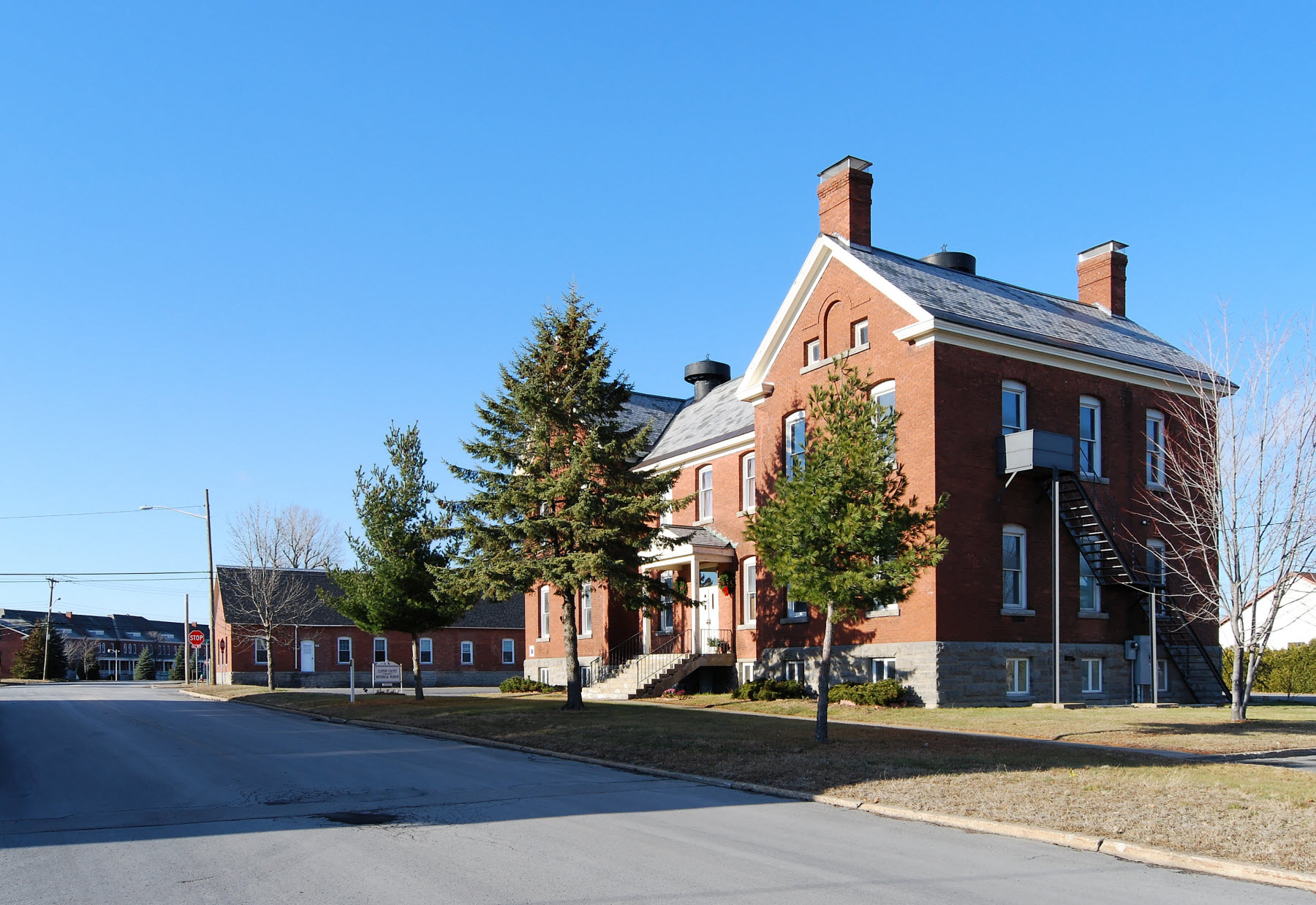
- United States Oval Historic District, 2008

- Location within New York Location within the United States
- Location: Plattsburgh Air Force Base, Plattsburgh, New York
- Coordinates: 44°41′11″N 73°26′53″W
- Area: 53 acres (21 ha)
- Built: 1893
- Architect: US Army
- MPS: Plattsburgh City MRA
- NRHP reference No.: 85003766
- Added to NRHP: August 30, 1989

United States Oval Historic District is a national historic district located on Plattsburgh Air Force Base at Plattsburgh in Clinton County, New York. The district includes 26 contributing buildings and one contributing structure. The district consists of post headquarters, barracks, officers' quarters, a hospital, a chapel, and various buildings surrounding a broad parade ground. All were built between 1893 and 1934 by the U.S. Army as components of the former Plattsburgh Barracks.

It was added to the National Register of Historic Places in 1989.
