= Z. Ritchie House =

Historic house in New York, United States

- U.S. National Register of Historic Places
- Location within New York Location within the United States
- Location: 26 S. Catherine St., Plattsburgh, New York
- Coordinates: 44°42′2″N 73°27′27″W
- Area: less than one acre
- Built: 1856
- Architectural style: Gothic Revival
- MPS: Plattsburgh City MRA
- NRHP reference No.: 82001111
- Added to NRHP: November 12, 1982

Z. Ritchie House is a historic home located at Plattsburgh in Clinton County, New York. It was built between 1856 and 1869 and is a two-story, frame dwelling on a stone foundation in the Gothic Revival style. It features a cross-gable roof, decorative bargeboards, and a one-story projecting bay with ornate balustrade.

It was listed on the National Register of Historic Places in 1982.
