= Miller Homestead (Pea Ridge, Arkansas) =

Historic house in Arkansas, United States

- U.S. National Register of Historic Places
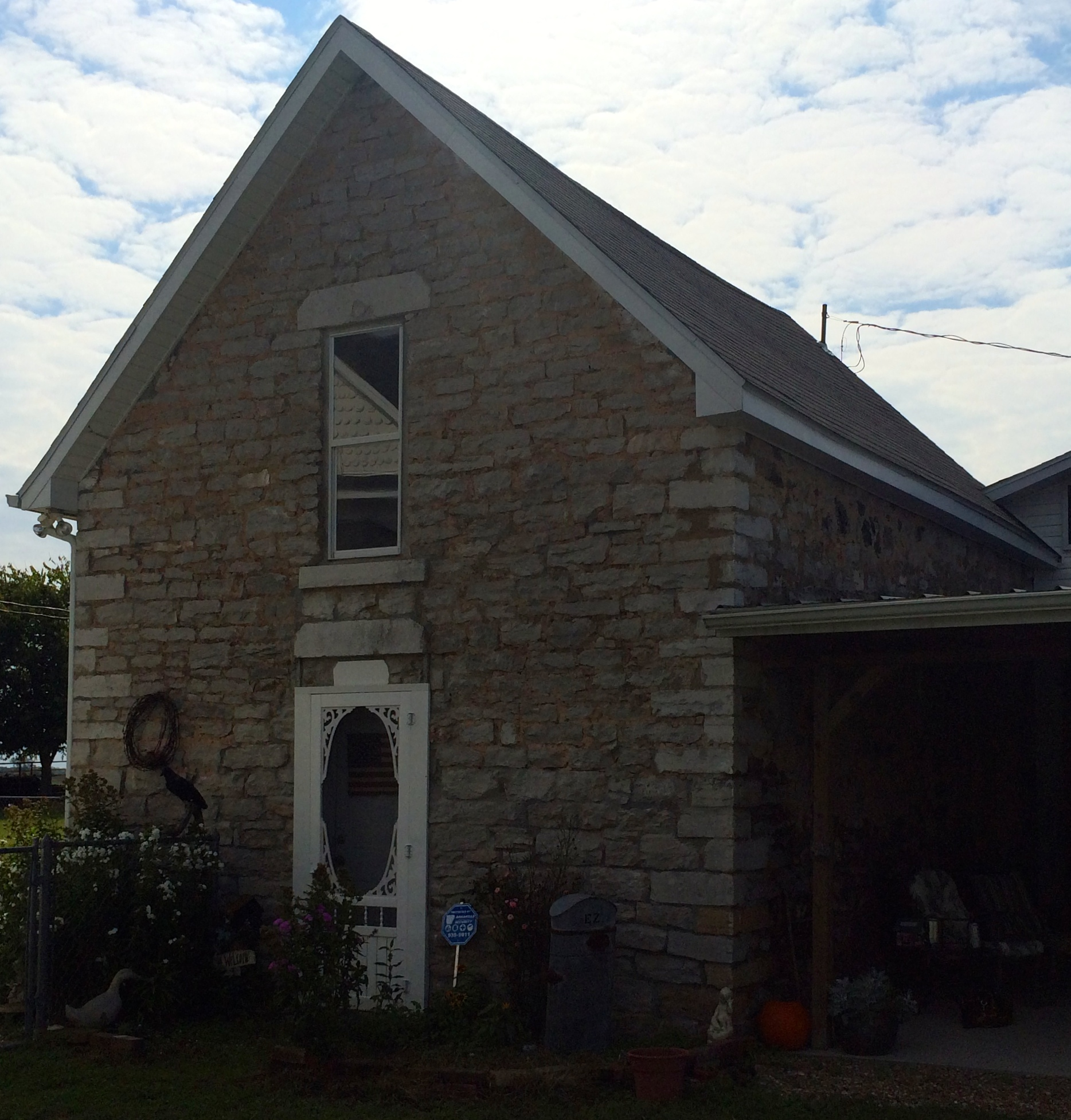

- Location within Arkansas Location within the United States
- Location: 1/2 mi. E of AR 94, Pea Ridge, Arkansas
- Coordinates: 36°26′29″N 94°6′17″W
- Built: 1907
- MPS: Benton County MRA
- NRHP reference No.: 87002362
- Added to NRHP: January 28, 1988

The Miller Homestead is a historic house on Benton County Route 64 (Lee Town Road) in Pea Ridge, Arkansas. It is a 1 1/2-story wood-frame structure, with the asymmetrical massing and wraparound porch characteristic of Late Victorian houses. It was built c. 1907, and is a relatively sophisticated architectural expression for its rural setting. The property also includes a c. 1890 stone smokehouse.

The property was listed on the National Register of Historic Places in 1988.

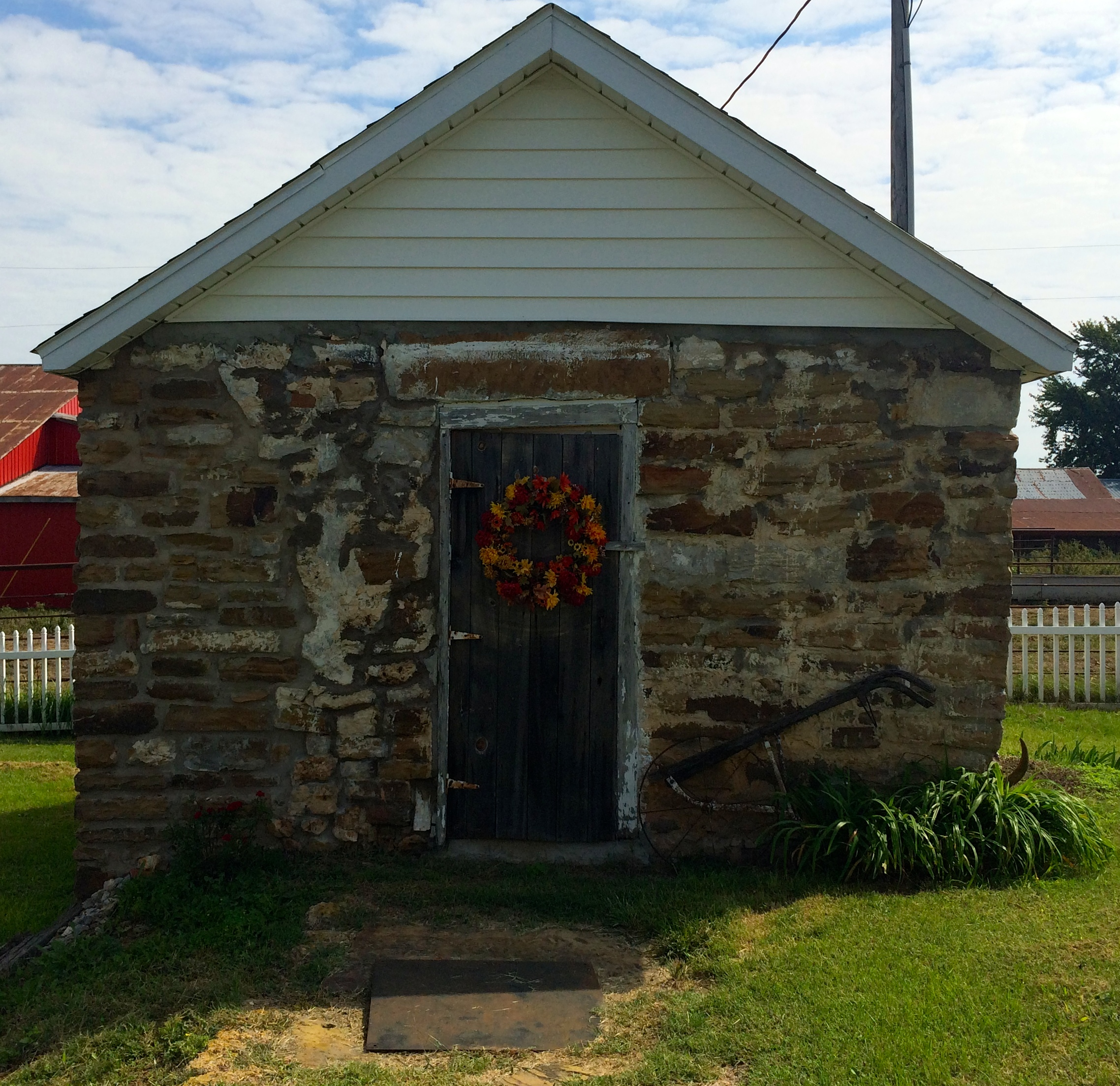
Smokehouse at the homestead

== See also ==
- National Register of Historic Places listings in Benton County, Arkansas
