= Hartwell House (Reading, Massachusetts) =

Historic house in Massachusetts, United States

- U.S. National Register of Historic Places
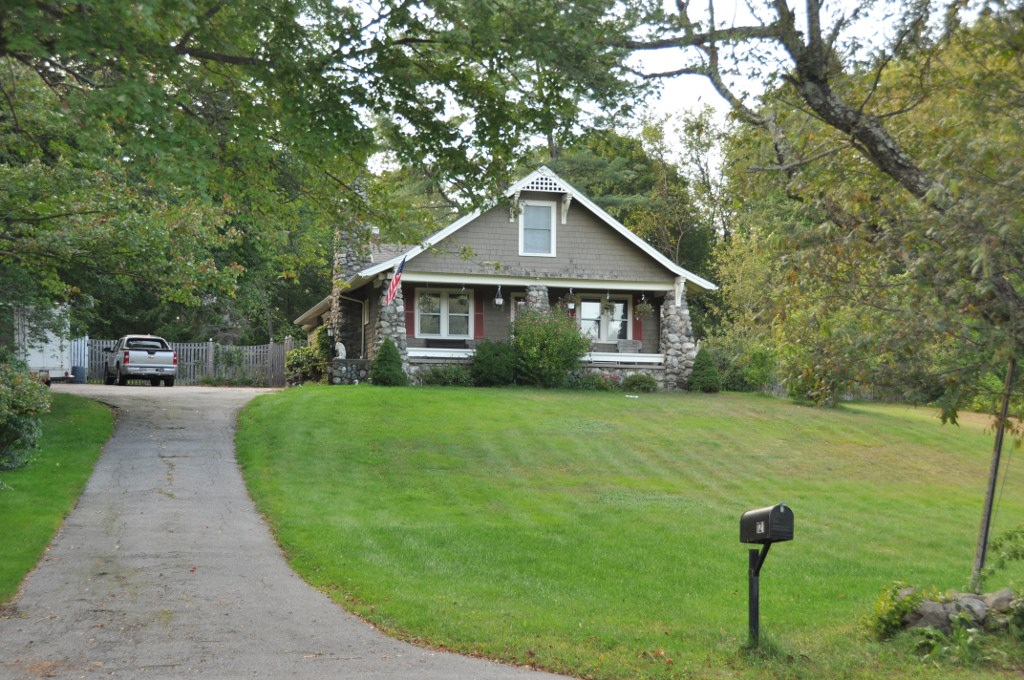

- Location within Massachusetts Location within the United States
- Location: 121 Willow Street, Reading, Massachusetts
- Coordinates: 42°31′49″N 71°7′25″W
- Built: 1918
- Architectural style: Bungalow/Craftsman
- MPS: Reading MRA
- NRHP reference No.: 84002635
- Added to NRHP: July 19, 1984

The Hartwell House is a historic house in Reading, Massachusetts. The 1 1/2-story wood-frame house was built in 1918 for George Hartwell, an engineer. The most prominent feature of this Craftsman/Bungalow style house is its stonework: the front porch is supported by tapering piers of fieldstone, and the full length of its chimney is similarly composed. There is a decorative woodwork trellis at the peak of the front gable.

The house was listed on the National Register of Historic Places in 1984.

== See also ==
- National Register of Historic Places listings in Reading, Massachusetts
- National Register of Historic Places listings in Middlesex County, Massachusetts
