= J.K. Miller Homestead =

Historic house in Montana, United States

- Miller, J.K., Homestead
- U.S. National Register of Historic Places
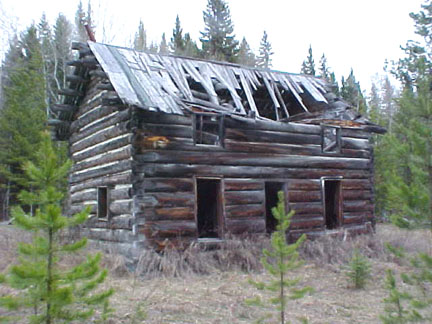

- Location within Montana Location within the United States
- Nearest city: Big Prairie, Montana
- Coordinates: 48°50′11″N 114°19′44″W
- Area: 7 acres (2.8 ha)
- Built: 1909
- Architect: Miller, J.K.
- MPS: Settlement on the North Fork of the Flathead River, Glacier National Park TR
- NRHP reference No.: 88001092
- Added to NRHP: July 21, 1988

The J.K. Miller Homestead in Glacier National Park near Big Prairie, Montana, United States, was built in 1909. It was listed on the National Register of Historic Places in 1988. The listing included three contributing buildings and one other contributing structure.

According to a 1986 report, the homestead is "a well preserved historic homestead complex, despite its abandonment since the 1930s."

It includes a large, dovetail-notched, log privy that "is notable for its craftsmanship and good preservation" and an "outstanding" 34 feet (10 m) by 34 feet (10 m) log horse barn.
