= S. F. Vilas Home for Aged & Infirmed Ladies =

- U.S. National Register of Historic Places
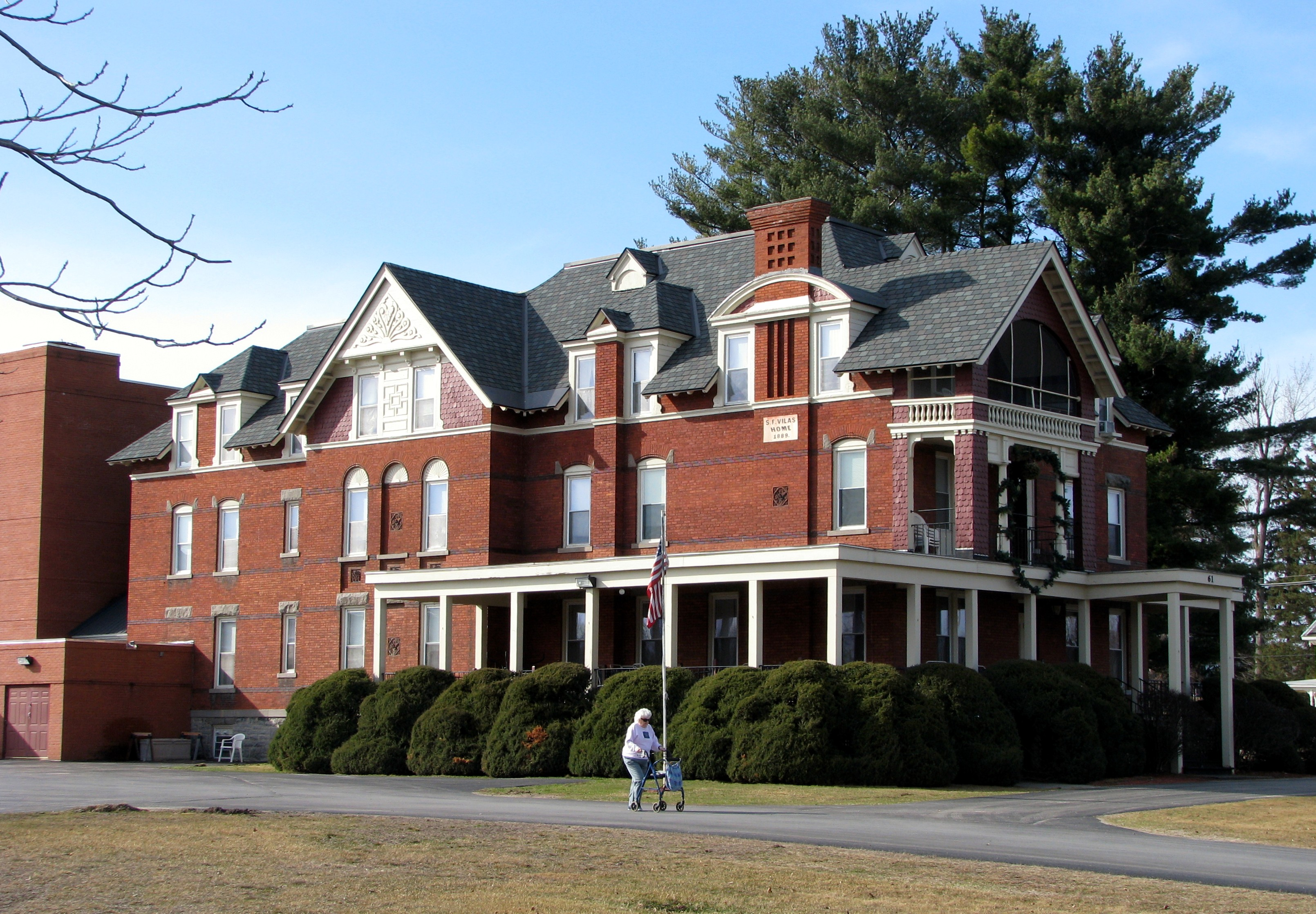
- S. F. Vilas Home for Aged & Infirmed Ladies, March 2012

- Location within New York Location within the United States
- Location: Beekman and Cornelia Sts., Plattsburgh, New York
- Coordinates: 44°41′56″N 73°28′2″W
- Area: 3.4 acres (1.4 ha)
- Built: 1889
- Architect: Cummings, Marcus Frederick
- Architectural style: Queen Anne
- MPS: Plattsburgh City MRA
- NRHP reference No.: 82001113
- Added to NRHP: November 12, 1982

S. F. Vilas Home for Aged & Infirmed Ladies is a historic multiple dwelling located at Plattsburgh in Clinton County, New York. It was built in 1889-1890 and is a three-story, brick, monumental multiple dwelling structure in the Queen Anne style. It features truncated hipped roofs with cross-gable wings, corbelled decorative chimneys, and bands of colored brickwork. It was built as a 44-bed residence for aged and infirmed women. It was listed on the National Register of Historic Places in 1982.
