= Pike's Cantonment Site =

- U.S. National Register of Historic Places
- Location: Address Restricted, near Plattsburgh, New York
- Built: 1812
- NRHP reference No.: 13000304
- Added to NRHP: May 22, 2013

Pike's Cantonment Site is a historic archaeological site located near Plattsburgh, in Platssburgh Township, Clinton County, New York. It was located in 2011 during an archaeological dig that uncovered a bayonet scabbard, ammunition, military jacket buttons, building sites, and burned timber. Pike's Cantonment was the location of a military encampment during the War of 1812 under the command of Zebulon Pike. It was established in the winter of 1812-1813 for 2,000 American soldiers and burned to the ground by British troops during the summer of 1813. On September 11, 1814, during the Battle of Plattsburgh, the cantonment was utilized by British troops as a spot to cross the Saranac River as they attempted to circle American soldiers defending Plattsburgh.

It was listed on the National Register of Historic Places in 2012.
