= George H. Hartwell House =

Historic house in Massachusetts, United States

- U.S. National Register of Historic Places
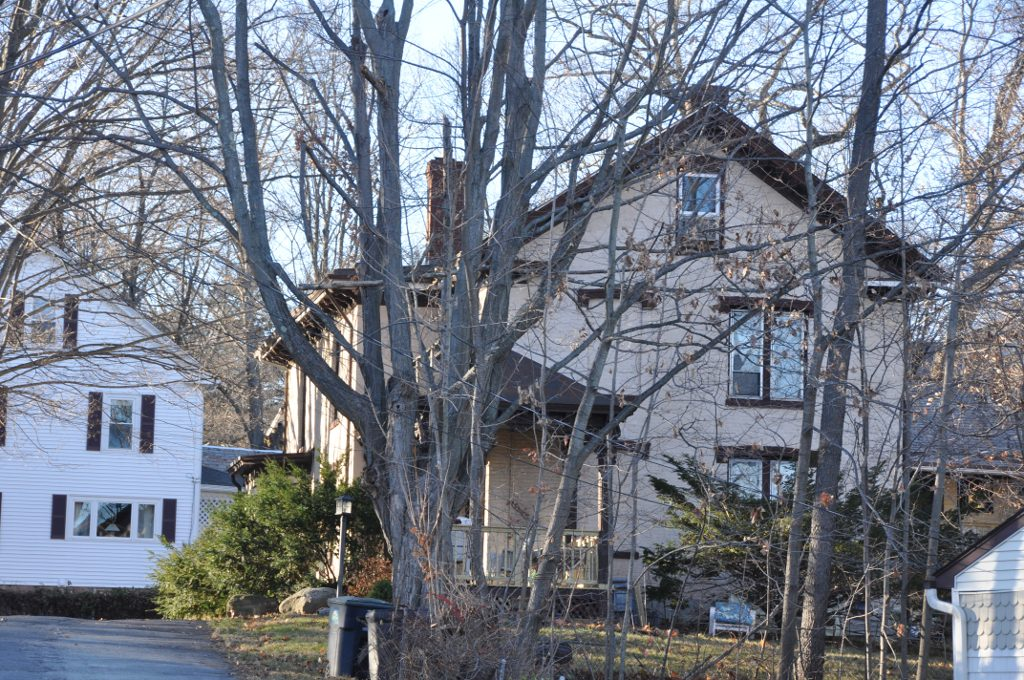

- Location within Massachusetts Location within the United States
- Location: 105 Hamilton St., Southbridge, Massachusetts
- Coordinates: 42°4′39″N 72°2′8″W
- Architectural style: Italianate
- MPS: Southbridge MRA
- NRHP reference No.: 89000556
- Added to NRHP: June 22, 1989

The George H. Hartwell House is a historic house at 105 Hamilton Street in Southbridge, Massachusetts. It is a rare example of a modest vernacular Italianate house in Southbridge, and one of the only ones built of brick. It was built in the 1850s, not long after that stretch of Hamilton Street was laid out, for Dr. George Hartwell, nephew of Dr. Samuel Hartwell. The Hartwells controlled the Hartwell Block on Main Street, and George Hartwell ran a pharmacy, which continued in business into the 1970s. While the house has significant Italianate features such as bracketed eaves and paired windows, it lacks the flat roof line that is characteristic of other local Italianate houses, and is less massive than the more imposing James Gleason House and Chamberlain-Bordeau House.

The house was listed on the National Register of Historic Places in 1989.

== See also ==
- National Register of Historic Places listings in Southbridge, Massachusetts
- National Register of Historic Places listings in Worcester County, Massachusetts
