= Peru Community Church =

Historic church in New York, United States

- U.S. National Register of Historic Places
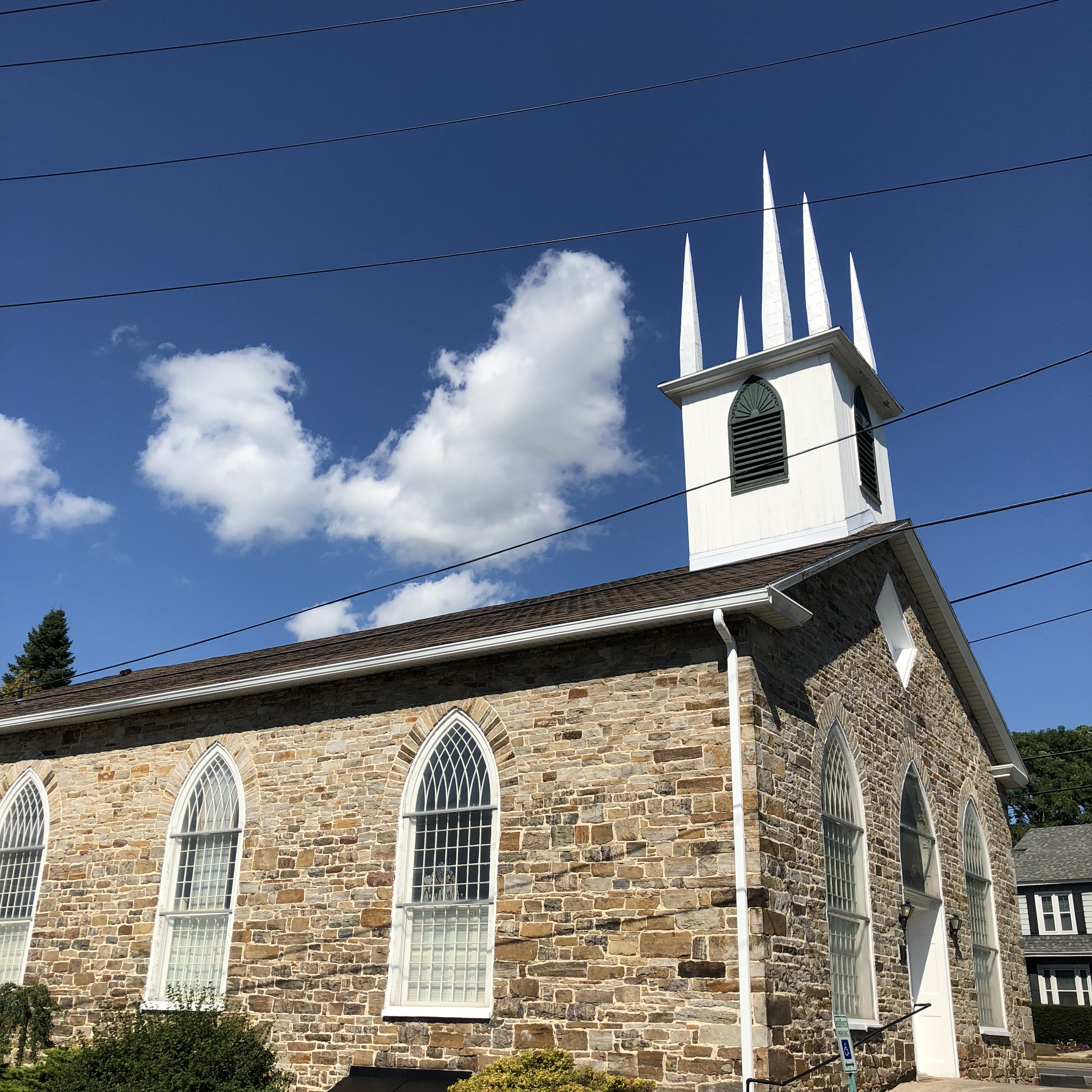

- Location within New York Location within the United States
- Location: 12 Elm St. Peru, New York
- Coordinates: 44°34′43″N 73°31′40″W
- Area: 0 acres (0 ha)
- Built: 1833
- Built by: Robert S. York
- Architectural style: Gothic Revival
- NRHP reference No.: 01000054
- Added to NRHP: February 2, 2001

Peru Community Church, also known as Peru Congregational Church, is a historic church located in Peru, Clinton County, New York. It was built in 1833, and is a rectangular sandstone Gothic Revival style church. It has a gable roof and center entrance tower with pointed arched openings, belfry, and wood frame steeple. A two-story social hall was added in 1949.

It was added to the National Register of Historic Places in 2001.
