= Winslow–Turner Carriage House =

- U.S. National Register of Historic Places
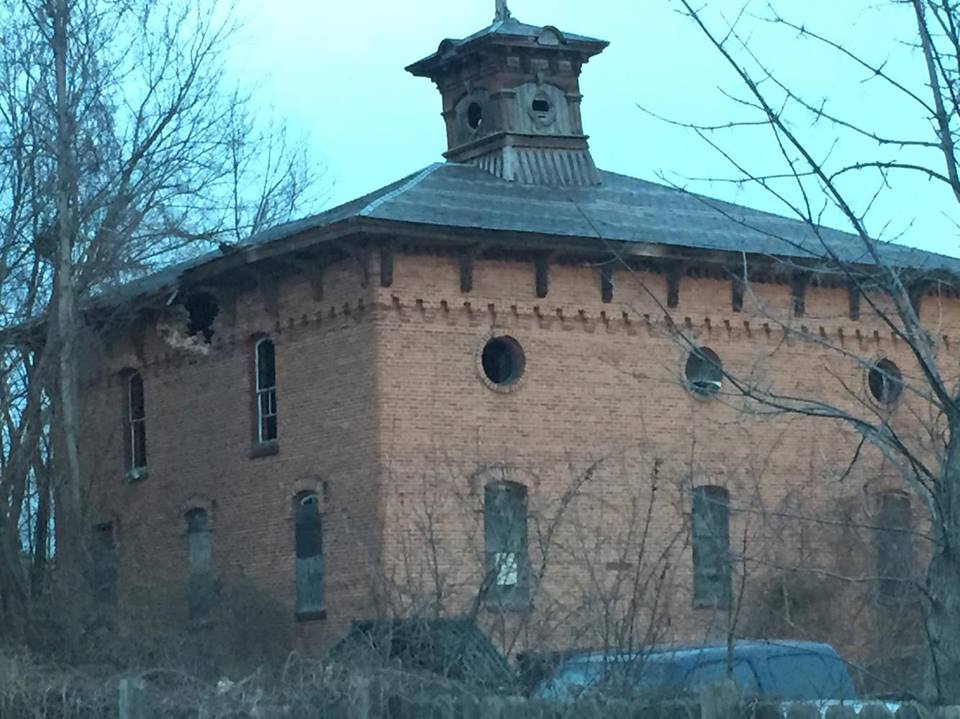

- Location within New York Location within the United States
- Location: 210 Cornelia St., Plattsburgh, New York
- Coordinates: 44°41′56″N 73°28′28″W
- Area: less than one acre
- Built: 1876
- MPS: Plattsburgh City MRA
- NRHP reference No.: 82001114
- Added to NRHP: November 12, 1982

The Winslow–Turner Carriage House was a historic carriage house located at Plattsburgh in Clinton County, New York. It was built about 1876 and was a 2-story rectangular building on a stone foundation with a 1 1/2-story north wing. The residence it was associated with was demolished in 1977. The carriage house itself was allowed to fall into extreme disrepair and was torn down by its owner in 2020.

It had been listed on the National Register of Historic Places in 1982.
