= W. G. Wilcox House =

- U.S. National Register of Historic Places
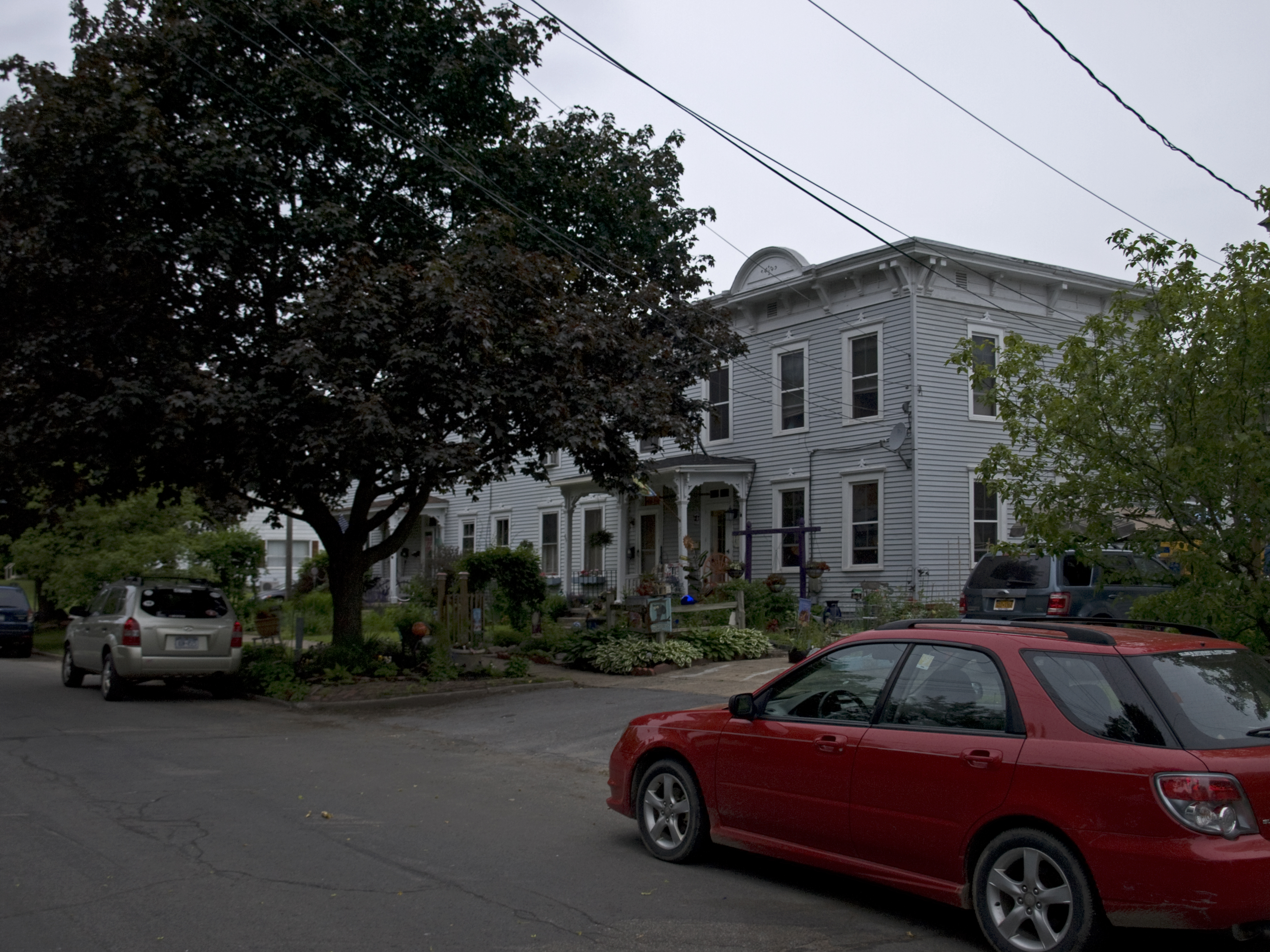
- W. G. Wilcox House, June 2013

- Location within New York Location within the United States
- Location: 45-51 Lorraine St., Plattsburgh, New York
- Coordinates: 44°42′8″N 73°26′52″W
- Area: less than one acre
- Built: 1888
- Architectural style: Stick/Eastlake
- MPS: Plattsburgh City MRA
- NRHP reference No.: 83001667
- Added to NRHP: February 24, 1983

W. G. Wilcox House is a historic multiple dwelling located at Plattsburgh in Clinton County, New York. It was built about 1888 and is a two-story, rectangular multiple dwelling structure with a flat roof on a stone foundation. It features elaborate Eastlake detailing.

It was listed on the National Register of Historic Places in 1982.
