= Lyon Street School =

- U.S. National Register of Historic Places
- Location within New York Location within the United States
- Location: Jct. of Rock & Lyons Rds., Peru, New York
- Coordinates: 44.60687°N 73.45943°W
- Area: 1.89 acres (0.76 ha)
- Built: c. 1880
- Architectural style: Late Victorian
- NRHP reference No.: 13000304
- Added to NRHP: May 22, 2013

Lyon Street School, also known as Peru District School No. 4, is a historic one-room school building located in Peru, Clinton County, New York. It was built about 1880, and is a one-story, wood-frame building measuring 24 feet wide and 35 feet long with Late Victorian style design elements. It has a front gable roof with overhanging eaves and topped by an open, hip roofed belfry. The school closed in 1938.

It was listed on the National Register of Historic Places in 2013.
