= House at 56 Cornelia Street =

Historic house in New York, United States

- U.S. National Register of Historic Places
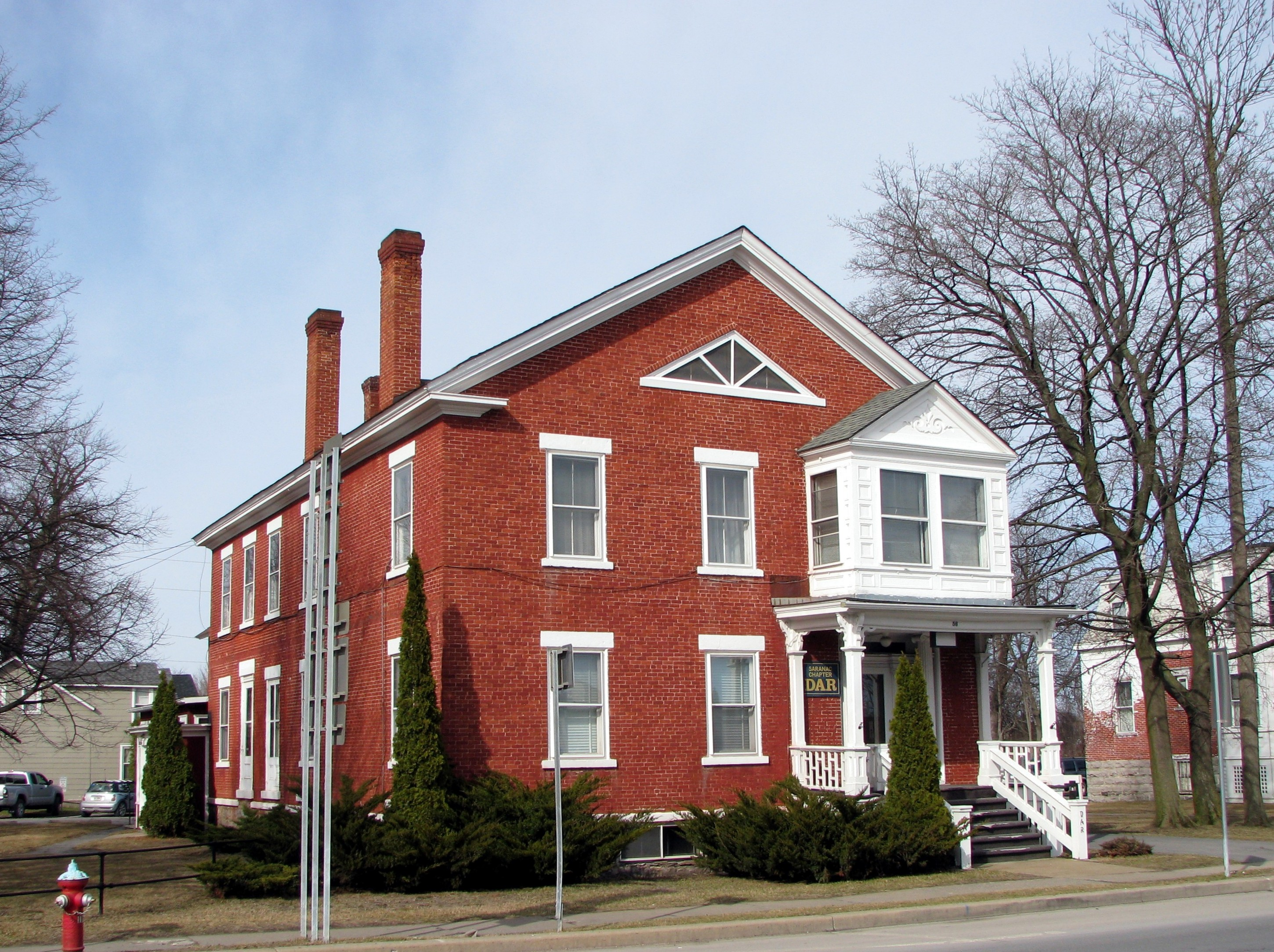
- House at 56 Cornelia Street

- Location within New York Location within the United States
- Interactive map showing the location of the House at 56 Cornelia Street
- Location: 56 Cornelia St., Plattsburgh, New York
- Coordinates: 44°41′58″N 73°27′9″W
- Area: less than one acre
- Built: 1850
- MPS: Plattsburgh City MRA
- NRHP reference No.: 82001107
- Added to NRHP: November 12, 1982

House at 56 Cornelia Street is a historic home located at Plattsburgh in Clinton County, New York. It was built in about 1850 and is a two-story, rectangular building on a stone foundation. It features a porch with a moulded cornice and decorative brackets.

It was listed on the National Register of Historic Places in 1982.
