= W. W. Hartwell House & Dependencies =

Historic house in New York, United States

- U.S. National Register of Historic Places
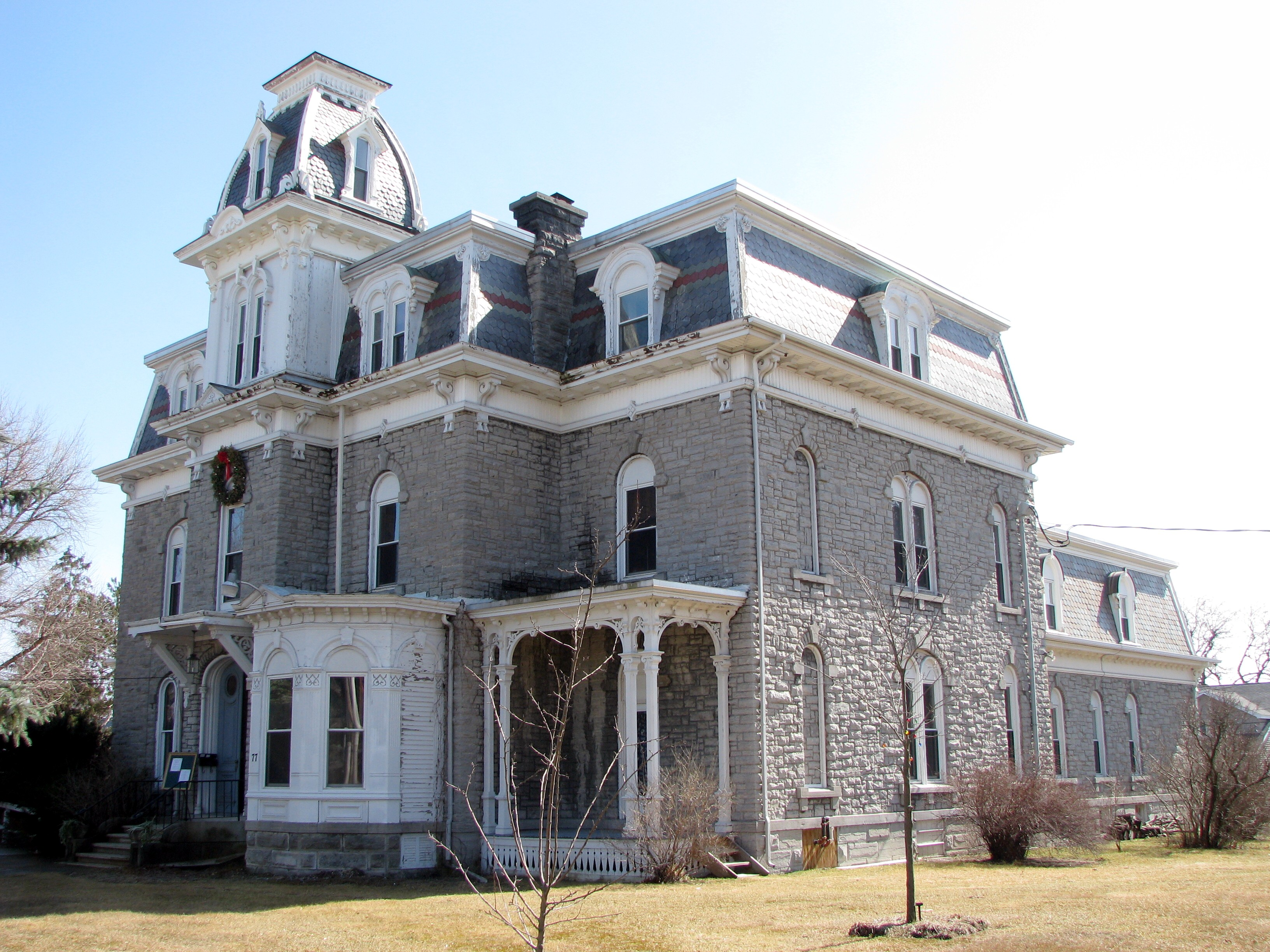
- W. W. Hartwell House, March 2012

- Location within New York Location within the United States
- Location: 77 Brinkerhoff St., Plattsburgh, New York
- Coordinates: 44°41′47″N 73°27′32″W
- Area: 1.9 acres (0.77 ha)
- Built: 1870
- Architectural style: Colonial Revival, Second Empire
- MPS: Plattsburgh City MRA
- NRHP reference No.: 82001105
- Added to NRHP: November 12, 1982

W. W. Hartwell House & Dependencies, also known as Regina Maria Retreat House, is a historic home located at Plattsburgh in Clinton County, New York. It was built about 1870 and is an elaborate stone mansion featuring a three-story tower with a Mansard roof in the Second Empire style. The house is set among park-like landscaping. Also on the property are a cottage and a stone carriage house.

It was listed on the National Register of Historic Places in 1982.
