= Miller Homestead (Au Sable, New York) =

Historic house in New York, United States

- U.S. National Register of Historic Places
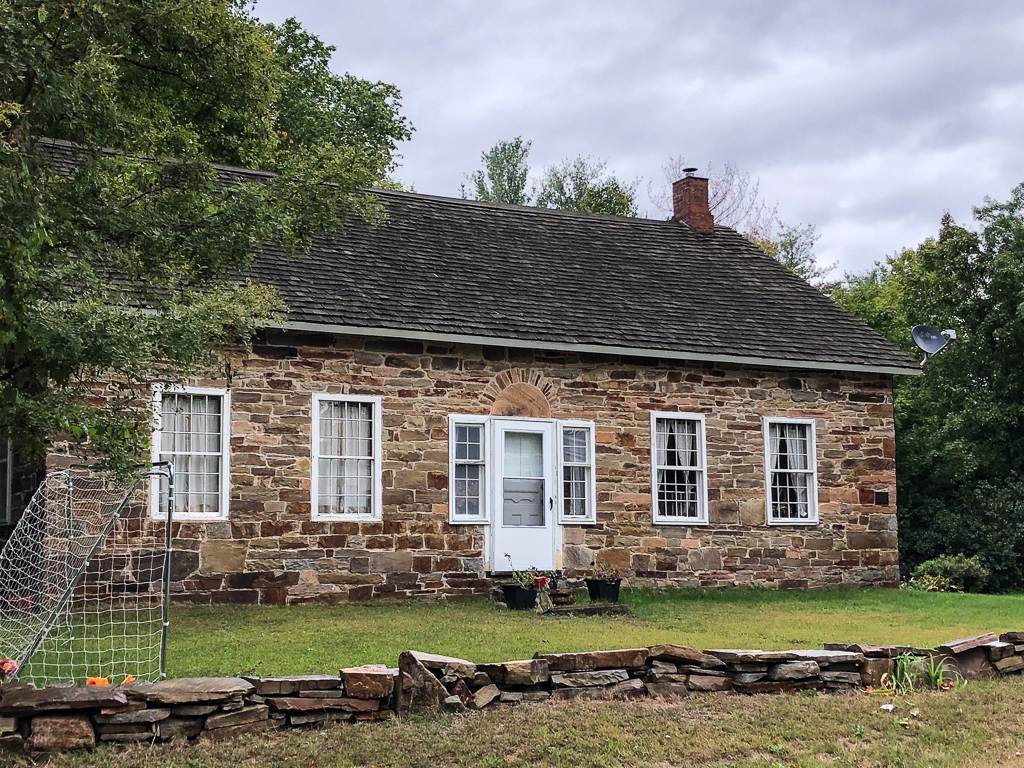

- Location within New York Location within the United States
- Location: 664 Hallock Hill Rd., Au Sable, New York
- Coordinates: 44°31′26″N 73°33′40″W
- Area: 80 acres (32 ha)
- Built: 1822
- Architect: Miller, Thomas
- Architectural style: Federal
- NRHP reference No.: 99000910
- Added to NRHP: July 28, 1999

Miller Homestead is a historic home located at Au Sable in Clinton County, New York. The house was built in 1822 and is a 1 1/2-story stone dwelling. It is a five-by-two-bay, side-gabled Federal-style structure. Also on the property is the foundation remains of a large 19th-century barn and a stone wall. It is open as a local history museum.

It was listed on the National Register of Historic Places in 1999.
