= D'Youville Academy =

Historic place in New York, United States

- U.S. National Register of Historic Places
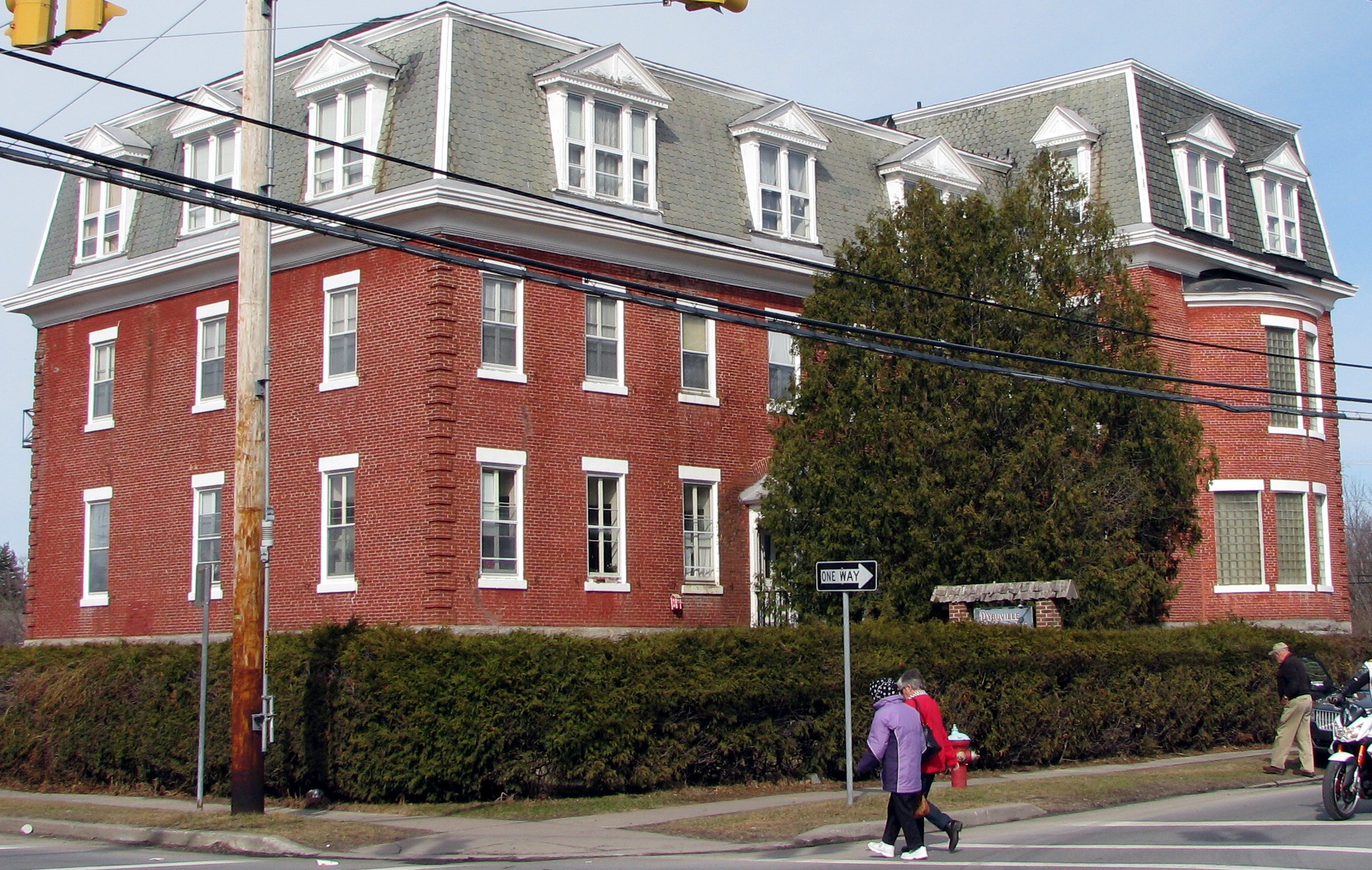
- D'Youville Academy, March 2012

- Location within New York Location within the United States
- Location: 100 Cornelia St., Plattsburgh, New York
- Coordinates: 44°41′58″N 73°27′28″W
- Area: 2 acres (0.81 ha)
- Built: ca. 1878
- MPS: Plattsburgh City MRA
- NRHP reference No.: 82001103
- Added to NRHP: November 12, 1982

D'Youville Academy is a historic school building and nunnery in Plattsburgh in Clinton County, New York. It was built about 1878 and is a 2 1/2-story, cruciform plan brick structure on a raised stone foundation. The facade features a rounded 2-story bay, a five-gable roof dormer, and Mansard roof. The Academy was founded about 1878 and operated by the Grey Nuns, founded by Saint Marie-Marguerite d'Youville (1701-1771). The Academy has since been folded into the Seton Catholic Central High School, and the building has since been converted into apartments.

It was listed on the National Register of Historic Places in 1982.
