= Dannemora, New York =

- Town
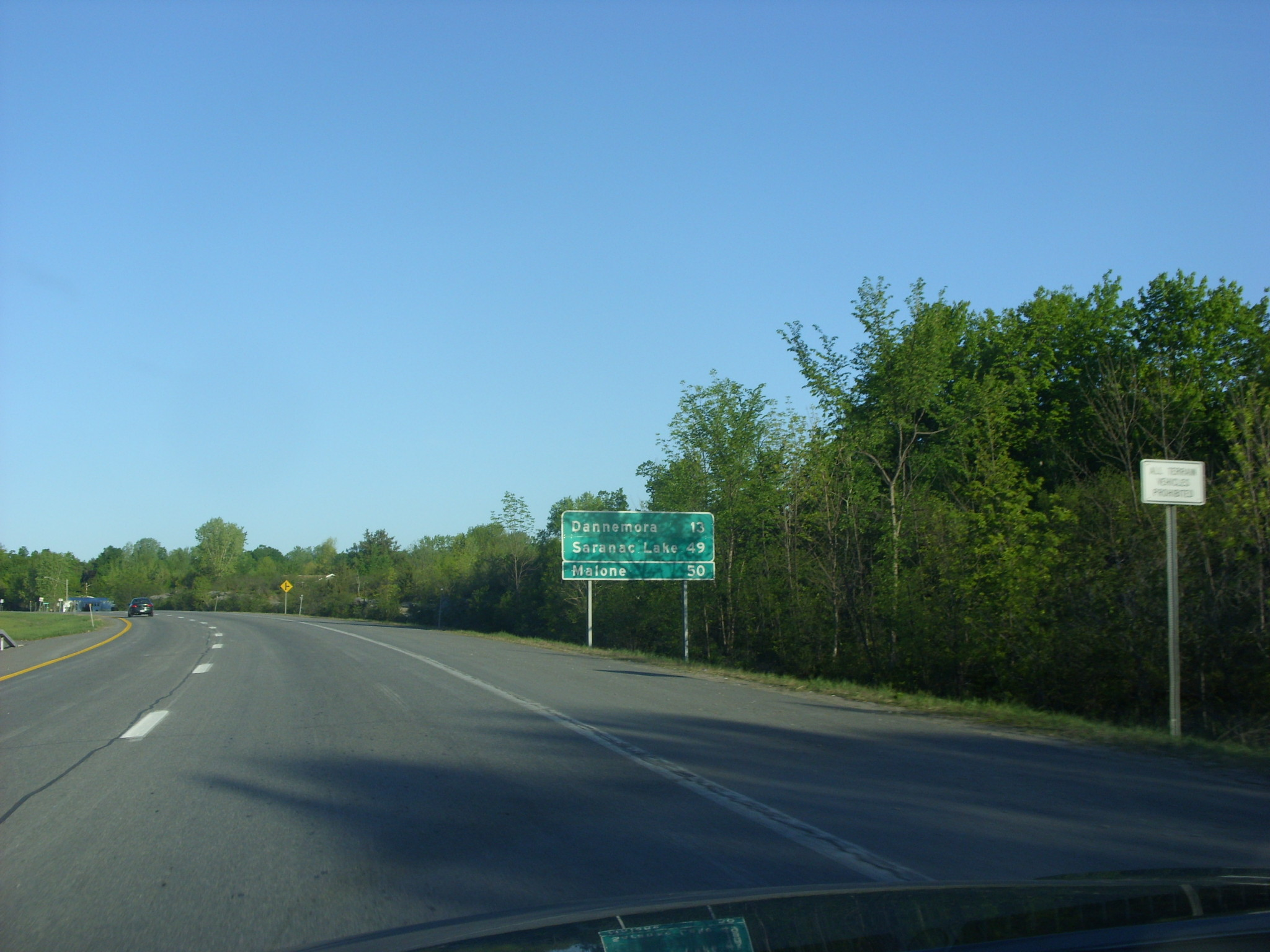
- NY 374, with sign for Dannemora

- Location in Clinton County and the state of New York.
- Coordinates: 44°44′24″N 73°49′33″W
- Country: United States
- State: New York
- Counties: Clinton

Government
  - Type: Town Council
  - Town Supervisor: Raymond "Joey" Varin Jr (R)
  - Town Council: Members: Michael Tolosky (R); • James W. Barber (D); • Jason Carter (R); • Deborah Coryer (D)

Area
  - Total: 65.84 sq mi (170.52 km^{2})
  - Land: 59.08 sq mi (153.02 km^{2})
  - Water: 6.76 sq mi (17.51 km^{2})
- Elevation: 1,439 ft (439 m)

Population (2020)
  - Total: 4,037
- Time zone: UTC−5 (Eastern (EST))
  - Summer (DST): UTC−4 (EDT)
- ZIP Codes: 12929 (Dannemora); 12952 (Lyon Mountain); 12955 (Lyon Mountain); 12918 (Cadyville); 12935 (Ellenburg Depot); 12962 (Morrisonville)
- Area code: 518
- FIPS code: 36-019-19653
- GNIS feature ID: 978883
- Website: www.townofdannemora.gov

Dannemora is a town in Clinton County, New York, United States. The population was 4,037 at the 2020 census, down from 4,898 in 2010. The town is named after Dannemora, Sweden, an important iron-mining region.

The town of Dannemora is on the western border of Clinton County, west of Plattsburgh. It contains a village also called Dannemora, the southern portion of which is located in the town of Saranac.

== History ==
The area was first colonized circa 1838. Clinton Correctional Facility was opened in the area in 1845, so as to utilize the prisoners in local mining operations. The town of Dannemora was formed in 1854 from the town of Beekmantown.

== Geography ==
According to the United States Census Bureau, the town of Dannemora has a total area of 65.8 square miles (170.5 km^{2}), of which 59.1 square miles (153.0 km^{2}) is land and 6.8 square miles (17.5 km^{2}), or 10.27%, is water.

The western town line is the border of Franklin County.

Most of the town is within the Adirondack Park, on the western side of the county. However, the statute defining the Adirondack Park specifically excludes Dannemora and nearby Altona, due to the prison facilities located in both towns.

New York State Route 374 is an east-west highway in Dannemora.

Chazy Lake is a large water body that occupies the center of the town. The Great Chazy River begins at the northern end of Chazy Lake and is an eastward-flowing tributary of Lake Champlain. Upper Chateaugay Lake, near the western border of the town, empties through the Chateaugay Narrows into Lower Chateaugay Lake in Franklin County, which marks the beginning of the Chateaugay River, a northward-flowing tributary of the St. Lawrence River.

=== Climate ===
Climate data for Dannemora, 1991–2020 normals, 1906-2020 extremes: 1340ft (408m)
| Month | Jan | Feb | Mar | Apr | May | Jun | Jul | Aug | Sep | Oct | Nov | Dec | Year |
|---|---|---|---|---|---|---|---|---|---|---|---|---|---|
| Record high °F (°C) | 64 (18) | 67 (19) | 79 (26) | 88 (31) | 94 (34) | 97 (36) | 98 (37) | 98 (37) | 95 (35) | 88 (31) | 74 (23) | 65 (18) | 98 (37) |
| Mean maximum °F (°C) | 50.2 (10.1) | 49.0 (9.4) | 59.3 (15.2) | 73.6 (23.1) | 82.2 (27.9) | 86.7 (30.4) | 87.6 (30.9) | 86.1 (30.1) | 83.6 (28.7) | 74.4 (23.6) | 62.7 (17.1) | 52.0 (11.1) | 89.5 (31.9) |
| Mean daily maximum °F (°C) | 27.7 (−2.4) | 30.5 (−0.8) | 39.6 (4.2) | 53.2 (11.8) | 67.0 (19.4) | 74.9 (23.8) | 79.2 (26.2) | 77.6 (25.3) | 70.8 (21.6) | 57.5 (14.2) | 44.2 (6.8) | 33.0 (0.6) | 54.6 (12.6) |
| Daily mean °F (°C) | 18.1 (−7.7) | 20.6 (−6.3) | 29.8 (−1.2) | 42.9 (6.1) | 56.1 (13.4) | 64.6 (18.1) | 69.0 (20.6) | 67.4 (19.7) | 60.3 (15.7) | 48.2 (9.0) | 35.9 (2.2) | 24.6 (−4.1) | 44.8 (7.1) |
| Mean daily minimum °F (°C) | 8.5 (−13.1) | 10.8 (−11.8) | 20.0 (−6.7) | 32.5 (0.3) | 45.2 (7.3) | 54.2 (12.3) | 58.9 (14.9) | 57.2 (14.0) | 49.9 (9.9) | 38.8 (3.8) | 27.6 (−2.4) | 16.2 (−8.8) | 35.0 (1.6) |
| Mean minimum °F (°C) | −15.0 (−26.1) | −9.8 (−23.2) | −2.7 (−19.3) | 17.6 (−8.0) | 30.8 (−0.7) | 41.4 (5.2) | 49.6 (9.8) | 46.8 (8.2) | 36.1 (2.3) | 24.9 (−3.9) | 9.8 (−12.3) | −5.6 (−20.9) | −17.4 (−27.4) |
| Record low °F (°C) | −34 (−37) | −37 (−38) | −22 (−30) | −1 (−18) | 18 (−8) | 30 (−1) | 40 (4) | 33 (1) | 25 (−4) | 13 (−11) | −8 (−22) | −36 (−38) | −37 (−38) |
| Average precipitation inches (mm) | 2.92 (74) | 2.27 (58) | 2.80 (71) | 3.83 (97) | 3.95 (100) | 4.90 (124) | 4.24 (108) | 4.08 (104) | 3.85 (98) | 4.67 (119) | 2.91 (74) | 2.94 (75) | 43.36 (1,102) |
Source 1: NOAA
Source 2: XMACIS (temp records & monthly max/mins)

== Demographics ==
Historical population
| Census | Pop. | Note | %± |
|---|---|---|---|
| 1860 | 1,271 | | — |
| 1870 | 1,512 | | 19.0% |
| 1880 | 2,962 | | 95.9% |
| 1890 | 3,977 | | 34.3% |
| 1900 | 3,720 | | −6.5% |
| 1910 | 4,203 | | 13.0% |
| 1920 | 4,061 | | −3.4% |
| 1930 | 4,720 | | 16.2% |
| 1940 | 6,362 | | 34.8% |
| 1950 | 5,614 | | −11.8% |
| 1960 | 6,141 | | 9.4% |
| 1970 | 4,719 | | −23.2% |
| 1980 | 4,717 | | 0.0% |
| 1990 | 5,232 | | 10.9% |
| 2000 | 5,149 | | −1.6% |
| 2010 | 4,898 | | −4.9% |
| 2020 | 4,037 | | −17.6% |
U.S. Decennial Census

As of the census of 2000, there were 5,149 people, 850 households, and 584 families residing in the town. The population density was 87.0 inhabitants per square mile (33.6/km^{2}). There were 1,253 housing units at an average density of 21.2 per square mile (8.2/km^{2}). The racial makeup of the town was 56.30% White, 32.34% Black or African American, 0.54% Native American, 0.85% Asian, 0.04% Pacific Islander, 8.95% from other races, and 0.97% from two or more races. Hispanics or Latinos of any race were 15.87% of the population.

There were 850 households, out of which 30.8% had children under the age of 18 living with them, 52.2% were married couples living together, 11.6% had a female householder with no husband present, and 31.2% were non-families. Of all households 26.6% were made up of individuals, and 14.0% had someone living alone who was 65 years of age or older. The average household size was 2.46 and the average family size was 2.91.

The age distribution was 10.3% under the age of 18, 11.7% from 18 to 24, 53.6% from 25 to 44, 18.0% from 45 to 64, and 6.4% who were 65 years of age or older. The median age was 35 years. For every 100 females, there were 367.2 males. For every 100 females age 18 and over, there were 446.6 males.

The median income for a household in the town was $37,805, and the median income for a family was $43,850. Males had a median income of $27,045 versus $25,132 for females. The per capita income for the town was $18,614. About 13.6% of families and 14.2% of the population were below the poverty line, including 24.3% of those under age 18 and 5.8% of those age 65 or over.

Note: The census counts prisoners based on where they are incarcerated. With the all-male state prison in Dannemora, the data listed above, except for household and family data, is likely to be skewed in comparison with the remainder of the town population and the population of neighboring non-prison towns, particularly with regard to ethnicity and the female:male ratio, because a disproportionate percentage of the prison population is male and black or Hispanic.

== Education ==
Saranac Central School District is the local school district.

== Communities and locations in the town ==
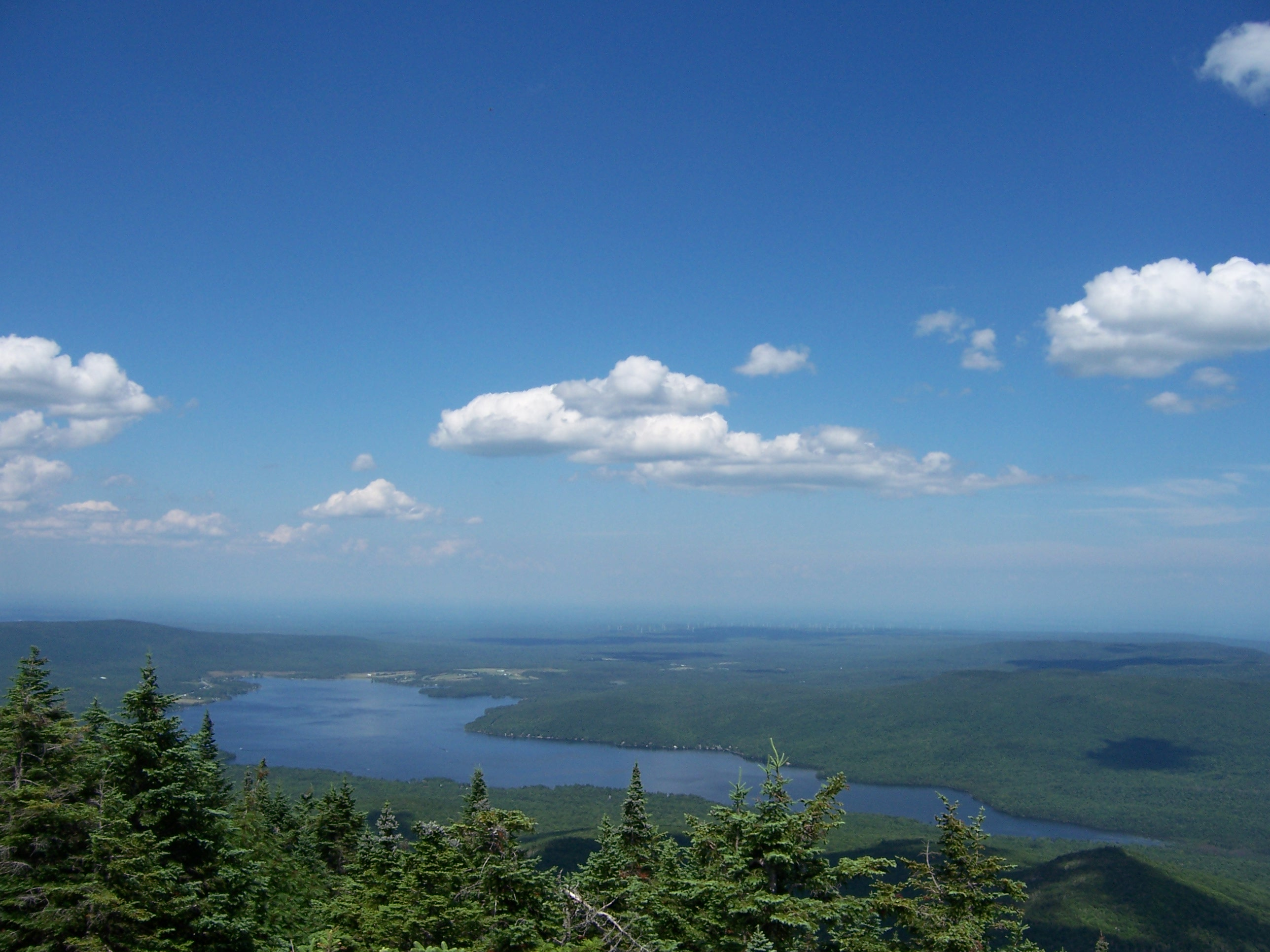
View of Chazy Lake from the top of Lyon Mountain

- Chazy Lake: A lake centrally located in the town.
- Chazy Lake: A hamlet on the western side of Chazy Lake.
- Clinton Correctional Facility (also known as "Dannemora"): One of New York State's maximum security prisons is located in the village of Dannemora. (Lucky Luciano once served time there.) The site also formerly housed the state's mental hospital for the criminally insane.
- Dannemora: The village of Dannemora is on the southern town line, located on NY-374.
- Dannemora Mountain: A small mountain north of the village.
- Ledger Corners: A location near the northern town line on NY-374.
- Lyon Mountain: The hamlet of Lyon Mountain is in the western part of the town.
- Lyon Mountain Correctional Facility: Formerly a minimum security prison located in the western part of the town.
- Seine Bay: A small bay in Chazy Lake north of the community of Chazy Lake.
- Upper Chateaugay Lake: A lake in the northwestern corner of the town.

== See also ==
- Dannemora, Sweden
