= Lyon Mountain (Clinton County, New York) =

Mountain in United States of America

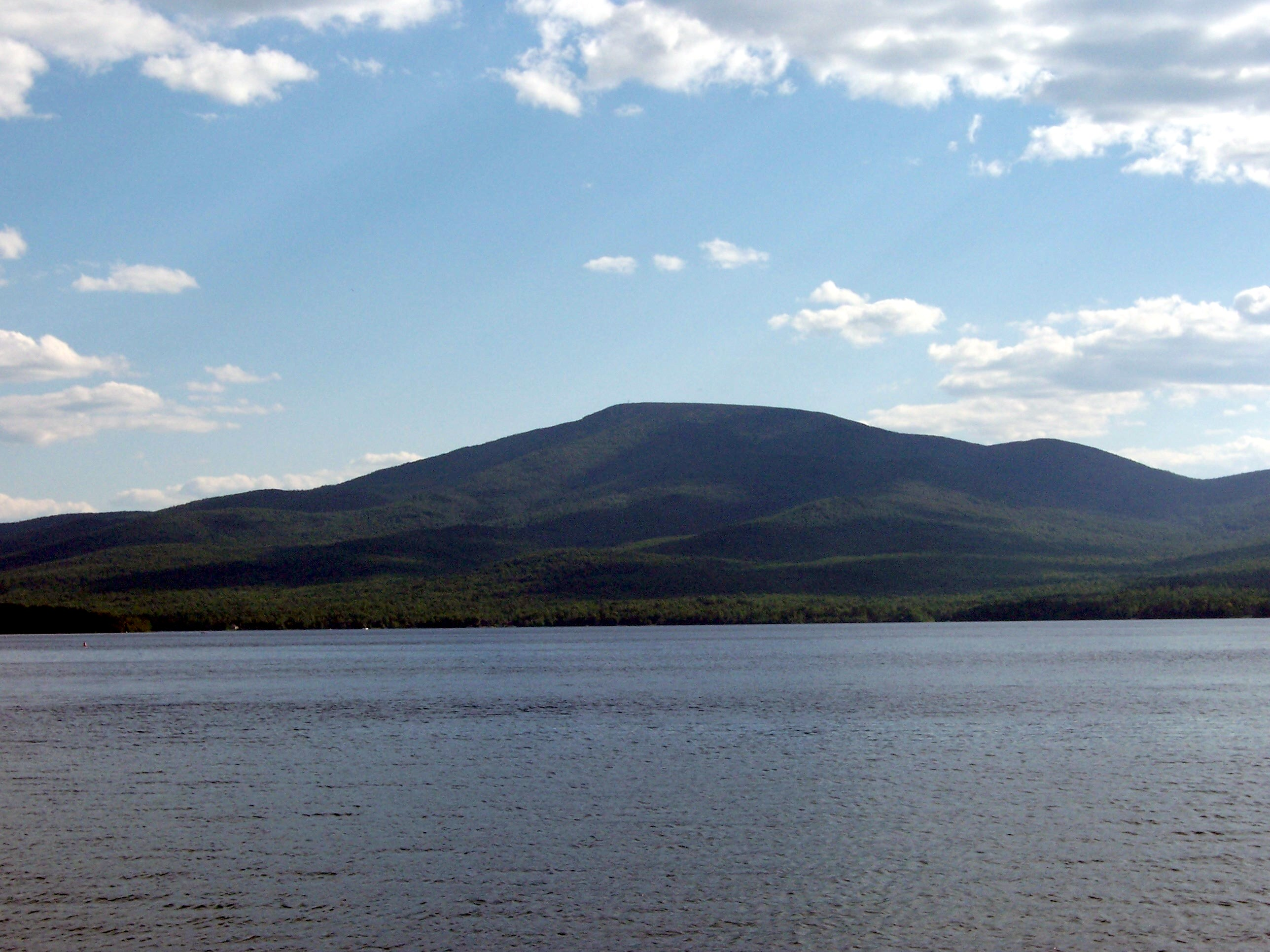
- Lyon Mountain seen from Chazy Lake

Highest point
- Elevation: 3,820 ft (1,160 m)
- Prominence: 2,212 ft (674 m)
- Listing: New York County High Points 6th
- Coordinates: 44°42′13″N 73°51′53″W

Geography
- Location within New York
- Location: Clinton County, New York
- Parent range: Adirondack Mountains
- Topo map: USGS Moffitsville

Lyon Mountain is a 3,820 ft (1,160 m) mountain located in Clinton County, New York, the county's high point. It is named for Nathaniel Lyon, an early settler of the area who moved from Vermont in 1803 and died circa 1850. The mountain is within New York's Adirondack Park.

Lyon Mountain Mountain Fire Observation Station, built in 1917, still stands atop the mountain, and can be accessed by hikers.

== Drainage ==
The mountain lies within the watershed of the Saint Lawrence River, and drains into the Gulf of Saint Lawrence. It's northeast slopes drain into Chazy Lake, the source of the Great Chazy River, then Lake Champlain, which drains into Canada's Richelieu River, thence into the Saint Lawrence River. The southeast slopes drain into Smithkill Brook, thence into True Brook, the Saranac River, and Lake Champlain. The southwest end of Lyon drains into Cold Brook, thence into the North Branch of the Saranac River. The west slopes of Lyon drain into Standish Brook, thence into Middle Kiln Brook, Upper and Lower Chateaugay Lakes, the source of the Chateaugay River, which drains into the Saint Lawrence River in Canada. The northwest slopes of Lyon drain into Separator Brook, thence into Upper Chateaugay Lake.

== History ==
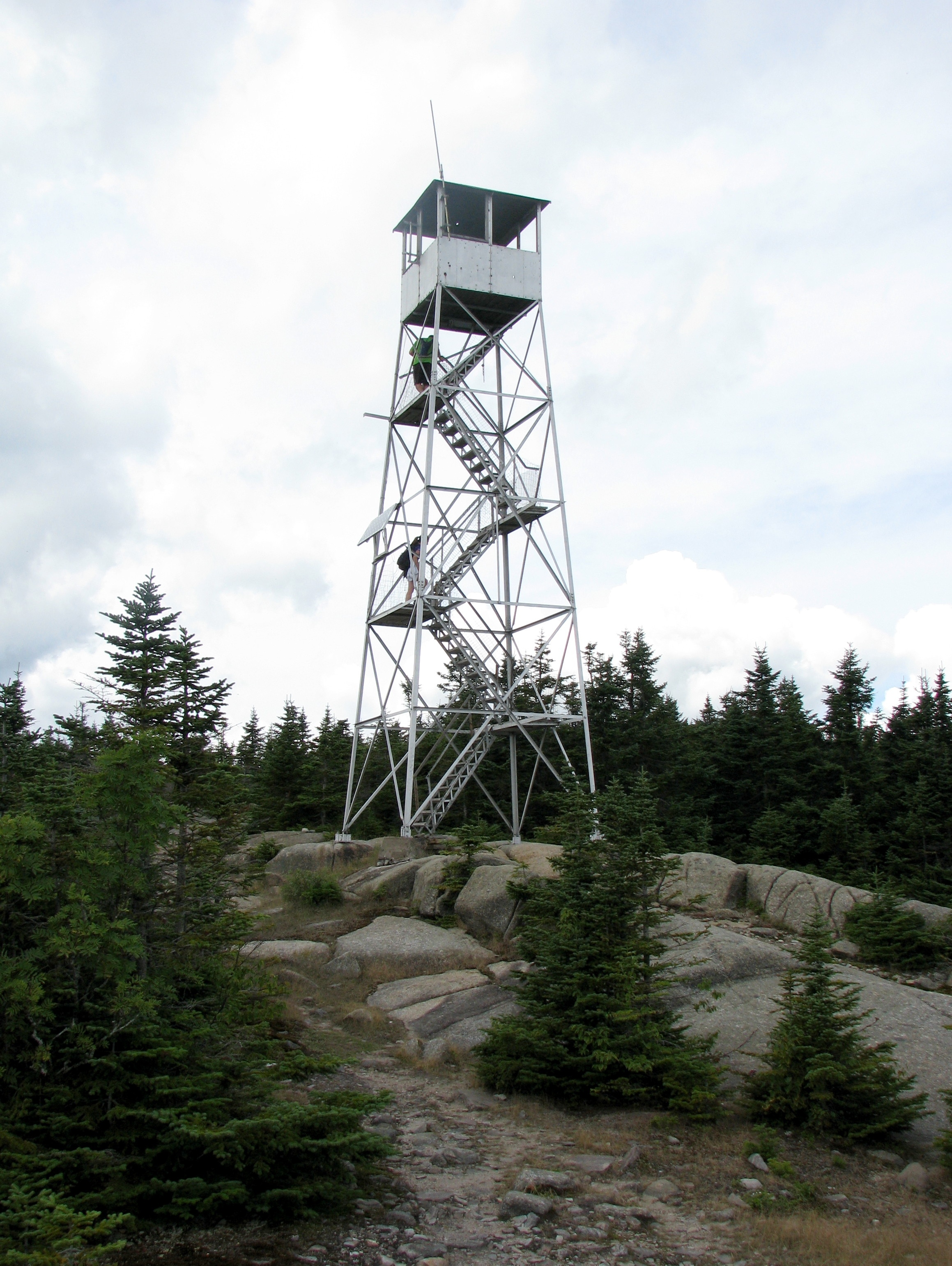
Lyon Mountain Fire Observation Tower

A fire lookout station was established in April 1910, without a fire tower, as the summit of Lyon Mountain was bare at that time. In 1917, the New York State Conservation Commission erected a 35-foot-tall (11 m) Aermotor LS40 steel fire lookout tower on the mountain. The tower ceased fire lookout operations at the end of the 1988 fire season. It was officially closed in early 1989, when the New York State Department of Environmental Conservation determined that airplanes were more effective for spotting fires than fire towers. The tower and surrounding land belonged to timber company Domtar until January 2005, when Domtar sold 20,000 acres (81 km^{2}) of its holdings around Lyon Mountain to The Nature Conservancy; the land has since been sold to New York State.

== Climate ==
Climate data for Lyon Mountain 44.7008 N, 73.8649 W, Elevation: 3,570 ft (1,088 m) (1991–2020 normals)
Month	Jan	Feb	Mar	Apr	May	Jun	Jul	Aug	Sep	Oct	Nov	Dec	Year
Mean daily maximum °F (°C)	20.9 (−6.2)	23.0 (−5.0)	30.8 (−0.7)	44.8 (7.1)	57.6 (14.2)	66.0 (18.9)	70.3 (21.3)	69.0 (20.6)	63.2 (17.3)	50.6 (10.3)	36.3 (2.4)	26.4 (−3.1)	46.6 (8.1)
Daily mean °F (°C)	12.5 (−10.8)	14.3 (−9.8)	22.3 (−5.4)	35.3 (1.8)	48.0 (8.9)	56.9 (13.8)	61.5 (16.4)	60.2 (15.7)	54.0 (12.2)	42.0 (5.6)	29.3 (−1.5)	19.1 (−7.2)	38.0 (3.3)
Mean daily minimum °F (°C)	4.1 (−15.5)	5.6 (−14.7)	13.9 (−10.1)	25.8 (−3.4)	38.4 (3.6)	47.9 (8.8)	52.8 (11.6)	51.4 (10.8)	44.7 (7.1)	33.4 (0.8)	22.3 (−5.4)	11.8 (−11.2)	29.3 (−1.5)
Average precipitation inches (mm)	3.84 (98)	3.07 (78)	3.62 (92)	4.86 (123)	5.22 (133)	6.39 (162)	5.69 (145)	5.39 (137)	5.23 (133)	6.38 (162)	4.20 (107)	4.05 (103)	57.94 (1,473)
Source: PRISM Climate Group

== See also ==
- List of mountains in New York
