= Fort Brown Site =

- U.S. National Register of Historic Places
- Location within New York Location within the United States
- Nearest city: Plattsburgh, New York
- Coordinates: 44°41′19″N 73°27′1″W
- Area: 2.9 acres (1.2 ha)
- Built: 1814
- NRHP reference No.: 78001846
- Added to NRHP: December 15, 1978

Fort Brown Site is a historic former redoubt located on the Saranac River at Plattsburgh in Clinton County, New York. It was built during the War of 1812 and used in Battle of Plattsburgh. It had eight guns and four interior buildings.

It was listed on the National Register of Historic Places in 1978.

The site is part of now Fort Brown Park and is operated by the City of Plattsburgh.
