= List of New York State Historic Markers in Essex County, New York =

This is an incomplete list of New York State Historic Markers in Essex County, New York.

== Listings county-wide ==
	Marker name	Image	Date designated	Location	City or Town	Coords	Marker text
1	TURNPIKE			On NYS 9N at Clintonville	Town of Chesterfield, New York		Port Kent to Hopkinton Built 1829–32. Via Ausable Forks, Black Brook, Franklin Falls, Loon Lake, St. Regis Falls, Hopkinton
2	TURNPIKE			On NYS 373 about 2 Miles from Port Kent	Chesterfield, Town of, New York		Port Kent to Hopkinton Built 1829–32. Via Ausable Forks, Black Brook, Franklin Falls, Loon Lake, St. Regis Falls, Hopkinton
3	TURNPIKE			On NYS 9N at Clintonville	Chesterfield, Town of, New York		Port Kent to Hopkinton Built 1829–32. Via Ausable Forks, Black Brook, Franklin Falls, Loon Lake, St. Regis Falls, Hopkinton
4	TURNPIKE			On NYS 9N at Clintonville	Chesterfield, Town of, New York		Port Kent to Hopkinton Built 1829–32. Via Ausable Forks, Black Brook, Franklin Falls, Loon Lake, St. Regis Falls, Hopkinton
5	TURNPIKE			On NYS 373 About 2 Miles from Port Kent	Chesterfield, Town of, New York		Port Kent to Hopkinton Built 1829–32. Via Ausable Forks, Black Brook, Franklin Falls, Loon Lake, St. Regis Falls, Hopkinton
6	500 FT.			On Crown Point Reservation at Champlain Bridge	Crown Point, Town of, New York		[Arrow] Ruins of Pre-revolutionary Village and Trading Post
7	BUILT BY GENERAL AMHERST 1759			On NYS 8 About 2 Miles South of Champlain Bridge	Crown Point, Town of, New York		Colonial and Revolutionary Military Road Crown Point to Ticonderoga
8	COLONIAL AND REVOLUTIONARY			On NYS 8 About 2 Miles South of Champlain Bridge	Crown Point, Town of, New York		Military Road Crown Point to Ticonderoga
9	GRENADIER FORT			On Crown Point Reservation at Champlain Bridge	Crown Point, Town of, New York		One of Secondary Defenses of Crown Point Built by General Amherst 1759 Village and Trading Post
10	GRENADIER FORT			On Crown Point Reservation at Champlain Bridge	Crown Point, Town of, New York		One of Secondary Defenses of Crown Point Built by General Amherst 1759
11	LIGHT INFANTRY FOR			On NYS 8 at Crown Jpoint Reservation	Crown Point, Town of, New York		One of the Secondary Defenses of Crown Point Built by General Amherst 1759
12	LIGHT INFANTRY FORT			On NYS 8 at Crown Point Reservation	Crown Point, Town of, New York		One of the Secondary Defenses of Crown Point Built by General Amherst 1759
13	ELIZABETHTOWN			On Us 9 at Elizabethtown	Elizabethtown, Town of, New York		Formed Feb. 12, 1798, Named in Honor of Elizabeth, Wife of William Gilliland, Patentee Manor of Willsboro County Seat Essex County
14	ELIZABETHTOWN			On Us 9 at Elizabethtown	Elizabethtown, Town of, New York		Formed Feb. 12, 1798, Named in Honor of Elizabeth, Wife of William Gilliland, Patentee Manor of Willsboro County Seat Essex County
15	NORTHWEST			On Us 9 at Elizabethtown	Elizabethtown, Town of, New York		Bay Road Begun Prior to 1810. from Westport Via Elizabethtown, Lake Placid, Saranac Lake, Santa Clara, Hopkinton
16	NORTHWEST			On Us 9N at Elizabethtown	Elizabethtown, Town of, New York		Bay Road Begun Prior to 1810. from Westport Via Elizabethtown, Lake Placid, Saranac Lake, Santa Clara, Hopkinton
17	STATE ARSENAL			On Us 9 at Elizabethtown	Elizabethtown, Town of, New York		Erected by State of New York in 1811 Used During War of 1812 Sold in 1848
18	STATE ARSENAL			On Us 9 at Elizabethtown	Elizabethtown, Town of, New York		Erected by State of New York in 1811 Used During War of 1812 Sold in 1848
19	COON MOUNTAIN			On NYS 22 About 1 Mile North of Wadhams	Essex, Town of, New York		Near the Northern Base of this Mountain, William Gilliland, Early Pioneer of Champlain Valley, Met his Tragic Death in 1796
20	SITE OF			On NYS 22 at Essex	Essex, Town of, New York		Willsborough Blockhouse Erected 1797 as a Protection Against Indians; Used from 1799 to 1807 as Essex County Courthouse
21	SITE OF			On NYS 22 at Essex	Essex, Town of, New York		Willsborough Blockhouse\ Erected 1797 as a Protection Against Indians; Used from 1799 to 1807 as Essex County Courthouse
22	SPLIT ROCK			On County Rd. About 3 Mi. South of Essex	Essex, Town of, New York		Called Roche Regio by Indians. Boundary Between Mohawks and Algonquins. by Treaty of Utrecht Conceded as Limit of English Dominions.
23	SPLIT ROCK			On County Rd. About 3 Mi. South of Essex	Essex, Town of, New York		Called Roche Regio by Indians. Boundary Between Mohawks and Algonquins. by Treaty of Utrecht Conceded as Limit of English Dominions.
24	ON THE EAST SHORE OPPOSITE			On Black Point Rd. South of Ticonderoga	General Amherst's Army., New York		At this Place Were Erected Two Blockhouses to Guard the Narrows and Landing Place 1759.
25	THEODORE ROOSEVELT			On NYS 28N About 6 Miles North of Minerva	Minerva, Town of, New York		Sept. 14, 1901, Stopped at Aiden Lair to Change Horses in Night Ride on Buckboard from Mt. Marcy to North Creek to Take Oath of President at Buffalo, N. Y.
26	THEODORE ROOSEVELT			On NYS 28N About 6 Miles North of Minerva	Minerva, Town of, New York		Sept. 14, 1901, Stopped at Aiden Lair to Change Horses in Night Ride on Buckboard from Mt. Marcy to North Creek to Take Oath of President at Buffalo, N.y.
27	CHAMPLAIN ACADEMY			On NYS 9N and NYS 22 at Port Henry	Moriah, Town of, New York		Site of Port Henry's First Tavern 1826. this Building Erected as Pease House 1850.
28	CHAMPLAIN ACADEMY			On NYS 9N and NYS 22 at Port Henry	Moriah, Town of, New York		Site of Port Henry's First Tavern 1826. this Building Erected as Pease House 1850.
29	DALLIBA HOUSE			On NYS 9N & NYS 22, Port Henry	Moriah, Town of, New York		Built 1824 by Major James Dalliba, who Named Port Henry in 1827 for Henry Huntington of Rome, N. Y.
30	DALLIBA HOUSE			On NYS 9N & NYS 22, Port Henry	Moriah, Town of, New York		Built 1824 by Major James Dalliba, who Named Port Henry in 1827 for Henry Huntington of Rome, N.y.
31	GUILFORD HOUSE			On NYS 9N & NYS 22, Port Henry	Moriah, Town of, New York		First Postoffice in Port Henry Located in this Building.
32	GUILFORD HOUSE			On NYS 9N & NYS 22, Port Henry	Moriah, Town of, New York		First Postoffice in Port Henry Located in this Building
33	HUBBARD HOUSE			On Broad Street at Port Henry	Moriah, Town of, New York		Built in 1802
34	HUBBARD HOUSE			On Broad Street at Port Henry	Moriah, Town of, New York		Built in 1802
35	MC KENSIE HOUSE			On NYS 9N & NYS 22, Port Henry	Moriah, Town of, New York		Built in 1785 by William Mc Kensie. Birthplace of his Son, Alexander. First Town Meeting of Moriah Here April 5, 1808.
36	MC KENSIE HOUSE			On NYS 9N & NYS 22, Port Henry	Moriah, Town of, New York		Built in 1785 by William Mc Kensie. Birthplace of his Son, Alexander. First Town Meeting of Moriah Here April 5, 1808
37	MEACHAM HOUSE			On NYS 9N and NYS 22 at Port Henry	Moriah, Town of, New York		Built in 1818 by Capt. William Meacham
38	MEACHAM HOUSE			On NYS 9N and NYS 22 at Port Henry	Moriah, Town of, New York		Built in 1818 by Capt. William Meacham
39	MILLER HOUSE			On Broad St. at Port Henry	Moriah, Town of, New York		Built 1839 by Henry Miller, Port Henry's First Wheelwright.
40	MILLER HOUSE			On Broad St. at Port Henry	Moriah, Town of, New York		Built 1839 by Henry Miller, Port Henry's First Wheelwright.
41	MORIAH PLANK ROAD			On County Road Between Moriah and Port Henry	Moriah, Town of, New York		Horse Drawn Wagons Hauled Iron Ore from Mines to Port Henry Over this Road Until 1869.
42	MORIAH PLANK ROAD			On Broad Street at Port Henry	Moriah, Town of, New York		Horse Drawn Wagons Hauled Iron Over this Road Until 1869.
43	MORIAH PLANK ROAD			On County Road Between Port Henry and Moriah	Moriah, Town of, New York		Horse Drawn Wagons Hauled Iron Ore from Mines to Port Henry Over this Road Until 1869.
44	MORIAH PLANK ROAD			On County Road Between Port Henry and Moriah	Moriah, Town of, New York		Horse Drawn Wagons Hauled Iron Ore from Mines to Port Henry Over this Road Until 1869.
45	MORIAH PLANK ROAD			On Co. Rd. Between Mineville and Moriah Center	Moriah, Town of, New York		Horse Drawn Wagons Hauled Iron Ore from Mines to Port Henry Over this Road Until 1869.
46	MORIAH PLANK ROAD			On Broad Street at Port Henry	Moriah, Town of, New York		Horse Drawn Wagons Hauled Iron Ore from Mines to Port Henry Over this Road Until 1869.
47	MORIAH PLANK ROAD			On County Road Between Moriah and Port Henry	Moriah, Town of, New York		Horse Drawn Wagons Hauled Iron Ore from Mines to Port Henry Over this Road Until 1869.
48	MORIAH PLANK ROAD			On Broad Street at Port Henry	Moriah, Town of, New York		Horse Drawn Wagons Hauled Iron Ore from Mines to Port Henry Over this Road Until 1869.
49	MORIAH PLANK ROAD			On County Road at Moriah	Moriah, Town of, New York		Horse Drawn Wagons Hauled Iron Ore from Mines to Port Henry Over this Road Until 1869.
50	MORIAH PLANK ROAD			On Co. Rd. Between Mineville and Moriah Center	Moriah, Town of, New York		Horse Drawn Wagons Hauled Iron Ore from Mines to Port Henry Over this Road Until 1869.
51	MORIAH PLANK ROAD			On County Road at Moriah	Moriah, Town of, New York		Horse Drawn Wagons Hauled Iron Ore from Mines to Port Henry Over this Road Until 1869.
52	SHORE LINE			On NYS 9N & NYS 22, Port Henry	Moriah, Town of, New York		of Butterfield's Bay. Boats Were Moored Along North Main Street Before Building of Railroad Through Here
53	SHORE LINE			On NYS 9N & NYS 22, Port Henry	Moriah, Town of, New York		of Butterfield's Bay. Boats Were Moored Along North Main Street Before Building of Railroad Through Here
54	SITE OF			On NYS 9N & NYS 22, Port Henry	Moriah, Town of, New York		Porter's and Lewis's Mills Built 1766; Supplied Lumber for Fort Crown Point and Arnold's Fleet. Entire Valley Dependent on Grist Mill.
55	SITE OF			On NYS 9N & NYS 22, Port Henry	Moriah, Town of, New York		First Blast Furnace Erected in 1824 by Major James Dalliba; Converted Into Stove Works in 1827
56	SITE OF			On NYS 9N & NYS 22, Port Henry	Moriah, Town of, New York		First Blast Furnace Erected in 1824 by Major James Dalliba; Converted Into Stove Works in 1827
57	SITE OF			On NYS 9N & NYS 22, Port Henry	Moriah, Town of, New York		Porter's and Lewsis Mills Built 1766; Supplies Lumber for Fort Crown Point and Arnold's Fleet. Entire Valley Dependent on Grist Mill.
58	THIS BUILDING			On Broad Street at Port Henry	Moriah, Town of, New York		Erected in 1850 on South Main Street as Second Schoolhouse in Port Henry
59	THIS BUILDING			On Broad Street at Port Henry	Moriah, Town of, New York		Erected in 1850 on South Main Street as Second Schoolhouse in Port Henry
60	TRAINING GROUND			On NYS 9N & NYS 22, Port Henry	Moriah, Town of, New York		Prior to 1850 Militia of Southern Essex County Held June Training Here
61	TRAINING GROUND			On NYS 9N & NYS 22, Port Henry	Moriah, Town of, New York		Prior to 1850 Militia of Southern Essex County Held June Training Here
62	JOHN BROWN			On County Road About 1? Miles South of Lake Placid	North Elba, Town of, New York		Occupied House on this Site in 1848-50 While Clearing the Land Now Known as John Brown's Farm.
63	JOHN BROWN			On County Road About 1½ Miles South of Lake Placid	North Elba, Town of, New York		Occupied House on this Site in 1848-50 While Clearing the Land Now Known as John Brown's Farm.
	TIMBUCTOO		2022	corner of Old Military Road and Bear Cub Road	North Elba, Town of, New York	44°15′55.256″N 73°58′53.638″W	Approximate site of Timbuctoo, New York, a lost African-American settlement
64	NORTHWEST			On NYS 86A About 2 Miles South of Lake Placid	North Elba, Town of, New York		Bay Road Begun Prior to 1810. from Westport Via Elizabethtown, Lake Placid, Saranac Lake, Santa Clara, Hopkinton
65	NORTHWEST			On NYS 86A About 2 Miles South of Lake Placid	North Elba, Town of, New York		Bay Road Begun Prior to 1810. from Westport Via Elizabethtown, Lake Placid, Saranac Lake, Santa Clara, Hopkinton
66	a BATTERY OF GUNS PLACED ON			On the Portage at Ticonderoga	Ticonderoga, Town of, New York		Mount Defiance by British Artillery Officers in July 1777 Forced Evacuation of Fort Ticonderoga by General St. Clair.
67	a BATTERY OF GUNS PLACED ON			On the Portage of Ticonderoga	Ticonderoga, Town of, New York		Mount Defiance by British Artillery Officers in July 1777 Forcedr Evacuation of Fort Ticonderoga by General St. Clair.
68	ALONG THIS STREET RAN THE			On the Portage at Ticonderoga	Ticonderoga, Town of, New York		Old Military Road Fortified in 1759 by General Amherst Prior to his Siege of Fort Ticonderoga
69	ALONG THIS STREET RAN THE			On the Portage at Ticonderoga	Ticonderoga, Town of, New York		Old Military Road Fortified in 1759 by General Amherst Prior to his Siege of Fort Ticonderoga
70	ARROW			On Mt/hope Ave. at Ticonderoga	Ticonderoga, Town of, New York		On Hill Above Mount Hope Battery Occupied by General Burgoyne 1777
71	COLONIAL AND REVOLUTIONARY			On NYS 8 & NYS 22 About 3? Mis. N. of Ticonderoga	Ticonderoga, Town of, New York		Military Road Crown Point to Ticonderoga
72	COLONIAL AND REVOLUTIONARY			On NYS 8 & NYS 9N & NYS 22 About 3½ Mis. N. of Ticonderoga	Ticonderoga, Town of, New York		Military Road Crown Point to Ticonderoga
73	FATHER JOGUES			On Black Pt. Rd. So. of Ticonderoga	Ticonderoga, Town of, New York		Rene Goupil and Guillaume Coutre in 1642 Were the First White Men to See These Waters, Named Lac Du St. Sacrement by Jogues in 1646
74	FATHER JOGUES			On Black Point Rd. South of Ticonderoga	Ticonderoga, Town of, New York		Rene Goupil and Guillaume Coutre in 1642 Were the First White Men to See These First White Men to See These Sacrement by Jogues in 1646
75	GARRISON CEMETERY			On Ft. Ticonderoga Reservation at Ticonderoga	Ticonderoga, Town of, New York		Here Are Buried Several Hundred Officers and Men of the American Army, Chiefly New York, New Jersey and Pennsylvania Militia 1775–1777
76	GARRISON CEMETERY			On Ft. Ticonderoga Reservation at Ticonderoga	Ticonderoga, Town of, New York		Here Are Buried Several Hundred Officers and Men of the American Army, Chiefly New York, New Jersey and Pennsylvania Militia 1775–1777
77	HERE STOOD			On Ft. Ticonderoga Reservation at Ticonderoga	Ticonderoga, Town of, New York		the King's Store a Stone Building Erected by the French in 1756 and in Use for About 100 Years
78	HERE STOOD			On Ft. Ticonderoga Reservation at Ticonderoga	Ticonderoga, Town of, New York		the King's Store a Stone Building Erected by the French in 1756 and in Use for About 100 Years.
79	HUT SITES			On Ft. Ticonderoga Reservation at Ticonderoga	Ticonderoga, Town of, New York		Within a Radius of One-half Mile Were 150 Huts Occupied by American Troops in the Revolution 1775–1777
80	HUT SITES			On Ft. Ticonderoga Reservation at Ticonderoga	Ticonderoga, Town of, New York		Within a Radius of One-half Mile Were 150 Huts Occupied by American Troops in the Revolution 1775–1777
81	NEAR HERE MARCH 13, 1758			On Ticonderoga Country Golf Course So. of Ticonderoga	Ticonderoga, Town of, New York		Rogers' Rangers Fought the Snowshoe Battle and Were Defeated by French and Indians Under Durantaye and Langy
82	NEAR HERE MARCH 13, 1758			On Ticonderoga Country Golf Course So. of Ticonderoga	Ticonderoga, Town of, New York		Rogers' Rangers Fought the Snowshoe Battle and Were Defeated by French and Indians Under Durantaye and Langy
83	NEAR HERE ON JULY 30, 1609			On Fr. Ticonderoga Reservation a Ticonderoga	Ticonderoga, Town of, New York		Samuel De Champlain Aided by Two Frenchmen and Huron and Montagnais Allies Defeated a Band of Allies Defeated a Band of Iroquois Warriors
84	NEAR HERE ON JULY 30, 1609			On Ft. Ticonderoga Reservation at Ticonderoga	Ticonderoga, Town of, New York		Samuel De Champlain Aided by Two Frenchmen and Huron and Montagnais Allies Defeated a Band of Iroquois Warriors
85	NEAR HERE ON JULY 6, 1758			On Alexandria Ave. Southwest of Ticonderoga	Ticonderoga, Town of, New York		Lord Howe Waskilled in a Skirmish With a French Advance Guard Under Langy and Trepezec
86	NEAR HERE ON JULY 6, 1758			On Alexandria Ave. Southwest of Ticonderoga	Ticonderoga, Town of, New York		Lord Howe Was Killed in a Skirmish With a French Advance Guard Under Langy and Trepezec
87	NEAR THIS SPOT STOOD THE			On Alexandria Ave. at Ticonderoga	Ticonderoga, Town of, New York		House and Store of John Stoughton First English Patentee at Ticonderoga 1764
88	NEAR THIS SPOT STOOD THE			On Alexandria Ave. Southwest of Ticonderoga	Ticonderoga, Town of, New York		House and Store of John Stoughton First English Patentee at Ticonderoga 1764
89	ON THE EAST SHORE OPPOSITE			On Black Pt. Rd. So. of Ticonderoga	Ticonderoga, Town of, New York		this Place Were Erected Two Blockhouses to Guard the Narrows and Landing Place 1759.
90	ON THIS POINT IN 1759 STOOD			On Black Point Rd. South of Ticonderoga	Ticonderoga, Town of, New York		a Blockhouse the Southerly Outpost of the Fort. Here Landed Rogers Rangers as the Vanguard of General Amherst's Army
91	ON THIS POINT IN 1759 STOOD			On Black Point Rd. South of Ticonderoga	Ticonderoga, Town of, New York		a Blockhouse the Southerly Outpost of the Fort. Here Landed Rogers Rangers as the Vanguard of General Amherst's Army.
92	ON THIS SPOT IN 1756			On Black Point at Ticonderoga	Ticonderoga, Town of, New York		French Engineers Built a Redoubt to Guard the Bridge and Landing Place at the Head of the Portage.
93	ON THIS SPOT IN 1756			On Black Point at Ticonderoga	Ticonderoga, Town of, New York		French Engineers Built a Redoubt to Guard the Bridge and Landing Place at the Head of the Portage.
94	OPPOSITE THIS SPOT ON THE			On Baldwin Rd. So. of Ticonderoga	Ticonderoga, Town of, New York		West Bank of the Outlet of Lake George Stood a Blockhouse and French Defenses to Cover the Bridge and Landing Place.
95	REDOUBT			On Ft. Ticonderoga Reservation at Ticonderoga	Ticonderoga, Town of, New York		Lotbiniere Built by the French in 1756, Called by the British and American Armies the Grenadiers' Battery
96	REDOUBT			On Ft. Ticonderoga Reservation at Ticonderoga	Ticonderoga, Town of, New York		Lotbiniere Built by the French in 1756, Called by the British and American Armies the Grenadiers' Battery
97	SCENE OF			On NYS 8 & NYS 9N About 1 Mile South of Ticonderoga	Ticonderoga, Town of, New York		Arrow Rogers' Battle Rogers' Battle Previous to his Reputed Glide Off Rogers' Rock 1758
98	SCENE OF			On NYS 8 & NYS 9N About 1 Mile South of Ticonderoga	Ticonderoga, Town of, New York		[Arrow] Rogers' Battle on Snowshoes Previous to his Reputed Glide Off Rogers' Rock 1758
99	THE FRENCH LINES			On Ft. Ticonderoga Reservation at Ticonderoga	Ticonderoga, Town of, New York		Built by Troops Under Montcalm July 6–7, 1758. Repaired by American Troops 1776.
100	THE FRENCH LINES			On Ft. Ticonderoga Reservation at Ticonderoga	Ticonderoga, Town of, New York		Built by Troops Under Montcalm July 6–7, 1758. Repaired by American Troops 1776.
101	THESE DEFENSES			On Mt. Hope at Ticonderoga	Ticonderoga, Town of, New York		Were Built by American Troops in 1776 and Occupied by General Burgoyne in 1777 Controlling the Portage and Lower Landing Place
102	THESE DEFENSES			On Mt. Hope at Ticonderoga	Ticonderoga, Town of, New York		Were Built by American Troops in 1776 and Occupied by General Burgoyne in 1777 Controlling the Portage and Lower Landing Place
103	ARROW			On Mt/hope Ave. at Ticonderoga	Ticonderoga, Town of, New York		On Hill Above Mount Hope Battery Occupied by General Burgoyne 1777
104	FIRST SAWMILL			On NYS 9N & NYS 22 About 3 Miles South of Westport	Westport, Town of, New York		in Town of Westport Stood Here. Built 1770 Boards from Mill Used in Building Barracks at Crown Point & Ticonderoga
105	FIRST SAWMILL			On NYS 9N & NYS 22 About 3 Miles South of Westport	Westport, Town of, New York		in Town of Westport Stood Here. Built 1770 Boards from Mill Used in Building Barracks at Crown Point & Ticonderoga
106	HERE STOOD THE			On NYS 9N & NYS 22 About 3 Miles South of Westport	Westport, Town of, New York		First Tavern at Northwest Bay Built by John Halstead About 1800
107	HERE STOOD THE			On NYS 9N & NYS 22 About 3 Miles South of Westport	Westport, Town of, New York		First Tavern at Northwest Bay Built by John Halstead About 1800
108	NORTHWEST			On NYS 9N About 1 Mile West of Westport	Westport, Town of, New York		Bay Road Begun Prior to 1810, from Westport Via Elizabethtown, Lake Placid, Saranac Lake, Santa Clara, Hopkinton
109	NORTHWEST			On NYS 9N About 1 Mile West of We	Westport, Town of, New York		Bay Road Begun Prior to 1810, from Westport Via Elizabethtown, Lake Placid, Saranac Lake, Santa Clara, Hopkinton
110	BOUQUET RIVER			On NYS 22 at Willsboro	Willsboro, Town of, New York		Burgoyne's Encampment June 20–25, 1777 Treaty With the Indians Made and Proclamation Issued.
111	BOUQUET RIVER			On NYS 22 at Willsboro	Willsboro, Town of, New York		Burgoyne's Encampment June 20–25, 1777 Treaty With the Indians Made and Proclamation Issued.
112	LAKEVIEW CEMETERY			On NYS 22 About 2? Miles South of Willsboro	Willsboro, Town of, New York		First Burial 1791 Contains Grave of William Gilliland, Founder of Town of Willsboro
113	LAKEVIEW CEMETERY			On NYS 22 About 2½ Miles South of Willsboro	Willsboro, Town of, New York		First Burial 1791 Contains Grave of William Gilliland, Founder of Town of Willsboro
114	MASONIC HALL			On NYS 22 About 2? Miles South of Willsboro	Willsboro, Town of, New York		Essex Lodge No. 152 Chartered February 14, 1806; Discontinued in 1826.
115	MASONIC HALL			On NYS 22 About 2½ Miles South of Willsboro	Willsboro, Town of, New York		Essex Lodge No. 152 Chartered February 14, 1806; Discontinued in 1826.
116	MASONIC HALL			On NYS 22 About 2? Miles South of Willsboro	Willsboro, Town of, New York		Essex Lodge No. 152 Chartered February 14, 1806; Discontinued in 1826.
117	MEMORIAL CEMETERY			On NYS 22 About 1/2 Miles South of Willsboro	Willsboro, Town of, New York		First Burial 1793 Contains Grave of Martin Aiken, Leader of Aiken's Volunteers at Battle of Plattsburgh
118	MEMORIAL CEMETERY			On NYS 22 About ? Mi. South of Willsboro	Willsboro, Town of, New York		First Burial 1793 Contains Grave of Martin Aiken, Leader of Aiken's Volunteers at Battle of Plattsburgh
119	NEAR HERE			On NYS 22 About 1/2 Mile North of Essex	Willsboro, Town of, New York		Ebenezer Allen Captured British Soldiers and Military Stores After Surrender at Saratoga
120	NEAR HERE			On NYS 22 About ? Mile North of Essex	Willsboro, Town of, New York		Ebenezer Allen Captured British Soldiers and Military Stores After Surrender at Saratoga
121	SITE OF			On NYS 22 at Willsboro	Willsboro, Town of, New York		First House Built by William Gilliland in 1765
122	SITE OF			On NYS 22 at Willsboro	Willsboro, Town of, New York		First House Built by William Gilliland in 1765
123	WILLISBORO			On NYS 22 at Willsboro	Willsboro, Town of, New York		Founded in 1765 by William Billiland; Town Formed 1788; County Seat of Essex County 1797–1807
124	WILLSBORO			On NYS 22 at Willsboro	Willsboro, Town of, New York		Founded in 1765 by William Gilliland; Town Formed 1788; County Seat of Essex County 1797–1807
125	WILLSBORO			On NYS 22 at Willsboro	Willsboro, Town of, New York		Founded in 1765 by William Gilliland; Town Formed 1788; County Seat of Essex County 1797–1807

== See also ==
- List of New York State Historic Markers
- National Register of Historic Places listings in New York
- List of National Historic Landmarks in New York
