= Taylor Pond Wild Forest =

Forest in Adirondack Park, New York, U.S

The Taylor Pond Wild Forest is a discontinuous 53,280-acre area consisting of tracts of state land and easement land spread over a 567 square mile area designated as Wild Forest by the New York State Department of Environmental Conservation in the northeastern Adirondack Park. The area comprises

- 45,637 acres of Adirondack Forest Preserve lands in 26 separate parcels classified as Wild Forest
- 6,314 acres of State Forest lands in the 2,752-acre Terry Mountain State Forest and the 1,575-acre Burnt Hill State Forest
- 23,067 acres of conservation easement lands with public recreational rights in the 15,713-acre Black Brook Easement Tract, 3,748-acre Franklin Falls Easement Tract, and the 794-acre Shell Rock Easement Tract.

The tract covers portions of 13 towns in three counties in the region around Taylor Pond, Silver Lake and Union Falls flow, in the town of Franklin in Franklin County and the town of Black Brook in Clinton County.

The forest is home to the Catamount Mountain Trail, a four-mile round trip trail with parking on nearby Forestdale Road. The forest also contains the Silver Lake Mountains.

Other parts of the Wild Forest are in the towns of Ausable, Peru, and Saranac in Clinton County, and the towns of Chesterfield, Elizabethtown, Essex, Jay, Lewis, St. Armand, Westport and Willsboro in Essex County.

Car camping is available at Taylor Pond campground along with a few boat-in sites; Poke-O-Moonshine campground is closed. Catamount, Silver Lake, and Poke-O-Moonshine Mountains are popular destinations for hikers in the Wild Forest. There is camping on Union and Franklin Falls ponds. Activities supported include hunting, fishing, hiking, biking, boating and paddling, horseback riding, snowmobiling, skiing and snowshoeing.

Because the private land is under conservation easement, visitors have described the area as "less crowded" and a "wilderness."

== See also ==
- List of New York wild forests
