= New York State Route 99 =

Former state highway in New York

New York State Route 99
- Port Kent–Hopkinton Turnpike
- Map of northeastern New York with NY 99 highlighted in red

Route information
- Maintained by Franklin County
- Length: 19.14 mi (30.80 km)
- Existed: 1930–September 26, 1994

Major junctions
- West end: NY 30 in Duane
- East end: NY 3 in Franklin

Location
- Country: United States
- State: New York
- Counties: Franklin

Highway system
- New York Highways; Interstate; US; State; Reference; Parkways
← I-99	→ NY 100

New York State Route 99 (NY 99) was a state highway in Franklin County. The western terminus of the route was at an intersection with NY 30 in Duane. Its eastern terminus was at a junction with NY 3 near the Franklin community of Merrillsville. The narrow, winding route passed through isolated and heavily wooded areas of Adirondack Park. NY 99 was known as the Port Kent–Hopkinton Turnpike and maintained by Franklin County as a county highway. The state highway had been co-designated, and is signed today solely as County Route 26 (CR 26).

The routing of NY 99 was originally part of the Port Kent and Hopkinton Turnpike, a 19th-century toll road that began in the town of Hopkinton and passed through central Franklin County on its way to the hamlet of Port Kent on the shores of Lake Champlain. The portion of the turnpike between Duane Center and Merrillsville was designated as NY 99 as part of the 1930 renumbering of state highways in New York. It remained unchanged until September 26, 1994, when the NY 99 designation was removed from the highway.

== Route description ==
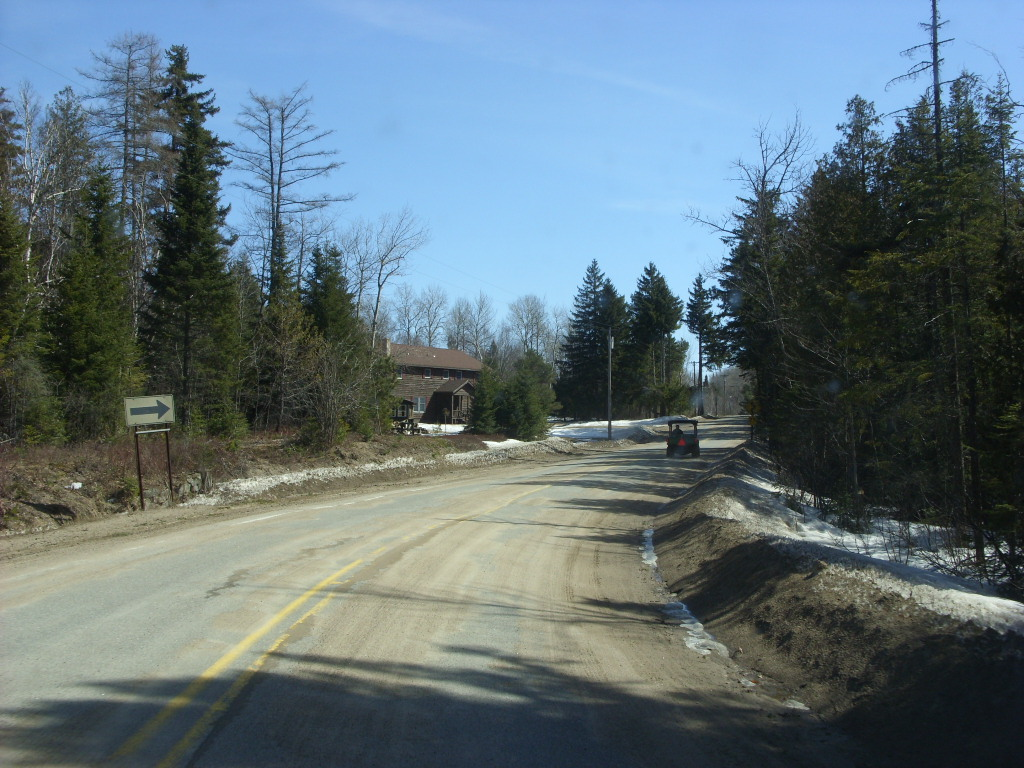
Eastbound on CR 26 (former NY 99) in Franklin

NY 99 began at an intersection with NY 30 west of the hamlet of Duane Center in the town of Duane. The route headed eastward as the Port Kent–Hopkinton Turnpike, passing through the small community of Duane Center before entering an isolated, wooded area of Franklin County and Adirondack Park. At the Franklin town line, NY 99 curved southeastward, roughly paralleling Hatch Brook as it climbed up the northeastern portion of Baldface Mountain. Past the mountain's summit, the route continued onward, winding its way southward along Hatch Brook to a small lake known as Duck Pond.

Past Duck Pond, the route turned to the southeast, passing by a series of small ponds and crossing under an old railroad grade as it ran along the base of a series of peaks known as the Loon Lake Mountains. NY 99 continued to follow the range to the northwestern edge of Loon Lake, where it veered to the northeast and ran along the northern and eastern shores of the lake to the hamlet of Loon Lake at its southeastern tip. NY 99 passed generally northwest–southeast through the small lakeside community before reentering another sparsely developed area of the town of Franklin. The highway progressed southeastward, crossing over the northern branch of the Saranac River and passing through the largely undeveloped community of Merrillsville before ending at an intersection with NY 3.

== History ==
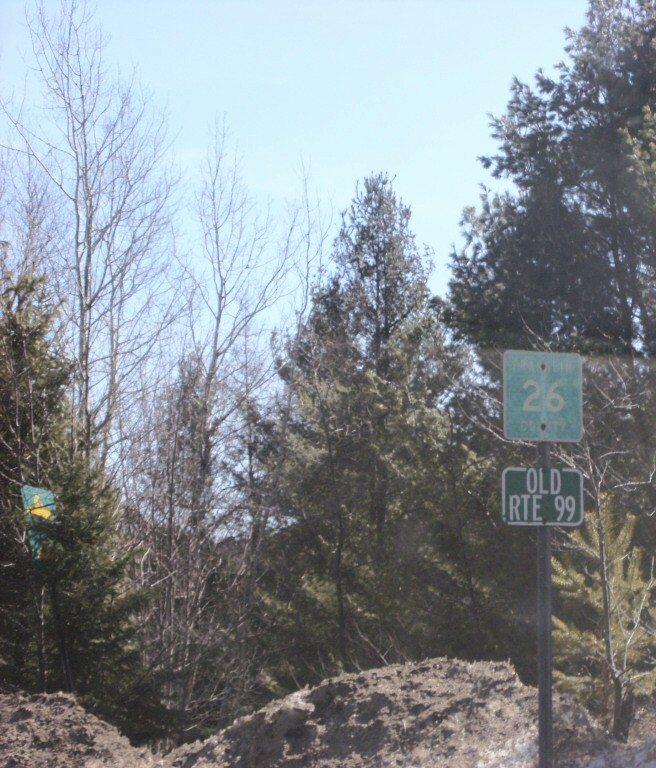
First reassurance marker on CR 26 (former NY 99) eastbound in Duane

On April 18, 1829, the New York State Legislature passed an act that allowed construction to begin on the Port Kent and Hopkinton Turnpike, a toll road that was to begin in the town of Hopkinton and end at the hamlet of Port Kent on the western shore of Lake Champlain. Construction began later that year and was completed in 1832. The 75-mile (121 km) highway opened in 1833. The turnpike operated for only five years before it was dissolved on March 30, 1838, at which time maintenance of the highway was transferred to the towns it ran within. The 19-mile (31 km) segment of the turnpike between then-NY 10 near the Duane hamlet of Duane Center and NY 3 near the Franklin hamlet of Merrillsville was designated as NY 99 as part of the 1930 renumbering of state highways in New York.

Although NY 99 was signed as a state highway, maintenance on the route was performed by Franklin County, which designated the roadway as CR 26. All of NY 99 was initially a gravel road; however, most of the road was paved in the early 1970s through the use of state funds procured by New York State Senator Ronald Stafford of Plattsburgh. The western and eastern extents of the road were paved soon afterward; however, the road was left unpaved in the vicinity of Loon Lake—a lake near the midpoint of the route—even though the necessary gravel base was applied to the entire highway. The unpaved section deteriorated as a result, and the NY 99 designation was removed from the roadway on September 26, 1994.

CR 26 has continued to deteriorate in the years since, with one 9-mile (14 km), limited maintenance segment seeing the most wear. This section, situated midway between NY 30 and NY 3, has become both littered with potholes and extremely narrow due to the erosion of the highway's shoulders. In mid-2009, residents of Loon Lake petitioned the county to repair all of CR 26 and to continuously maintain the highway, citing the road's regional importance as a through route for commuters traveling to and from the village of Malone.

== Major intersections ==
The entire route was in Franklin County.

Location	mi	km	Destinations	Notes
Duane	0.00	0.00	NY 30 / CR 14	Western terminus
Franklin	19.14	30.80	NY 3 / Alder Brook Park Road – Plattsburgh, Saranac Lake	Eastern terminus
1.000 mi = 1.609 km; 1.000 km = 0.621 mi

== See also ==
- List of county routes in Franklin County, New York
