= New York State Route 373 =

State highway in Essex County, New York, US

New York State Route 373
- NY 373 highlighted in red; NY 912T in blue

Route information
- Maintained by NYSDOT
- Length: 3.20 mi (5.15 km)
- Existed: 1930–present

Major junctions
- West end: US 9 in Chesterfield
- East end: Burlington–Port Kent Ferry landing in Chesterfield

Location
- Country: United States
- State: New York
- Counties: Essex

Highway system
- New York Highways; Interstate; US; State; Reference; Parkways
| ← NY 372 | → NY 374 |

New York State Route 373 (NY 373) is a short state highway in Essex County, New York, within Adirondack Park. It begins at U.S. Route 9 (US 9) and proceeds eastward, ending at a ferry landing on Lake Champlain. It intersects two county routes, several local roads, and a reference route—NY 912T—which connects it with US 9. NY 373 is the only connector between US 9 and the hamlet of Port Kent and the ferry that serves it.

The hamlet of Port Kent and the connecting road were originally built in 1823. The village was planned to act as a source of labor for iron manufacturing and to provide for the industrial needs of Essex County. The hamlet grew and eventually became connected to Burlington, Vermont, via an hour-long ferry across Lake Champlain. The road that accessed Port Kent originally began in Keeseville, but became part of the longer Port Kent and Hopkinton Turnpike in the 1830s. The highway that is now NY 373 was also designated as part of the Theodore Roosevelt International Highway in 1919.

When NY 373 was designated in 1930, a small portion of it was maintained by the town of Chesterfield. This section was turned over to the State of New York during a maintenance swap with Essex County in 1985.

== Route description ==
NY 373, located entirely within Adirondack Park, begins at US 9 at the Ausable Chasm, a deep, wooded canyon in the town of Chesterfield. The route intersects with NY 912T, its southern connector to US 9, about 0.1 miles (160 m) in. NY 373 continues farther along and intersects with County Route 71 (CR 71) before heading east-southeast just north of the Ausable River. The highway then intersects CR 17 and several local roads, and then turns east-northeast.

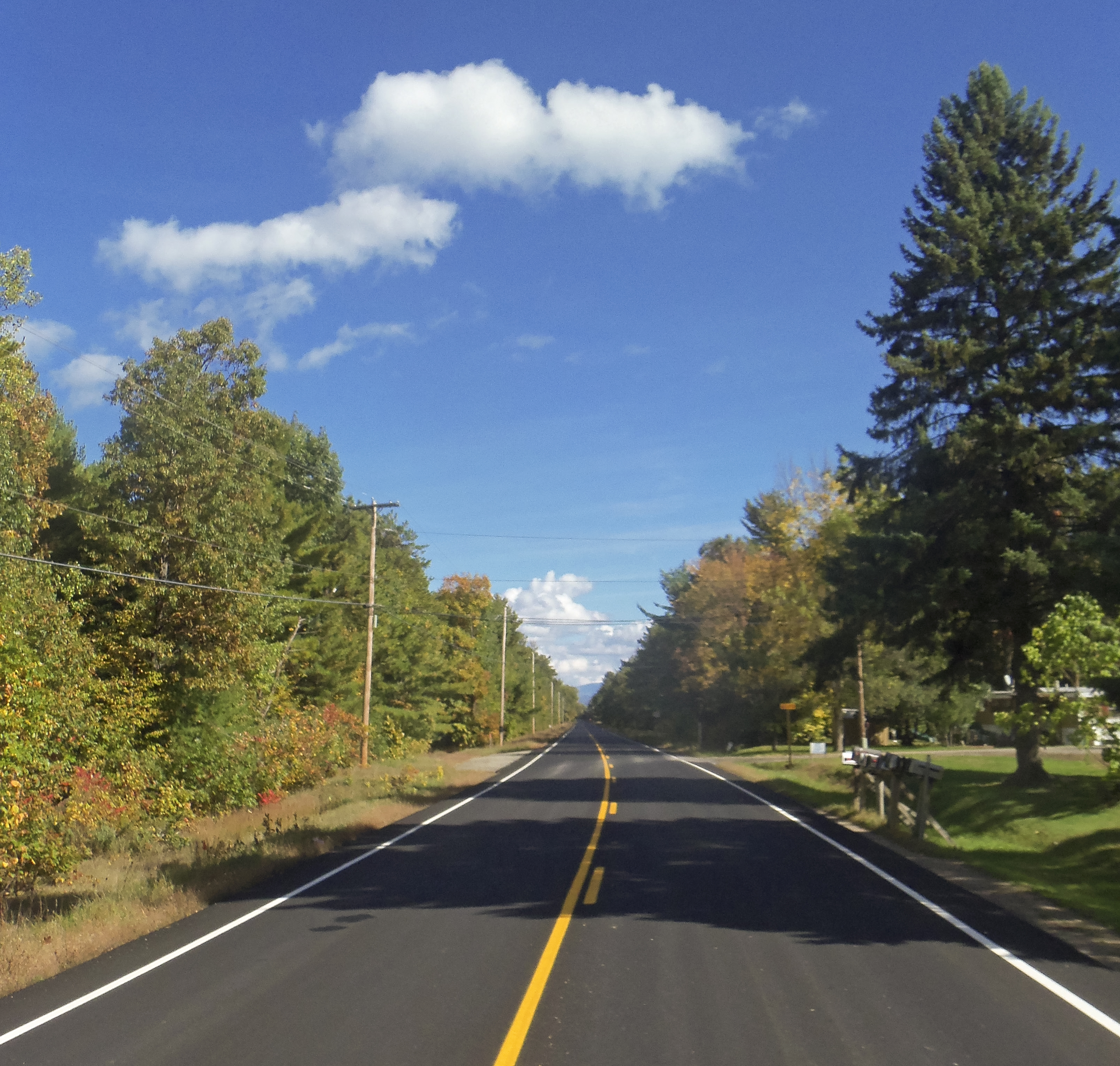
View east along NY 373 from near Bolton Acres campground

The route then passes south of a golf course and enters Port Kent, where it intersects with more local streets, most of which serve homes and businesses. The highway turns northward soon afterward, crosses a pair of train tracks maintained by Canadian Pacific Railway and the Port Kent Amtrak station, makes a U-turn and comes to an end at the Burlington–Port Kent Ferry landing.

The Burlington–Port Kent Ferry connects NY 373 and the hamlet of Port Kent to the city of Burlington, Vermont. This, one of three ferries to cross Lake Champlain, is the longest as it crosses the widest part of the lake. It is maintained by the Lake Champlain Transportation Company, and is open all seasons except winter.

== History ==
=== Port Kent and the early highway to Keeseville ===
In 1823, a company was funded to establish a settlement and fishing wharf opposite the city of Burlington, Vermont on Lake Champlain in order to assist in the growth of iron factories and to supply dormant energy to the Essex County area. The newly founded company chose the name "Port Kent" and located the new hamlet on a site north of Trembleau Point. The original alignment of what is now NY 373 began as a wide road that was built to access Port Kent from the nearby village of Keeseville.

NY 373 exists entirely within the boundaries of Adirondack Park, a protected area maintained by the State of New York. Adirondack Park was created in the 1880s after concerns arose about logging trees in the area. The logging was a substantial part of New York's economy, but protests were lodged by The New York Times and others against the clearing of entire mountains and wilderness areas of trees. Public opinion turned firmly against the loggers by the 1880s, and the park was created in 1885. It was the first State Forest Preserve in America. The park was further protected in 1894 when a clause was added to the New York Constitution which banned the selling of timber from state parks.

=== Old roads and designation ===
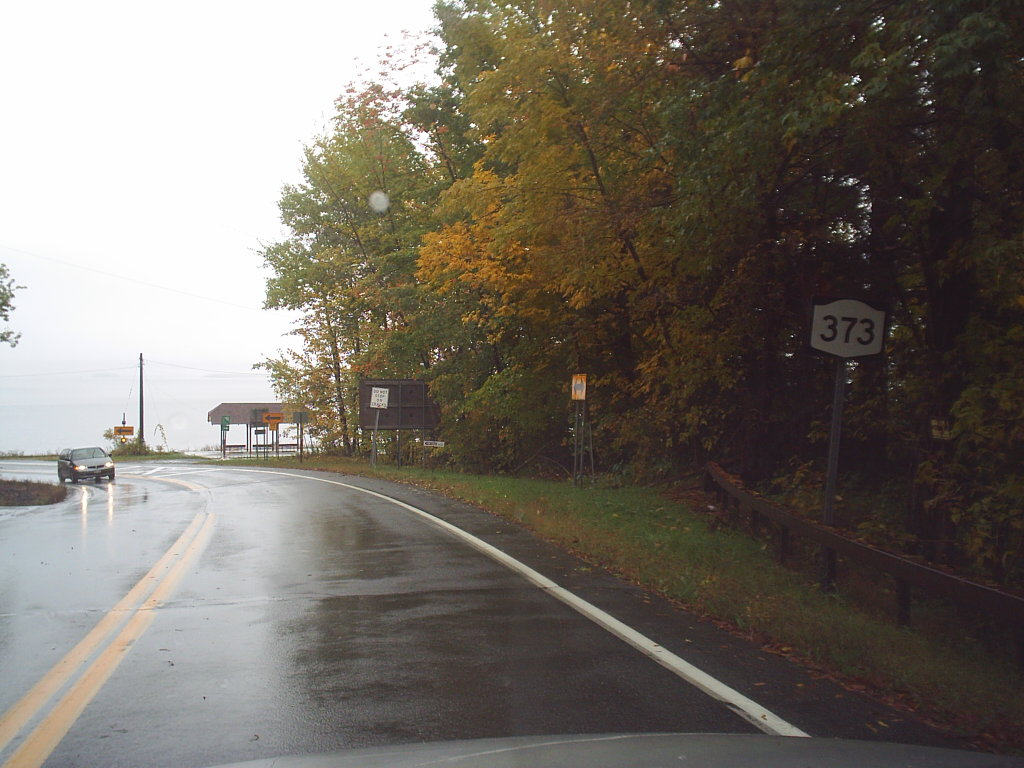
NY 373 heading eastbound with Lake Champlain in view

On April 16, 1827, a team of three surveyors were commissioned to determine a routing for a new highway leading from Hopkinton, a town in northeastern St. Lawrence County, to Lake Champlain. The task took 26 days, after which it was determined that the highway would meet Lake Champlain at Fort Kent. An act authorizing the construction of the highway was passed by the New York State Legislature on April 18, 1829. A total of approximately $38,500 (equivalent to $1,136,833 in 2024) was devoted to the project by the state of New York through the same act.

The 75-mile (121 km) highway opened in 1833 as a toll road named the Port Kent and Hopkinton Turnpike. The turnpike had only one toll gate, located near the center of the route. Two years later, the turnpike commissioners petitioned to the state of New York, asking for permission to replace the single gate with two gates at opposite ends of the turnpike that would collect half of the toll amount. The commissioners believed that the change in the toll gate locations would result in higher revenue, allowing them to continue maintaining the highway. The change was approved; however, the toll road was dissolved anyway three years later on March 30, 1838. At that time, maintenance of the Port Kent–Hopkinton highway was transferred to the towns through which it ran.

The Theodore Roosevelt International Highway, a transcontinental auto trail extending from Portland, Oregon, to Portland, Maine, was established in 1919. In eastern New York, the highway went through Keeseville, Ausable Chasm, and Fort Kent along what used to be the Port Kent and Hopkinton Turnpike before entering Vermont by way of the Burlington–Port Kent Ferry across Lake Champlain.

The state of New York assumed maintenance of most of the Ausable Chasm–Port Kent roadway at some point after 1920. In the 1930 renumbering of state highways in New York, the entirety of the highway from Ausable Chasm to the Port Kent ferry landing was designated as NY 373, despite the fact that the small portion of the route east of Lake Street in Port Kent was not maintained by the state at the time. On April 1, 1985, ownership and maintenance of NY 373 east of Lake Street was transferred from the town of Chesterfield to the state of New York as part of a highway maintenance swap between the state and Essex County.

== Major intersections ==
The entire route is in Chesterfield, Essex County.

| mi | km | Destinations | Notes |
|---|---|---|---|
| 0.00 | 0.00 | US 9 to I-87 – Keeseville, Plattsburgh | Western terminus; Hamlet of Ausable Chasm |
| 3.20 | 5.15 | Burlington–Port Kent Ferry | Eastern terminus; Hamlet of Port Kent |
1.000 mi = 1.609 km; 1.000 km = 0.621 mi
