= Port Kent and Hopkinton Turnpike =

Toll road in New York, United States

Route information
- Length: 75 mi (121 km)
- Existed: 1833–1838

Major junctions
- West end: Hopkinton, New York
- East end: Port Kent, New York

Location
- Country: United States
- State: New York
- Counties: St. Lawrence, Franklin, Clinton, Essex

Highway system
- New York Highways; Interstate; US; State; Reference; Parkways

The Port Kent and Hopkinton Turnpike was a 19th-century toll road in the North Country of New York in the United States. It began in the town of Hopkinton and ended at the hamlet of Port Kent, located on the western shore of Lake Champlain. The turnpike was constructed in the early 1830s and was completed in 1833. The tolls along the road were removed just five years later; however, parts of the former turnpike later became the basis for several 20th-century state highways. One, the former New York State Route 99 (NY 99), is still known today as the "Port Kent–Hopkinton Turnpike".

== Route description ==
The Port Kent and Hopkinton Turnpike began in Nicholville, a small hamlet situated adjacent to the town of Hopkinton on the northern banks of the St. Regis River in the St. Lawrence County town of Lawrence. It headed eastward on what is now Port Kent and Red Tavern Roads through Saint Regis Falls to the town of Duane. Between the hamlets of Duane Center and Merrillsville (the latter in the town of Franklin), it followed modern County Route 26 (CR 26), formerly State Route 99, through Franklin County. CR 26 is still known today as the "Port Kent–Hopkinton Turnpike" and is one of only two highways along the turnpike's routing that still makes reference to the old toll road.

From Franklin to Au Sable Forks, the Port Kent and Hopkinton Turnpike used a series of roadways that are now primarily local roads. It continued eastward from modern NY 3 on Alder Brook Park and Brook Roads to the hamlet of Union Falls, situated near the Franklin–Clinton county line. East of Union Falls, it proceeded on what is now Union Falls, Silver Lake, Turnpike, and Guide Board Roads through rural portions of Clinton County to the more populous Au Sable Forks. Northeast of Au Sable Forks, the turnpike followed what is now a series of state-maintained highways. Most of the highway—from Au Sable Forks to Keeseville—is now part of NY 9N. Past Keeseville, the routing of the turnpike continued to the hamlet of Port Kent on modern U.S. Route 9 (US 9) and NY 373.

== History ==
The idea of constructing a highway leading southward from St. Lawrence County was first conceived as early as the beginning of the 19th century. Several different roadways were built; however, all ultimately fell into disuse after several years. On April 16, 1827, a team of three surveyors were commissioned to determine a routing for a new highway leading from Hopkinton, a town in northeastern St. Lawrence County, to Lake Champlain. The surveying and leveling took 26 days and was completed by late October of that year. Contemporary newspapers claimed that the chosen route avoided all "hills of any magnitude".

On April 18, 1829, the New York State Legislature passed an act that allowed construction to begin on the highway, which was to begin at Hopkinton and end at Port Kent on the western shore of Lake Champlain. As part of the act, the state of New York allocated $25,836 (equivalent to $781,135 in 2025) toward the construction of the road and levied a tax on all land located within three miles of the proposed route, which would raise an additional $12,500 (equivalent to $377,930 in 2025) for the project. Construction began later that year and was completed in 1832. The 75-mile (121 km) highway opened in 1833 as a toll road named the Port Kent and Hopkinton Turnpike.

Under the original text of the 1829 act, only one toll gate was permitted on the turnpike. On January 16, 1835, the commissioners of the Port Kent and Hopkinton Turnpike filed a petition in the New York State Senate requesting that the turnpike be allowed to replace the one toll gate with two "half toll gates"; that is, two toll gates charging half of the normal amount of toll. The original toll gate was placed near the midpoint of the turnpike; however, the commissioners indicated that most of the traffic used only small portions of the highway near each end, resulting in a loss of toll revenue. Thus, the commissioners desired to place two half toll gates closer to the endpoints of the route.

A bill was introduced in the State Senate shortly afterward that, if passed, would allow the turnpike to have two half toll gates. It was passed by the Senate on January 20, 1835, and by the New York State Assembly on February 2, 1835. The bill was signed into law by Governor William L. Marcy on February 4, 1835. Ultimately, the change in toll gate locations did little to improve the financial standing of the turnpike. On March 30, 1838, a law went into effect that stipulated that maintenance of the Port Kent and Hopkinton Turnpike would be transferred to the towns it ran within and that the roadway would be maintained using public highway funds, effectively dissolving the toll road.

Portions of the former turnpike were later acquired by the state of New York and added to the state highway system. By 1930, the portion from Au Sable Forks to Ausable Chasm had a route number; two more sections—Duane (at Duane Center) to Franklin (Merrillsville) and Ausable Chasm to Port Kent—gained a designation as part of the 1930 renumbering of state highways in New York. Of the four designations that occupied parts of the turnpike's former routing in 1930—US 9, NY 9N, NY 99, and NY 373—three still exist today. NY 99 was removed in 1994.

== See also ==
- List of turnpikes in New York
