= Taylor Pond (New York) =

- Location within New York Location within the United States
- Location: Town of Black Brook
- Coordinates: 44°29′02″N 73°51′40″W
- Type: Lake
- Basin countries: United States
- First flooded: First: Early 1800s; Second: 1925
- Max. length: 3.1 miles (5.0 km)
- Max. width: 0.7 miles (1.1 km)
- Surface area: 856 acres (346 ha)
- Max. depth: 95 feet (29 m)
- Shore length^{1}: 8.6 miles (13.8 km)
- Surface elevation: 1,398 feet (426 m)
- Frozen: Yearly
- Islands: 0
- ^{1} Shore length is not a well-defined measure.

Taylor Pond is a lake located in Clinton County, New York in the Adirondack Park. It is located within, and is the namesake of, the Taylor Pond Wild Forest. The lake has public access via a DEC campground, which includes a beach ramp boat launch. Taylor Pond is surrounded by public land, with no camps located on the lake.

== Recreation ==
Recreation on the lake includes boating, camping, fishing and hiking.

=== Camping ===
The DEC-run campground is open during summers and offers 30 campsites. Of the 30 sites, 25 are drive-in sites, 2 are boat-only-access tent sites, and 3 are boat-only-access lean-to sites. The campground has no swimming area, flush bathrooms or other amenities.

=== Boating ===
The DEC operates a year-round boat launch open to the public. During campground season, kayak and canoe rentals are available.

=== Fishing ===
The lake is stocked with 1200 lake trout, 600 Landlocked salmon and 50-75 surplus brood stock from Adirondack Fish Hatchery. Other species include: lake trout, landlocked salmon, brown bullhead, pumpkinseed, yellow perch, and rainbow smelt. Ice fishing is not permitted.

=== Hiking ===
A 12 mile snowmobile trail surrounds the lake, with connections to the regional snowmobile trail network.
