= Elkanah Watson House =

Historic house in New York, United States

- U.S. National Register of Historic Places
- U.S. National Historic Landmark
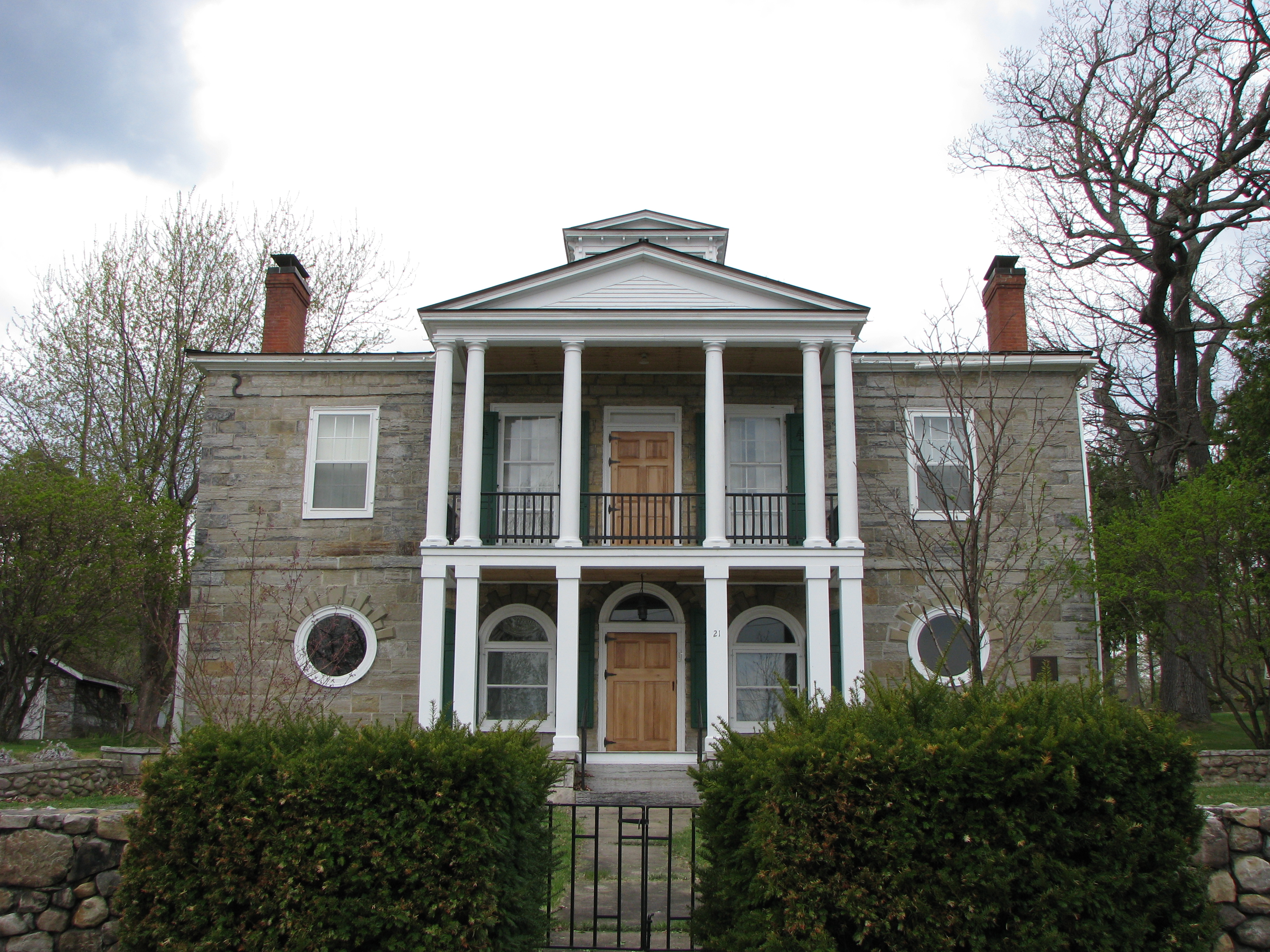
- Elkanah Watson House, Port Kent, 2009

- Location within New York Location within the United States
- Location: Lake and South Streets, Port Kent, New York
- Coordinates: 44°31′29.81″N 73°24′21.12″W
- Area: 1.5 acres (0.61 ha)
- Built: 1828
- Architect: Sheldon & Merritt
- NRHP reference No.: 66000518

Significant dates
- Added to NRHP: October 15, 1966
- Designated NHL: July 19, 1964

The Elkanah Watson House is a historic house at Lake and South Streets in Port Kent, New York. Built in 1828, it was the home of Elkanah Watson (1758–1842), a businessman and diplomat best known for founding and promoting the idea of agricultural fairs. This house, still a private residence, was his home until his death. It was designated a National Historic Landmark in 1964.

== Description and history ==
The Elkanah Watson House stands overlooking Lake Champlain to the east, at the southwest corner of Lake and South Streets in the village of Port Kent. It is a basically square two-story masonry structure, built out of ashlar granite. It is covered by a truncated hip roof with a square belvedere at its center. Its front facade is five bays wide, with the center three sheltered by a two-story projecting portico with round columns supporting a pedimented gable. There are distinctive round windows on the ground floor in the outer bays. A porte-cochere of similar design but only a single story in height projects from the center of the south facade.

The house was built in 1828 to a design by Sheldon & Merritt. It was constructed under the supervision of Charles Watson as the residence of his father, Elkanah Watson. It was the centerpiece of Watson's 5,000-acre property on the lake, of which pieces were later sold off for development. He occupied the house in May 1828 and also operated a farm on his property. The house was later the residence of Winslow C. Watson, one of his sons and a historian who completed Elkanah's autobiography. Elkanah Watson is buried in the family cemetery located near the house. Most outbuildings from the time the property was a working farm have been removed.

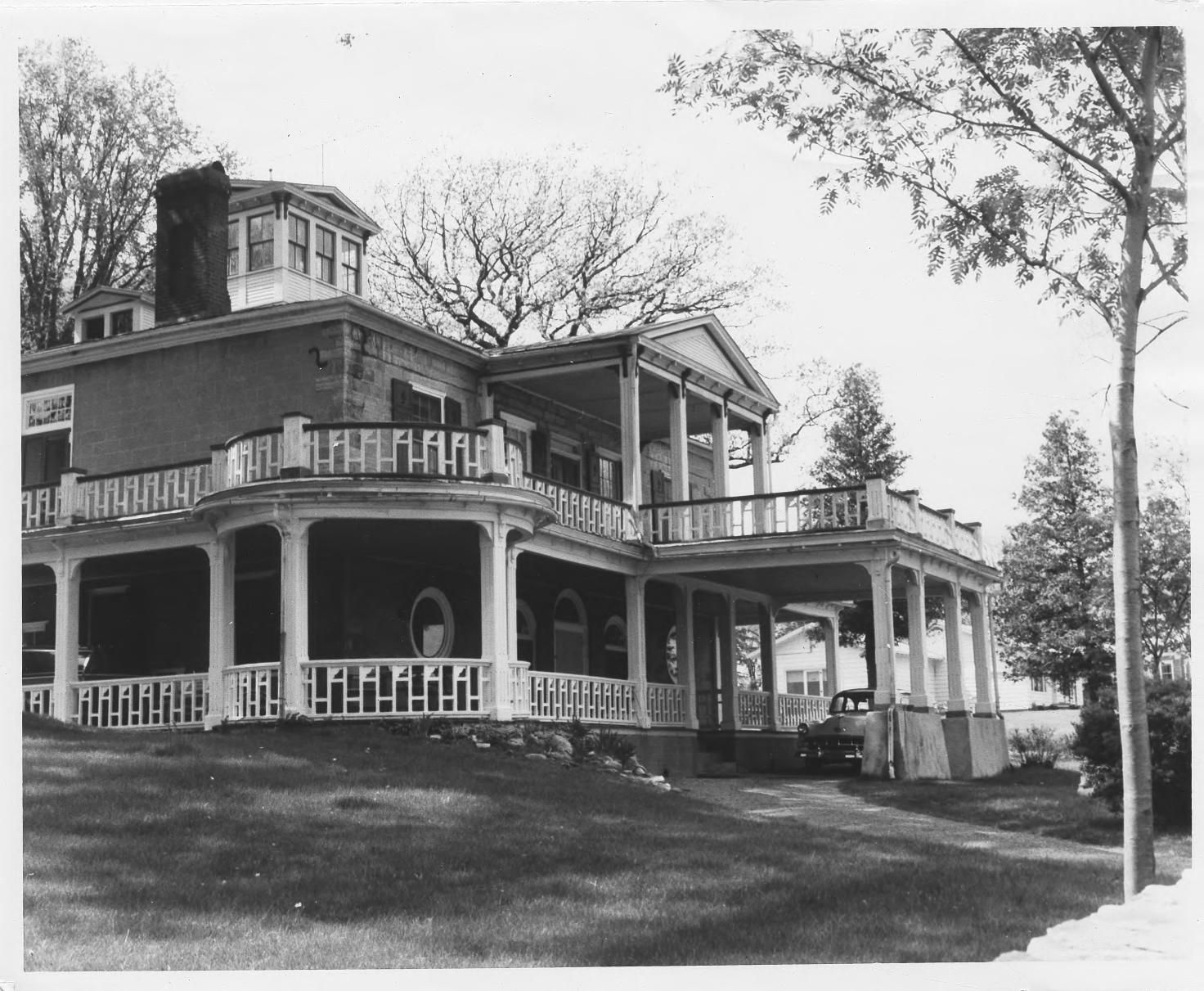
House facing east, with porch wrapping to the south, 1963

Elkanah Watson was a Revolutionary-era diplomat, banker and businessman, and an early promoter of canals in New York State. He is best known as the founder of the agricultural fair, which he developed to stimulate competition and best practices. He developed this idea while living in Pittsfield, Massachusetts, out of an incident where he tethered two merino sheep to a tree on the town common. The then-unusual animals drew a great deal of attention, prompting Watson to develop the idea of a broader fair, at which animals could be exhibited, and agricultural methods and practices could be shared. The first fair was held in Pittsfield in 1810.

== See also ==
- List of National Historic Landmarks in New York
- National Register of Historic Places listings in Essex County, New York
