= Elkanah Watson =

American writer (1758–1842)

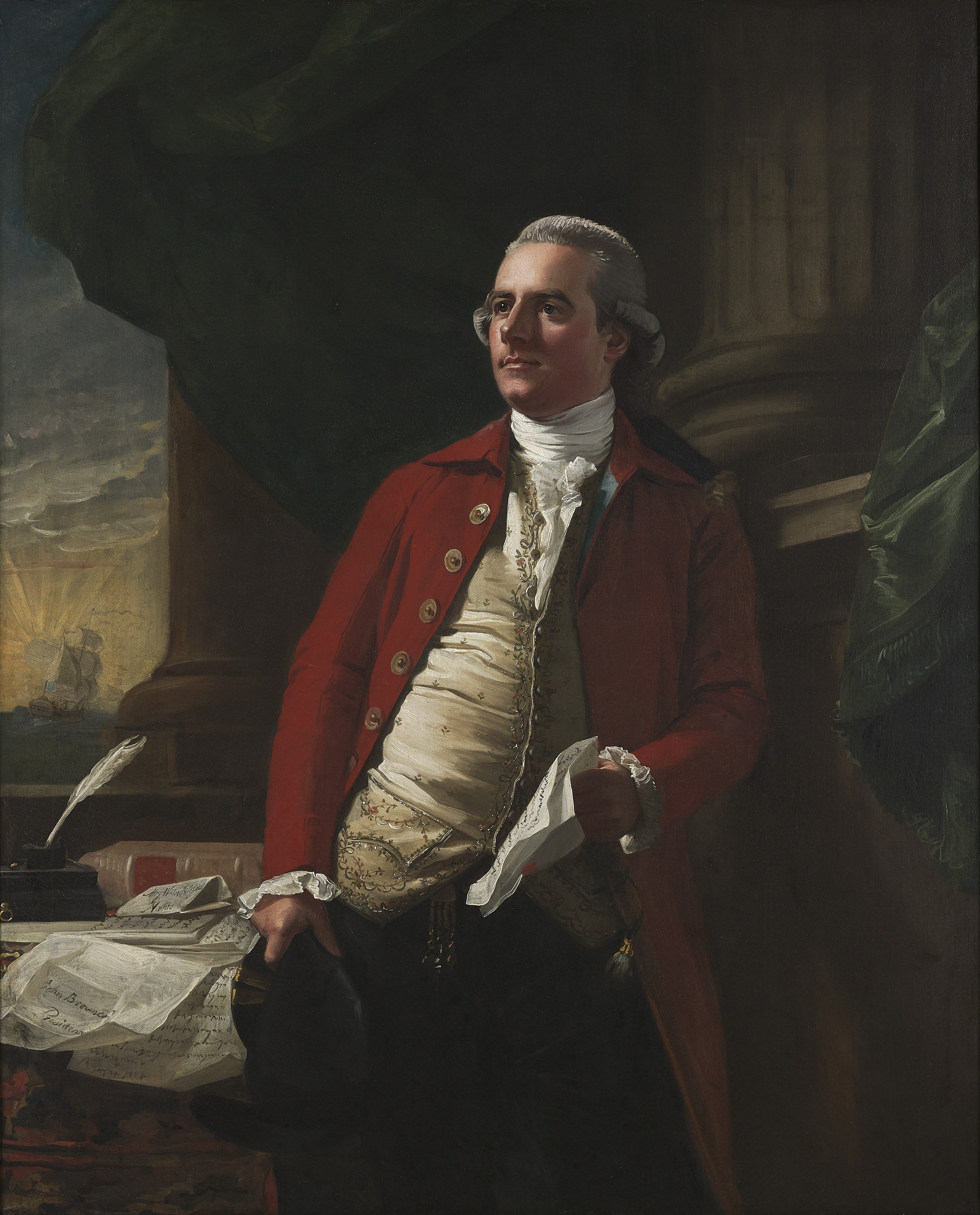
John Singleton Copley, Elkanah Watson, 1782, in the Princeton University Art Museum. The ship in the background represents the departure to America of the acknowledgement of the independence of the United States.

Elkanah Watson (January 22, 1758 – December 5, 1842) was an American agriculturist, writer, banker, and businessman. He was born in Plymouth, Massachusetts and died at Port Kent, New York. He worked in Albany, New York for several years, founding the State Bank of Albany. After retiring in 1807 to a farm in Massachusetts, he raised Merino sheep and founded the agricultural fair, first organizing one at Pittsfield.

Based on journals which he had kept since his 20s, Watson started writing his autobiography in 1821. It was completed, edited and published as Men and the Times of the Revolution; or Memoirs of Elkanah Watson (1856) by one of his sons, historian Winslow Cossoul Watson.

== Early life and education ==
Elkanah Watson was born, raised and educated in Plymouth, Massachusetts. In 1774 he was apprenticed to the mercantile firm of John Brown in Providence, Rhode Island. His family business empire included interests in the Triangle Trade, and Brown was a slave trader. Watson was entrusted with increasingly responsible projects and in 1778 at the age of 20, he carried $50,000 sewn into his clothes, to deliver to Brown's southern agents in Charleston, South Carolina. His 1200-mile journey took him 77 days. After delivering the money, Watson set off with two companions to explore Georgia and Florida, and during this journey started keeping a journal, a practice which he maintained for decades.

After completing his indenture in 1779, Watson continued to work for the Browns. During the American Revolutionary War, Watson carried Brown's dispatches overseas to statesman Benjamin Franklin in France, who was working to secure French support. Watson became a Freemason in France during the war, and went into business in Nantes with a Frenchman, François Cossoul. They opened a branch in London before suffering reverses. Later they commissioned a Masonic apron for George Washington.

After his return to the United States, in 1785 Watson settled in Edenton, North Carolina, joined by Cossoul who had immigrated. They were successful in business until undone by a financial recession.

Moving to Albany, New York in 1789, Watson invested in upstate land and businesses. This territory was being plotted, sold and developed for the first time by European-American settlers, as the Iroquois League had been forced to cede most of their lands following their ally Britain's defeat in the American Revolution. In December 1791, he proposed to the New York State legislature that natural waterways could be used to create what later became the Erie Canal across New York State, connecting the Hudson River and New York City with the Great Lakes. Later he competed with Dewitt Clinton for the credit for this concept. In 1792, with General Philip Schuyler, Watson formed a company to build locks and canals, starting with the canal at Little Falls, New York, about halfway through the Mohawk Valley where the river had rapids that prevented through traffic.

Watson was on the board of the Bank of Albany, but was removed for his progressive ideas, including support of free schools, stage lines and turnpikes. He founded the State Bank of Albany in 1803, which proved highly profitable, so much so that he retired within a few years to pursue agricultural interests.

In 1807 Watson moved to Pittsfield, Massachusetts to raise Merino sheep at his farm. To promote better agricultural practices, he organized the first county fair in the United States, at Pittsfield in 1810, with the goal of stimulating competition and use of best practices. He developed the fair with activities for men, women and children, to involve all of the community.

Watson was elected a member of the American Antiquarian Society in 1815.

== Marriage and family ==
He married and had two daughters and three sons, Emily Morisceau Watson, Mary Lucia Watson, George Elkanah Watson, Charles Marston Watson and Winslow Cossoul Watson, named after his good friend and business partner. Photographer Yvette Borup Andrews was Elkanah Watson's great-great granddaughter.

== Legacy ==
- His papers are held by the New York State Library.
- His Elkanah Watson House in Port Kent, New York has been designated as a National Historic Landmark.
