= Duane Methodist Episcopal Church =

Historic church in New York, United States

- U.S. National Register of Historic Places
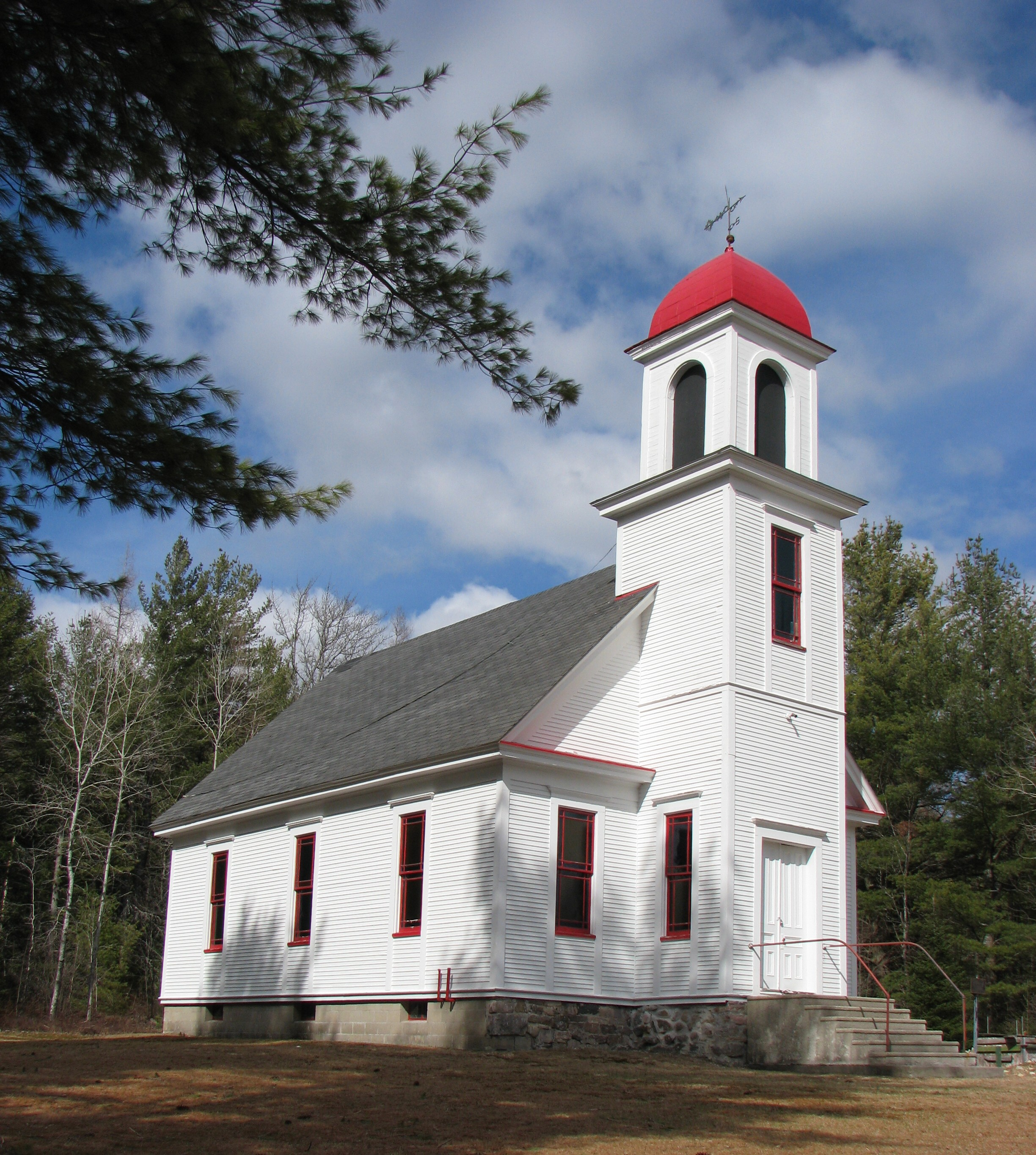
- Duane Methodist Episcopal Church

- Location within New York Location within the United States
- Location: NY 26 E of jct. with Kenny Rd., Duane, New York
- Coordinates: 44°39′34″N 74°15′46″W
- Area: less than one acre
- Built: 1883-1885
- Architectural style: Late 19th And 20th Century Revivals
- NRHP reference No.: 91001027
- Added to NRHP: August 9, 1991

The Duane Methodist Episcopal Church is a historic Methodist Episcopal church located at Duane, Franklin County, New York.

== History ==
The church was built between 1883 and 1885. The church was in use for almost a century, and in the 1940s the Town of Duane began storing archives in the basement and also using the basement as a polling station.

In 1982, the church was closed due to declining membership and funds. It was purchased by the town, and since then has been used for meetings, weddings, and other events.

== Architecture ==
The Romanesque Revival architectural design of the church draws from a New England meeting house design. The rounded dome of the steeple with the arches of the cupola is modeled after Christopher Wren's work, and is typical of New England meeting houses. Double doors lead into the vestibule of birch and maple. Double oak doors allow for entry into the main chapel. The walls and ceiling graduate from twelve feet to seventeen feet in height. There are eight stained glass windows (6'6" x 32") and square nails are used in the fluting frames of these windows. The walls are of birch and maple combined with wainscoting.

It was listed on the National Register of Historic Places in 1991.
