= Debar Pond Lodge =

- U.S. National Register of Historic Places
- U.S. Historic district
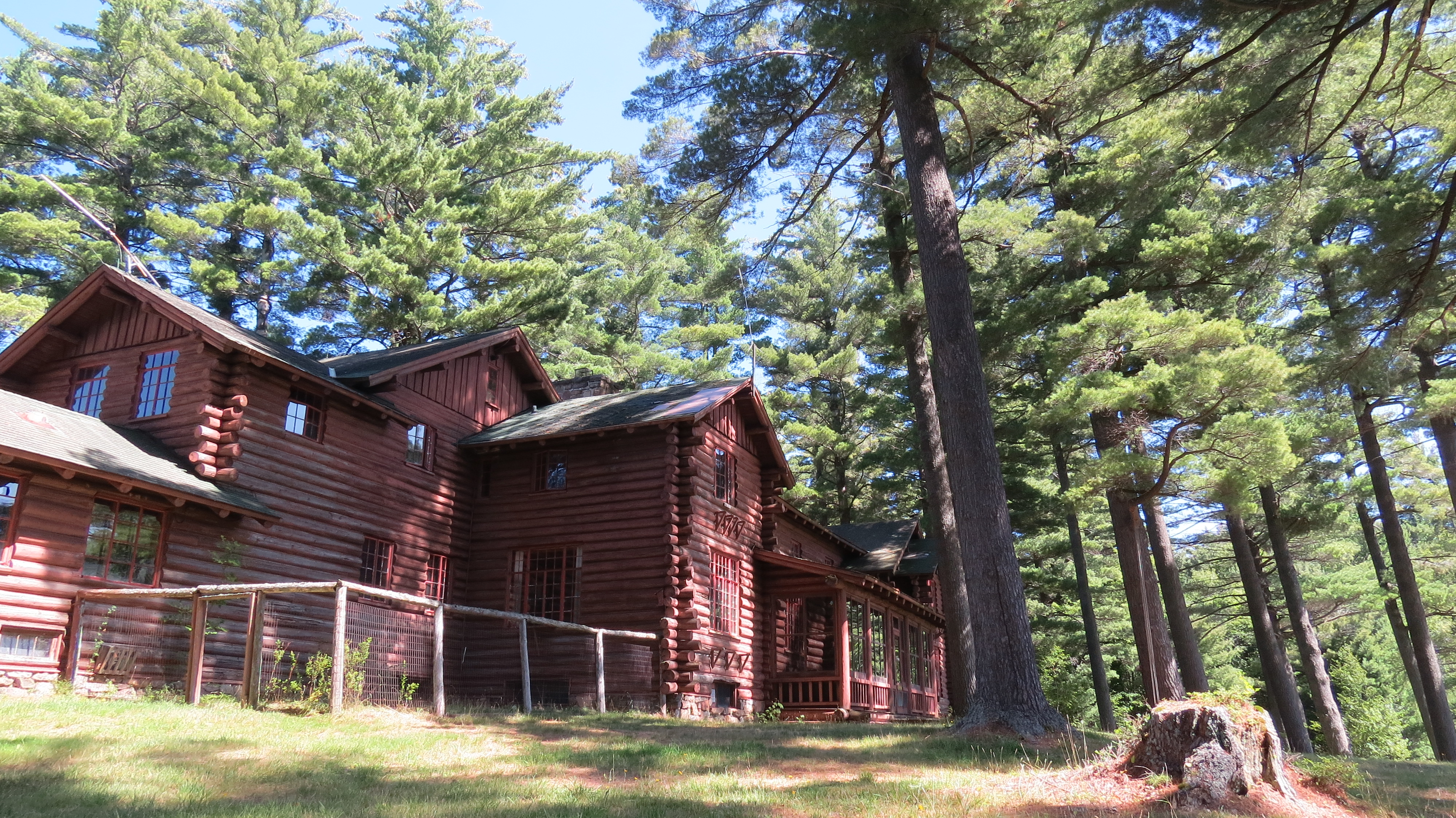
- Debar Pond Lodge, September 2, 2017

- Location within New York Location within the United States
- Location: Debar Park Road, Duane, New York
- Coordinates: 44°52′05″N 74°12′56″W
- Area: 1,118.95 acres (452.82 ha)
- Built: c. 1939-1940, 1959
- Architect: Distin, William G.
- Architectural style: Rustic
- NRHP reference No.: 14001048
- Added to NRHP: December 16, 2014

Debar Pond Lodge is a historic Great Camp and national historic district located within the Adirondack Forest Preserve at Duane in Franklin County, New York. The camp was designed by William G. Distin and built about 1940. The main lodge is a rambling two-story, Rustic style building of light-frame construction with an exterior veneer of half and full round logs. The interior features a centrally located, two-story Great Room. Also on the property are the contributing boathouse; a guide house/garage; a generator house; a barn; a shed; a greenhouse and potting shed; and stone posts which mark the associated stone-lined walkway to the lodge's principal entrance. The property was privately owned until 2004, and is now a part of the Adirondack Forest Preserve and under the management and control of the New York State Department of Environmental Conservation.

It was listed on the National Register of Historic Places in 2014.
