= Poke-O-Moonshine Mountain Fire Observation Station =

- U.S. National Register of Historic Places
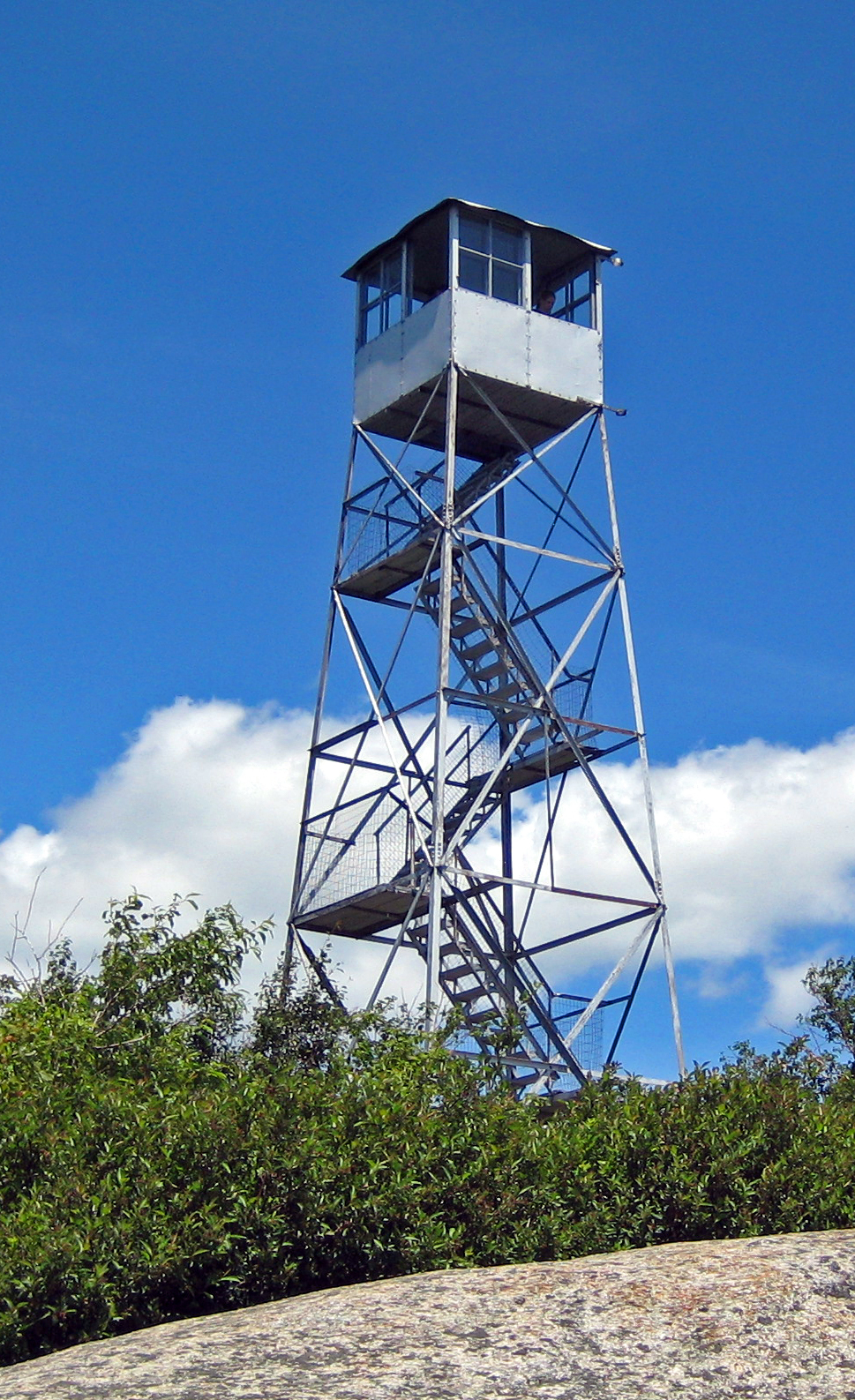
- Tower in 2008

- Location within New York Location within the United States
- Location: Poke-O-Moonshine Mountain, Chesterfield, New York
- Coordinates: 44°23′16″N 73°30′29″W
- Area: 3.6 acres (1.5 ha)
- Built: 1917
- Architect: Aermotor Corporation
- MPS: Fire Observation Stations of New York State Forest Preserve MPS
- NRHP reference No.: 01001034
- Added to NRHP: September 23, 2001

The Poke-O-Moonshine Mountain Fire Observation Station is a historic fire lookout tower on Poke-O-Moonshine Mountain at Chesterfield in Essex County, New York. The station and contributing resources include a 40-foot-tall (12 m), steel-frame lookout tower erected in 1917, a jeep trail that extends from the base of the mountain to a point below its summit, the remains of an observer's cabin possibly built by the Civilian Conservation Corps in 1936, and a spring house. The tower is a prefabricated structure built by the Aermotor Windmill Company.

It was added to the National Register of Historic Places in 2001.

== See also ==
- National Register of Historic Places listings in Essex County, New York
