= Duane, New York =

- Town
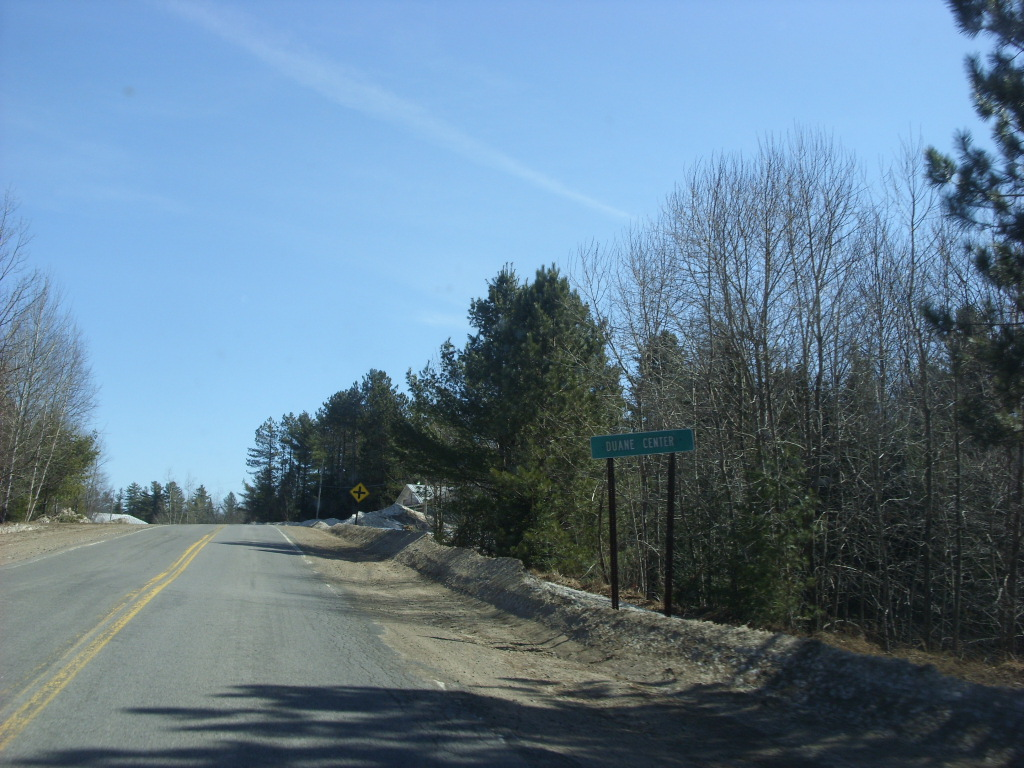
- Former NYS Rt. 99 in Duane Center, NY

- Location within the state of New York
- Coordinates: 44°37′59″N 74°16′46″W
- Country: United States
- State: New York
- County: Franklin
- Named after: James Duane

Government
  - Type: Town Council
  - Town Supervisor: Edward J. Lemieux, Sr. (R)
  - Town Council: Members' List: • Peter Biesemyer (D); • Mark A. Young (D); • Michelle Asselin (R); • Carmella Teeple (R)

Area
  - Total: 77.98 sq mi (201.98 km^{2})
  - Land: 74.95 sq mi (194.12 km^{2})
  - Water: 3.03 sq mi (7.85 km^{2})
- Elevation: 1,480 ft (451 m)

Population (2010)
  - Total: 174
  - Estimate (2016): 179
  - Density: 2.4/sq mi (0.92/km^{2})
- Time zone: UTC-5 (Eastern (EST))
  - Summer (DST): UTC-4 (EDT)
- ZIP Code: 12953 (Malone)
- Area code: 518
- FIPS code: 36-033-20973
- GNIS feature ID: 0978909

Duane is a town in Franklin County, New York, United States. The population was 174 at the 2010 census. The town is named after James Duane, a developer and grandson of New York City mayor James Duane.

The town of Duane is within the Adirondack Park at the geographic center of the county.

== History ==
The town of Duane was formed in 1828 from part of the town of Malone. One of the first endeavors was the processing of iron ore. The town is named after James Duane, a proprietor and first colonizer.

The Meacham Lake Hotel was a popular tourist resort until it closed in 1921. The land was purchased by New York State and converted to a campground by the Civilian Conservation Corps.

Former New York State Route 99 was converted to County Road 26 in 1994. Gordon's Crossing is located at the intersection of old Rt. 99 and County Road 26.

The Duane Methodist Episcopal Church and Debar Pond Lodge are listed on the National Register of Historic Places.

== Geography ==
According to the United States Census Bureau, the town has a total area of 78.0 square miles (202.0 km^{2}), of which 74.9 square miles (194.1 km^{2}) is land and 3.1 square miles (7.9 km^{2}), or 3.89%, is water. The largest water body is Meacham Lake, in the southern part of town. Deer River Flow is located in the northwest. Most of the town is part of the Deer River watershed, a northward-flowing tributary of the St. Regis River, which flows to the St. Lawrence River in Canada. The eastern edge of the town is part of the Salmon River watershed, which flows north through Malone and then to the St. Lawrence in Canada.

New York State Route 30 is a north-south highway. New York State Route 458 intersects NY-30 at the southern town line, by Meacham Lake.

== Demographics ==
Historical population
| Census | Pop. | Note | %± |
|---|---|---|---|
| 1830 | 247 | | — |
| 1840 | 324 | | 31.2% |
| 1850 | 222 | | −31.5% |
| 1860 | 279 | | 25.7% |
| 1870 | 234 | | −16.1% |
| 1880 | 285 | | 21.8% |
| 1890 | 421 | | 47.7% |
| 1900 | 312 | | −25.9% |
| 1910 | 300 | | −3.8% |
| 1920 | 209 | | −30.3% |
| 1930 | 177 | | −15.3% |
| 1940 | 121 | | −31.6% |
| 1950 | 117 | | −3.3% |
| 1960 | 95 | | −18.8% |
| 1970 | 111 | | 16.8% |
| 1980 | 184 | | 65.8% |
| 1990 | 152 | | −17.4% |
| 2000 | 159 | | 4.6% |
| 2010 | 174 | | 9.4% |
| 2016 (est.) | 179 | | 2.9% |
U.S. Decennial Census

As of the census of 2000, there were 159 people, 72 households, and 47 families residing in the town. The population density was 2.1 inhabitants per square mile (0.81/km^{2}). There were 231 housing units at an average density of 3.1 per square mile (1.2/km^{2}). The racial makeup of the town was 98.11% White, 0.63% Native American, 1.26% from other races. Hispanic or Latino of any race were 1.26% of the population.

There were 72 households, out of which 20.8% had children under the age of 18 living with them, 55.6% were married couples living together, 6.9% had a female householder with no husband present, and 34.7% were non-families. 29.2% of all households were made up of individuals, and 6.9% had someone living alone who was 65 years of age or older. The average household size was 2.21 and the average family size was 2.70. The name is that of James Duane.

In the town, the population was spread out, with 17.0% under the age of 18, 3.8% from 18 to 24, 24.5% from 25 to 44, 35.2% from 45 to 64, and 19.5% who were 65 years of age or older. The median age was 47 years. For every 100 females, there were 98.8 males. For every 100 females age 18 and over, there were 100.0 males.

The median income for a household in the town was $37,500, and the median income for a family was $38,750. Males had a median income of $29,500 versus $21,458 for females. The per capita income for the town was $19,130. About 10.2% of families and 14.5% of the population were below the poverty line, including 21.4% of those under the age of eighteen and none of those 65 or over.

== Communities and locations in Duane ==
- Clear Pond – A lake north of Meacham Lake.
- Deer River – A stream flowing northward from the town.
- Deer River Flow – A lake formed on the Deer River near the northern town line.
- Duane Center – A hamlet in the north-central part of the town on County Road 26, west of NY-30.
- Meacham Lake – A lake by the southern town line next to NY-30, named after Thomas Meacham.
- Meacham Lake Campground – A public camping area at the northern end of Meacham Lake.
- Debar Pond Lodge – A former Great Camp on Debar Pond.

== Climate ==
The Köppen Climate Classification sub-type for this climate is "Dfb" (Warm Summer Continental Climate).

Climate data for Duane, New York
| Month | Jan | Feb | Mar | Apr | May | Jun | Jul | Aug | Sep | Oct | Nov | Dec | Year |
|---|---|---|---|---|---|---|---|---|---|---|---|---|---|
| Mean daily maximum °C (°F) | −2 (28) | −1 (30) | 3 (37) | 11 (51) | 19 (66) | 24 (75) | 26 (78) | 24 (75) | 20 (68) | 14 (57) | 6 (42) | −1 (30) | 11 (51) |
| Mean daily minimum °C (°F) | −14 (6) | −14 (6) | −7 (19) | 0 (32) | 5 (41) | 10 (50) | 12 (53) | 11 (51) | 7 (44) | 2 (35) | −2 (28) | −11 (12) | 0 (32) |
| Average precipitation mm (inches) | 66 (2.6) | 61 (2.4) | 71 (2.8) | 81 (3.2) | 91 (3.6) | 97 (3.8) | 100 (4.1) | 110 (4.3) | 97 (3.8) | 91 (3.6) | 91 (3.6) | 81 (3.2) | 1,070 (42.1) |
Source: Weatherbase
