= Port Kent, New York =

Hamlet in New York, United States

Coordinates: 44°31′41″N 73°24′25″W

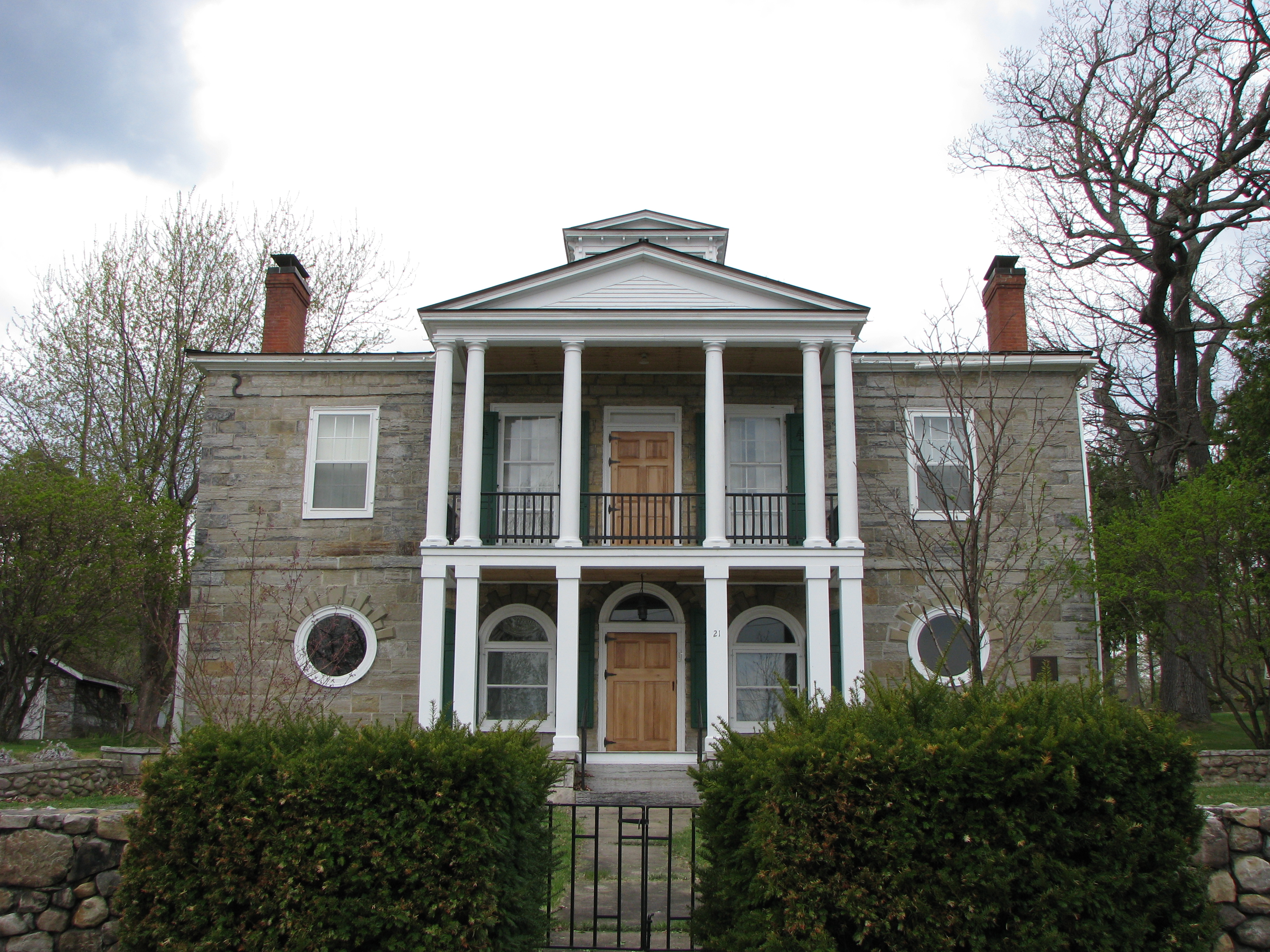
Elkanah Watson House

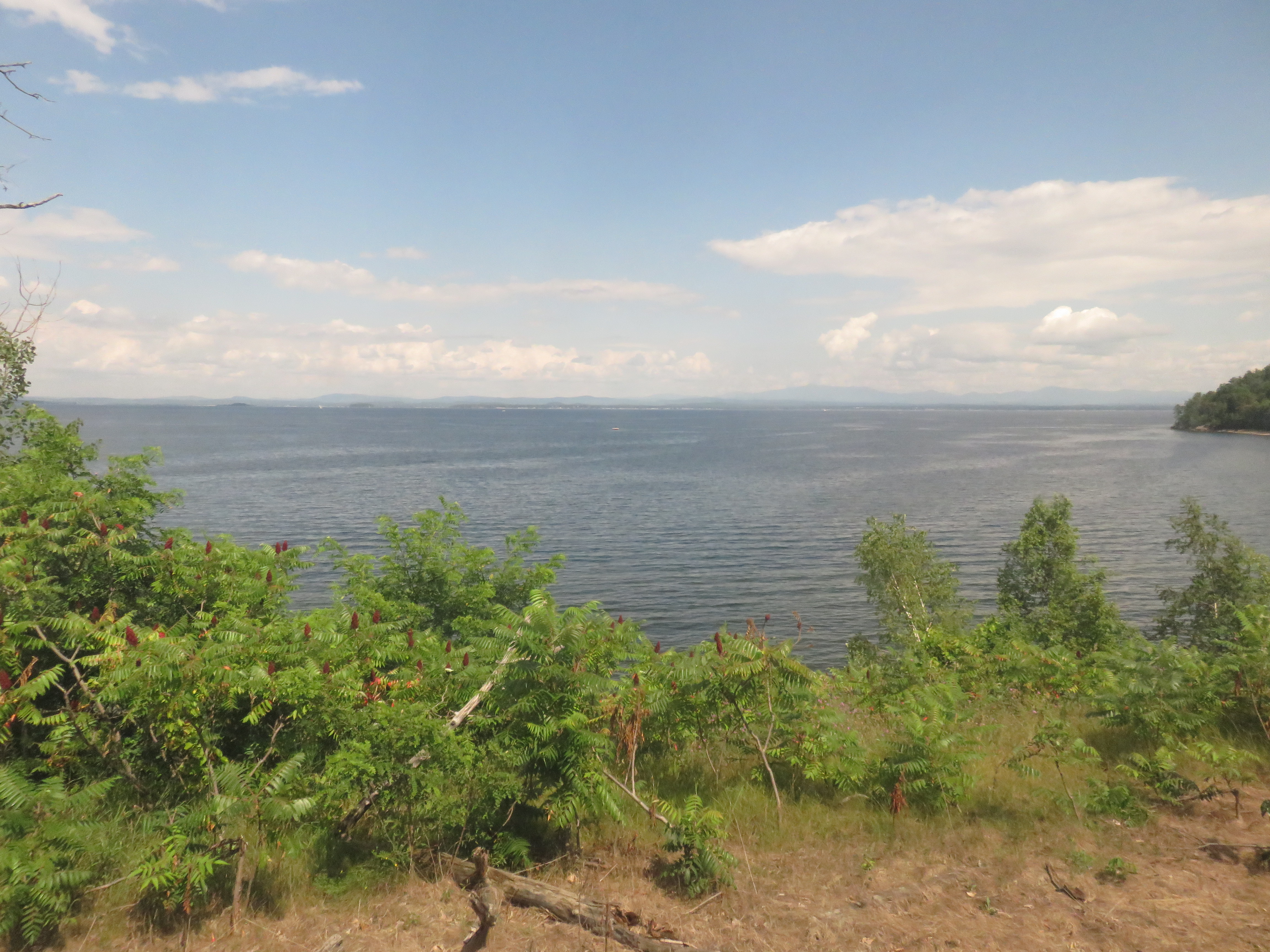
Lake Champlain near Port Kent

Port Kent is a hamlet within the town of Chesterfield, Essex County, New York, United States, on the western shore of Lake Champlain. Its population was last recorded as 217 (141 households). Its ZIP code is 12975.

Seasonal ferry service to Burlington, Vermont, was provided by the Lake Champlain Transportation Company. The community has an Amtrak railroad stop for seasonal service between Montreal and New York City as well. However, the ferry service has been suspended, resulting in the station being in a state of limbo.

Port Kent is the site of the Elkanah Watson House, a National Historic Landmark. Watson lived here following the American Revolution. A postwar entrepreneur, he promoted settlement and development of businesses, the construction of canals through the state, and founded the State Bank of Albany. After moving to his farm in Massachusetts, he established the first state fair in the new country, held in Pittsfield.
