= Chesterfield, New York =

- Town
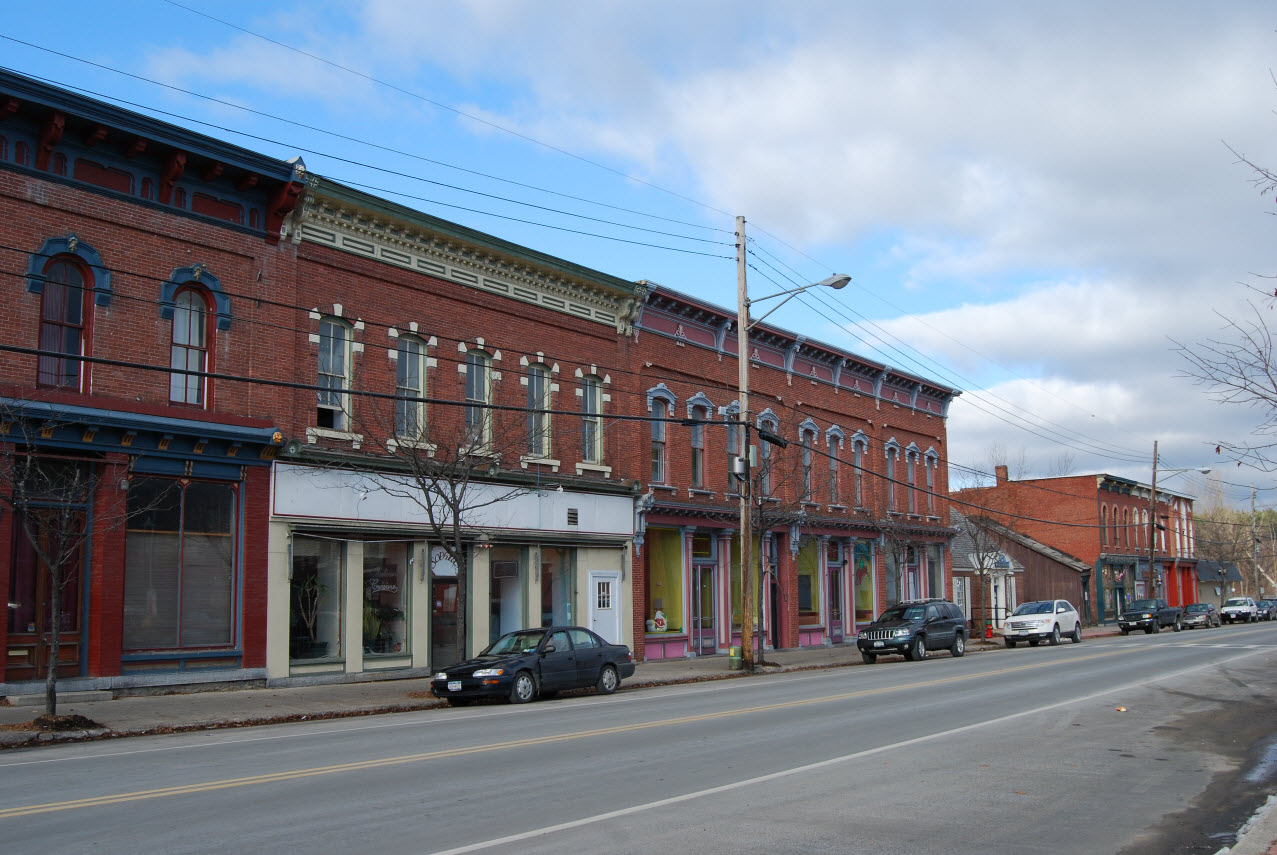
- Hamlet and CDP of Keeseville in Chesterfield

- Location in Essex County and the state of New York
- Coordinates: 44°28′13″N 73°28′40″W
- Country: United States
- State: New York
- County: Essex

Government
  - Type: Town Council
  - Town Supervisor: Clayton J. Barber (R)
  - Town Council: Members' List: • David P. Gload (R); • John S. Casey (I); • Richard J. Klages (D); • Bill Mitchell (D)
  - Tax Collector: Bruce Bourgeois Jr. (D)

Area
  - Total: 105.37 sq mi (272.91 km^{2})
  - Land: 79.03 sq mi (204.69 km^{2})
  - Water: 26.34 sq mi (68.21 km^{2})
- Elevation: 673 ft (205 m)

Population (2020)
  - Total: 2,476
  - Density: 29.9/sq mi (11.56/km^{2})
- Time zone: UTC-5 (Eastern (EST))
  - Summer (DST): UTC-4 (EDT)
- ZIP Codes: 12944 (Keeseville); 12975 (Port Kent); 12911 (Ausable Chasm)
- FIPS code: 36-031-15330
- GNIS feature ID: 0978824
- Website: chesterfieldny.gov

Chesterfield is a town in Essex County, New York, United States. The population was 2,445 at the 2010 census. The name possibly is from a location in New England.

Chesterfield is in the northeasternmost part of the county and is 13 miles (21 km) west of Burlington, Vermont (by ferry), 16 mi (26 km) south of Plattsburgh, 77 mi (124 km) south of Montreal, Quebec, and 144 mi (232 km) north of Albany.

The town is entirely inside the Adirondack Park.

== History ==
The town was formed in 1802 from part of the town of Willsboro. The early settlers were from the New England area.

Poke-O-Moonshine Mountain Fire Observation Station was added to the National Register of Historic Places in 2001.

== Geography ==
According to the United States Census Bureau, the town has a total area of 105.4 square miles (272.9 km^{2}), of which 79.0 sq mi (204.7 km^{2}) is land and 26.3 sq mi (68.2 km^{2}), or 24.99%, is water.

The northern town line is the border of Clinton County, consisting of the Ausable River, and the eastern town line is marked by Lake Champlain and Vermont.

Interstate 87, the Northway, is a major divided highway running north–south through Chesterfield. US Route 9 and New York State Route 22 are north–south highways adjacent to the Interstate.

Ferry service is seasonally available between Port Kent and Burlington, Vermont.

== Demographics ==
Historical population
Census	Pop.	Note	%±
1820	667		—
1830	1,671		150.5%
1840	2,716		62.5%
1850	4,171		53.6%
1860	3,179		−23.8%
1870	2,795		−12.1%
1880	2,752		−1.5%
1890	2,548		−7.4%
1900	2,362		−7.3%
1910	1,829		−22.6%
1920	1,538		−15.9%
1930	1,599		4.0%
1940	1,694		5.9%
1950	1,903		12.3%
1960	2,003		5.3%
1970	2,010		0.3%
1980	2,398		19.3%
1990	2,267		−5.5%
2000	2,409		6.3%
2010	2,445		1.5%
2020	2,476		1.3%
U.S. Decennial Census

As of the census of 2000, there were 2,409 people, 948 households, and 678 families residing in the town. The population density was 30.6 inhabitants per square mile (11.8/km^{2}). There were 1,374 housing units at an average density of 17.4 per square mile (6.7/km^{2}). The racial makeup of the town was 97.76% White, 0.25% African American, 0.21% Native American, 0.21% Asian, 0.58% from other races, and 1.00% from two or more races. Hispanic or Latino of any race were 0.87% of the population.

There were 948 households, out of which 32.3% had children under the age of 18 living with them, 57.3% were married couples living together, 10.0% had a female householder with no husband present, and 28.4% were non-families. 21.1% of all households were made up of individuals, and 9.2% had someone living alone who was 65 years of age or older. The average household size was 2.52 and the average family size was 2.93.

In the town, the population was spread out, with 24.4% under the age of 18, 7.3% from 18 to 24, 28.8% from 25 to 44, 26.9% from 45 to 64, and 12.6% who were 65 years of age or older. The median age was 40 years. For every 100 females, there were 95.7 males. For every 100 females age 18 and over, there were 94.8 males.

The median income for a household in the town was $39,875, and the median income for a family was $43,015. Males had a median income of $36,417 versus $25,156 for females. The per capita income for the town was $18,421. About 9.1% of families and 12.8% of the population were below the poverty line, including 19.5% of those under age 18 and 6.0% of those age 65 or over.

== Communities and locations in Chesterfield ==
=== Communities and inhabited locations ===
- Keeseville – A hamlet on the northern border of the town at US-9 and NY-22. It extends north into the town of AuSable and Clinton County.
- Port Douglas – A hamlet in the eastern part of the town, located on the shore of Lake Champlain at Corlear Bay and on County Road 16.
- Port Kent – A hamlet in the northeastern corner of the town on Lake Champlain.

=== Geographical and similar locations ===
- Alice Falls – A waterfall in the Ausable River, northeast of Keeseville.
- Augur Lake – A lake by the northern town line, southwest of Keeseville.
- Ausable Chasm – A location on the Ausable River, northeast of Keeseville.
- Butternut Pond – A lake near the southern town line.
- Corlear Bay – A bay of Lake Champlain in the northeastern part of Chesterfield.
- Mud Brook – A tributary of the Ausable River, entering the river by Ausable Chasm.
- Schuyler Island – An island in Lake Champlain off Trembleau Point.
- Trembleau Point – A short peninsula in Lake Champlain in the northeast of Chesterfield.
- Wickham Marsh Wildlife Management Area – A conservation area north of Port Kent.
- Willsboro Bay – The northern part of the bay is in the southeast of Chersterfield.
