= List of bridges and tunnels on the National Register of Historic Places in New York =

This is a list of bridges and tunnels on the National Register of Historic Places in the U.S. state of New York.

Name	Image	Built	Listed	Location	County	Type
69th Street Transfer Bridge		1911	2003-06-26	New York; 40°46′44″N 73°59′26″W	New York	
Allan Teator Road Stone Arch Bridge		1892	2008-01-09	West Durham; 42°24′27″N 74°13′12″W	Greene	Stone arch bridge
Andrews Street Bridge		1893	1984-10-11	Rochester; 43°9′32″N 77°36′45″W	Monroe	
Ashokan-Turnwood Covered Bridge		1885, 1939	2000-07-20	Olivebridge; 41°55′36″N 74°11′58″W	Ulster	covered bridge
Atlantic Avenue Tunnel	Atlantic Avenue Tunnel	1844	1989-09-07	New York City; 40°41′30″N 74°0′0″W	Kings	Cut and cover tunnel
Avon Five Arch Bridge	Avon Five Arch Bridge	1857	2012-1-4	Avon; 42°54′52″N 77°37′0″W	Livingston	
AuSable Chasm Bridge	AuSable Chasm Bridge	1933, 1934	1999-11-12	AuSable, Chesterfield; 44°31′29″N 73°27′48″W	Clinton, Essex	Steel Arch
Bear Mountain Bridge and Toll House		1923, 1924	1982-11-23	Peekskill, Stony Point; 41°19′12″N 73°58′49″W	Rockland, Westchester	
Beaverkill Covered Bridge	Beaverkill Covered Bridge	1865	2007-10-03	Beaverkill; 41°58′53″N 74°50′12″W	Sullivan	
Bedford Creek Bridge		ca. 1825	1989-10-18	Hounsfield; 43°54′32″N 76°7′12″W	Jefferson	Stone arch bridge
Beer's Bridge	Beer's Bridge	ca. 1900, ca. 1925	1999-11-12	Keene Valley; 44°10′11″N 73°46′57″W	Essex	Pratt Pony Truss
Brand Hollow Road Stone Arch Bridge		1892, 1893	2008-04-10	West Durham	Greene	Stone arch bridge
Bridge L-158		1883, 1904	1978-11-29	Goldens Bridge; 41°17′47″N 73°40′59″W	Westchester	Whipple through truss
Brooklyn Bridge		1869, 1883	1966-10-15	New York	Kings, New York	Wire cable suspension bridge
Buskirk Covered Bridge		ca. 1850	1978-03-08	Buskirk; 42°57′30″N 73°26′0″W	Rensselaer, Washington	Covered Howe truss
Caneadea Bridge	Caneada Bridge	1903	1998-11-19	Caneadea; 42°23′6″N 78°8′59″W	Allegany	Camel Parker Truss
Carpenter's Flats Bridge	Carpenter's Flats Bridge	1941	1999-11-12	AuSable, Peru; 44°33′32″N 73°26′57″W	Clinton	Warren Steel Truss
Copeland Covered Bridge	Copeland Covered Bridge	1879	1998-08-06	Edinburg; 43°13′15″N 74°6′2″W	Saratoga	
Court Street Bridge		1893	1984-10-11	Rochester; 43°9′12″N 77°36′34″W	Monroe	
Delaware and Hudson Railroad Bridge		1913	1999-11-12	AuSable, Peru; 44°33′20″N 73°26′5″W	Clinton	Warren Steel Truss Bridge
Double-Span Metal Pratt Truss Bridge	Double-Span Metal Pratt Truss Bridge	1877	1983-05-20	Keeseville; 44°30′4″N 73°29′9″W	Clinton, Essex	Truss Bridge
Double-Span Whipple Bowstring Truss Bridge		1870	1980-04-17	Claverack; 42°12′54″N 73°43′45″W	Columbia	Whipple bowstring truss
Downsville Covered Bridge	Downsville Covered Bridge	1854	1999-04-29	Downsville; 42°4′34″N 74°59′28″W	Delaware	
Eagleville Covered Bridge	Eagleville Covered Bridge	1858	1978-03-08	Eagleville; 43°5′0″N 73°18′51″W	Washington	Covered Town lattice plank truss
Elm Street Stone Arch Bridge		ca. 1900	1996-12-16	Pine Hill; 42°8′0″N 74°28′48″W	Ulster	
Fitches Covered Bridge	Fitches Covered Bridge	1870, 1885	1999-04-29	East Delhi; 42°17′53″N 74°52′47″W	Delaware	
Frazier Bridge		1894, 1925	1998-12-17	Ticonderoga; 43°51′1″N 73°25′21″W	Essex	Double arched bridge
Grant Mills Covered Bridge		1902	1998-12-17	Hardenbergh; 42°4′48″N 74°37′45″W	Ulster	
Hadley Parabolic Bridge		1895	1977-03-25	Hadley; 43°18′50″N 73°50′44″W	Saratoga	Semi-deck Lenticular Truss
Hamden Covered Bridge	Hamden Covered Bridge	1859	1999-04-29	Hamden; 42°11′44″N 74°59′19″W	Delaware	
Hankins Stone Arch Bridge		1905	2000-07-27	Hankins; 41°48′59″N 75°5′31″W	Sullivan	Stone arch bridge
Hervey Street Road Stone Arch Bridge		1891	2008-01-09	Hervey Street; 42°20′42″N 74°7′37″W	Greene	Stone arch bridge
High Bridge Aqueduct and Water Tower		1838, 1844, 1872	1972-12-04	New York	New York, Bronx	
Holland Tunnel		1920, 1927	1993-11-04	New York	New York	Cast iron subaqueous tunnel
Hyde Hall Covered Bridge	Hyde Hall Covered Bridge	1825	1998-12-17	East Springfield; 42°47′25″N 74°51′50″W	Otsego	
IRT Broadway Line Viaduct		1900, 1904	1983-09-15	New York; 40°49′12″N 73°57′20″W	New York	
Jones Beach State Park, Causeway and Parkway System	Wantagh Parkway Approach		2005-04-28	Wantagh	Nassau	
Joralemon Street Tunnel	Joralemon Street Tunnel	1908	2006-02-09	New York; 40°41′53″N 74°0′27″W	New York	
Kingston-Port Ewen Suspension Bridge		1919, 1921, 1922	1980-04-30	Kingston; 41°54′53″N 73°59′0″W	Ulster	
Lalino Stone Arch Bridge		by 1870	2001-12-28	Middleville; 43°8′14″N 74°56′42″W	Herkimer	
Lower Shavertown Covered Bridge		1877	1999-04-29	Methol; 41°55′24″N 75°0′49″W	Delaware	
Lower Dock Hill Road Stone Arch Bridge		ca. 1850	2010-04-28	Cornwall-on-Hudson	Orange	Stone arch bridge
Main Street Bridge	Main Street Bridge	1857	1984-10-11	Rochester; 43°9′22″N 77°36′39″W	Monroe	
Manhattan Bridge		1901, 1909	1983-08-30	New York	Kings, New York	Suspension
Mill Street Stone Arch Bridge		ca. 1897	1996-12-16	Pine Hill; 42°8′1″N 74°29′0″W	Ulster	
Millanville-Skinners Falls Bridge	Mallanville-Skinners Falls Bridge	1904	1988-11-14	Skinners Falls; 41°40′10″N 75°3′31″W	Sullivan	Baltimore truss
Moore Road Stone Arch Bridge		1887	2008-04-10	Cornwallville	Greene	
New York, Westchester & Boston Railway Highbrook Avenue Bridge		1911	2016-08-02	Pelham; 40°54′49.9″N 73°48′16.6″W	Westchester	Concrete arch
Newfield Covered Bridge	Newfield Covered Bridge	1853	2000-02-25	Newfield; 42°21′47″N 76°35′27″W	Tompkins	
Newport Stone Arch Bridge	Newport Stone Arch Bridge	1853	1992-02-10	Newport; 43°11′6″N 75°1′4″W	Herkimer	Stone arch bridge
Notman Bridge	Notman Bridge	1913	1999-11-12	Keene Valley; 44°11′29″N 73°47′5″W	Essex	stone-faced, concrete arch
Old Blenheim Bridge		1834	1966-10-15	North Blenheim; 42°28′21″N 74°26′29″W	Schoharie	Single span double-tunnel
Old City Road Stone Arch Bridge		1898	2001-12-28	Welch Corners; 43°9′51″N 74°59′8″W	Herkimer	
Old State Road Bridge		ca. 1890, 1932	1999-11-12	AuSable Chasm; 44°31′25″N 73°27′37″W	Clinton	Pratt Pony Truss Bridge
Oliver Avenue Bridge		1895	1984-07-19	Middletown; 41°27′14″N 74°26′0″W	Orange	Pratt Truss
Ouaquaga Lenticular Truss Bridge		1888	2003-02-20	Ouaquaga; 42°7′24″N 75°38′52″W	Broome	Lenticular Truss Bridge
Palmer Brook Bridge		1938	1999-11-12	AuSable Forks; 44°26′37″N 73°40′29″W	Clinton	stone-faced concrete arch
Perrine's Bridge		1844	1973-04-13	Rosendale	Ulster	Burr Arch
Pilgrim's Progress Road Bridge	Pilgrims Progress Road Bridge	ca. 1858	1987-07-09	Rhinebeck; 41°56′22″N 73°52′50″W	Dutchess	
Pond Eddy Bridge	Pond Eddy Bridge	1904	1988-11-14	Pond Eddy; 41°26′21″N 74°49′13″W	Sullivan	Pennsylvania truss
Port Morris Ferry Bridges		1948	2014-02-05	New York City; 40°47′58.0″N 73°54′29.0″W	Bronx	
Poughkeepsie Railroad Bridge		1876, 1888	1979-02-23	Poughkeepsie; 41°42′39″N 73°55′47″W	Dutchess	Warren Deck-Truss
Queensboro Bridge		1909	1978-12-20	New York	New York, Queens	Through cantilever truss
Ranney Bridge	Ranney Bridge	1902, ca. 1925	1999-11-12	Keene Valley; 44°10′55″N 73°47′3″W	Essex	Pratt Pony Truss Bridge
Raymondville Parabolic Bridge		1886	1984-09-07	Raymondville; 44°50′23″N 74°58′47″W	St. Lawrence	Lenticular Truss
Rexleigh Covered Bridge	Rexleigh Covered Bridge	1874	1978-03-08	Jackson; 42°14′3″N 73°22′47″W	Washington	Covered Howe truss
Rockland Road Bridge		1874	2005-12-07	Village of Piermont; 41°2′6″N 73°55′10″W	Rockland	
Rorig Bridge		1890	1983-09-26	Westfield; 42°18′58″N 79°34′44″W	Chautauqua	Pratt Through Truss
Route 29 Stone Arch Bridge		by 1870	2001-01-26	Middleville; 43°8′15″N 74°56′59″W	Herkimer	
Ruhle Road Lenticular Metal Truss Bridge	Ruhle Road Lenticular Metal Truss Bridge	1888	2004-09-04	Malta	Saratoga	
Salisbury Center Covered Bridge	Salisbury Covered Bridge	1875	1972-06-19	Salisbury Center; 43°8′27″N 74°47′17″W	Herkimer	Burr Arch Truss
Salisbury Turnpike Bridge	Salisbury Turnpike Bridge	ca. 1858	1987-07-09	Rhinebeck; 41°56′20″N 73°52′46″W	Dutchess	
Shady Glen Road Stone Arch Bridge		1886	2008-01-09	Cornwallville; 42°22′47″N 74°8′44″W	Greene	
Shushan Covered Bridge	Shushan Covered Bridge	1858	1978-03-08	Shushan; 43°5′28″N 73°20′45″W	Washington	Covered Town lattice plank truss
Silk Street Bridge		ca. 1888	1998-04-30	Newark Valley; 42°13′3″N 76°11′38″W	Tioga	lenticular pony truss
Slater Bridge		ca. 1900, ca. 1932	1999-11-12	Keene Valley; 44°9′31″N 73°46′40″W	Essex	Warren pony truss
Smith-Ransome Japanese Bridge		ca. 1900	2018-02-02	Shelter Island; 41°03′02.7″N 72°19′09.5″W	Suffolk	Concrete arch
South Washington Street Parabolic Bridge	South Washington Street Parabolic Bridge	1886, 1887	1978-01-30	Binghamton; 42°5′33″N 75°54′54″W	Broome	Lenticular truss
Sparkill Creek Drawbridge	Sparkill Creek Drawbridge	1880	1985-03-28	Piermont; 41°2′14″N 73°54′58″W	Rockland	Pratt Pony Truss
Spengler Bridge		1880	1973-02-23	Chatham; 42°25′51″N 73°35′59″W	Columbia	Pratt truss
Stillwater Bridge	Stillwater Bridge	1913	1997-11-07	Stillwater; 43°32′41″N 75°55′20″W	Oswego	Pratt through Truss
Stone Arch Bridge	Stone Arch Bridge	1843	1999-11-12	Keeseville; 44°30′19″N 73°28′52″W	Clinton, Essex	Stone Arch
Stone Arch Bridge	Stone Arch Bridge - Kenoza Lake	ca. 1873	1976-12-12	Kenoza Lake; 41°44′53″N 74°57′15″W	Sullivan	
Swing Bridge	Swing Bridge	1888	1999-11-12	Keeseville; 44°30′13″N 73°28′58″W	Clinton, Essex	Pedestrian Suspension Bridge
Tioronda Bridge		1869, 1873	1976-10-08	Beacon; 41°29′19″N 73°58′28″W	Dutchess	Bowstring Iron-Truss
Town Line Bridge		1888	2008-5-29	Taylor	Cortland	
Tusten Stone Arch Bridge		1896	2000-07-27	Tusten; 41°33′22″N 75°1′10″W	Sullivan	stone arch bridge
Walton Bridge	Walton Bridge	1840, 1925	1999-11-12	Keene; 44°14′41″N 73°47′53″W	Essex	Lenticular Through Truss
Washington Bridge		1886, 1889	1983-09-22	New York; 40°50′53″N 73°55′52″W	Bronx, New York	
Water, Wall, and Pine Streets Lenticular Truss Bridges		1881	1977-10-05	Homer	Cortland	Lenticular truss
Whipple Cast and Wrought Iron Bowstring Truss Bridge	Whipple Cast and Wrought Iron Bowstring Truss Bridge	1867	1971-03-18	Albany; 42°38′8″N 73°48′4″W	Albany	Whipple Iron Bowstring Truss
Wilmington Bridge		1934, 1935	1999-11-12	Wilmington; 44°23′20″N 73°49′4″W	Essex	Stone faced concrete arch
Wood Road Metal Truss Bridge		1897	2005-03-15	Campbell; 42°15′9″N 77°13′2″W	Steuben	
Woodward Road Stone Arch Bridge		1887	2009-3-9	East Durham; 42°22′16″N 74°5′46″W	Greene	Stone arch bridge
Park Avenue Viaduct part of Grand Central Terminal			1983-08-11	New York; 40°44′59″N 73°58′40″W	New York	
Ruhle Road Stone Arch Bridge	Ruhle Road Stone Bridge	ca. 1873	removed 2004-09-04	Malta	Saratoga	Spandrel arch
Wanakena Footbridge	Wanakena Footbridge	1902, 1912	removed 2016-05-03	Fine; 44°7′59″N 74°55′18″W	St. Lawrence	Suspension bridge
