= Whipple Cast and Wrought Iron Bowstring Truss Bridge =

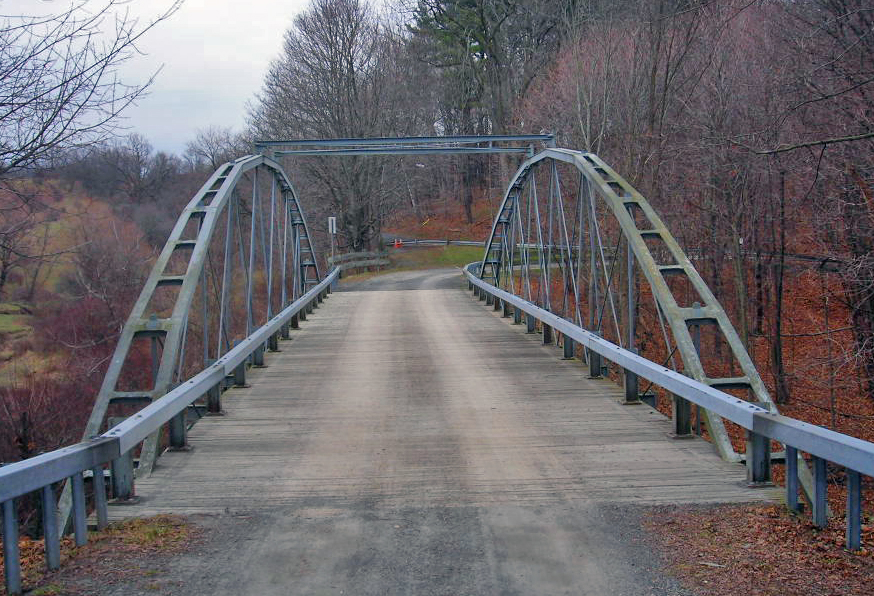
- Normanskill Farm Bridge seen from west, 2006
- Coordinates: 42°38′09″N 73°48′02″W
- Carries: Mill Road
- Crosses: Unnamed tributary of Normans Kill
- Locale: Albany, NY, U.S.
- Other name: Normanskill Farm Bridge
- Owner: City of Albany
- Heritage status: NRHP #71000523

Characteristics
- Design: Whipple bowstring truss bridge
- Material: Iron
- Total length: 109.9 feet (33.5 m)
- Width: 22.75 feet (6.93 m)

History
- Designer: Squire Whipple
- Constructed by: Simon De Graff
- Opened: 1867

Location
- Interactive map of Whipple Cast and Wrought Iron; Bowstring Truss Bridge

The Whipple Cast and Wrought Iron Bowstring Truss Bridge over Normans Kill in Albany, New York, United States, is one of the bowstring truss bridges introduced by Squire Whipple in 1841 and used widely to span the Erie Canal. An economic and innovative design patented by him, its light and inexpensive construction uses cast iron in compression in the bridge's arch and wrought iron in tension to offset the horizontal forces created by the arch. Such a design is similar to a tied arch bridge, but incorporates diagonals in tension similar to the Whipple truss and Pratt truss designs.

Three known examples of the type exist, all in New York State: the Normanskill Farm Bridge, the Shaw Bridge, and a footbridge on the campus of Union College, Whipple's alma mater.

== Examples ==
=== Normanskill Farm Bridge ===
A prominent surviving example of the type (known locally as the Normanskill Farm Bridge) is located in southwestern Albany, New York, United States. Built in 1867, it was moved to its present location near the entrance to Stevens Farm in 1899. The span is one of the oldest surviving iron bridges in the county, one of the few that use both cast and wrought iron. It was listed on the National Register of Historic Places in 1971, the only bridge in the city of Albany so far to be listed individually.

The patent on Squire Whipple's original bowstring truss design had expired by the time it was built by a Syracuse-based contractor. Its original location is unknown, but is believed to have been somewhere west of the city, possibly in Schoharie County.

When the old Albany and Delaware Turnpike, today Delaware Avenue, was rerouted in 1899 to what is now Normanskill Drive, it was moved to its present location to make the farm more accessible from the main road. When Delaware was straightened out into what is today New York State Route 443 (NY 443), traffic on the bridge went down, allowing the bridge to remain in use, although only for cars. Today it is limited only to pedestrian use, and is closed in winter. The City of Albany approved a small-scale restoration project in 2012.

==== Site ====
The bridge carries Mill Road across a deep ravine about 100 feet (30 m) west of Normanskill Drive. The surrounding area is wooded; to the west of the ravine the woods give way almost immediately to the Stevens Farm complex. The ravine is dry most of the time, but after heavy rains it carries water from a small basin extending northeast a quarter-mile (400 m) as far as the New York State Thruway (Interstate 87) to the Normans Kill 200 feet (61 m) to the south, which at this point is the boundary between the city of Albany and the town of Bethlehem to the south. To the east the land rises steeply. The wooded, park-like area gives way to a more developed residential neighborhood along the north side of today's Delaware Avenue (NY 443), opposite a large cemetery. The approach road is a narrow gravel strip.

==== Structure ====
The bridge itself is a 109.9 feet (33.5 m) long and 22.75 feet (6.93 m) wide, supported by abutments on either side of concrete on the upper level and stone laid in a random ashlar pattern below. Its main components are the two top and two bottom chords.

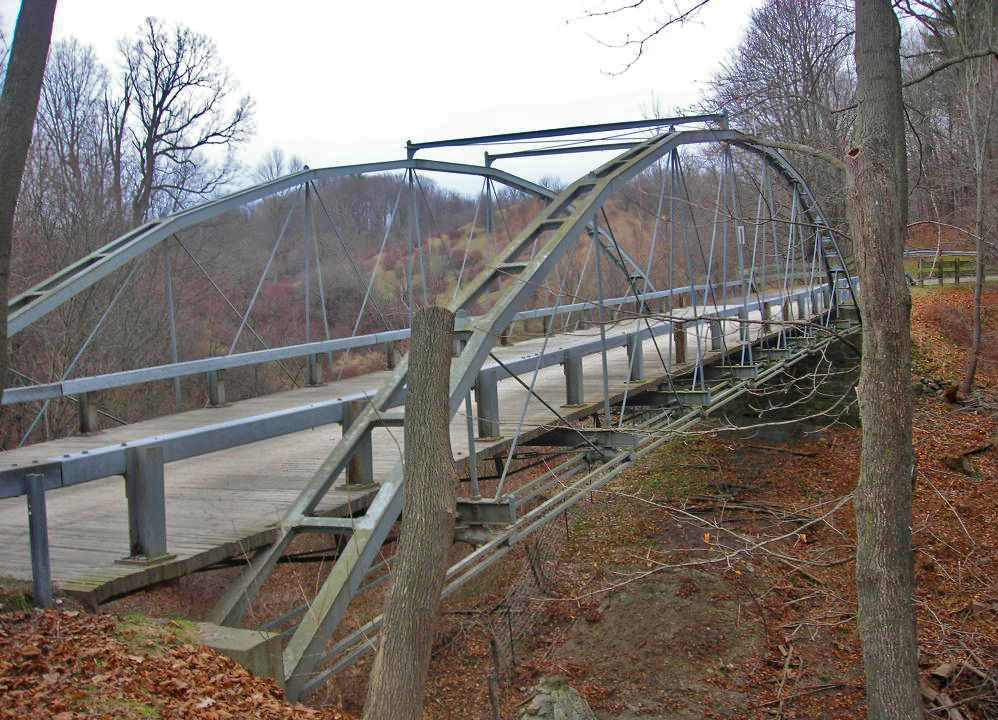
View of bridge from side

On top, the chords form an arch of nine tangential castings of an inverted-U cast-iron bars which compress in response to a load. They are matched by bottom chords of two lines of nine wrought-iron open links, made from one-and-a-half-inch (38 mm) square bars, which restrain the compression. They are connected by eight vertical rods on each side, with tie rods additionally bracing the two in the middle that rise the highest.

The four central vertical members on each side are inverted V's of two 5/8-inch (15.9 mm) bars welded together at the top and inserted into the floor beams via threaded bottom ends. At the ends the verticals are four 2-inch (51 mm) rods. Rods 7/8 of an inch wide (21.2 mm) form the diagonals, double in each panel, bracing the bridge against wind.

Latitudinal and longitudinal I-beams supported by the bottom chords provide a deck frame. They are trussed with two 7/8-inch wrought iron rods and braced by tie rods. Wooden planks laid horizontally across the frame serve as the deck. Modern box girder guardrails run along both sides.

==== History ====
Albany resident Squire Whipple (1804-1888) is considered the first bridge builder in the United States to apply scientific principles to the field, moving it from what had that point been primarily a tradesman's domain toward that of the civil engineer. His self-published 1847 book A Work on Bridge Building is considered the first to have properly analyzed the stresses on bridge trusses, and developed mathematical procedures to account for them that are still useful. It was not fully appreciated until the last years of his life, in the 1880s.

Seven years before writing his book, he had realized that the growth along the Erie Canal would require the construction of hundreds of bridges. His iron bowstring truss was a solution to how that could be accomplished quickly and cheaply. With a thousand dollars he had saved, he built the first one across the canal at Utica in 1841.

It was successful, and proved highly popular. So popular, that despite Whipple's patent on the design, it was widely imitated, keeping Whipple in court in a vain effort to secure royalties from several alleged infringers. He sometimes prevailed, but more often slight refinements or variations on the design were enough for a ruling in their favor. Other builders may simply not have been aware the bowstring truss was protected intellectual property. The state of New York chose the design as its standard for the canal—then avoided royalties, under the law of that time, by declaring the bridges were being built "for the public good." Within years Whipple's design was widely used all over the Northeast. Despite that popularity, only one other one remained in use for vehicular traffic as of 1968, over Cayadutta Creek near Fonda, New York, in the Mohawk Valley.

Whipple had renewed the patent on its original expiration in 1855, but by the time of its 1869 expiration had given up trying to enforce it. It was two years before the end of that period that the bridge currently in Albany was built by Simon De Graff of Syracuse. Where, exactly, it was built is not known. When bought for the current location it was described as having been in "Schoharie". That could mean the village of Schoharie, Schoharie County (of which the village is seat) or the Schoharie Creek valley, which is mostly identical with the county—all of which are roughly 25 miles (40 km) west of Albany. De Graff's location, and the bridge's popularity along the canal, could also argue for a location even further west.

One of the advantages of Whipple's bowstring truss that builders like De Graff were quick to see, and improve, was its ease of assembly and portability. A complete span could shipped to its desired location in small pieces and put together quickly, without too many specialized tools, anchored by abutments built at necessary on site. If it needed to be moved, it could be disassembled with relative ease and reassembled at the new location.

It was this feature that made the bridge an attractive purchase to the owners of the Normanskill Farm 32 years later. The Albany and Delaware Turnpike, main road from the city to its southwest, was being rerouted north from Normansville in 1899 to the alignment that Normanskill Drive presently follows around the hillside, becoming Old Delaware Avenue once it crosses the Normans Kill into Bethlehem. The new routing made it a natural choice to build an access road from the farm to the turnpike, to replace the steep climb the original access road (Mill Road's continuation) had had. The bridge was purchased to cross the ravine for that purpose, and installed on newly constructed stone and mortar abutments in 1900.

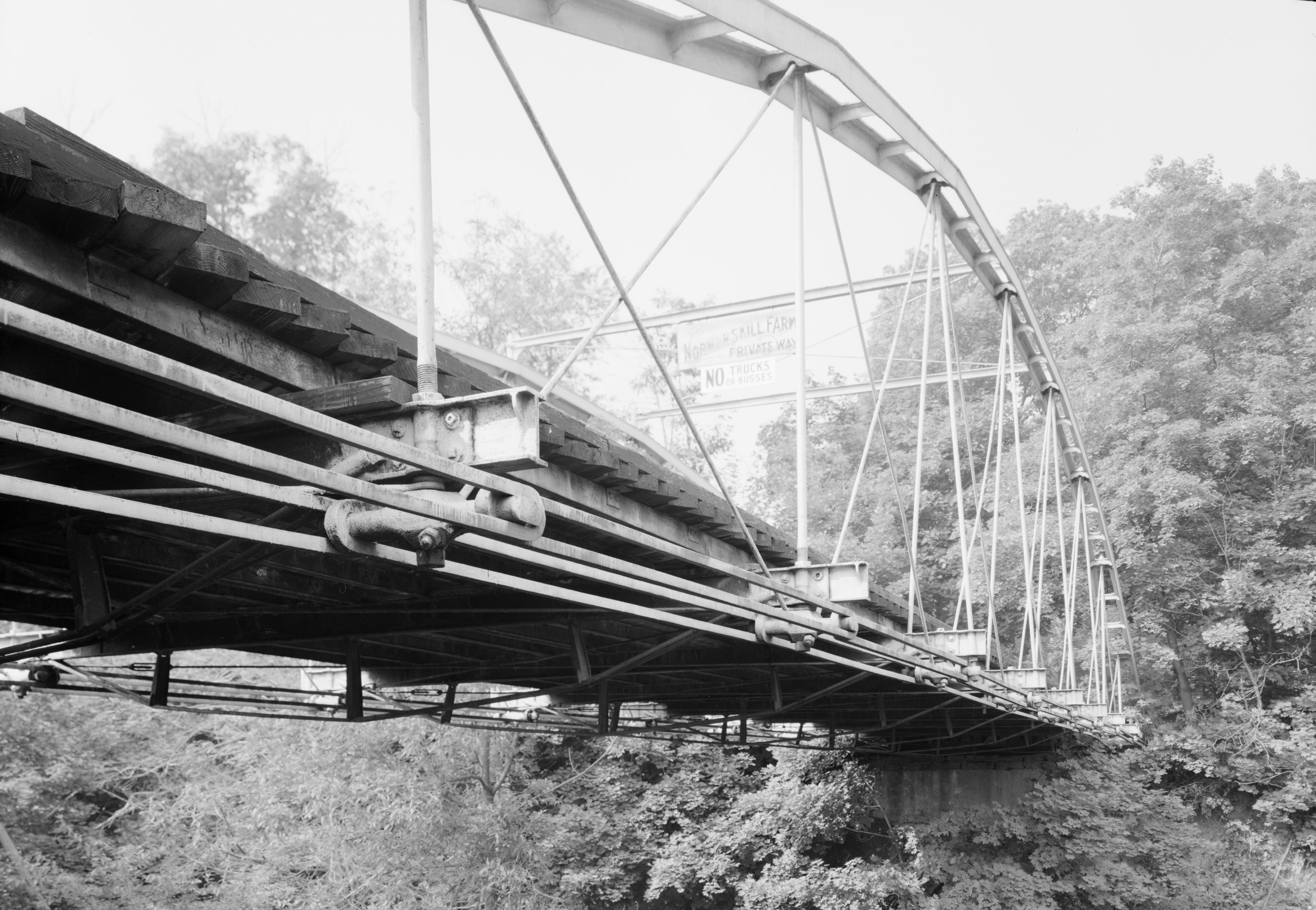
HAER picture of bridge, ca. 1969

By the middle of the 20th century, the turnpike had been rerouted again. Newer technology had made it possible for the road, now part of New York State Route 443, to follow the current straight route across the ravine, on a viaduct over the bridge built a half-century earlier, which remained in place. What had been the main road to the farm was now just another quiet detour.

At the time the bridge was surveyed by the Historic American Engineering Record (HAER), around 1969, only cars were allowed over it due to its age. Eventually the city of Albany bought the farm, using it as a park, a training facility and stables for police horses and an environmental education center. Early in the 21st century it had to close the bridge to vehicles and to all traffic during the winter months when some small cracks were detected during an inspection. In 2012 the city council authorized $150,000 to repair them.

In 2025, all bicycle and pedestrian use of the bridge was stopped, with signage giving no indication as to why or by whom. Public access remains to both ends of the bridge, but not over the bridge itself.

=== Shaw Bridge ===
The Shaw Bridge is a historic double-span whipple bowstring truss bridge located in Claverack, New York. It is composed of two identical 162 feet (49 m) spans tied together over a central masonry pier. It was in a deteriorated condition as of 2011, with a fate presently unknown.

=== Union College footbridge ===
The city of Johnstown, New York, donated a Whipple bowstring arch bridge to Union College in Schenectady, New York, in 1979, which was relocated to the campus and spans the Hans Groot Kill as a footbridge there. Originally built in 1859 to bridge the Cayadutta Creek in Johnstown, it is one of five truss bridges built by Whipple in eastern New York, and possibly the oldest among them. This bridge was designated a National Historic Civil Engineering Landmark in 1981.

== See also ==
- List of bridges and tunnels on the National Register of Historic Places in New York
- List of bridges documented by the Historic American Engineering Record in New York (state)
- National Register of Historic Places listings in Albany, New York
