= Jeremiah Cunningham =

Jeremiah Cunningham (September 1839 – May 23, 1908) was a farmer, mechanic, builder, and highway commissioner in Durham, New York. He served as highway commissioner from 1886 to at least 1900, and several of his stone arch bridges are listed on the United States National Register of Historic Places.

== Biography ==
Cunningham was born in 1839 on his father's farm in the northeastern part of Durham, New York along what is now known as Cunningham Road. He worked as a farmer and mechanic for many years. According to an 1896 Greene County Directory, Cunningham had a 160-acre farm. In March 1886, he became the Commissioner of Highways in Durham. He held that position until at least 1900. During his tenure, Cunningham kept journals and account books detailing his work as highway commissioner. He built 13 bridges as highway commissioner, and eight of his stone arch bridges survive. Six of Cunningham's bridges have been listed on the U.S. National Register of Historic Places. His bridges were typically constructed using local limestone and a dry-laid fieldstone method with a round arch. The Shady Glen Road Stone Arch Bridge was built in the spring of 1886 and was one of the first to be built by Cunningham after his appointment as bridge commissioner. Early entries from his journals as highway commissioner include the following:

- March 9, 1886: "I begin town business we appoint overseers of highway."
- March 12, 1886: "I go to Durham and finish up qualifying for commissioner then I make a fool of myself and go down to Charles Brown and work at the bridge."
- March 18, 1886: "for the first I begin to examine the bridges of Cornwallville."
- March 19, 1886: "I examine bridges today East Durham and Wright street."
- April 5, 1886: "I go to Elliotts early we take down the bridge and a temporary one. we work until dark then I boil sap."

Cunningham died in 1909 on the family farm where he was born.

== List of works ==
Cunningham's surviving stone arch bridges include:

- Allan Teator Road Stone Arch Bridge (1892), Allan Teator Road, West Durham, New York, NRHP-listed
- Brand Hollow Road Stone Arch Bridge (1892–1893), Brand Hollow Road, West Durham, New York, NRHP-listed
- Hervey Street Road Stone Arch Bridge (1891), Hervey Street Road, & Hervey Street-Sunside Road, in Greene County, New York, NRHP-listed
- Moore Road Stone Arch Bridge (c. 1887), Moore Road, Cornwallville, New York, NRHP-listed
- Shady Glen Road Stone Arch Bridge (1886), Shady Glen Road at Stone Bridge Road, Cornwallville, New York, NRHP-listed
- Woodward Road Stone Arch Bridge (c. 1887), Woodward Road, East Durham, New York, NRHP-listed
