= Jacob P. Mesick House =

Historic house in New York, United States

- U.S. National Register of Historic Places
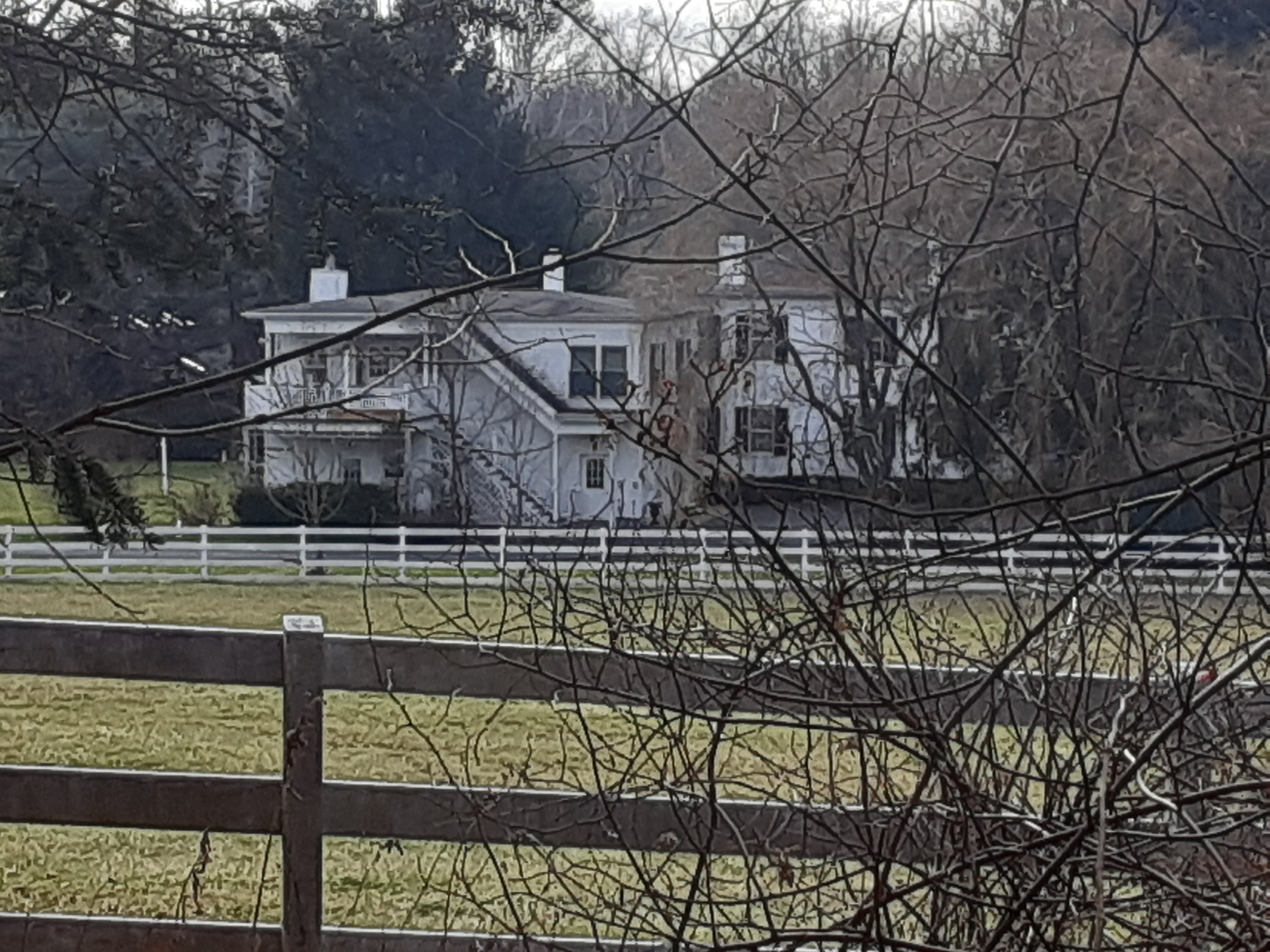

- Location within New York Location within the United States
- Location: Claverack-Red Mills, New York
- Nearest city: Hudson
- Coordinates: 42°12′56.783″N 73°43′37.355″W
- Area: 79 acres (32 ha)
- Built: ca. 1840
- Architectural style: Greek Revival
- MPS: The Architectural and Historic Resources of the Hamlet of Claverack, Columbia County, New York
- NRHP reference No.: 97000947
- Added to NRHP: 1997

The Jacob P. Mesick House is located on Van Wyck Lane in Claverack-Red Mills, New York, United States. It is a wooden house in the Greek Revival architectural style built in the mid-19th century.

It is a strong example of that style in the region that has remained intact since its construction, with its original front facade restored in the early 20th century. Jacob Mesick, its builder and first resident, was a prosperous local farmer who later went into politics. The house has remained in family hands. In 1997 it was listed on the National Register of Historic Places.

== Building ==
The Mesick House is on a rise above Van Wyck Lane, at the west end of a 79-acre (32 ha) parcel with several other buildings on it, none of them contributing to its historic character. Shaw Bridge (now closed), also listed on the Register, is to the south along the street, crossing Claverack Creek a short distance east of NY 23/9H, the main north–south through route through Claverack. The land crosses the creek to an area of cultivated fields in the east.

The house itself is a two-story, five-by-five-bay clapboard-sided frame structure on a stone foundation topped with a hipped roof pierced by four brick chimneys.

The Colonial Revival main entrance, a paneled door also with sidelights and transom, opens into a wide center hall with stair. The walls have their original French print wall covering. On either side the large parlors, and the small rooms behind them, retain all their original finishes as well. An archway connects the front and back rooms on the north.

The outbuildings are located near the main house. South of it is a modern garage. To the east are the other two, a pole barn and barn/apartment. All are of modern construction.

== History ==
The land was originally part of the Van Buren family holdings. It later passed to the van Rensselaers, and from them Jacobus Delamater bought it in 1785. He, in turn, sold it to Mesick in 1831.

Mesick built a prosperous farm on the lot, which led to the house's construction around 1840. It is one of the few Greek Revival buildings in Claverack, showing the adaptation of that style into the local architectural tradition. Its level of decoration, symmetry and massing are strong and distinctive aspects of the Greek Revival style.

Later in his career Mesick served in the state assembly. From him it passed to his son, the grandson. It remains in the family.

During the later 19th century, the original colonnade was replaced with a full-length front porch. In the early 20th century, the original entrance was restored in keeping with the Colonial Revival movement of the era. Later, slight modifications include the archway added on the first floor and the removal of the original oven and firebox pump from the kitchen in the mid-century.

== See also ==
- National Register of Historic Places listings in Columbia County, New York
