= Hervey Street Road Stone Arch Bridge =

- U.S. National Register of Historic Places
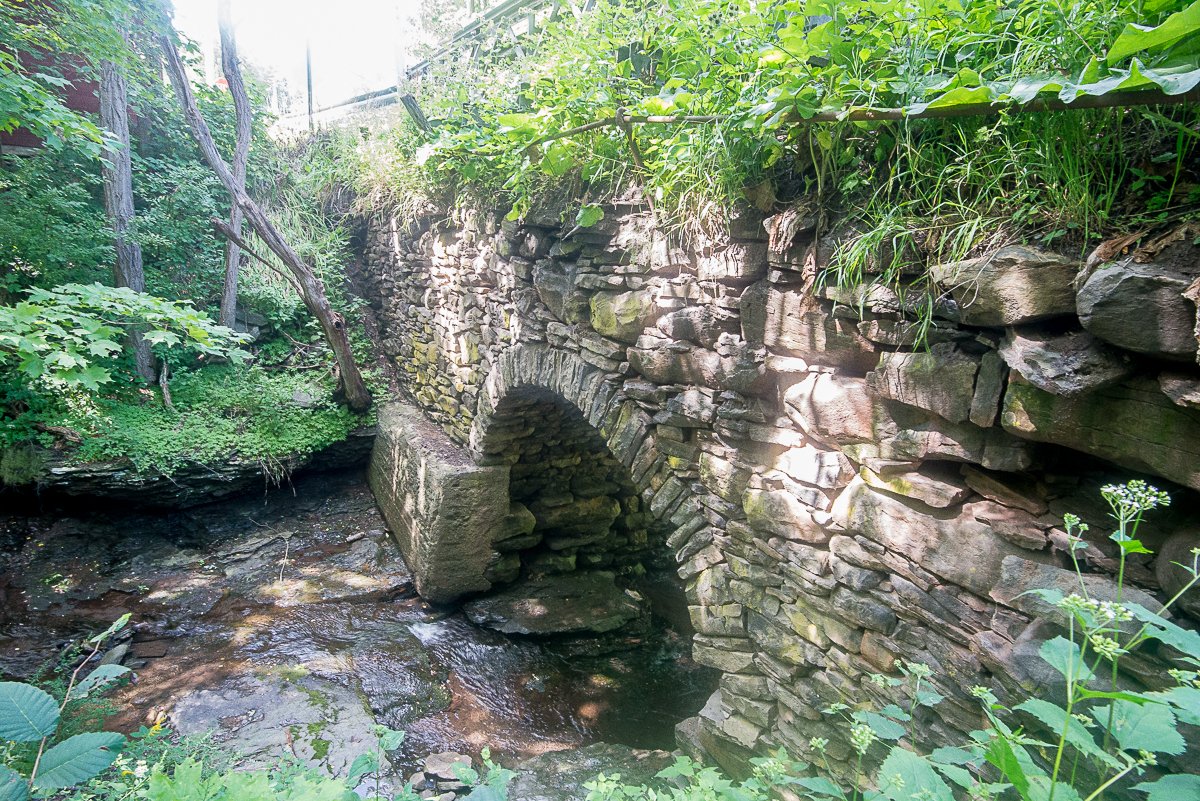
- Bridge in 2016

- Location within New York Location within the United States
- Location: Hervey Street Road, & Hervey Street-Sunside Road, Hervey Street, New York
- Coordinates: 42°20′42″N 74°7′37″W
- Area: less than one acre
- Built: 1891
- Built by: Cunningham, Jeremiah
- NRHP reference No.: 07001367
- Added to NRHP: January 9, 2008

The Hervey Street Road Stone Arch Bridge is a historic stone arch bridge located in Durham, New York, United States. It was constructed in 1891 and is a single span, dry laid limestone bridge with a round arch. It is 11 feet (3.4 m) wide, with a span of 14 feet (4.3 m). It spans a tributary of Thorp Creek.

It was built by Jeremiah Cunningham.

It was listed on the National Register of Historic Places in 2008.

== See also ==
- List of bridges and tunnels on the National Register of Historic Places in New York
- National Register of Historic Places in Greene County, New York
