= Woodward Road Stone Arch Bridge =

- U.S. National Register of Historic Places
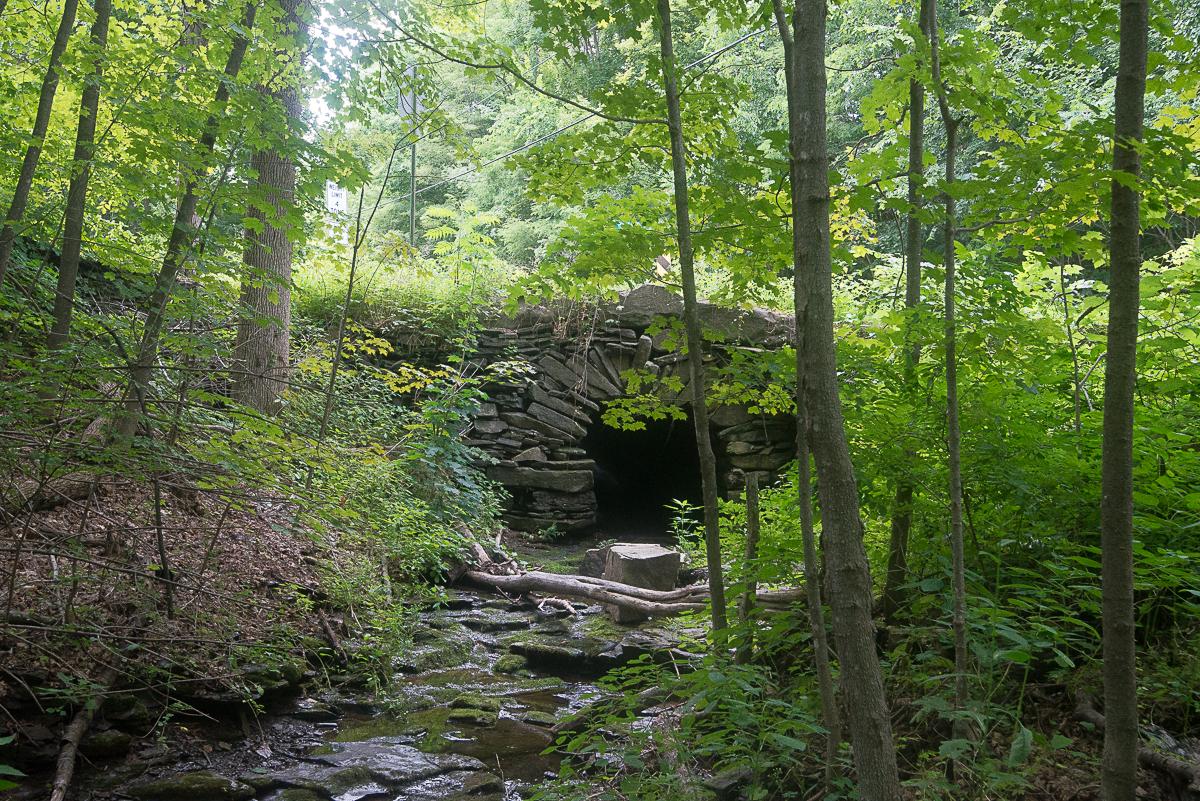
- Bridge in 2016

- Location within New York Location within the United States
- Location: Woodward Road, East Durham, New York
- Coordinates: 42°22′17″N 74°5′46″W
- Area: 0.9 acres (0.36 ha)
- Built: 1887
- Built by: Cunningham, Jeremiah (builder)
- NRHP reference No.: 09000134
- Added to NRHP: March 9, 2009

Woodward Road Stone Arch Bridge is a historic stone arch bridge located at East Durham in Greene County, New York. It was constructed about 1887 and is a single span, dry laid limestone bridge with a round arch. It is eight feet (2.4 m) wide and a span of seven feet (2.1 m). It spans a tributary of Cornwallsville Creek.

It was built by Jeremiah Cunningham.

It was listed on the National Register of Historic Places in 2009.

== See also ==
- List of bridges and tunnels on the National Register of Historic Places in New York
- National Register of Historic Places in Greene County, New York
