= Squire Whipple =

American bridging engineer (1804–1888)

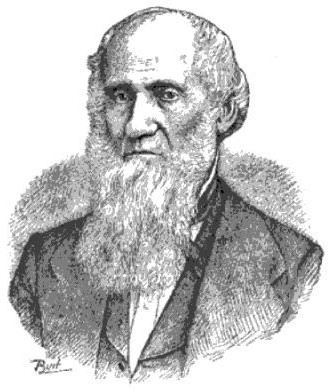
- Born: September 16, 1804; Hardwick, Massachusetts, US
- Died: March 15, 1888 (aged 83); Albany, New York, US
- Burial place: Albany Rural Cemetery
- Occupation: Civil engineer
- Spouse: W. Anna Case
- Parent(s): James Whipple and Electa Johnson

Squire Whipple (September 16, 1804 – March 15, 1888) was an American civil engineer. Educated at Union College, he graduated in one year and went on to become known as the father of iron bridge building in America.

== Biography ==
Squire Whipple was born in Hardwick, Massachusetts, U.S., on September 16, 1804. His family moved to New York when he was thirteen. He received his secondary education at the Fairfield Academy in Herkimer, and graduated from Union College in Schenectady after only one year. He has become known as the father of iron bridge building in America.

He died March 15, 1888, at his home in Albany, New York, and was buried in Albany Rural Cemetery in Menands.

== Bridges ==
Whipple's patented designs were implemented in numerous bridges, both Whipple truss and prefabricated bowstring arch truss bridges, which became the standard design for Erie Canal crossings; using an economical mix of wrought iron for tension members and cast iron in compression. Another such bowstring arch is the Shaw Bridge, the only known Whipple design at its original location and the only known "double" believed extant. Consisting of two identical spans sharing a common pier, it has been described as "a structure of outstanding importance to the history of American engineering and transportation technology."

There are at least four other Whipple bowstrings standing in Central New York state, and one in Newark, Ohio.

The Whipple Cast and Wrought Iron Bowstring Truss Bridge over Norman's Kill in Albany, New York, is a very well preserved example of a Whipple Bowstring Arch Truss. Constructed by S. DeGraff of Syracuse, New York, 1867–69, it is still in daily use, with no posted weight limits. Due to the sleek appearance, many users think it is a modern bridge.

The Delaware Turnpike once ran through both neighborhoods until 1929 with the construction of a new much higher, longer, and wider Delaware Avenue Bridge over the Normans Kill. This allowed commuters to and from Albany to bypass both Normansvilles. The original Whipple Bowstring bridge still stands, though it has been closed to vehicular traffic since January 1990.

Another example stands on the campus of Union College in Schenectady, New York, where it serves as a pedestrian walkway.

=== Gallery ===
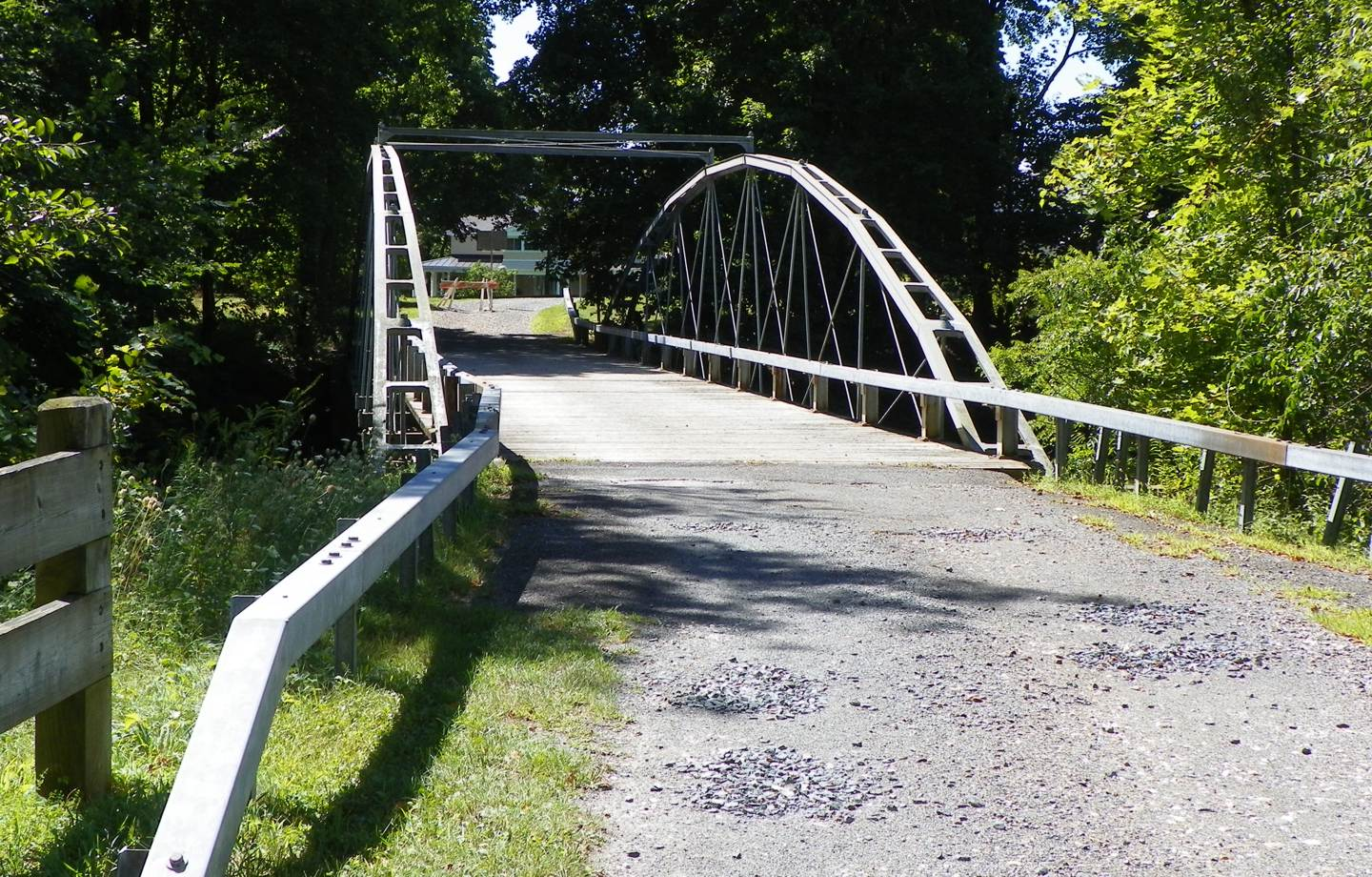
Whipple bowstring arch truss bridge, built in 1867-'69, over Normans Kill in Albany, New York

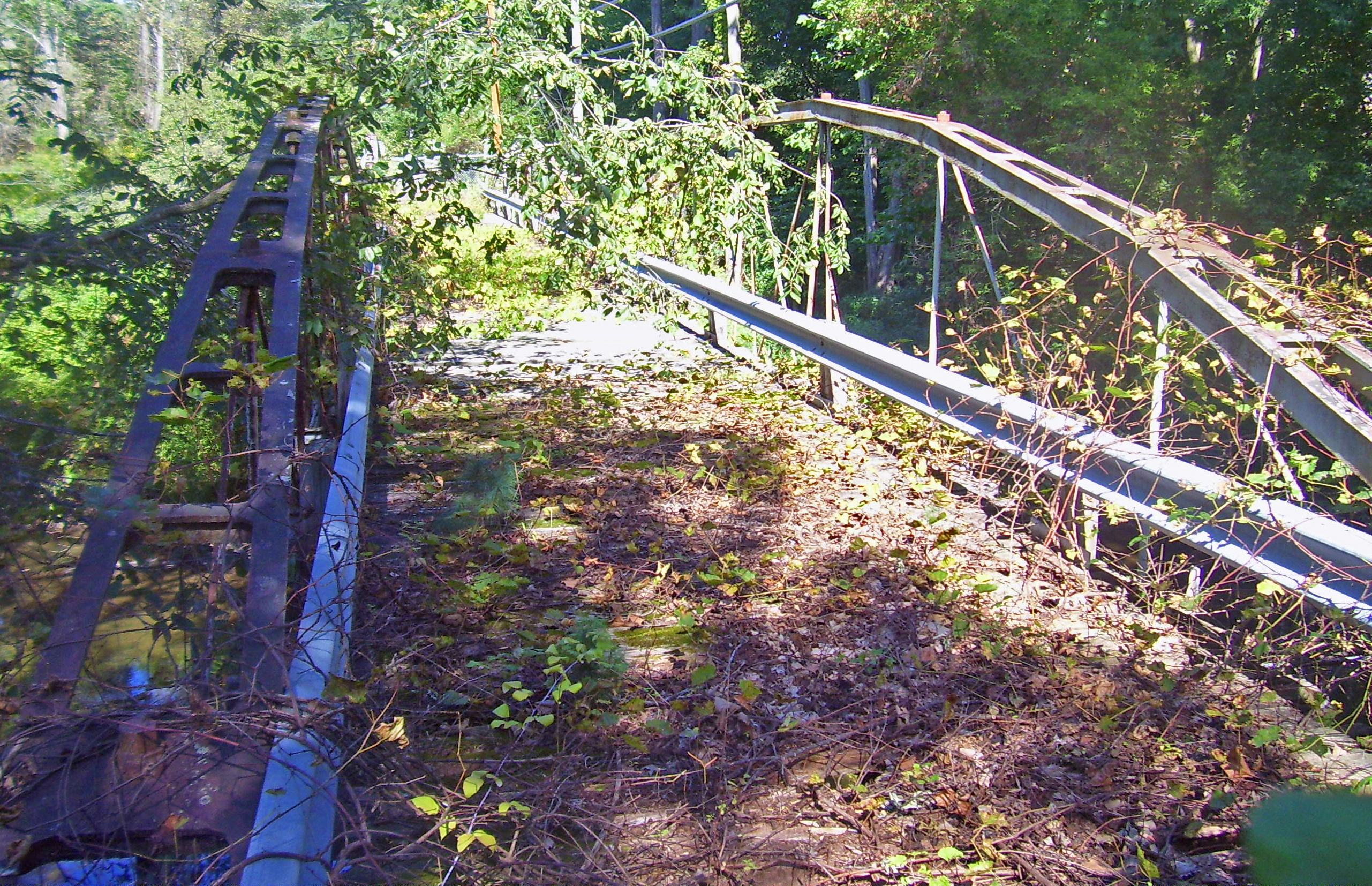
Shaw Bridge, Claverack, New York, the only known double-span Whipple bowstring arch, has two identical spans sharing a common pier

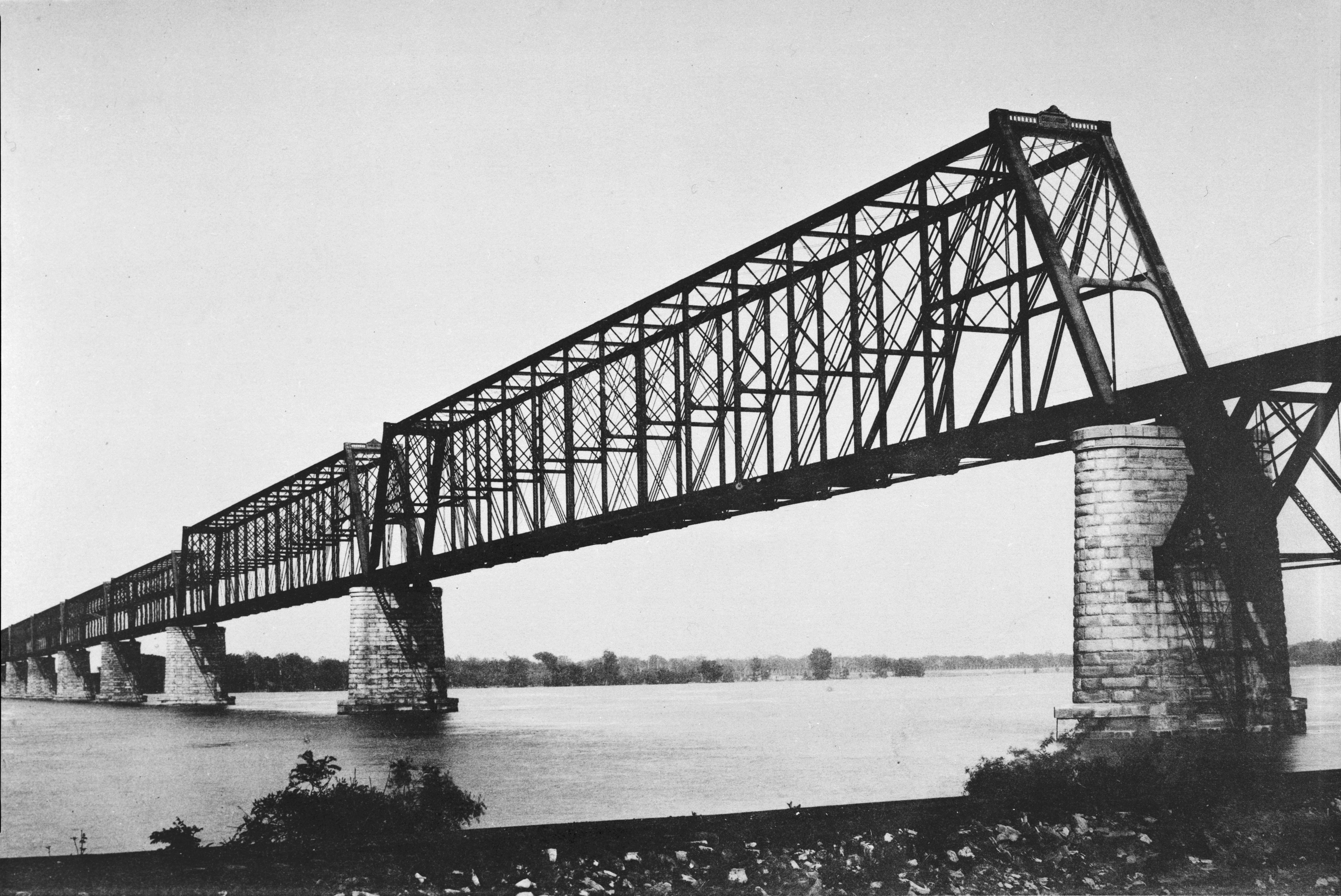
Completed after Whipple's death, the Cairo Rail Bridge near Cairo, Illinois, was built in two 518 ft (157.9 m) Whipple truss spans, each the largest of that design ever constructed.

== Patents ==
- U.S. patent 2,064 – Bowstring iron-bridge truss (1841)
- U.S. patent 134,338 – Lift draw bridge

== Books ==
- A Work on Bridge-Building: Consisting of Two Essays, the One Elementary and General, the Other Giving Original Plans, and Practical Details, for Iron and Wooden Bridges (1847)
- An elementary and practical treatise on bridge building (1899)
