= Allan Teator Road Stone Arch Bridge =

- U.S. National Register of Historic Places
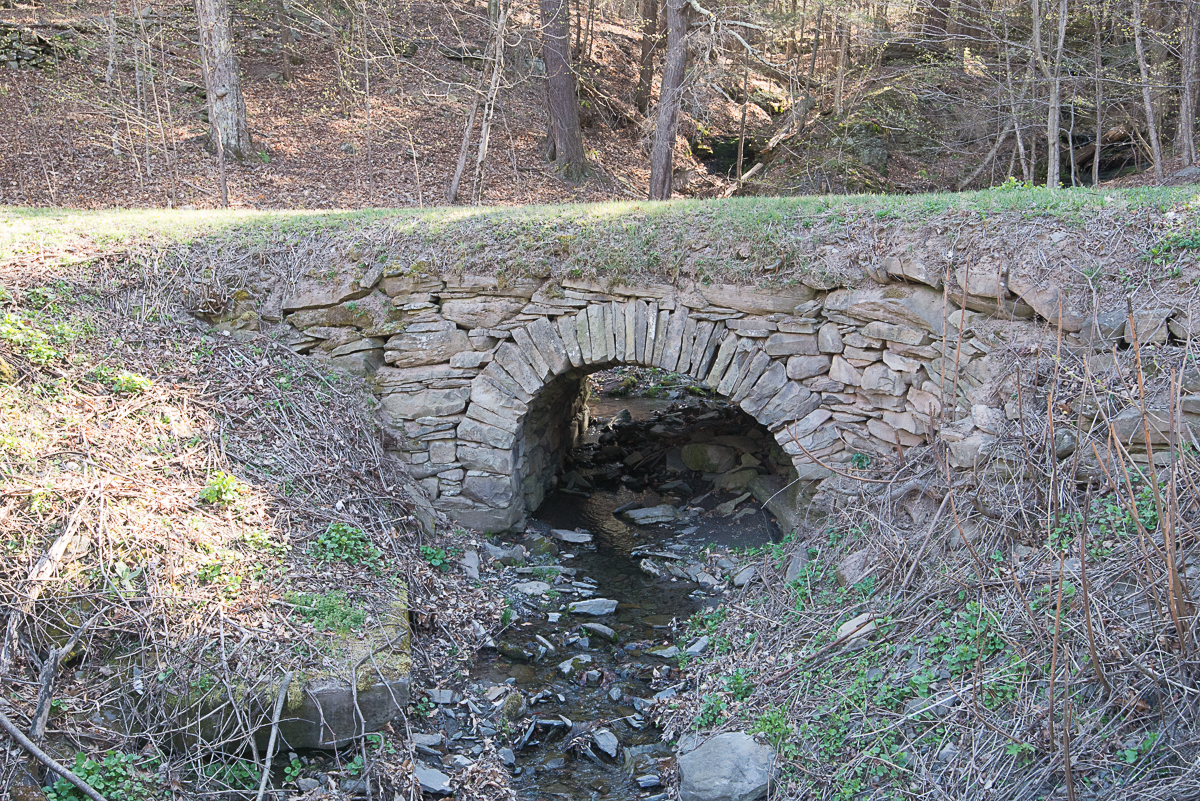
- Bridge in 2016

- Location within New York Location within the United States
- Location: Allan Teator Road, West Durham, New York
- Coordinates: 42°24′27″N 74°13′12″W
- Area: less than one acre
- Built: 1892
- Built by: Cunningham, Jeremiah
- NRHP reference No.: 07001365
- Added to NRHP: January 9, 2008

Allan Teator Road Stone Arch Bridge is a historic stone arch bridge located at West Durham in Greene County, New York. It was constructed in 1892 and is a single span, dry laid limestone bridge with a round arch. It is seven feet (2.1 m) wide. It spans a tributary of Catskill Creek.

It was a work of Durham highway commissioner Jeremiah Cunningham.

It was listed on the National Register of Historic Places in 2008.

== See also ==
- List of bridges and tunnels on the National Register of Historic Places in New York
- National Register of Historic Places listings in Greene County, New York
