= Oliver Avenue Bridge =

- U.S. National Register of Historic Places
- Location within New York Location within the United States
- Location: Oliver Avenue, Middletown, New York
- Coordinates: 41°27′14″N 74°26′0″W
- Area: less than one acre
- Built: 1895
- Built by: Havana Bridge Works
- Architectural style: Pratt Truss
- NRHP reference No.: 84002882
- Added to NRHP: July 19, 1984

Oliver Avenue Bridge was a historic railroad bridge located at Middletown in Orange County, New York. It was built in 1895 by the Havana Bridge Works. It was a single span, metal trough Pratt truss structure measuring 20 feet wide and 105 feet long. The bridge has been demolished.

It was listed on the National Register of Historic Places in 1984.
