= Wilmington Bridge =

- U.S. National Register of Historic Places
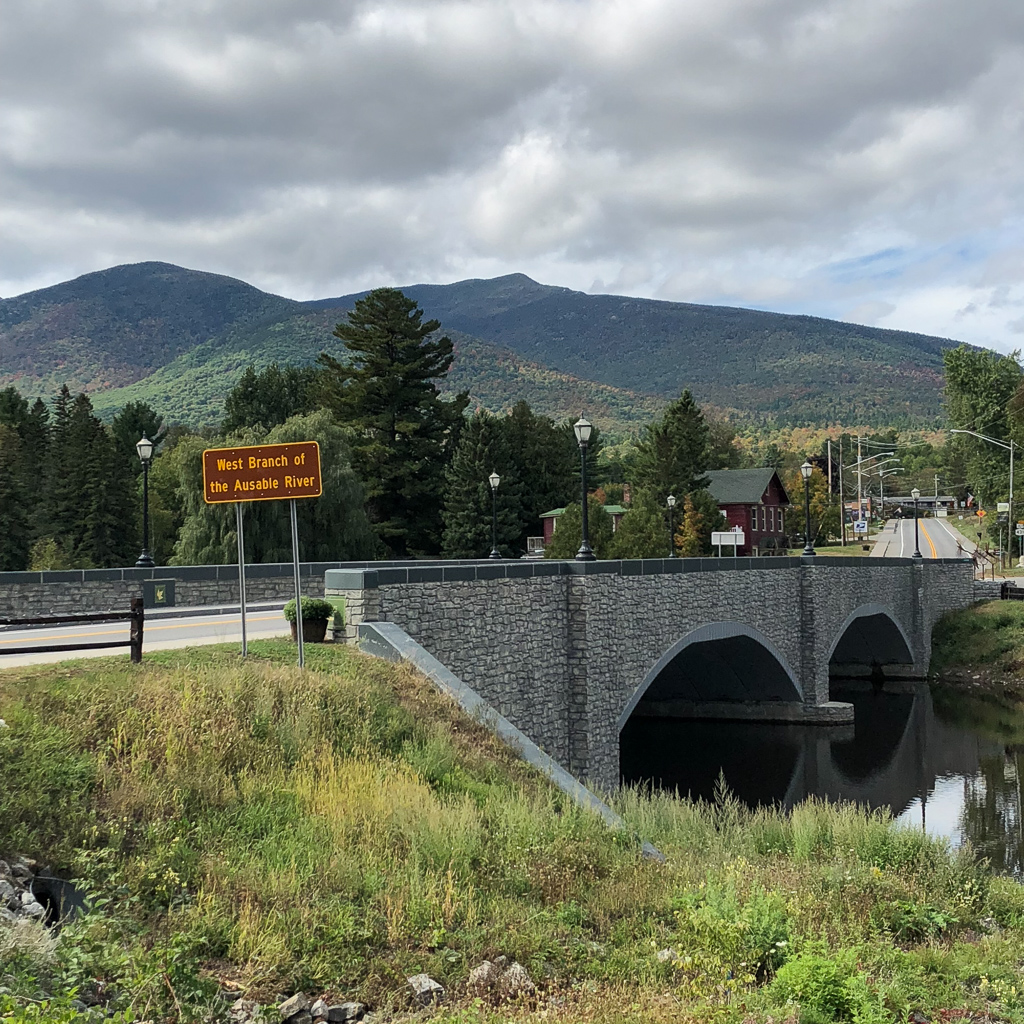
- Replacement bridge

- Location within New York Location within the United States
- Location: NY 86 over AuSable River, Wilmington, New York
- Coordinates: 44°23′20″N 73°49′4″W
- Area: less than one acre
- Built: 1934
- Architect: NYSDPW; C.L. Smith Inc., builder
- Architectural style: Stone faced concrete arch
- MPS: AuSable River Valley Bridges MPS
- NRHP reference No.: 99001324
- Added to NRHP: November 12, 1999

Wilmington Bridge is a historic concrete arch bridge over the Ausable River at Wilmington in Essex County, New York. It was built in 1934 and is an arch bridge faced with stone, 37 feet wide and spanning 160 feet (two 70 feet arch spans) at roughly 24 feet, 8 inches above water level. The bridge is maintained by the New York State Department of Public Works.

It was listed on the National Register of Historic Places in 1999.

The historic bridge was demolished in March 2015 and a new bridge built in its place.
