= Wanakena Footbridge =

- Formerly listed on the U.S. National Register of Historic Places
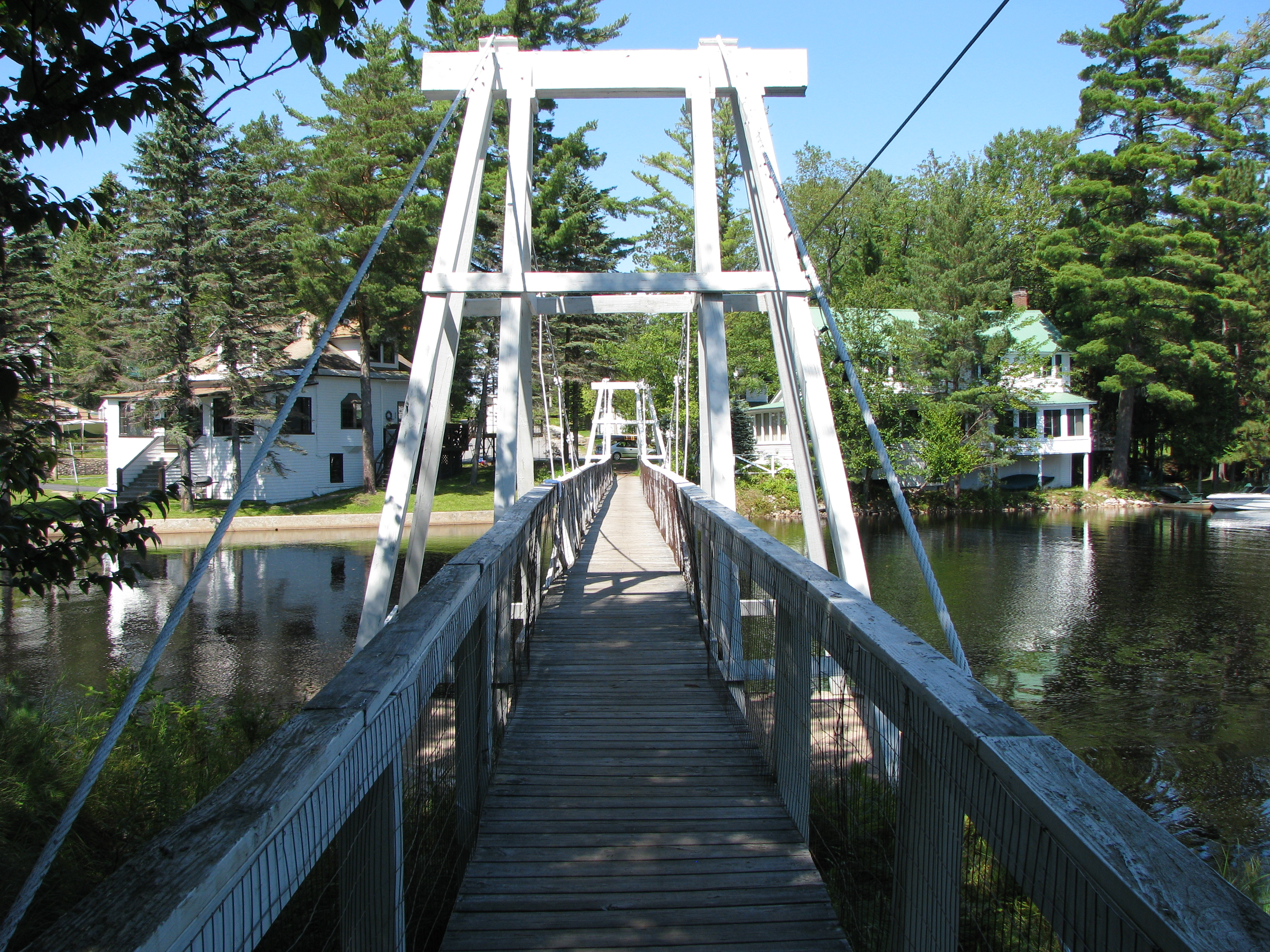
- Wanakena Footbridge, August 2008

- Location within New York Location within the United States
- Location: Over Oswegatchie River, between Front Street and South Shore Road Fine, New York, U.S.
- Coordinates: 44°7′59″N 74°55′18″W
- Area: less than one acre
- Built: 1902
- Architectural style: Suspension bridge
- NRHP reference No.: 99001001

Significant dates
- Added to NRHP: August 19, 1999
- Removed from NRHP: May 3, 2016

The Wanakena Footbridge is a pedestrian suspension bridge located at Wanakena in St. Lawrence County, New York. The original bridge was constructed in 1902 and spanned the Oswegatchie River. It was constructed to provide a crossing for the employees of the Rich Lumber Company to reach the no longer extant mills.

It was listed on the National Register of Historic Places in 1999. In 2014 it was destroyed by an ice jam that floated downstream and collided with the bridge; two years later it was removed from the Register. In July 2016 a new bridge was dedicated and opened after fund raising by the Wanakena Historical Association and others.
