= Beer's Bridge =

- U.S. National Register of Historic Places
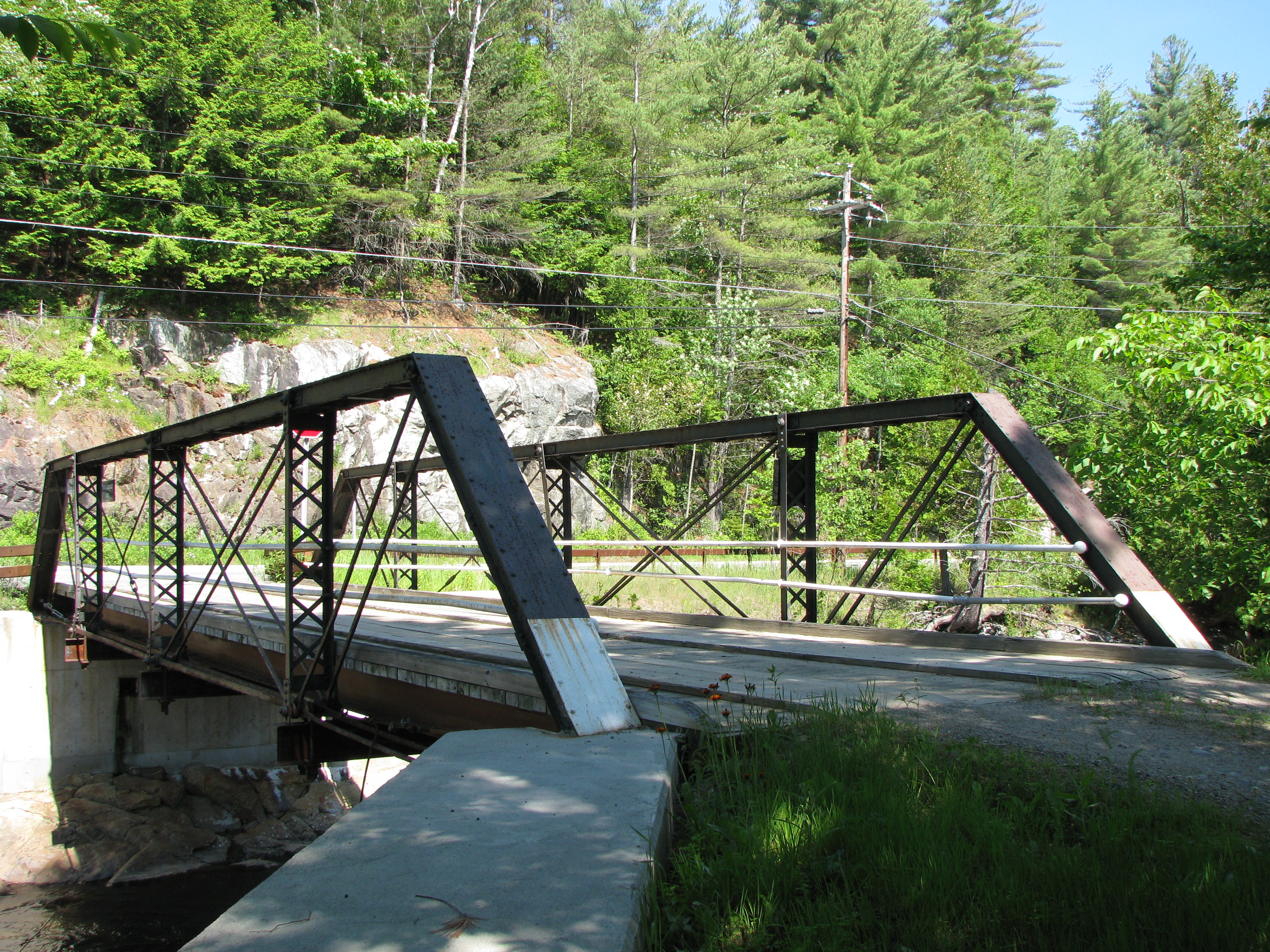
- Beer's Bridge, June 2010

- Location within New York Location within the United States
- Location: Private Road off NY 73 over AuSable River, Keene Valley, New York
- Coordinates: 44°10′11″N 73°46′57″W
- Area: less than one acre
- Built: 1900
- Architect: Pratt, Tomas & Caleb
- Architectural style: Pratt Pony Truss
- MPS: AuSable River Valley Bridges MPS
- NRHP reference No.: 99001327
- Added to NRHP: November 12, 1999

Beer's Bridge is a historic Pratt Pony truss bridge over the Ausable River at Keene Valley in Essex County, New York. It was built in 1900 by the Pratt, Tomas & Caleb Company.

It was listed on the National Register of Historic Places in 1999.
