= Delaware and Hudson Railroad Bridge (Clinton County, New York) =

- U.S. National Register of Historic Places
- Location within New York Location within the United States
- Location: Over AuSable River Northeast of Lakeside Road, Au Sable, New York and Peru, New York
- Coordinates: 44°33′20″N 73°26′5″W
- Built: 1913
- Architect: American Bridge Company
- Architectural style: Warren Steel Truss Bridge
- MPS: AuSable River Valley Bridges MPS
- NRHP reference No.: 99001317
- Added to NRHP: November 12, 1999

Delaware and Hudson Railroad Bridge is a pair of historic Warren Steel Truss bridges over the Ausable River at AuSable and Peru in Clinton County, New York. Also known as the Delaware and Hudson Ausable River Bridge, they were built by the American Bridge Company for the Delaware and Hudson Railway in 1913. The North Bridge is 156 feet in length and the South Bridge 173 feet. They are both 16 feet wide and 25 feet in height.

It was listed on the National Register of Historic Places in 1999.
