= Shaw Bridge =

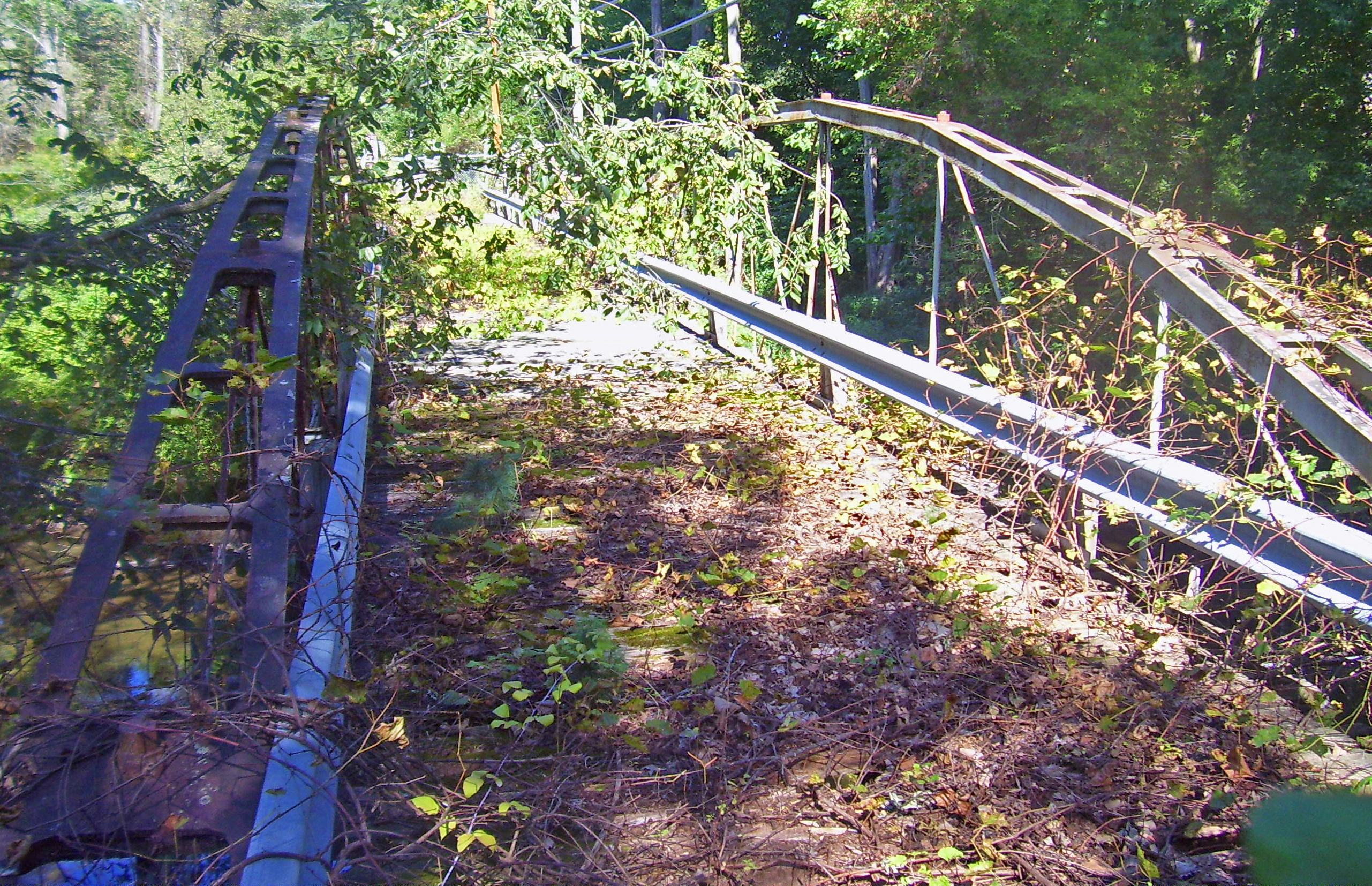
- View from south end, 2008
- Coordinates: 42°12′55″N 73°43′44″W
- Carries: Van Wyck Lane
- Crosses: Claverack Creek
- Locale: Claverack, NY
- Maintained by: Columbia County Department of Public Works
- Heritage status: NRHP #80002598

Characteristics
- Design: Bowstring truss
- Material: Iron, wood
- Total length: 162 feet (49 m)
- Width: 13 feet (4.0 m)
- No. of spans: 2
- Clearance below: 10 feet (3.0 m)

History
- Designer: Squire Whipple
- Constructed by: J. D. Hutchinson
- Opened: 1870

Shaw Bridge, also known as Double-Span Whipple Bowstring Truss Bridge, is a historic bridge in Claverack, New York, United States. It carried Van Wyck Lane over Claverack Creek, but is now closed to all traffic, even pedestrians. It is "a structure of outstanding importance to the history of American engineering and transportation technology." Specifically designed by John D. Hutchinson, the bridge employs the basic design of Squire Whipple. It is the only extant "double" Whipple bowstring truss bridge in the U.S., having two identical spans placed in series over a common pier.

The bridge was listed on the National Register of Historic Places in 1980. Since then its wooden deck has deteriorated to the point where it cannot be used even by pedestrians, and it has been closed.

== Structure ==
The bridge is located in a quiet residential area where houses, some dating to the early 19th century like the nearby Jacob P. Mesick House, are built on large lots. Many tall trees grow in the area, giving it a wooded feel. The creek, a tributary of the Hudson River to the west, is shallow yet wide here. It is 0.1 miles (160 m) east of NY 23/9H, the main north-south route through the Claverack area.

Structurally, the bridge is a bowstring tied arch, regarded as a "double-span" for its two separate yet identical spans supported by end abutments and a center pier of mortared cut limestone blocks. Its lower chord, wrought iron spans between cast iron connecting blocks, is 162 feet (49 m) long, 13 feet (4.0 m) wide and 10.5 feet (3.2 m) above water level. Its upper chords are segmental arches of nine tangential iron castings with their bearing surfaces joined at each panel point. They bear the legend "J. D. Hutchinson, Builder, Troy, N.Y., 1870".

Iron floor beams are suspended from the top chord by vertical round threaded iron rods similar to those that form the diagonal crosses and braces of the truss web. Wood stringers bolted to the iron beams run the length of the spans, and more iron rods cross-brace them. The deck itself consists of wooden planks laid across the stringers and braces. Guard rails on either side protect the trusses.

== History ==
It is possible that the state may have built the bridge. In 1870, Van Wyck Lane was part of the Albany Post Road and the major route through Claverack. Whipple's iron-truss designs had been adopted as the standard bridge type on the Erie Canal; the state may well have decided to use them on highways as well. Builder John D. Hutchinson's father had also built 35 of the canal bridges. It took its name from William Shaw, a nearby property owner.

In 1931 the current routes 23 and 9H were constructed, diverting traffic away from the bridge. It remained in use, with a load limit of 4 tons (3.6 metric tons) through at least 1988. Since then it has been closed to all traffic due to its deteriorated deck. Chainlink fences block the approaches, and tree branches have fallen across the bridge.

As of 2011, a new administration in the town has recognized the historic importance of this bridge. Weeds have been cleared, and the town is seeking funding to allow the bridge to be restored and reopened for pedestrian use. As of 2012, the funding has fallen through.

== See also ==
- List of bridges documented by the Historic American Engineering Record in New York (state)
- List of bridges on the National Register of Historic Places in New York
- National Register of Historic Places listings in Columbia County, New York
