= Andrews Street Bridge =

- U.S. National Register of Historic Places
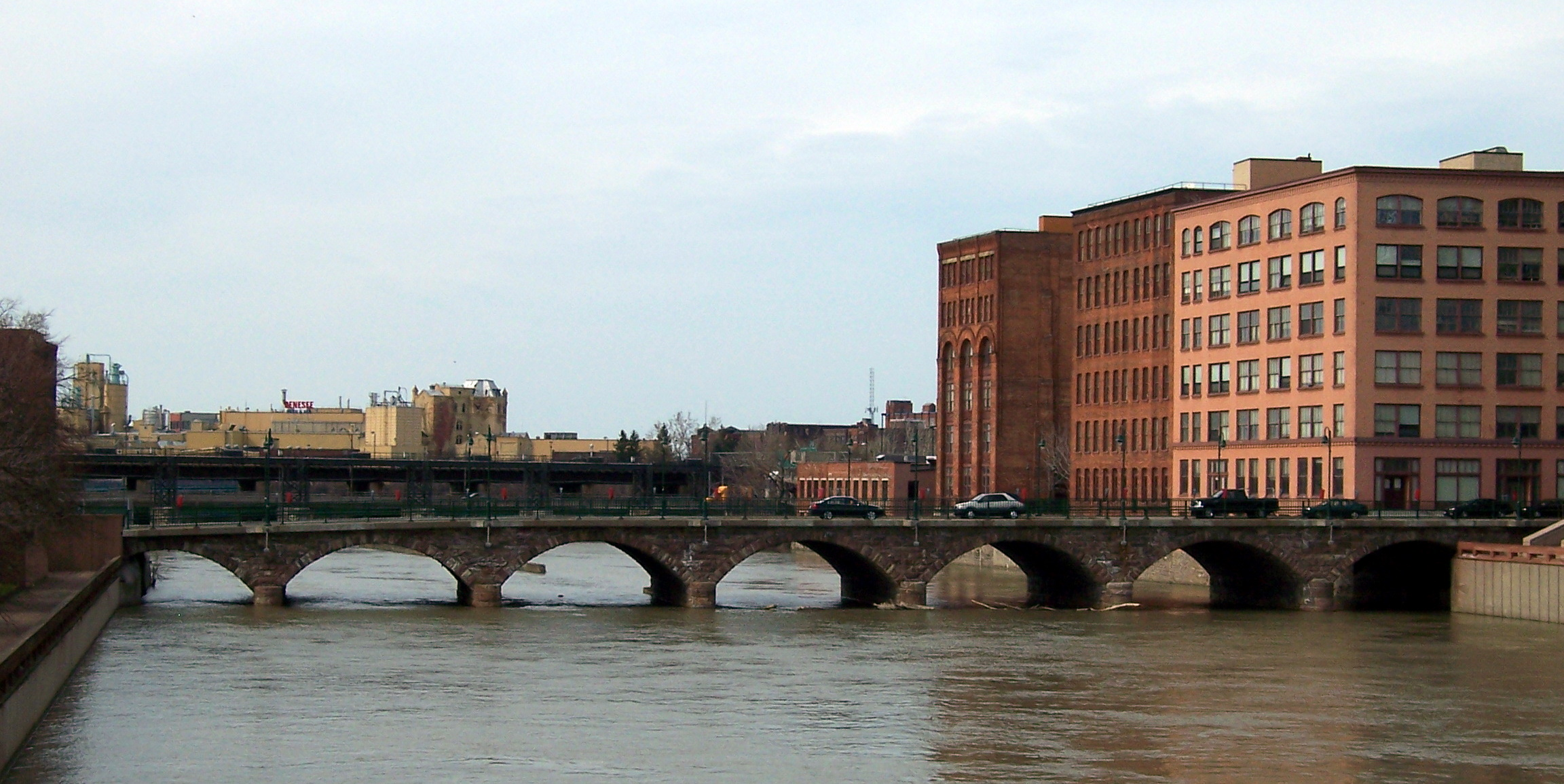
- Andrews Street Bridge from the south, April 2010

- Location within New York Location within the United States
- Location: Andrews Street at Genesee River, Rochester, New York
- Coordinates: 43°9′32″N 77°36′45″W
- Area: less than one acre
- Built: 1893
- Architect: McClintock, J. Y.; Ellsworth & Grant
- MPS: Stone Arch Bridge TR
- NRHP reference No.: 84000182
- Added to NRHP: October 11, 1984

Andrews Street Bridge is a historic stone arch bridge located at Rochester in Monroe County, New York. It was designed by city engineer J. Y. McClintock, constructed in 1893, and spans the Genesee River. It has seven segmental arches with spans of 36 feet and rises of nine feet.

It was listed on the National Register of Historic Places in 1984.
