= Walton Bridge (Keene, New York) =

- U.S. National Register of Historic Places
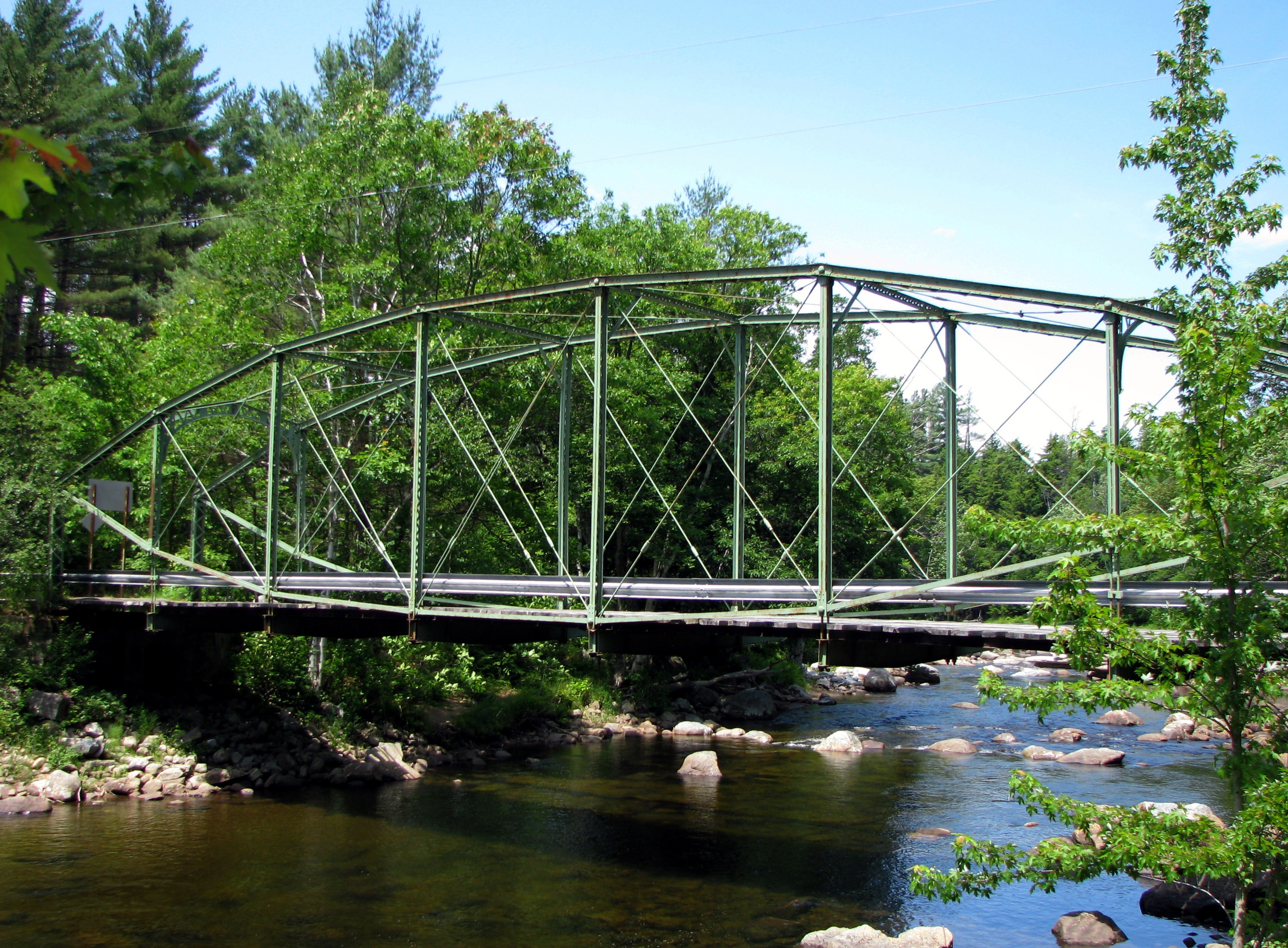

- Location within New York Location within the United States
- Location: Dr. Ray Road (Old Grist Mill Road) AuSable River, Keene, New York
- Coordinates: 44°14′41″N 73°47′53″W
- Area: less than one acre
- Built: c. 1890
- Architect: Berlin Iron Bridge Company
- Architectural style: Lenticular Through Truss
- MPS: AuSable River Valley Bridges MPS
- NRHP reference No.: 99001326
- Added to NRHP: November 12, 1999

The Walton Bridge in Keene, New York was built in c. 1890. It was listed on the National Register of Historic Places in 1999. It was destroyed in the flooding caused by Tropical Storm Irene on August 29, 2011.

== History ==
From the registration form for the National Register:

The Walton Bridge was originally constructed c.1890 for the Western Plank Road Company in the hamlet of Black Brook, New York, in (Clinton County, NY) to cross a stream known as Black Brook. The bridge was part of a 14-mile toll road between Black Brook and Franklin controlled by the Western Plank Road Company, which was incorporated in 1850.

The Walton Bridge was manufactured and erected by the Berlin Iron Bridge Company (BIBC) of East Berlin, Connecticut. The BIBC, which was formed in 1883, evolved from a series of iron manufacturing businesses (American Corrugated Iron Co., 1868; Metallic Corrugated Shingle Co., 1871; and Corrugated Metal Co., 1873) that made corrugated iron, fireproof shutters and doors and iron roof trusses. In the late 1870s, the Corrugated Metal Company bought the rights to William 0. Douglas's patented lenticular bridge truss design and entered into the bridge fabricating market. By 1883, most of its business was in bridge fabrication and its name was changed to reflect this.

While Berlin Iron Bridge Company (BIBC) did manufacture bridges of other designs, it primarily built lenticular truss bridges. In all, about 1,000 lenticular truss bridges were fabricated by the BIBC between 1878 and the late 1890s and they were sold as far away as San Antonio, Texas. BIB grew to become the largest structural fabricator in New England and was acquired by the American Bridge Company in 1900. The East Berlin factories were eventually dismantled and moved to the new plant in Pennsylvania. In 1925, the bridge that crossed Black Brook was determined to be obsolete and replaced by a more substantial span. It was then moved to its present location in the Town of Keene to replace a bridge that had been washed away in a flood along with its abutments. A 1924 report of the Essex County Bridge Committee states that the original Walton Bridge "...was replaced by an old iron bridge obtained by the Town of Keene from its old site in the Town of Black Brook, being placed on the abutments newly built by the Bridge Committee".

What is known about earlier bridge crossings at the Walton Bridge site in Keene, is that the Heald family had farms on both sides of the river and were involved in nearby iron mines and a sawmill. In the mid-19th century, they may have built the first bridge at this location, which was likely to have been a simple wooden truss span. The volatile nature of the river at this location is reported to have washed away several 19th-century bridges that were built lower to the river.

The bridge that had become obsolete in Black Brook was ideally suited to its new site in Keene. On its higher abutments, protected from the torrents of the river, the Walton Bridge has served this small crossing and unimproved road well and provides a good example of how bridges were moved and reused in other locations. The bridge stayed in active service until 1990, when the Essex County Highway Department decided that, because there was another access to the Dr. Ray Road (Old Gristmill Road), it was not essential and could be closed. It remained in use as a pedestrian bridge between Old Gristmill and Hulls Falls Roads.

On August 28, 2011, the bridge was destroyed by the force of floodwaters that followed the rains of Tropical Storm Irene. The bridge in its entirety was washed downstream in pieces, with some lingering in the riverbed near its former site, and others assumed to be far downstream.
