= Brand Hollow Road Stone Arch Bridge =

- U.S. National Register of Historic Places
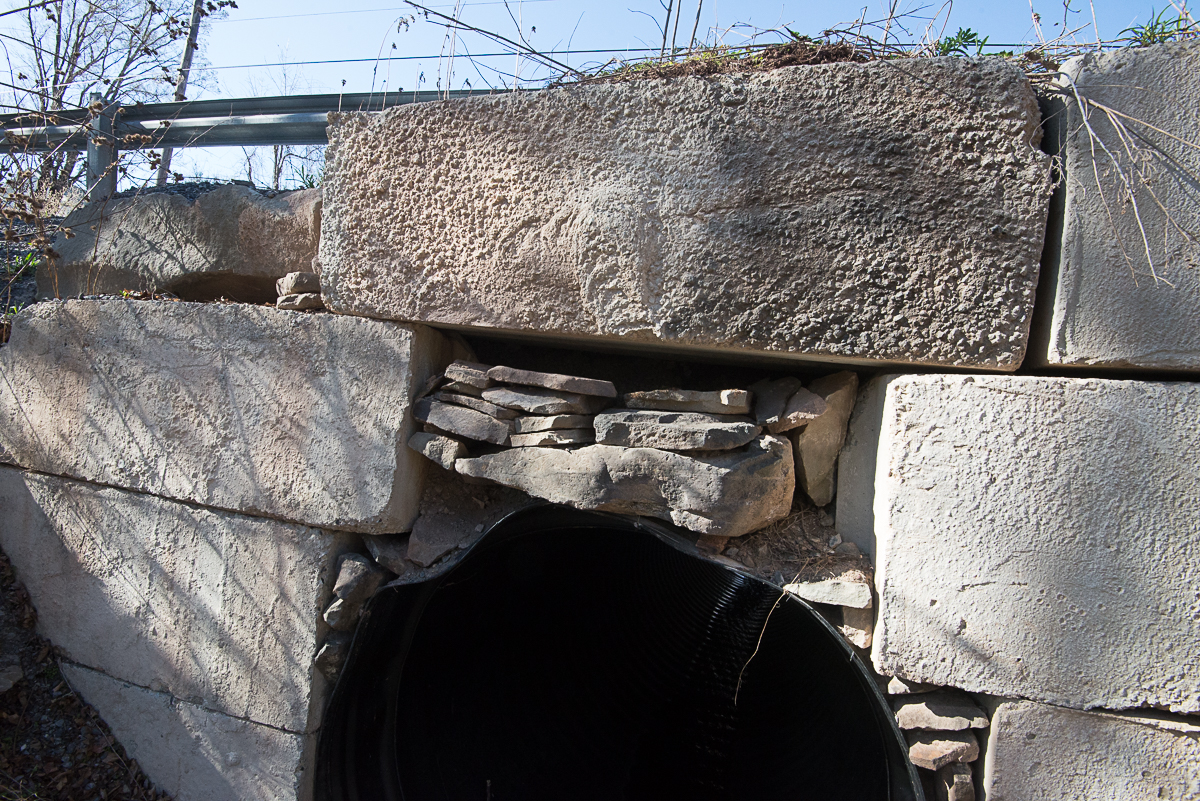
- Bridge in 2016

- Location within New York Location within the United States
- Nearest city: West Durham, New York
- Coordinates: 42°24′12″N 74°14′22″W
- Area: less than one acre
- Built: 1892
- Architect: Cunningham, Jeremiah
- NRHP reference No.: 08000271
- Added to NRHP: April 10, 2008

Brand Hollow Road Stone Arch Bridge is a historic stone arch bridge located at West Durham in Greene County, New York. It was constructed by Jeremiah Cunningham in 1892–1893, and is a single span, dry laid limestone bridge with a round arch. It is eight feet (2.4 m) wide, with a span of four and a half feet (1.4 m).

It was listed on the National Register of Historic Places in 2008.
