= Salisbury Turnpike Bridge =

- U.S. National Register of Historic Places
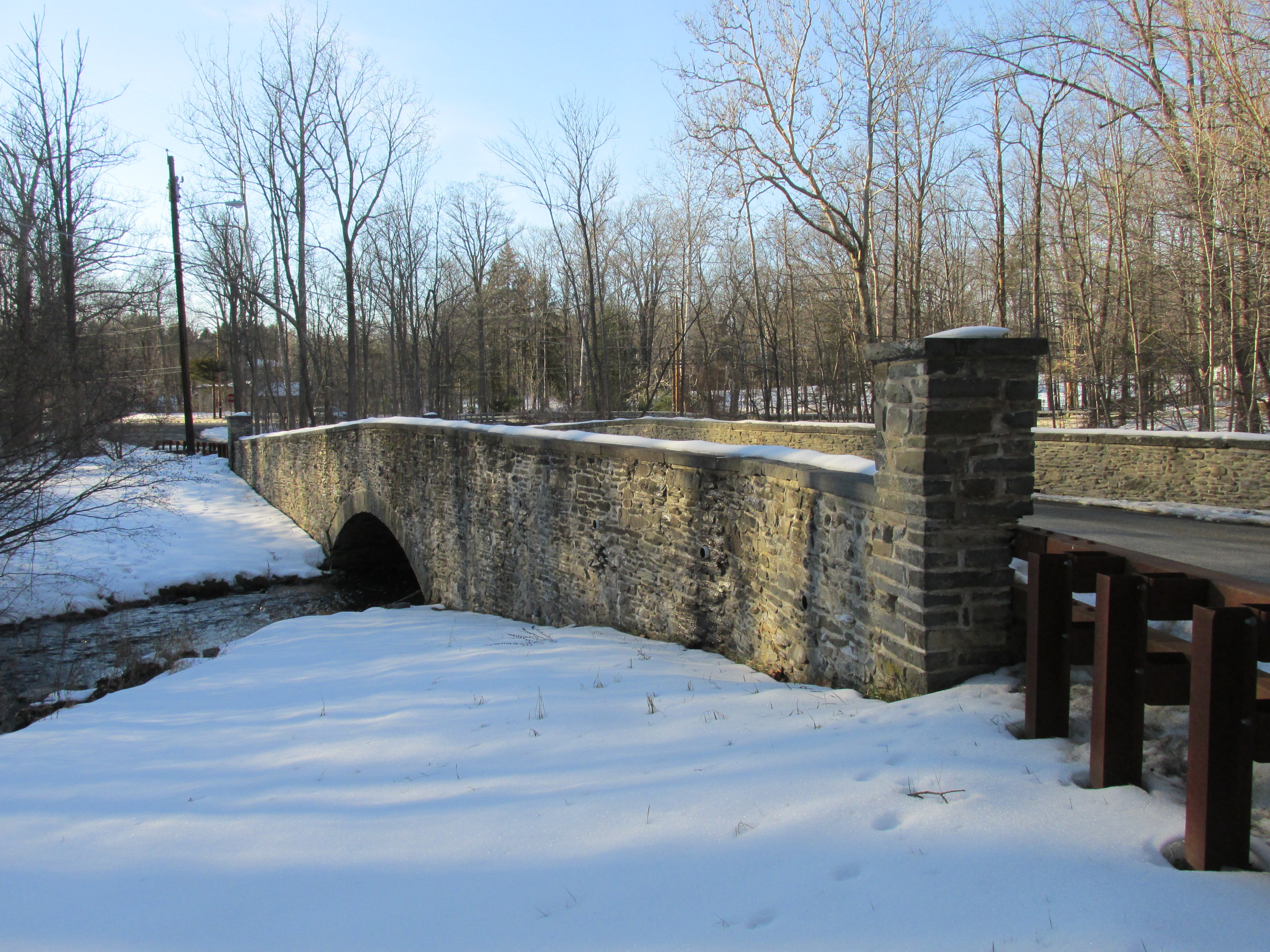
- Salisbury Turnpike Bridge, January 2013

- Location within New York Location within the United States
- Location: Old Turnpike Road, Rhinebeck, New York
- Coordinates: 41.93986°N 73.88008°W
- Area: less than one acre
- Built: 1858
- MPS: Rhinebeck Town MRA
- NRHP reference No.: 87001100
- Added to NRHP: July 9, 1987

Salisbury Turnpike Bridge is a historic stone arch bridge located at Rhinebeck, Dutchess County, New York. It was built in 1858 and is a single span stone masonry structure built of mortared random fieldstone. Pilgrim's Progress Road Bridge is about 500 feet (150 m) southeast of this bridge.

It was added to the National Register of Historic Places in 1987.
