= Lower Dock Hill Road Stone Arch Bridge =

- U.S. National Register of Historic Places
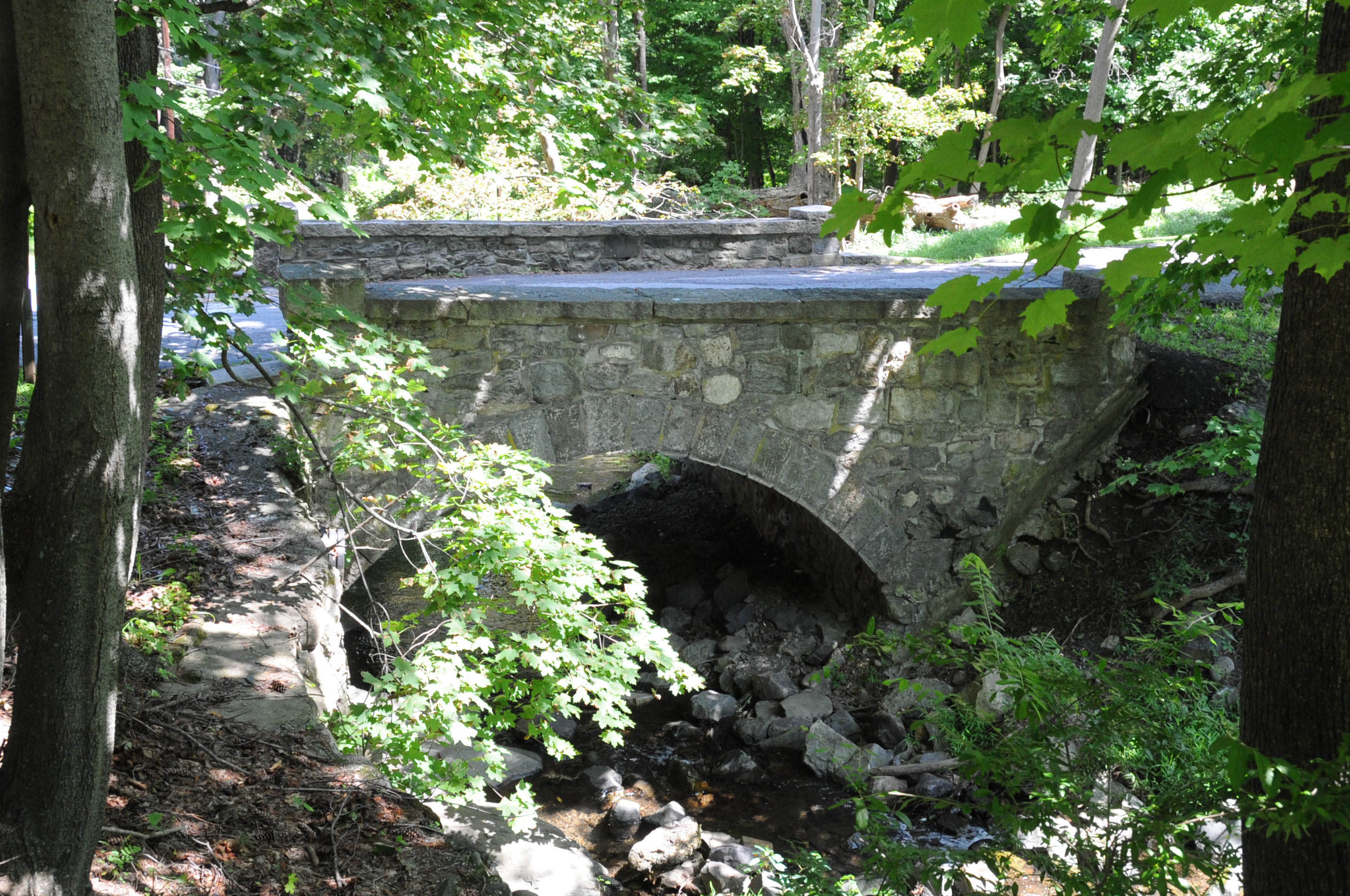

- Location within New York Location within the United States
- Location: Dock Hill Road, Cornwall-on-Hudson, New York
- Coordinates: 41°26′42″N 74°0′12″W
- Area: less than one acre
- Built: c. 1850
- MPS: Stone Arch Bridges of the Village of Cornwall-on-Hudson, New York
- NRHP reference No.: 10000227
- Added to NRHP: April 28, 2010

Lower Dock Hill Road Stone Arch Bridge is a historic stone arch bridge located at Cornwall on Hudson in Orange County, New York, United States. It was built about 1850, and is constructed of locally quarried stone.

It was listed on the National Register of Historic Places in 2010.
