= Pilgrim's Progress Road Bridge =

- U.S. National Register of Historic Places
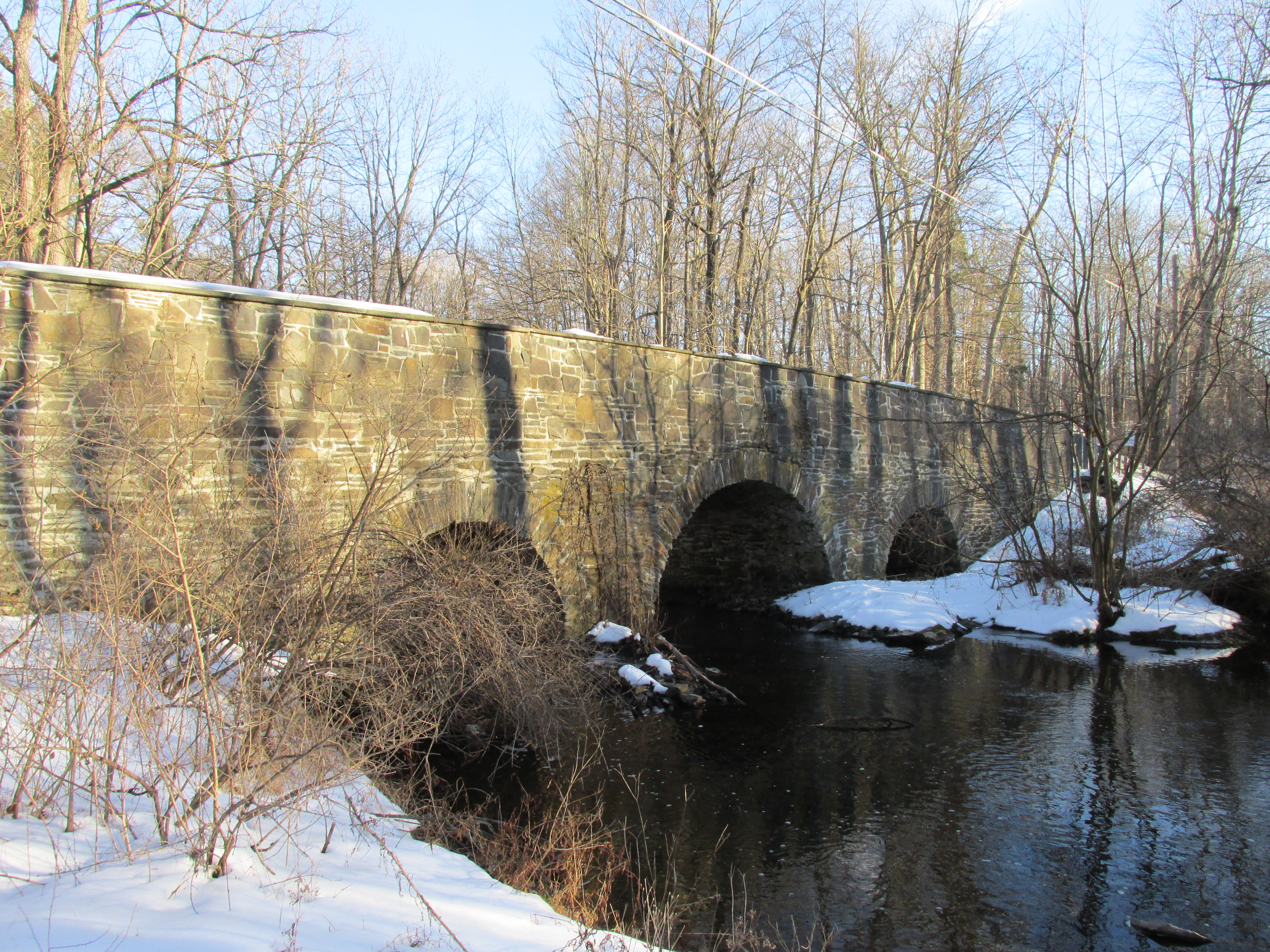
- Pilgrims Progress Road Bridge, January 2013

- Location within New York Location within the United States
- Location: Miller Road South of NY 308, Rhinebeck, New York
- Coordinates: 41.93908°N 73.87916°W
- Area: less than one acre
- Built: c. 1858
- MPS: Rhinebeck Town MRA
- NRHP reference No.: 87001102
- Added to NRHP: July 9, 1987

Pilgrim's Progress Road Bridge is a historic stone arch bridge located at Rhinebeck, Dutchess County, New York. It was built about 1858 and is a triple arch stone masonry structure built of mortared random fieldstone.

The bridge is one of two stone bridges that carry Miller Road over Landsman Kill, the first, Salisbury Turnpike Bridge, is a single arch bridge east of New York State Route 308. Pilgrim's Progress bridge is found south of School House Lane, after Miller Road turns from east to south. It was added to the National Register of Historic Places in 1987.
