= Palmer Brook Bridge =

- U.S. National Register of Historic Places
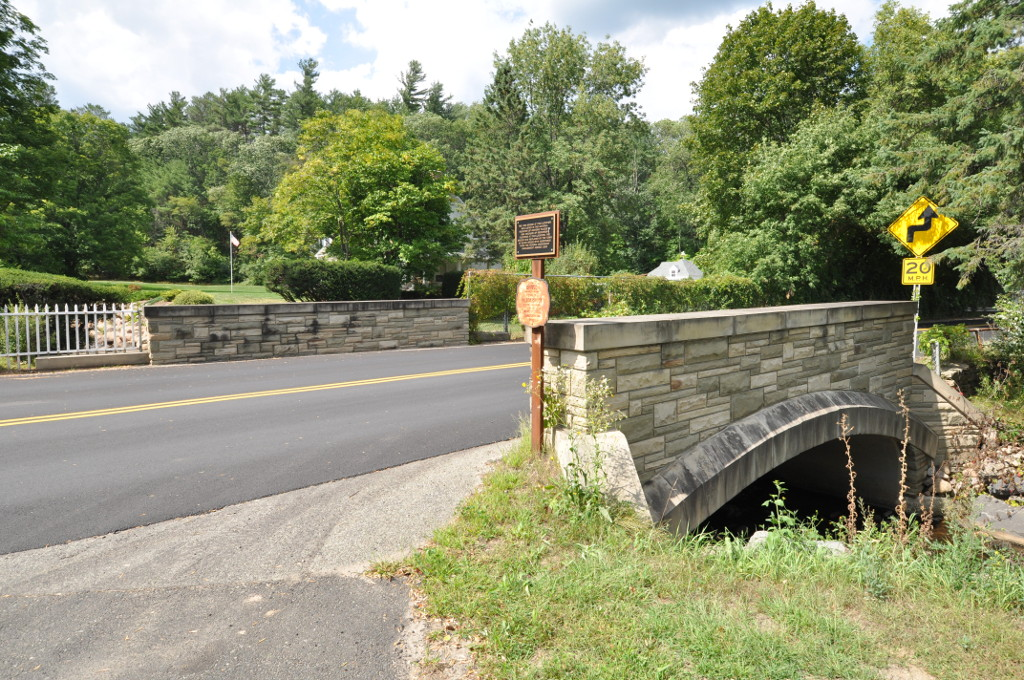
- The 2003 bridge, with sign explaining replacement

- Location within New York Location within the United States
- Location: Golf Course Road over Palmer Brook, AuSable Forks, New York
- Coordinates: 44°26′37″N 73°40′29″W
- Area: less than one acre
- Built: 1938
- Architectural style: stone-faced concrete arch
- MPS: AuSable River Valley Bridges MPS
- NRHP reference No.: 99001318
- Added to NRHP: November 12, 1999

Palmer Brook Bridge is a historic stone faced, concrete arch bridge over the Ausable River at AuSable Forks in Clinton County, New York. It was built in 1938 with assistance from the Works Progress Administration. The bridge is 25 feet (7.6 m) in length, 15 feet (4.6 m) wide, and six feet (1.8 m) in height.

It was listed on the National Register of Historic Places in 1999. The bridge was replaced in 2003 with a modern bridge that appears stylistically similar.
