= Notman Bridge =

- U.S. National Register of Historic Places
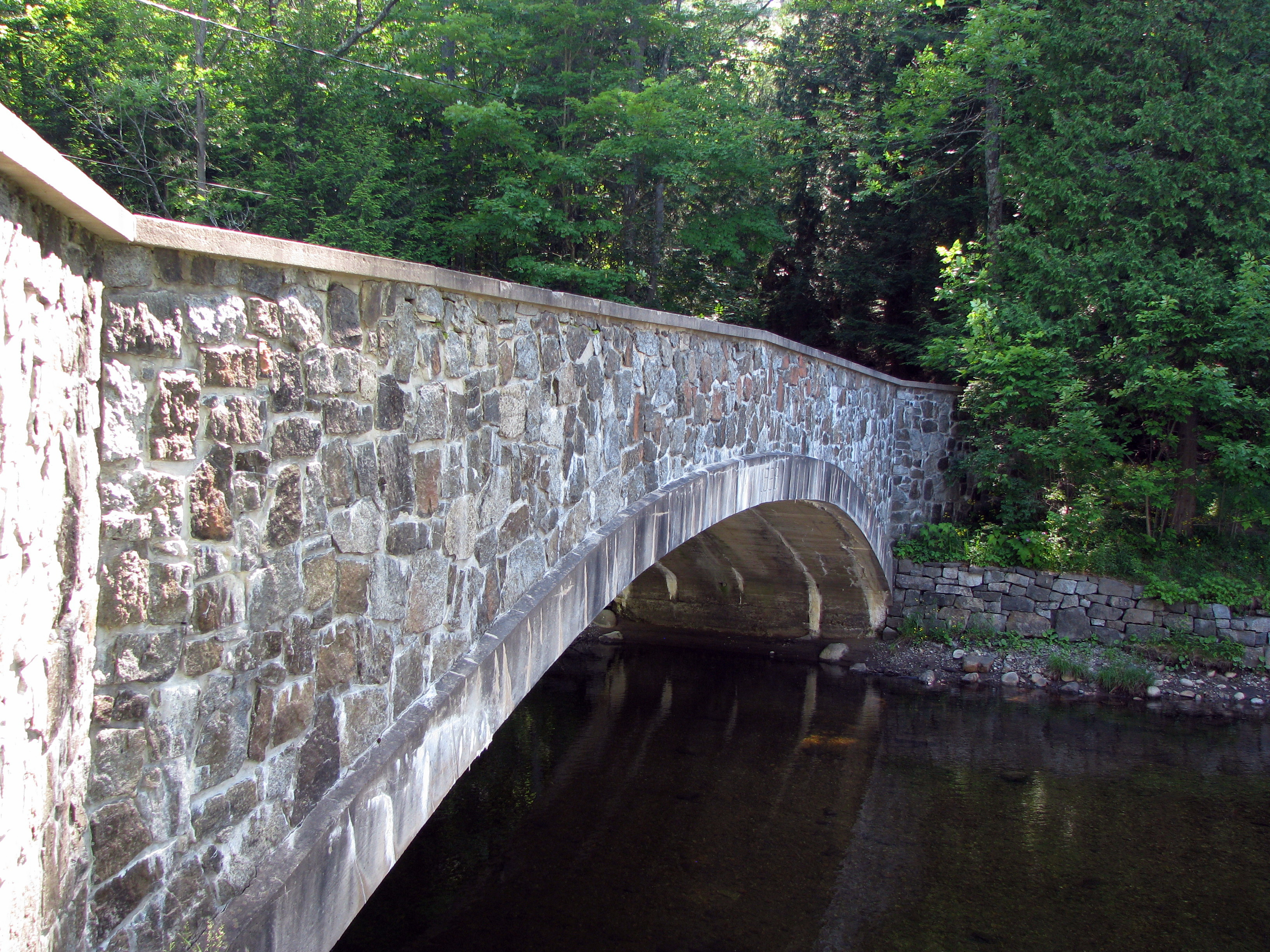
- Notman Bridge, June 2010

- Location within New York Location within the United States
- Location: Country Club Road over AuSable River, Keene Valley, New York
- Coordinates: 44°11′29″N 73°47′5″W
- Area: less than one acre
- Built: 1913
- Architect: Edmonds, Clarence, builder
- Architectural style: stone-faced, concrete arch
- MPS: AuSable River Valley Bridges MPS
- NRHP reference No.: 99001328
- Added to NRHP: November 12, 1999

Notman Bridge is a historic concrete arch bridge over the Ausable River at Keene Valley in Essex County, New York. It was built in 1913 and is an arch bridge faced with stone, 16 feet wide and spanning 62 feet, 6 inches at roughly 14 feet above water level. The bridge is privately owned and access is through the Keene Valley Country Club.

It was listed on the National Register of Historic Places in 1999.
