= Old State Road Bridge =

- U.S. National Register of Historic Places
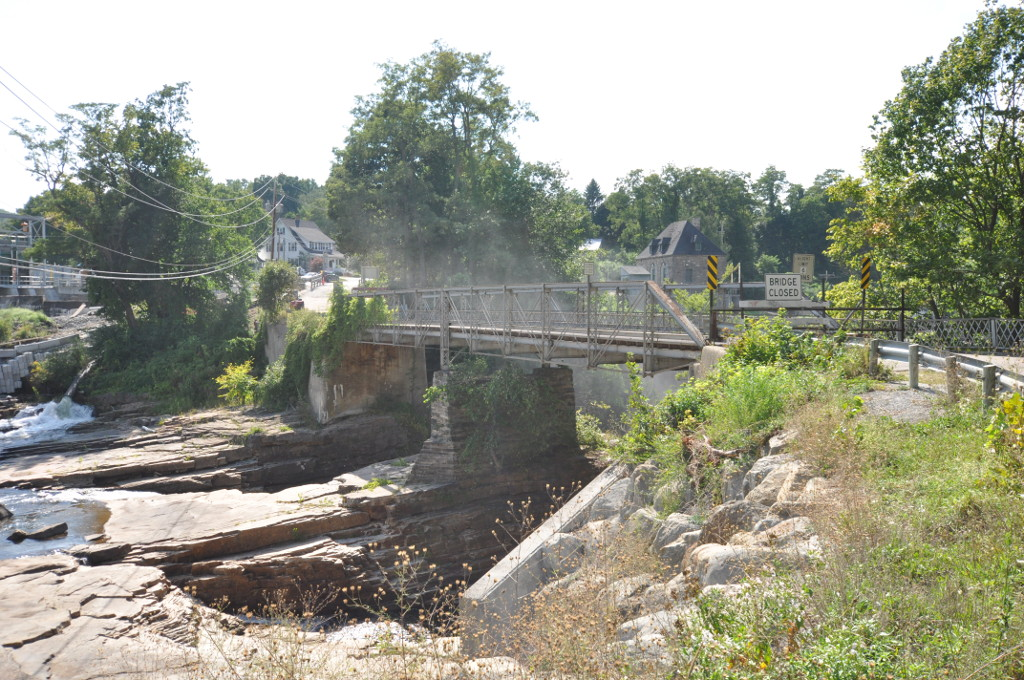

- Location within New York Location within the United States
- Location: Co. Route 17B over Ausable River, AuSable Chasm and Chesterfield, New York
- Coordinates: 44°31′25″N 73°27′37″W
- Area: less than one acre
- Built: 1890
- Architectural style: Pratt Pony Truss Bridge
- MPS: AuSable River Valley Bridges MPS
- NRHP reference No.: 99001319
- Added to NRHP: November 12, 1999

Old State Road Bridge is a historic Pratt Pony Truss bridge over the Ausable River at AuSable Chasm and Chesterfield in Clinton and Essex County, New York. It was built in 1890. The bridge is 107 feet (32.6 m) in length, 23 feet (7 m) wide, and 10 feet (3 m) in height.

It was listed on the National Register of Historic Places in 1999.
