= Moore Road Stone Arch Bridge =

- U.S. National Register of Historic Places
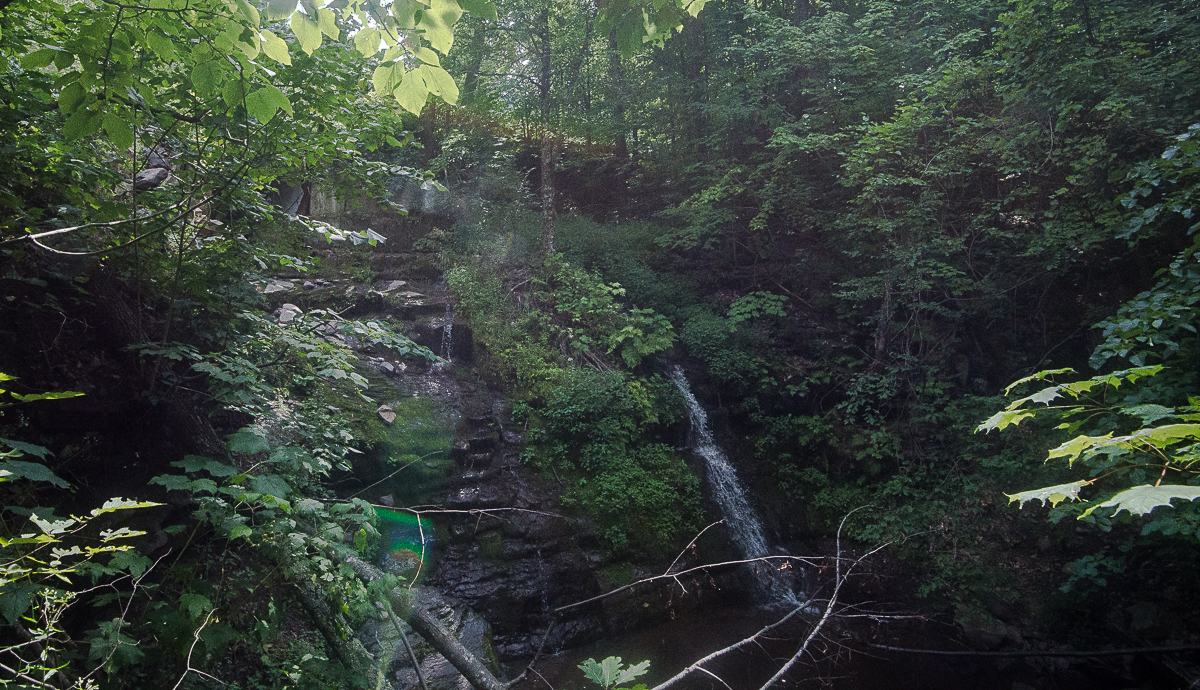

- Location within New York Location within the United States
- Location: Moore Road, Cornwallville, New York
- Coordinates: 42.3530°N 74.1720°W
- Area: less than one acre
- Built: 1887
- Built by: Cunningham, Jeremiah
- NRHP reference No.: 08000272
- Added to NRHP: April 10, 2008

Moore Road Stone Arch Bridge is a historic stone arch bridge located at Cornwallville in Greene County, New York. It was constructed in 1887, and is a single-span, dry laid limestone structure with a round arch. Jeremiah Cunningham was the builder.

It was listed on the National Register of Historic Places in 2008.
