= Shady Glen Road Stone Arch Bridge =

- U.S. National Register of Historic Places
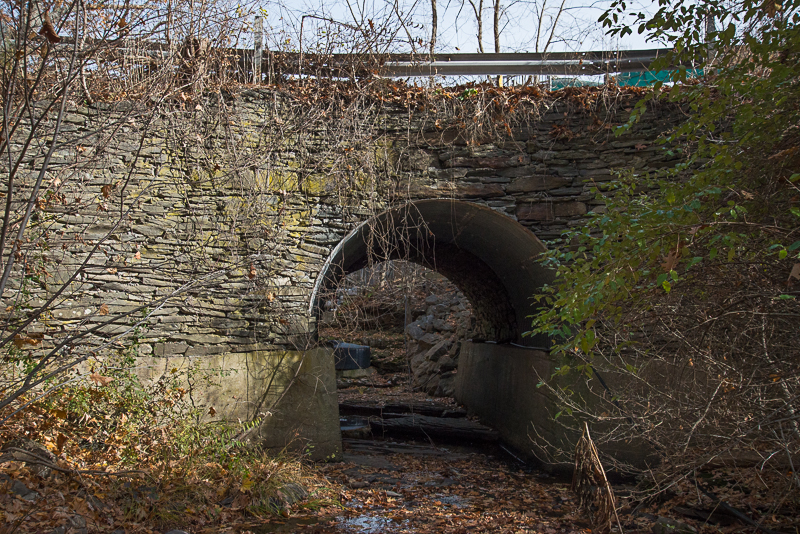

- Location within New York Location within the United States
- Nearest city: Cornwallville, New York
- Coordinates: 42°22′47″N 74°8′44″W
- Area: less than one acre
- Built: 1886
- Built by: Cunningham, Jeremiah
- NRHP reference No.: 07001368
- Added to NRHP: January 9, 2008

Shady Glen Road Stone Arch Bridge, also known as Elliotts' Bridge, is a historic stone arch bridge located at Cornwallville in Greene County, New York. It was constructed in 1886 and is a single span, dry laid limestone bridge with a round arch. It spans an unnamed tributary of Catskill Creek.

It was built by Jeremiah Cunningham.

It was listed on the National Register of Historic Places in 2008.
