= List of things named after Rembrandt =

Rembrandt is seen here in his Self-Portrait with Beret and Turned-Up Collar.

Rembrandt Harmenszoon van Rijn (1606–1669) is one of the most famous artists in history.

The following is a list of things named after Rembrandt.

== Arts ==
- Rembrandtesque
- Rembrandt lighting
- Rembrandt Research Project
- Rembrandt House Museum
- Rembrandt Award

== Places, buildings, structures, and monuments ==
- Rembrandtplein, Amsterdam
- Rembrandtpark, Amsterdam
- Rembrandt, Iowa, USA
- Rembrandt Tower, Amsterdam
- Rembrandt Hall, Keeseville, New York
- Rembrandt Gardens, Tampa, Florida
- Rembrandt Garden, City of Westminster, London
- The Rembrandt Hotel, London
- The Rembrandt, 31 Jane Street, Manhattan, New York
- Rembrandt Street, Petervale, Sandton, Gauteng, South Africa
- Rembrandt Park, Johannesburg, Gauteng, South Africa
- Rembrandt Ridge, Johannesburg, Gauteng, South Africa
- Rembrandt Street, Carlingford, New South Wales, Australia
- Rembrandt Road, Cape Town, Western Cape, South Africa
- Avenue Rembrandt, Côte-Saint-Luc, Quebec, Canada
- Rue Rembrandt, Paris, France
- Rembrandt Hotel, Bangkok, Thailand
- Rembrandt's Restaurant and Bar, Fairmount, Philadelphia

== Other uses ==
- Rembrandt (crater), an impact basin on Mercury
- Rembrandt (horse), an Olympic-level dressage horse
- Rembrandt (train), a European train service launched in 1967
- SS Rembrandt, a 1959-built ocean liner (1997–2003)
- S/V Rembrandt van Rĳn, a 1924-built tall ship (since 1995)
- Rembrandt toothpaste, an American dental cosmetics line
- Rembrandt Films, an American production company founded by William L. Snyder
- Rembrandt Group, officially known as Rembrandt Trust Limited, a South African tobacco and industrial company founded by Anton Rupert
- Rembrandt Enterprises, Inc., also known as Rembrandt Foods, an American company based in Okoboji, Iowa
- The Rembrandts, an American pop-rock band
- Z7 Operation Rembrandt, a 1966 German-Italian-Spanish film
- Rembrandt Institute for Cardiovascular Science, a Dutch scientific collaboration
- REMBRANDT (REpository for Molecular BRAin Neoplasia DaTa), a cancer clinical genomics database and a Web-based data mining

== See also ==
- Rembrandt Peale
- Rembrandt Bugatti
- Rembrandt C. Robinson
- Rembrandt Brown
- Giovanni Battista Piranesi, dubbed "the Rembrandt of architecture"
- Milton Caniff, dubbed "the Rembrandt of the comic strip"
- Thomas Carlyle, dubbed "the Rembrandt of English prose"
- Cultural depictions of Rembrandt
- List of works about Rembrandt
