= Bridges of Keeseville =

Three historic bridges in Keeseville, New York, USA

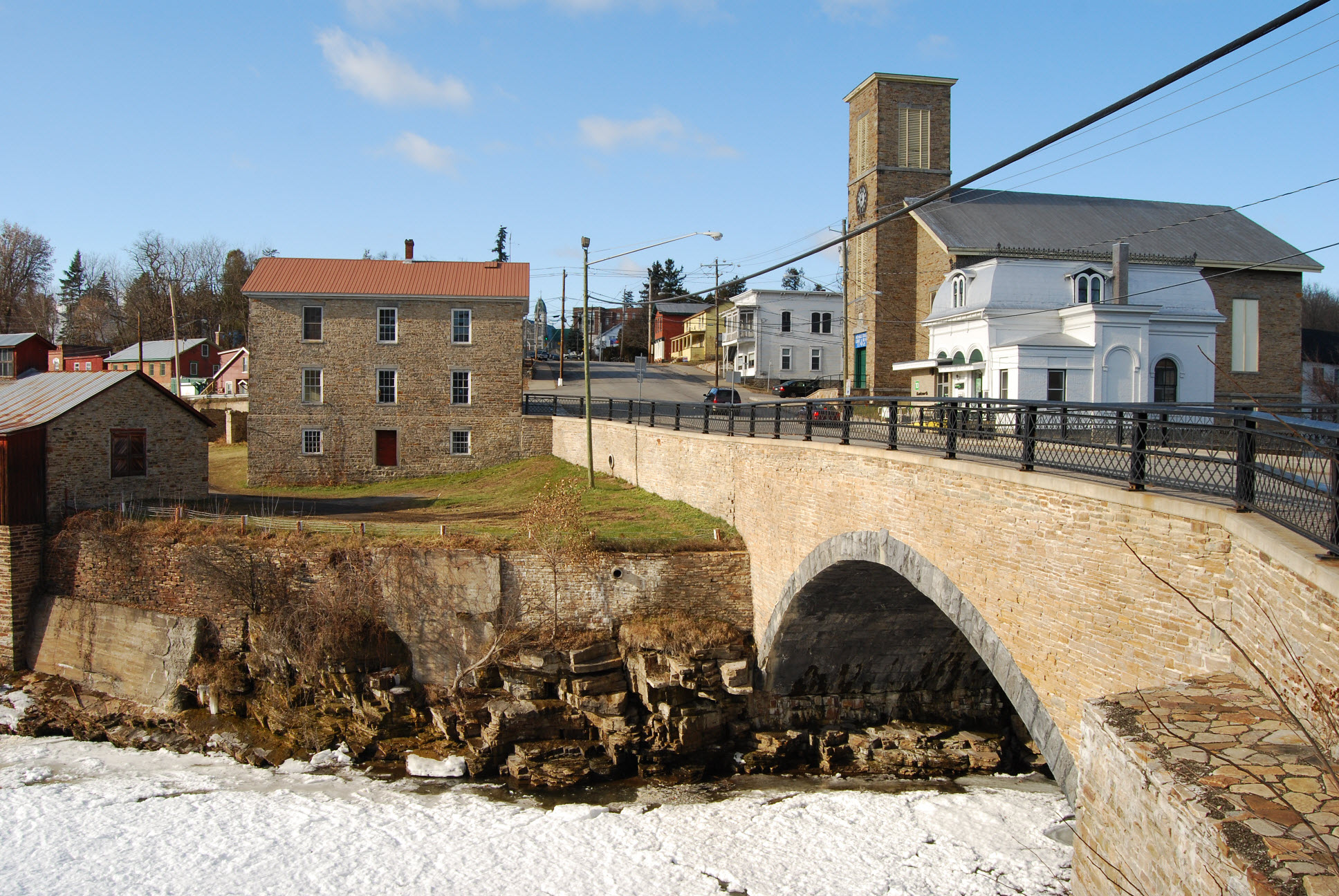
Keeseville Stone Arch Bridge, built 1843

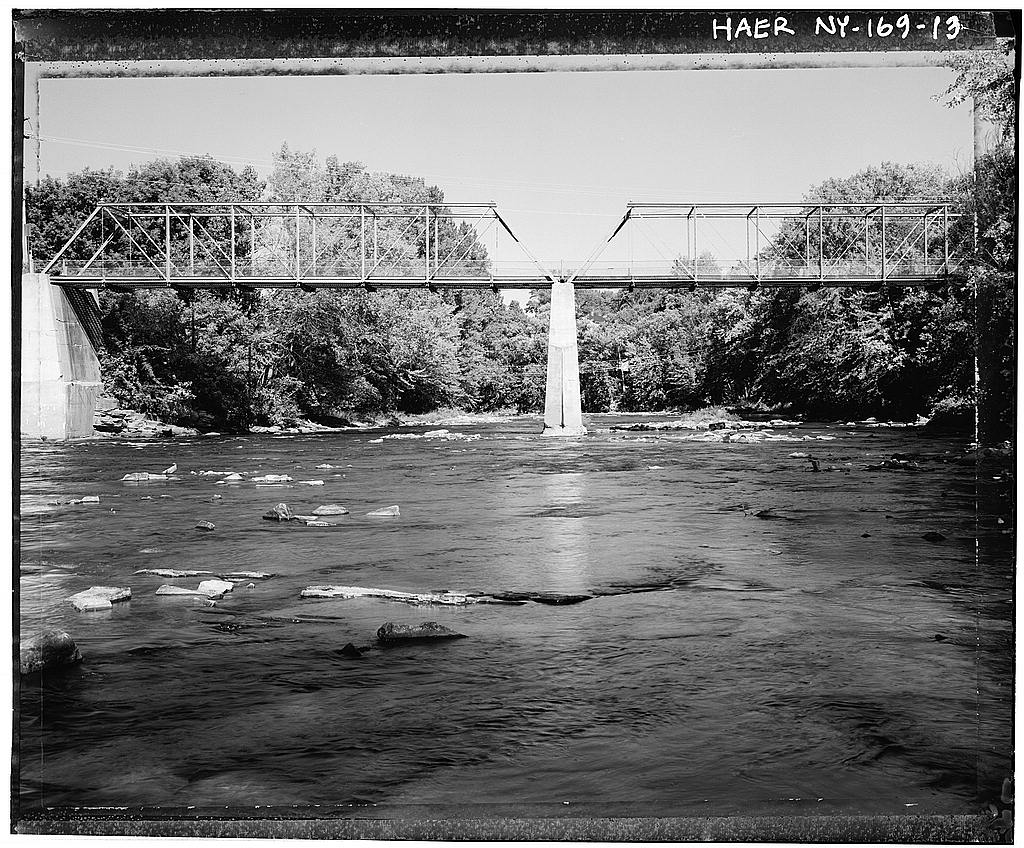
Upper Bridge, built 1878

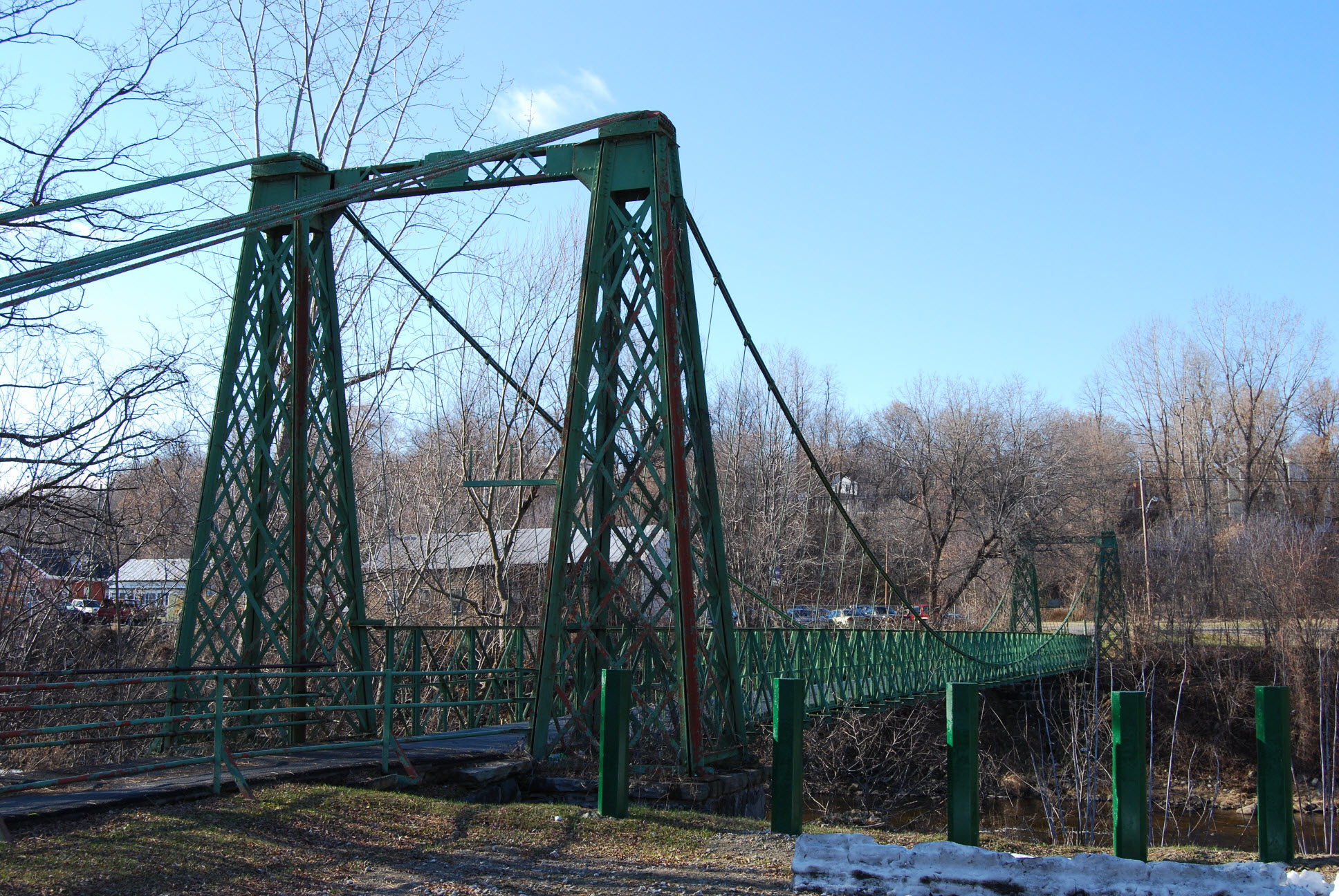
Keeseville Suspension Bridge, built 1888

The Bridges of Keeseville consist of three historic bridges located in Keeseville, New York, spanning the Ausable River. These bridges include a stone arch bridge constructed in 1843, a wrought iron Pratt truss bridge (1878) and a twisted wire cable suspension footbridge built in 1888. These three bridges represent the evolution of 19th-century bridge design, and together were designated a National Historic Civil Engineering Landmark by the American Society of Civil Engineers in 1987.

The 1878 iron truss bridge (also known as "Upper Bridge") sits on the Essex-Clinton county line, located south of the Keeseville village center. In 2008 it was closed, and is in need of repairs.

A fourth non-historic bridge can be found northeast of these bridges. This bridge carries US 9/NY 22 over the Ausable River just before NY 22 leaves the overlap with US 9 at the northern terminus of NY 9N.

== See also ==
- List of bridges documented by the Historic American Engineering Record in New York (state)
- List of historic civil engineering landmarks
