= Carpenter's Flats Bridge =

- U.S. National Register of Historic Places
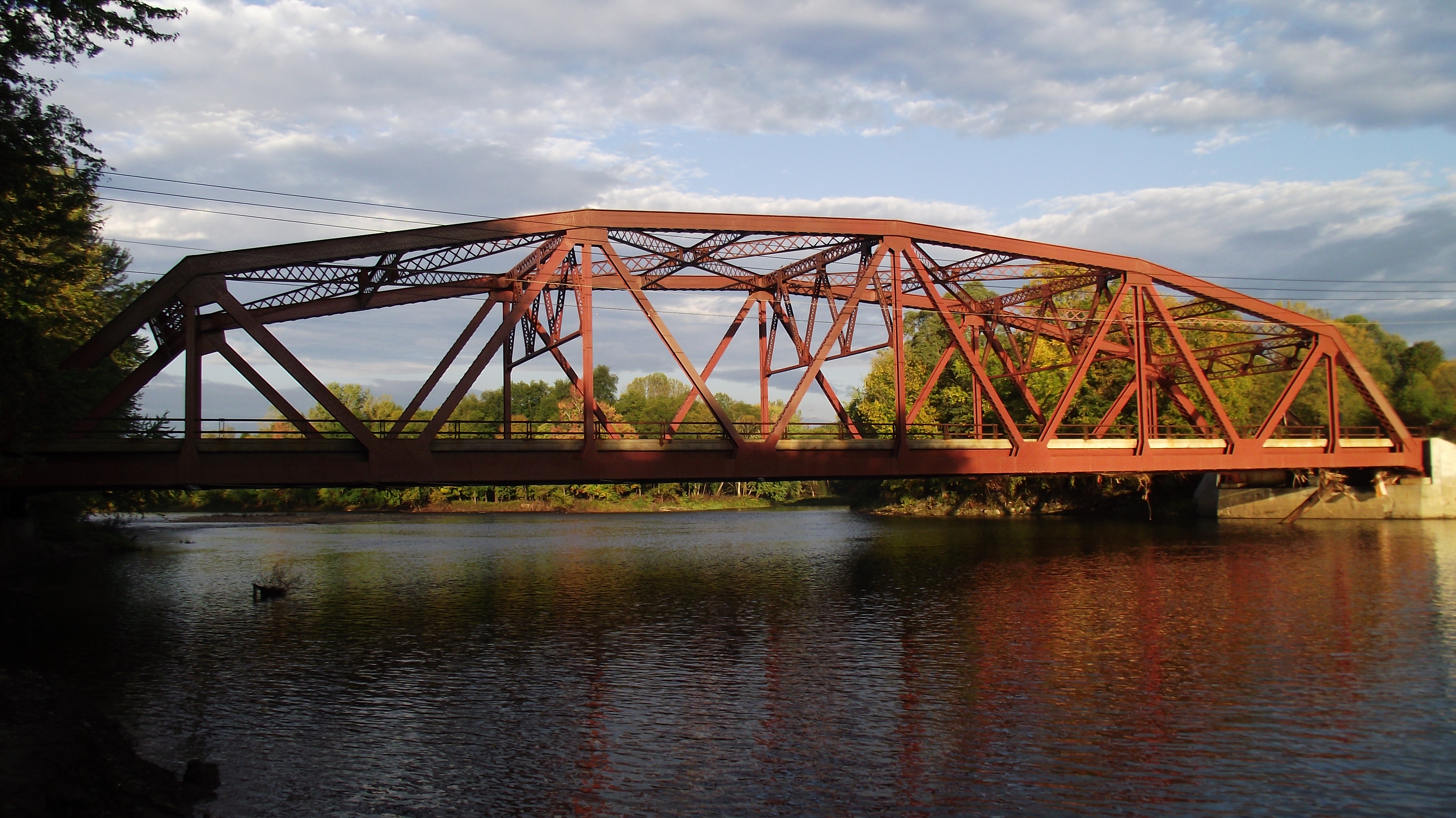
- Carpenter's Flats Bridge, September 2011

- Location within New York Location within the United States
- Location: US 9 over AuSable River, Au Sable, New York and Peru, New York
- Coordinates: 44°33′32″N 73°26′57″W
- Area: less than one acre
- Built: 1941
- Architect: American Bridge Company
- Architectural style: Warren Steel Truss
- MPS: AuSable River Valley Bridges MPS
- NRHP reference No.: 99001321
- Added to NRHP: November 12, 1999

Carpenter's Flats Bridge is a historic Warren Steel Truss bridge over the Ausable River at AuSable and Peru in Clinton County, New York. It was built by the American Bridge Company in 1941. The bridge is 255 feet (78 m) in length, 37 feet (11 m) wide, and 38 feet (12 m) in height.

It was listed on the National Register of Historic Places in 1999 for representing the distinctive American bridge designs of the late 19th and early 20th centuries and reflecting the development of American land-based transportation systems in an era of settlement.
