= Keeseville Historic District =

Historic district in New York, United States

- U.S. National Register of Historic Places
- U.S. Historic district
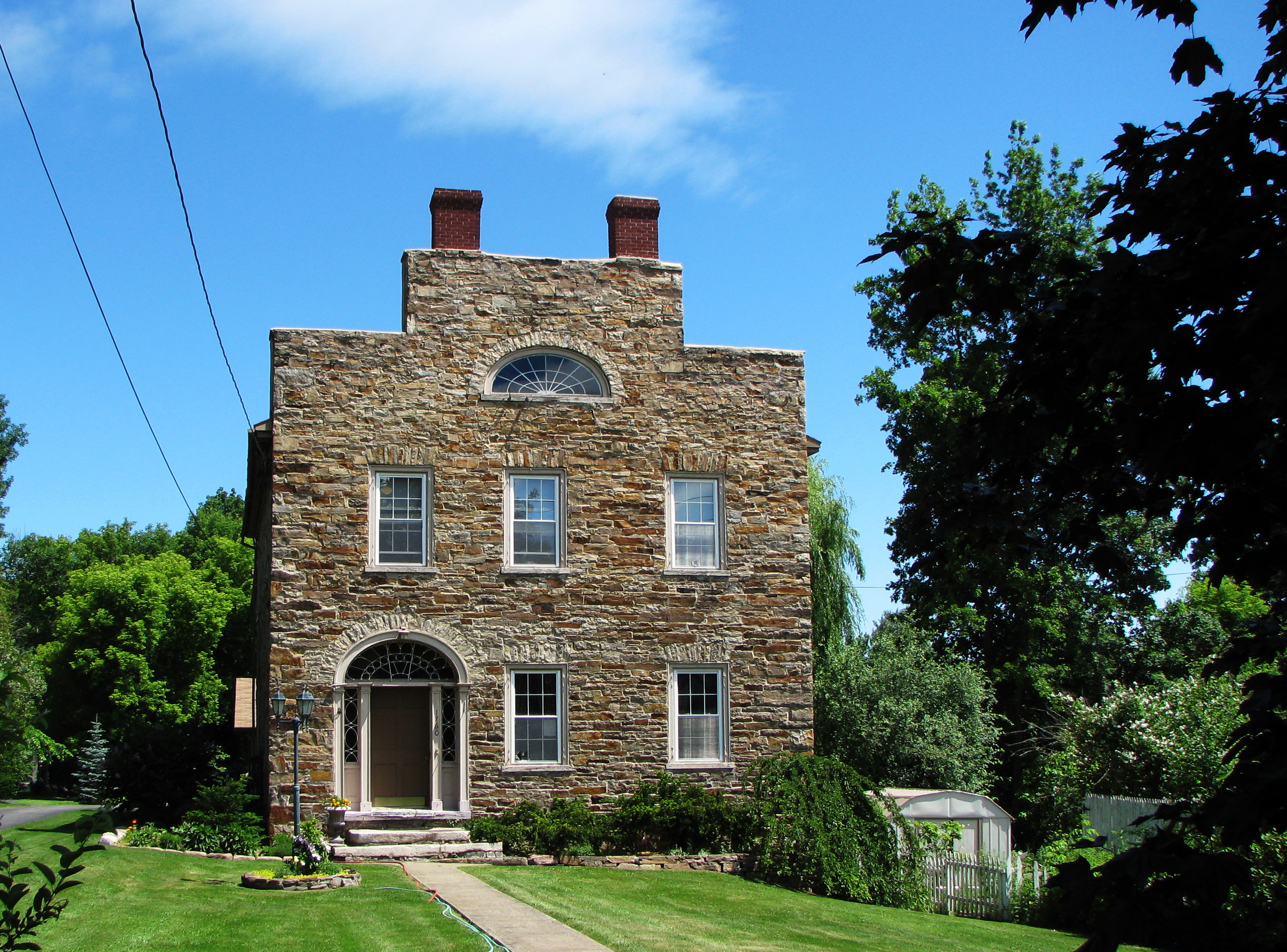
- The 1823 Richard Keese II house in Keeseville

- Location within New York Location within the United States
- Location: Roughly bounded by Vine, Chesterfield, Clinton, Hill, Pleasant, Front, and Beech Sts., Keeseville, New York
- Coordinates: 44°30′16″N 73°28′58″W
- Area: 76 acres (31 ha)
- Built: 1820
- Architectural style: Italianate, Gothic Revival, Classical Revival
- MPS: Keeseville Village MRA
- NRHP reference No.: 83001666
- Added to NRHP: May 20, 1983

The Keeseville Historic District is a historic district listed on the National Register of Historic Places containing 142 historic structures in Keeseville, in Essex and Clinton counties in New York, in the United States. The buildings, built between 1820 and 1936, are concentrated on the streets near the Ausable River, which runs through the center of the village.

The district contains well-preserved examples of industrial and commercial buildings, working-class houses, entrepreneurs' residences, and two historic bridges spanning the Ausable River which divides the village and is the border between Essex and Clinton counties. Keeseville's architectural heritage includes regional examples of Classical, Gothic Revival, and Italianate design, many designed and built by noted local craftsmen Seneca and Isaac Perry, along with more modest structures; many of the structures are built of local river sandstone. In its historic setting and in the quality and variety of its historic structures, the Keeseville Historic District typifies the Adirondack water-powered mill community of the period 1820–1890.

It was added to the National Register of Historic Places in 1983.
