= Stone Arch Bridge (Keeseville, New York) =

- U.S. National Register of Historic Places
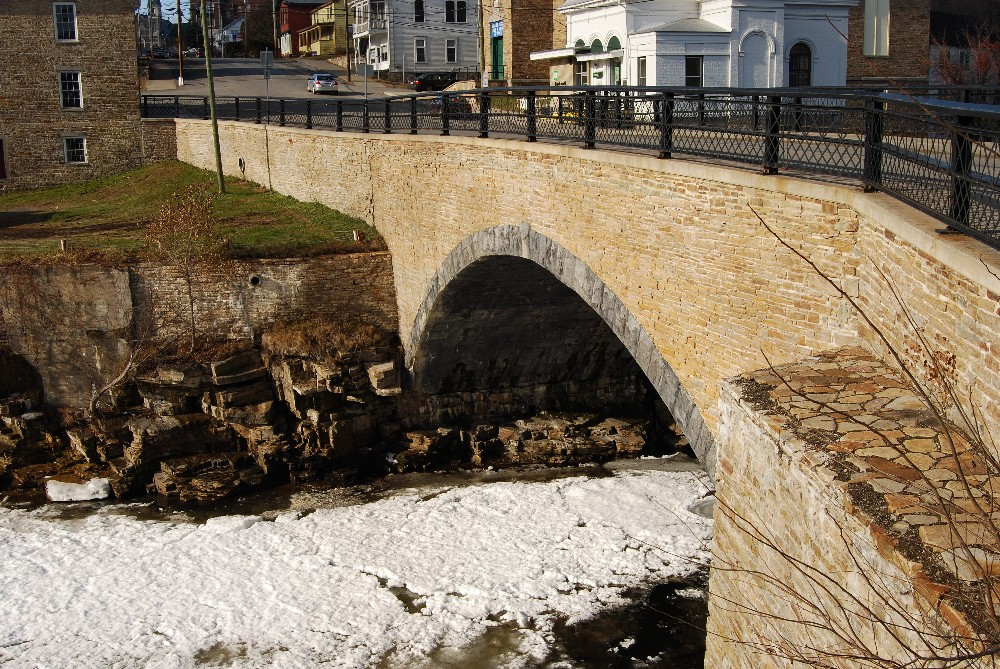
- Stone Arch Bridge, 2008

- Location within New York Location within the United States
- Location: Main Street over AuSable River, Keeseville, New York
- Coordinates: 44°30′19″N 73°28′52″W
- Area: less than one acre
- Built: 1843
- Architect: Townsend, Solomon
- Architectural style: Stone Arch
- MPS: AuSable River Valley Bridges MPS
- NRHP reference No.: 99001323
- Added to NRHP: November 12, 1999

Stone Arch Bridge is a historic stone arch bridge over the Ausable River at Keeseville in Clinton County and Essex County, New York. It was built in 1843.

It was listed on the National Register of Historic Places in 1999.
