= AuSable, New York =

- Town
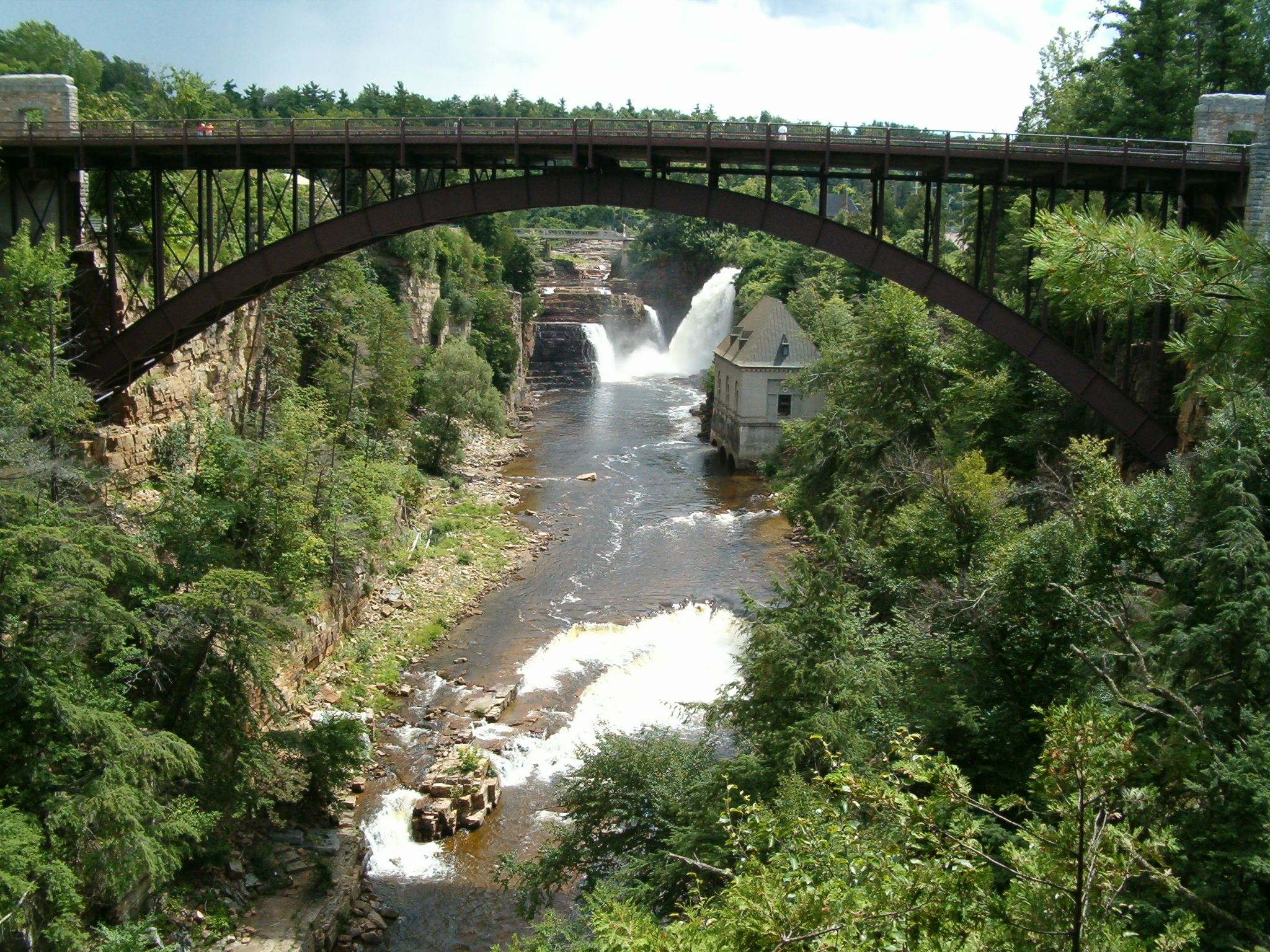
- The AuSable Chasm Bridge

- Location in Clinton County and the state of New York.
- Coordinates: 44°31′N 73°31′W
- Country: United States
- State: New York
- County: Clinton

Government
  - Type: Town Council
  - Town Supervisor: Sandy Senecal (D)
  - Town Council: Members' List: • Steven D. Sucharski (D); • Darcy D. Pray (R); • Jude Perkett (R); • Scot M. Zmijewski (R)

Area
  - Total: 43.85 sq mi (113.58 km^{2})
  - Land: 39.11 sq mi (101.30 km^{2})
  - Water: 4.74 sq mi (12.28 km^{2})
- Elevation: 778 ft (237 m)

Population (2010)
  - Total: 3,146
  - Estimate (2016): 3,082
  - Density: 78.8/sq mi (30.42/km^{2})
- Time zone: UTC-5 (Eastern (EST))
  - Summer (DST): UTC-4 (EDT)
- ZIP Codes: 12944 (Keeseville); 12911 (Ausable Chasm); 12924 (Clintonville); 12912 (Au Sable Forks); 12972 (Peru)
- FIPS code: 36-019-03221
- GNIS feature ID: 0978699
- Website: townofausableny.gov

AuSable, also Au Sable or Ausable (/ɒˈseɪbəl/ oss-AY-bəl), is a town in Clinton County, New York, United States. The population was 3,146 at the 2010 census. The name is from the Ausable River that flows through the town and means "of sand".

The town is in the southeastern corner of the county, south of Plattsburgh.

== History ==
The land was first settled c. 1795, mostly by people of English descent. The town was formed from part of the town of Peru in 1839.

The AuSable Chasm Bridge was built in 1932–1933.

== Geography ==
According to the United States Census Bureau, the town has a total area of 43.9 square miles (113.6 km^{2}), of which 39.1 square miles (101.3 km^{2}) is land and 4.7 square miles (12.3 km^{2}), or 10.81%, is water.

The town is bordered by Lake Champlain to the east. The southern town line is the border of Essex County.

Ausable Chasm, a popular tourist location on the Ausable River, is along the southeastern border of the town.

Interstate 87, the Adirondack Northway, is an important north–south highway in Au Sable, with access to the town from Exit 34 (Route 9N). U.S. Route 9 runs closer to Lake Champlain than the Northway. New York State Route 9N runs east–west along the south town line, joining US 9 in Keeseville. New York State Route 22 is a north–south highway mostly lying west of the Northway.

== Demographics ==
Historical population
Census	Pop.	Note	%±
1840	3,222		—
1850	4,492		39.4%
1860	3,227		−28.2%
1870	2,863		−11.3%
1880	2,980		4.1%
1890	2,532		−15.0%
1900	2,195		−13.3%
1910	2,045		−6.8%
1920	1,636		−20.0%
1930	1,868		14.2%
1940	1,985		6.3%
1950	1,903		−4.1%
1960	2,605		36.9%
1970	2,652		1.8%
1980	2,792		5.3%
1990	2,870		2.8%
2000	3,015		5.1%
2010	3,146		4.3%
2016 (est.)	3,082		−2.0%
U.S. Decennial Census

As of the census of 2000, there were 3,015 people, 1,180 households, and 831 families residing in the town. The population density was 77.1 inhabitants per square mile (29.8/km^{2}). There were 1,347 housing units at an average density of 34.4 per square mile (13.3/km^{2}). The racial makeup of the town was 97.78% White, 0.80% African American, 0.23% Native American, 0.30% Asian, 0.27% from other races, and 0.63% from two or more races. Hispanic or Latino of any race were 1.33% of the population.

There were 1,180 households, out of which 33.2% had children under the age of 18 living with them, 53.7% were married couples living together, 11.6% had a female householder with no husband present, and 29.5% were non-families. 23.6% of all households were made up of individuals, and 12.1% had someone living alone who was 65 years of age or older. The average household size was 2.53 and the average family size was 2.95.

In the town, the population was spread out, with 26.0% under the age of 18, 7.5% from 18 to 24, 29.1% from 25 to 44, 23.0% from 45 to 64, and 14.4% who were 65 years of age or older. The median age was 38 years. For every 100 females, there were 97.4 males. For every 100 females age 18 and over, there were 92.0 males.

The median income for a household in the town was $34,118, and the median income for a family was $39,906. Males had a median income of $30,213 versus $22,933 for females. The per capita income for the town was $15,789. About 7.7% of families and 12.0% of the population were below the poverty line, including 16.9% of those under age 18 and 14.7% of those age 65 or over.

== Communities and locations in Au Sable ==
- Au Sable Beach – A location on the shore of Lake Champlain at the mouth of the Au Sable River.
- Ausable Chasm – A deep gorge carved by the Au Sable River. It is a privately owned tourist attraction. The name is also used by a hamlet in the town next to the gorge.
- Ausable River – A river that flows along the town border to Lake Champlain.
- Birmingham Falls – A historic location near Keeseville.
- Clintonville – A hamlet near the southern town line on NY 9N. The community was incorporated as a village in 1825, but later abandoned that status.
- Harkness – A hamlet near the northern town line.
- Keese Corners – A location near the northern town line.
- Keeseville – The former village of Keeseville on US-9 at the southern town line. It extends south into the town of Chesterfield in Essex County.
- New Sweden – A historic location in the town.
- Rogers – A hamlet in the southwestern corner of the town on NY 9N.
- Thomasville – A location in the southwestern part of the town.
- Union – A historic location at the northern town line.
