= Swing Bridge (Keeseville, New York) =

- U.S. National Register of Historic Places
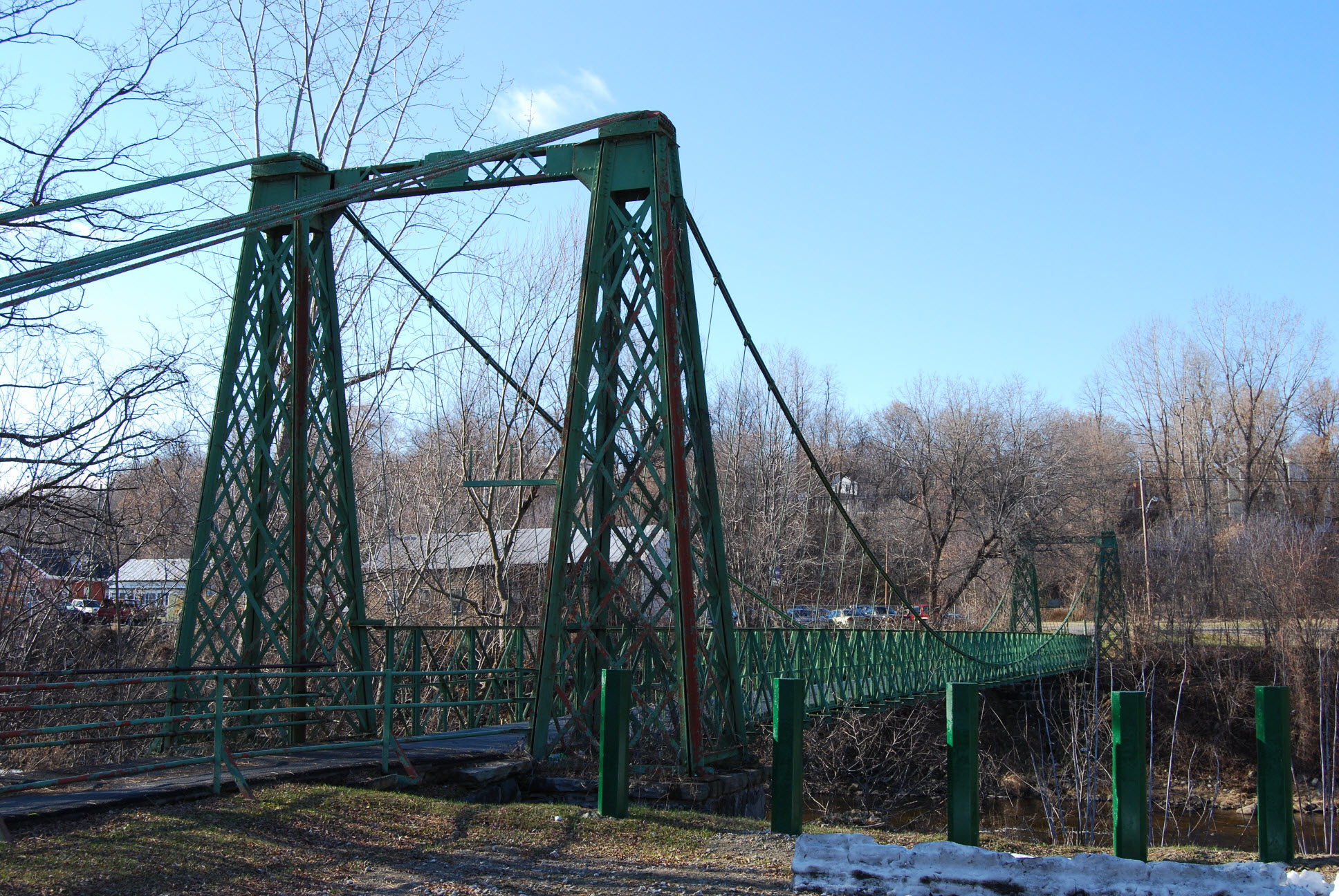

- Location within New York Location within the United States
- Location: Over AuSable River between Clinton and South AuSable Streets, Keeseville, New York
- Coordinates: 44°30′13″N 73°28′58″W
- Area: less than one acre
- Built: 1888
- Architect: Berlin Iron Bridge Company
- Architectural style: Pedestrian Suspension Bridge
- MPS: AuSable River Valley Bridges MPS
- NRHP reference No.: 99001322
- Added to NRHP: November 12, 1999

The Swing Bridge in Keeseville, New York over the Ausable River is not a swing bridge. It is a pedestrian suspension bridge that happens to swing, disconcertingly. It was designed and manufactured by the Berlin Iron Bridge Company in 1888 and it crosses from Clinton County, New York to Essex County, New York.

It was listed on the National Register of Historic Places in 1999.
