= AuSable Chasm Bridge =

- U.S. National Register of Historic Places
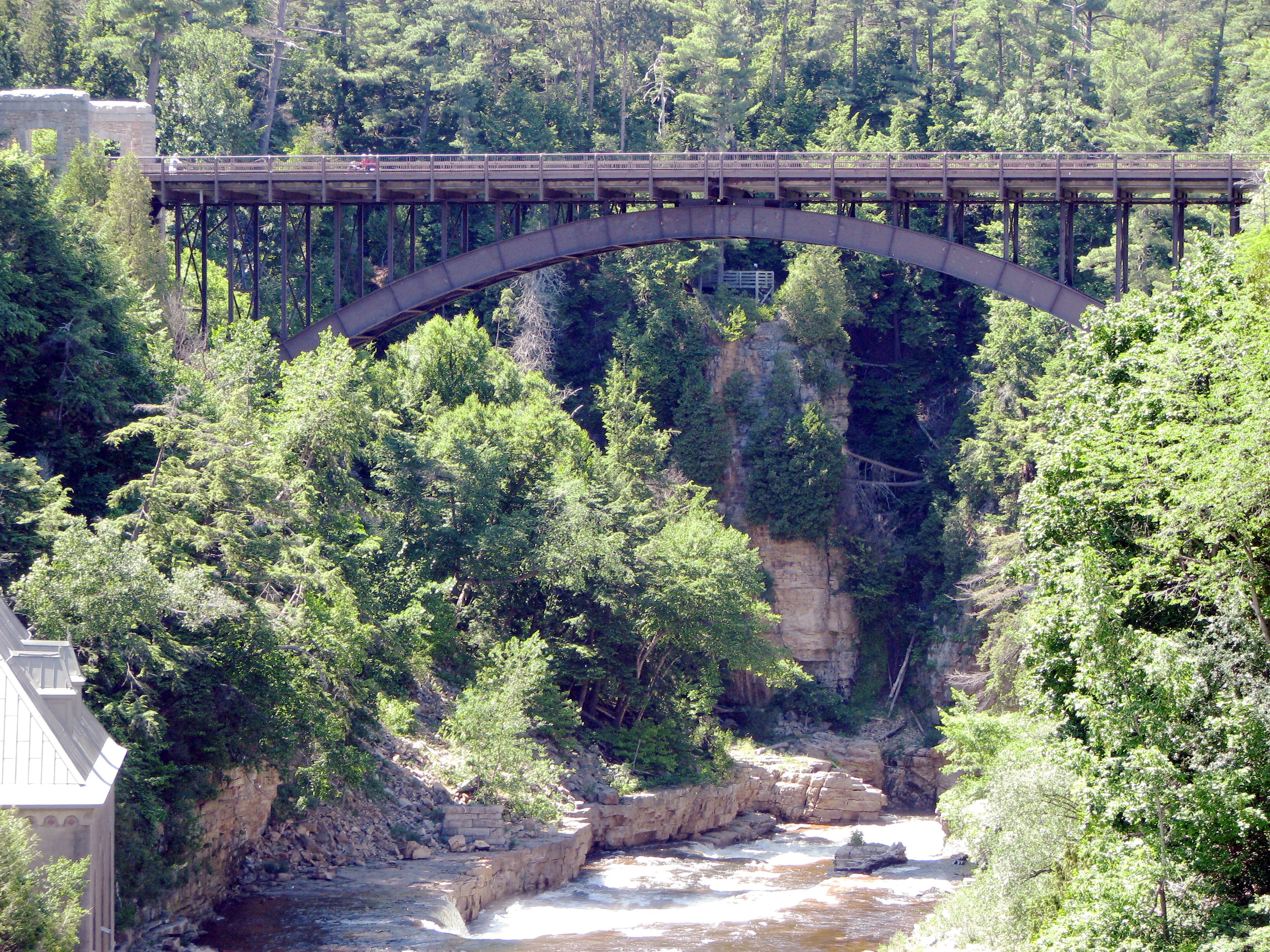
- Ausable Chasm Bridge

- Location within New York Location within the United States
- Location: US 9 over Ausable River., Au Sable, New York at Ausable Chasm
- Coordinates: 44°31′29″N 73°27′48″W
- Area: 2 acres (0.81 ha)
- Built: 1933
- Architect: MacCloskey, C.C., engineer, NYDPW; Stark, Burr M., builder
- Architectural style: Steel Arch
- MPS: AuSable River Valley Bridges MPS
- NRHP reference No.: 99001320
- Added to NRHP: November 12, 1999

AuSable Chasm Bridge is a historic steel arch bridge with concrete and stone faced approach spans that carries US 9 over the Ausable River at AuSable between Clinton and Essex Counties, New York. It was built between 1932 and 1933. The main span is 222 feet (68 m) in length, with two 52-foot (16 m) foot approach spans, for an overall length with approaches and abutments of 526 feet (160 m). It is approximately 40 feet (12 m) wide, with a span height of 45 feet (14 m) and overall height of 70 feet (21 m).

It was listed on the National Register of Historic Places in 1999.

== See also ==
- List of bridges on the National Register of Historic Places in New York
- National Register of Historic Places listings in Clinton County, New York
- National Register of Historic Places listings in Essex County, New York
