= Ventilation shutdown =

Method of killing large numbers of livestock via asphyxiation

Ventilation shutdown (VSD) is a means to kill livestock by suffocation and heat stroke in which airways to the building in which the livestock are kept are cut off. It is used for mass killing—usually to prevent the spread of diseases such as avian influenza. Animal rights organizations have called the practice unethical. The addition of carbon dioxide or additional heat to the enclosure is known as ventilation shutdown plus (VSD+).

== History ==
The term ventilation shutdown appears to have originated in 2006 from the United Kingdom Department for Environment, Food and Rural Affairs. The practice was first permitted in the UK on April 29, 2006. In the United States, approval to use ventilation shutdown was given in 2015.

In 2020, supply chain disruptions from the COVID-19 pandemic led to many meat plant closures and in turn backup in slaughtering. In response, millions of US farm animals were killed via mass depopulation methods with ventilation shutdown often being chosen.

The 2020–2023 H5N8 avian influenza outbreak led to millions of birds being killed via ventilation shutdown. In March 2022, one of the world's largest egg farms, Rembrandt Enterprises, used ventilation shutdown to kill 5.3 million chickens after the appearance of an avian influenza case.

In February 2026, the Modernizing Depopulation Act was introduced in the Colorado General Assembly. It aimed to phase out VSD and VSD+ as a mass killing method used for poultry disease control. On March 12, the bill was postponed indefinitely.

== Controversy ==
The practice of ventilation shutdown has been called cruel by many animal welfare and animal right groups such as the Humane Society of the United States. The process takes hours of high heat with one study putting the number between 1.5–3.75 hours for the egg industry. Environmental temperatures as high as 170 °F (77 °C) have been recorded in facilities where VSD has been used. In known recordings of the practice for pigs, sustained screaming and signs of distress were observed.

The widespread use of VSD is attributable by many, in part, due to the American Veterinary Medical Association (AVMA) publicly classifying ventilation shutdown's use as "acceptable under constrained circumstances". While unable to directly control if VSD is implemented, the AVMA's recommendations are often followed and used in determining legislation. Some people, such as the veterinarian Crystal Heath, have cited close ties between the meat industry and the AVMA as influencing their classification. There has been a campaign by organizations such the Veterinarians Against Ventilation Shutdown to get VSD reclassified as "not recommended" by the AVMA.

== See also ==
- Foam depopulation
- Culling
- Feedback – practice used by pork industry to attempt to mitigate present diseases
- Thumping
