= Tomlinson House =

Historic house in New York, United States

- U.S. National Register of Historic Places
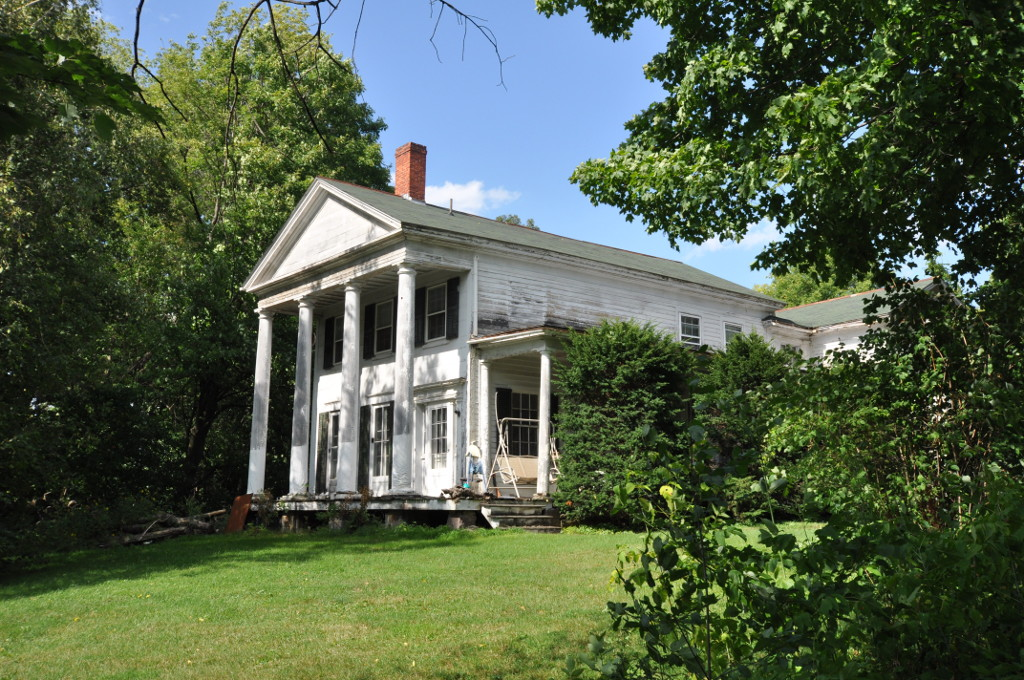

- Location within New York Location within the United States
- Location: Kent St., Keeseville, New York
- Coordinates: 44°30′10″N 73°28′41″W
- Area: 2 acres (0.81 ha)
- Built: 1846
- Architectural style: Federal
- MPS: Keeseville Village MRA
- NRHP reference No.: 83001678
- Added to NRHP: May 20, 1983

Tomlinson House is a historic home located at Keeseville in Essex County, New York. It was built in 1846 and is a two-story frame late-Federal style residence. It features a portico with four slender Doric order style columns supporting a plain frieze and pediment.

It was listed on the National Register of Historic Places in 1983.
