= Keeseville, New York =

- Hamlet and CDP
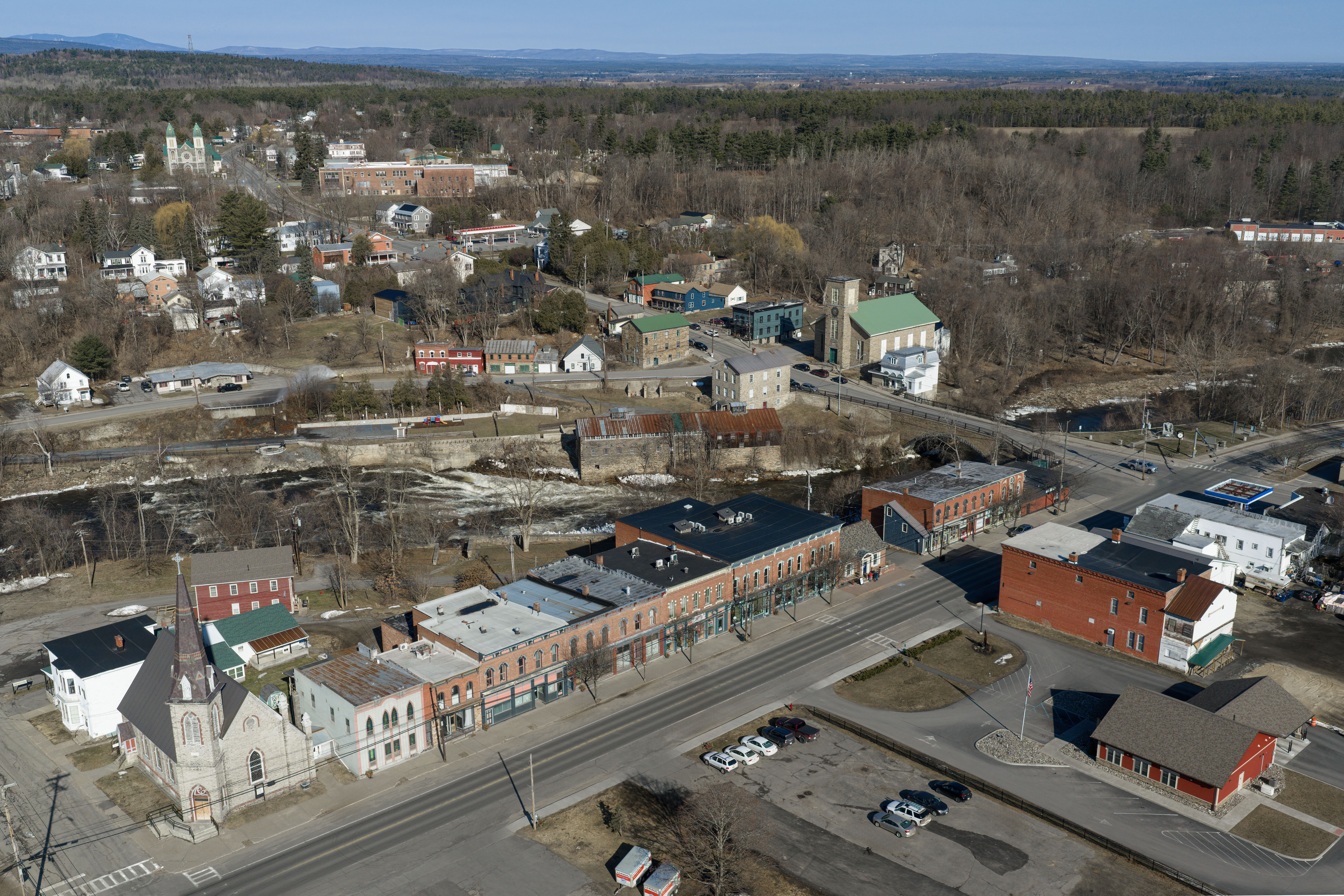
- Aerial view

- Location in Clinton County and the state of New York.
- Coordinates: 44°30′N 73°29′W
- Country: United States
- State: New York
- Counties: Clinton, Essex
- Towns: Au Sable and Chesterfield
- Incorporated: May 1878
- Dissolved: December 31, 2014

Area
  - Total: 6.13 sq mi (15.88 km^{2})
  - Land: 6.02 sq mi (15.59 km^{2})
  - Water: 0.11 sq mi (0.29 km^{2})
- Elevation: 417 ft (127 m)

Population (2020)
  - Total: 2,931
  - Density: 486.9/sq mi (187.98/km^{2})
- Time zone: UTC-5 (Eastern (EST))
  - Summer (DST): UTC-4 (EDT)
- ZIP Code: 12944
- Area code: 518
- FIPS code: 36-39089
- GNIS feature ID: 2390918
- Website: www.co.essex.ny.us/Keeseville.asp

Keeseville is a hamlet (and census-designated place) in Clinton and Essex counties, New York, United States. The population was 1,815 at the 2010 census. The hamlet was named after the Keese family, early settlers from Vermont. It developed along the Ausable River, which provided water power for mills and industrial development.

Keeseville is in the towns of Au Sable and Chesterfield and is south of the city of Plattsburgh. It is located inside what are now the boundaries of Adirondack Park, which was authorized in the 20th century.

On January 23, 2013, the town's select board voted to dissolve the village. As of 2016, the U.S. Census Bureau still had Keeseville listed as a village.

== History ==
Perspective map and list of landmarks from 1887 by L.R. Burleigh

The hamlet was originally called "Anderson Falls" by settlers from New England, who moved into the area following the American Revolutionary War and forcing of Iroquois tribes off their lands. The name was changed circa 1812 to "Keeseville", after a local manufacturer and businessman. The early hamlet was an industrial area devoted, in part, to lumber, iron processing and milling. One such industry was the Ausable Chasm Horse Nail Works, which produced two tons of nails a day from 1863 to 1925. There has also been a strong French Canadian influence, and many ethnic French have historic ties to the area. The Catholic cathedral, St. John's, was designed in a French style. As population moved west across New York and later to more urbanized areas, the village declined in population.

The Keeseville, Ausable Chasm & Lake Champlain Railroad connected Port Kent steamships and the Delaware & Hudson Railroad with the Chasm and local commerce from 1890 until 1924. The "Peanut RR" was a 5.6 mile shortline, of traditional American Standard Gauge width to allow easy transfer onto the rest of the U.S. rail network. The former train station, long North Country Club Restaurant, received a historic roadside marker on May 19, 2018. Visit Anderson Falls Heritage Society, 96 Clinton Street in Keeseville, to experience local history.

The Essex County Republican newspaper, founded in Port Henry, moved to Keeseville in the 20th century, becoming the Keeseville Essex County Republican.

In January 2013, voters decided in a referendum by a vote of 268–176 to dissolve the village. Their territory falls under the jurisdiction of the two towns in which it is located, which will provide services and government. The village officially dissolved on December 31, 2014.

The Double-Span Metal Pratt Truss Bridge, Keeseville Historic District, Rembrandt Hall, Stone Arch Bridge, Swing Bridge, and Tomlinson House are listed on the National Register of Historic Places.

== Geography ==
Keeseville is located at 44°30′13″N 73°28′52″W (44.503688, -73.481087), south of Plattsburgh, just west of Lake Champlain, within the Adirondack Park. The Ausable River, forming the boundary between Clinton and Essex counties, flows through the village. The northern half of the hamlet is within the Town of Au Sable in Clinton County, while the southern half is in the Town of Chesterfield in Essex County. north of the hamlet, the Ausable River forms a deep, 2 miles (3.2 km) long gorge, Ausable Chasm, which is also a popular tourist attraction.

According to the United States Census Bureau, the village has a total area of 1.2 square miles (3.2 km^{2}), of which 1.2 square miles (3.0 km^{2}) is land and 0.04 square miles (0.1 km^{2}), or 4.47%, is water.

Keeseville is at the junction of US Route 9, New York State Route 22 and New York State Route 9N, as well as Essex County Roads 15, 16, and 17. Interstate 87, the Northway, passes west of the village, with access from Exit 34 (NY 9N).

== Demographics ==
Historical population
Census	Pop.	Note	%±
1880	2,181		—
1890	2,103		−3.6%
1900	2,110		0.3%
1910	1,835		−13.0%
1920	1,524		−16.9%
1930	1,794		17.7%
1940	1,921		7.1%
1950	1,977		2.9%
1960	2,213		11.9%
1970	2,122		−4.1%
1980	2,025		−4.6%
1990	1,854		−8.4%
2000	1,850		−0.2%
2010	1,815		−1.9%
2020	2,931		61.5%
U.S. Decennial Census

As of the census of 2000, there were 1,850 people, 706 households, and 477 families residing in the hamlet. The population density was 1,584.4 inhabitants per square mile (611.7/km^{2}). There were 816 housing units at an average density of 698.8 per square mile (269.8/km^{2}). The racial makeup of the hamlet was 96.54% White, 0.92% African American, 0.38% Native American, 0.32% Asian, 0.70% from other races, and 1.14% from two or more races. Hispanic or Latino of any race were 1.35% of the population.

There were 706 households, out of which 34.4% had children under the age of 18 living with them, 48.7% were married couples living together, 13.6% had a female householder with no husband present, and 32.4% were non-families. 24.9% of all households were made up of individuals, and 11.0% had someone living alone who was 65 years of age or older. The average household size was 2.57 and the average family size was 3.04.

In the hamlet the population was spread out, with 27.1% under the age of 18, 8.5% from 18 to 24, 29.2% from 25 to 44, 22.4% from 45 to 64, and 12.8% who were 65 years of age or older. The median age was 36 years. For every 100 females, there were 94.7 males. For every 100 females age 18 and over, there were 90.9 males.

The median income for a household in the hamlet was $32,813, and the median income for a family was $36,181. Males had a median income of $28,229 versus $21,500 for females. The per capita income for the hamlet was $13,939. About 10.9% of families and 15.3% of the population were below the poverty line, including 21.5% of those under age 18 and 9.9% of those age 65 or over.

== Education ==
The census-designated place is in the AuSable Valley Central School District.

== Notable people ==
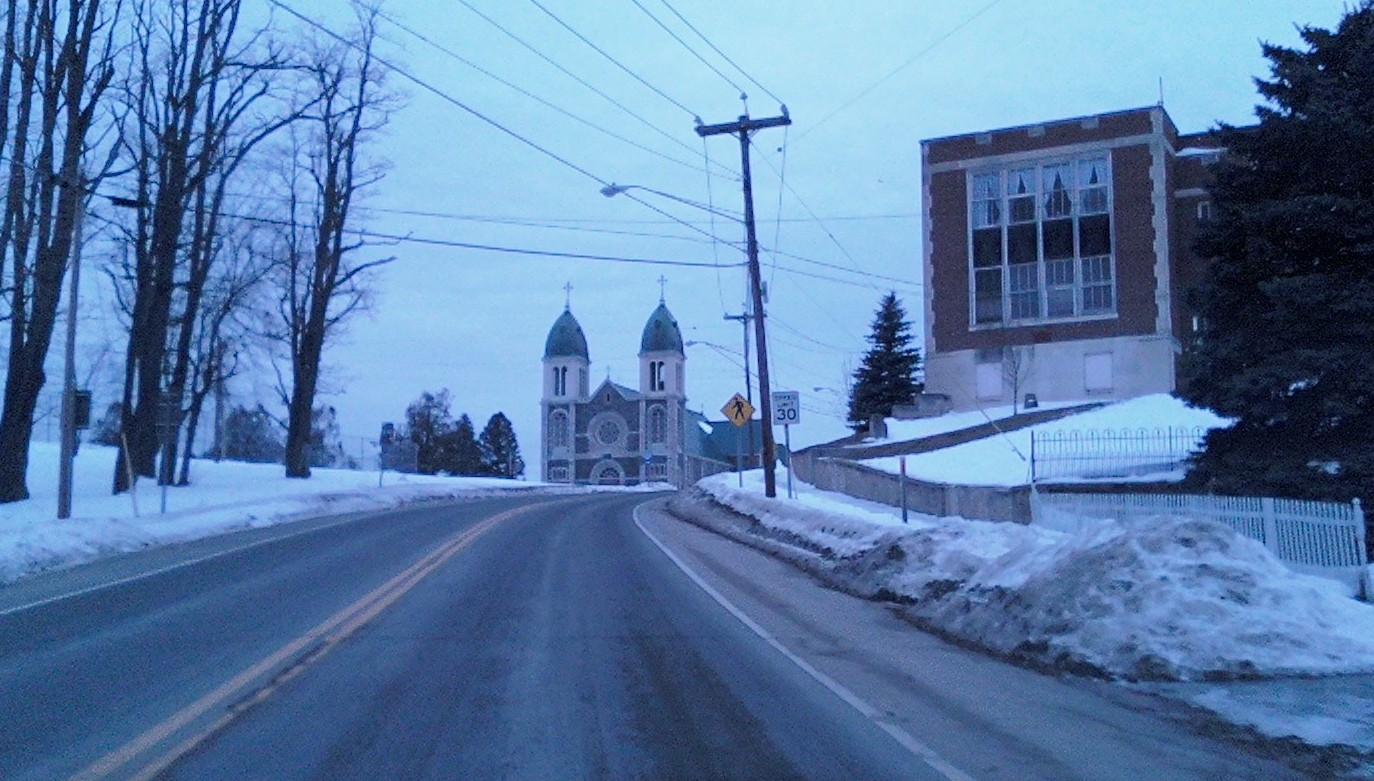
St. John's Catholic Church, designed in the French Gothic style

Keeseville is the birthplace of William Henry Jackson, born April 4, 1843, who became a renowned photographer of the frontier and the Civil War. He also was known as an accomplished American painter. It is also the birthplace of Julia H. Thayer (1847-1944), poet and educator.

Jackson was an explorer and photographer who accompanied various geologic surveys of the time. His photographs of the American frontier are famous, and his glass negatives are held in museums around the United States. Jackson joined the U.S. Army in 1862 and was present at the Battle of Gettysburg.

Architect Isaac G. Perry also lived in Keeseville. He was active in upstate New York, designing churches and public buildings in the late 19th century that have been listed on the National Register of Historic Places.

== See also ==
- Bridges of Keeseville
