= Ausable Chasm =

Sandstone gorge near Keeseville, NY, USA

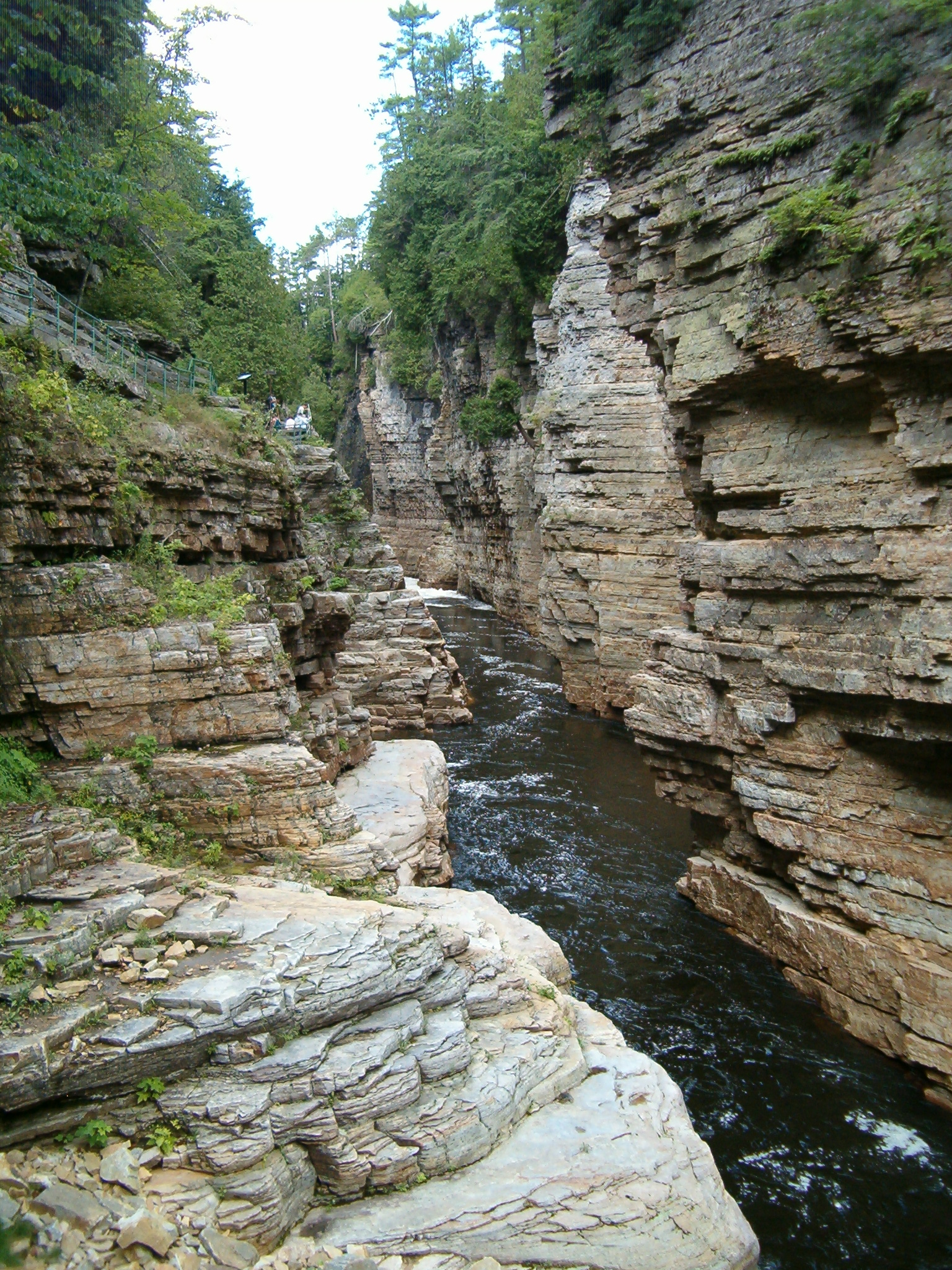
- Ausable Chasm

- Location within New York Location within the United States
- Length: 2 miles (3.2 km)
- Depth: 150 feet (46 m)

Geology
- Age: 10,000 years old

Geography
- Location: Keeseville, New York
- Country: United States
- Coordinates: 44°31′45″N 73°27′40″W
- Rivers: Ausable River
- Interactive map of Ausable Chasm

Ausable Chasm is a sandstone gorge and tourist attraction located near the hamlet of Keeseville, New York, United States, due west of Port Kent. The gorge is about two miles (3.2 km) long and is about 150 feet (46 m) deep.

Ausable Chasm is the namesake of the Ausable River, which runs through the gorge and empties into Lake Champlain about one mile (1.6 km) away. The gorge started forming about 10,000 years ago through headward erosion caused by Rainbow Falls, a 91 feet (28 m) waterfall at the gorge's southern extreme. The gorge is a major tourist attraction and landmark in the Adirondacks region of Upstate New York.

== Geology ==
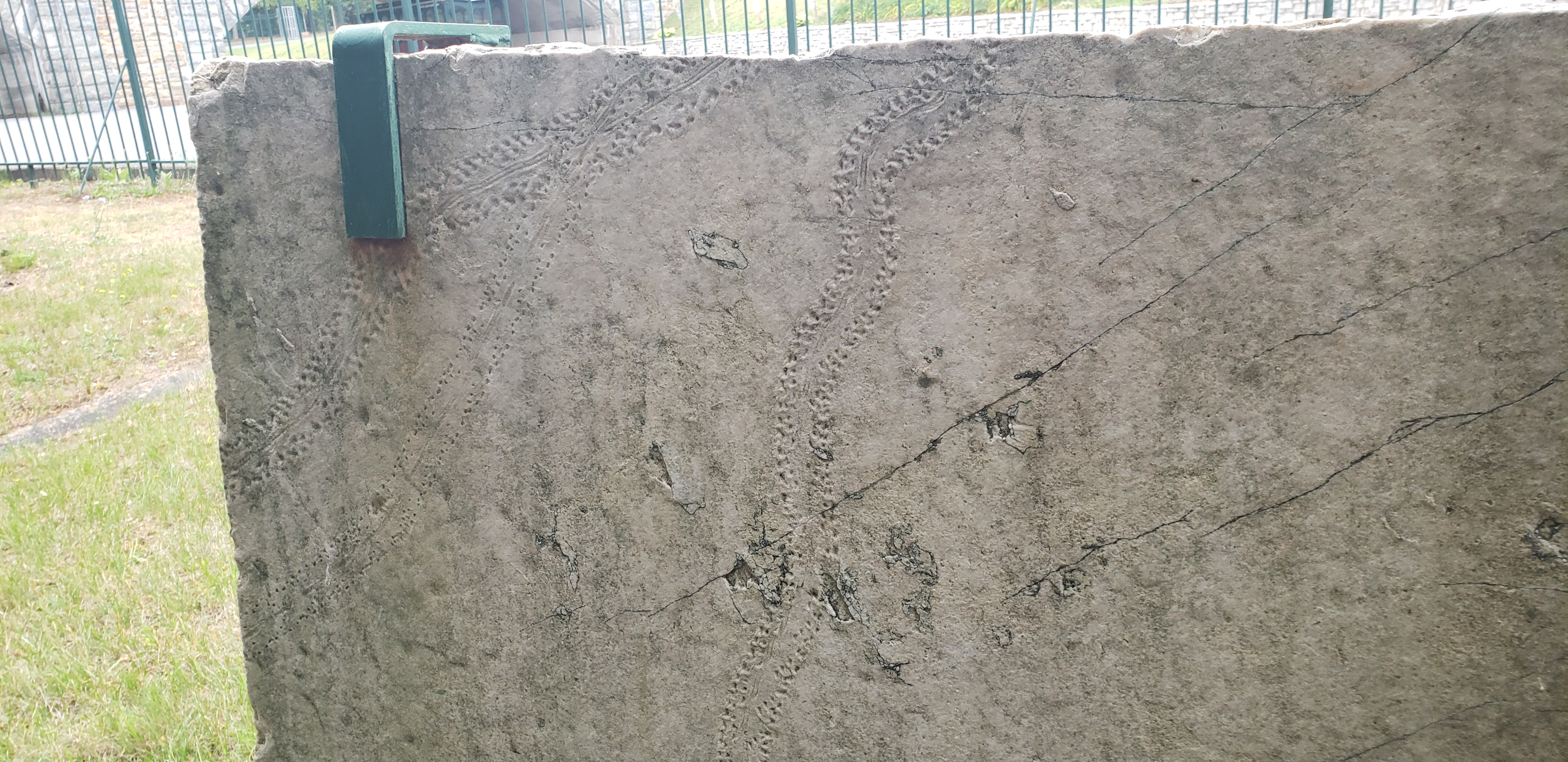
Protichnites trace fossils found at Ausable Chasm.

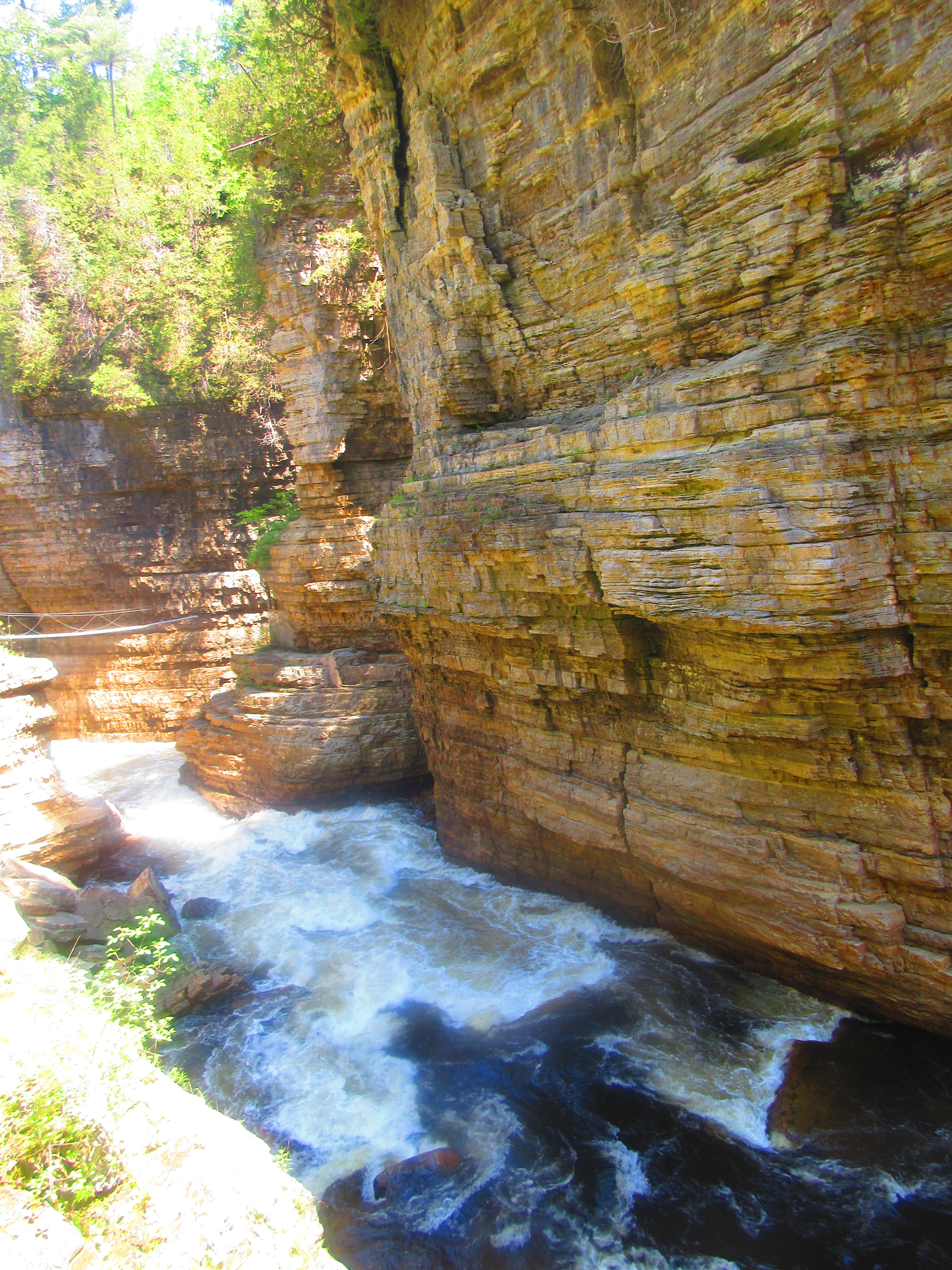
Rapids in the gorge.

Ausable Chasm is carved out of a 500-million-year-old, 520-foot (160 m)-thick exposure of Cambrian Potsdam Sandstone. The sandstone of the gorge, formed from ancient tidal flats, preserves ripple marks, ichnofossils, and rare mid-Cambrian Scyphomedusae jellyfish fossils.

Ausable Chasm itself is a result of the conclusion of the last glacial period at the end of the Pleistocene, about 10,000 years ago. Prior to the formation of the gorge, the movement of the Laurentide ice sheet during the last glacial period carved deep cliffs along the Champlain Valley, which were subsequently covered in glacial till. By the end of the last glacial period, the melting ice sheets formed the vast Champlain Sea, which inundated the current location of the chasm.

The formation of Ausable Chasm began in its earnest when post-glacial rebound caused the Champlain Sea to recede, and the Ausable River, with considerably higher flow than today due to glacial meltwater, began downcutting through the layers of glacial till. Once the incipient Ausable Chasm had fully cut through the unconsolidated glacial till and reached the Potsdam Sandstone basement, the river fell over a buried scarp and formed the ancestral Rainbow Falls. As the falls receded due to headward erosion, the river exploited vertical joints in the sandstone, resulting in the river following a sharp, angular course. Other than the natural weakness of the vertical joints, the horizontal beds of Potsdam Sandstone are resistant to erosion, contributing to the gorge's depth and narrowness. Over the next 10,000 years, the Ausable River in some places changed courses and left relict paleochannels, with two, the Big Dry Chasm and Little Dry Chasm, being open to visitors along with the main gorge.

Ausable Chasm today is a box canyon, with the Rainbow Falls having carved a two miles (3.2 km) long gorge from its ancestral location to the present-day visitor center. Modern development of the gorge has effectively been halted due to the construction of a dam upstream and the diversion of water from Rainbow Falls. Some formations that have been given names include Jacob's Well, a large pothole; the Cathedral; the Devil's Oven, a cave formed by the Ausable River; Elephant's Head; the Flume; Sentinel Rock; and Table Rock.

== History ==
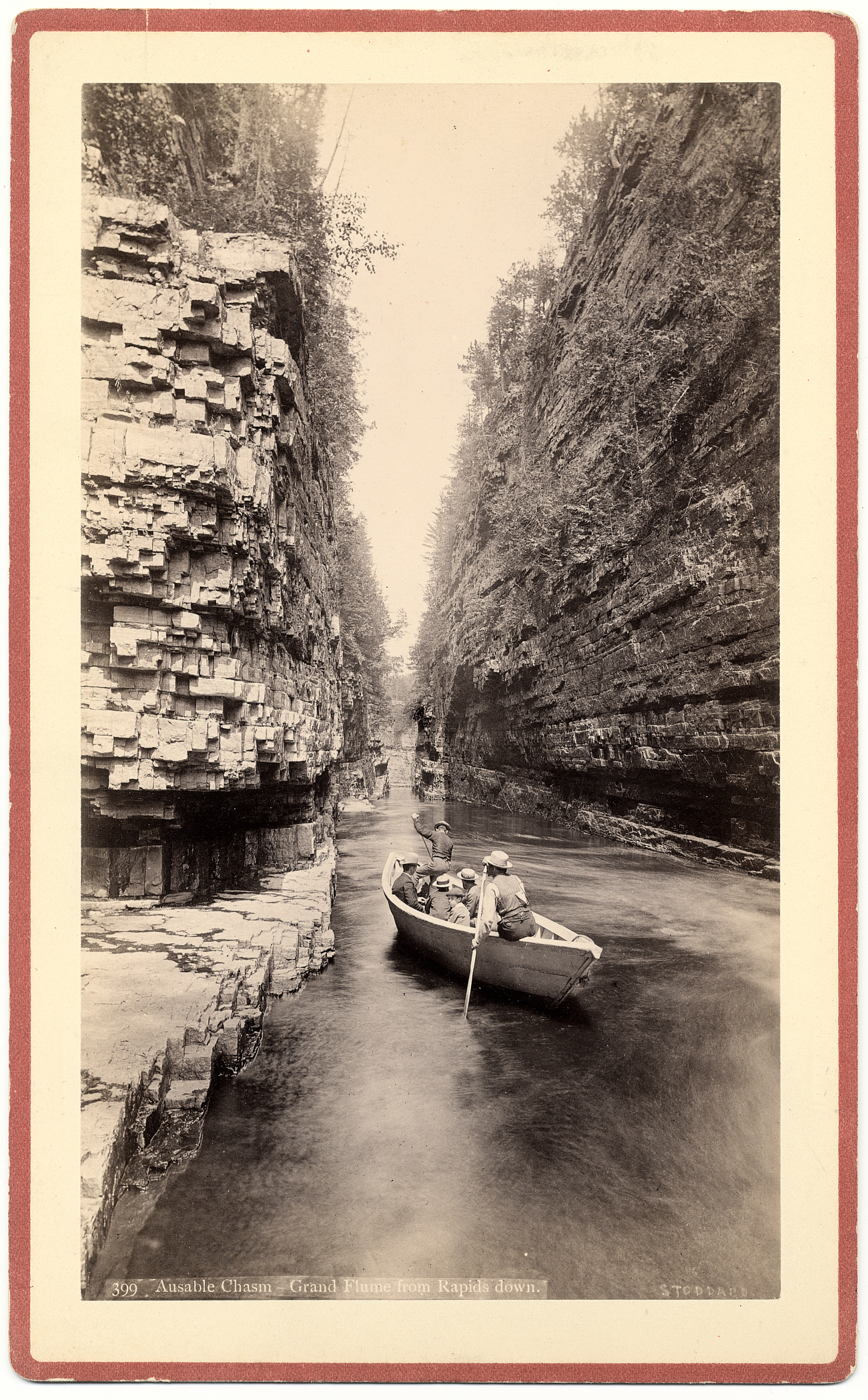
c.1875 photograph of the chasm by Seneca Ray Stoddard

Archeological evidence for Native American settlement has been found close to Ausable Chasm at Hallock Hill. In the 17th century, the land surrounding Ausable Chasm was contested between Mohawk people of the Iroquois Confederacy and Algonquian tribes. Native Americans left the area around 1810.

In 1760, Major John Howe explored the chasm on ropes. Five years later in 1765, early Irish settler William Gilliland encountered the chasm while exploring the shore of Lake Champlain on a bateau. Gilliland wrote in his journal that the gorge "is a most admirable sight, appearing on each side like a regular built wall, somewhat ruinated, and one would think that this prodigious clift was occasioned by an earthquake, their height on each side is from 40 to 100 feet in the different places; we saw about a half a mile of it, and by its appearance where we stopped it may continue very many miles further."

Although Gilliland's settlement was destroyed during the American Revolutionary War, the growth of the logging industry spurred the settlement of the area around the gorge, creating the village of Keeseville.The first bridge across the chasm, consisting of two logs planked with boards, was inaugurated in 1793. In the late 19th century, the chasm's Rainbow Falls was used to power Ausable Chasm Horse Nail Works, which produced two tons of nails a day. The factory closed in the 1925. In 1925, the AuSable Chasm Bridge was inaugurated, spanning the chasm at its southern extreme carrying US 9 over the Ausable River.

== Tourism ==
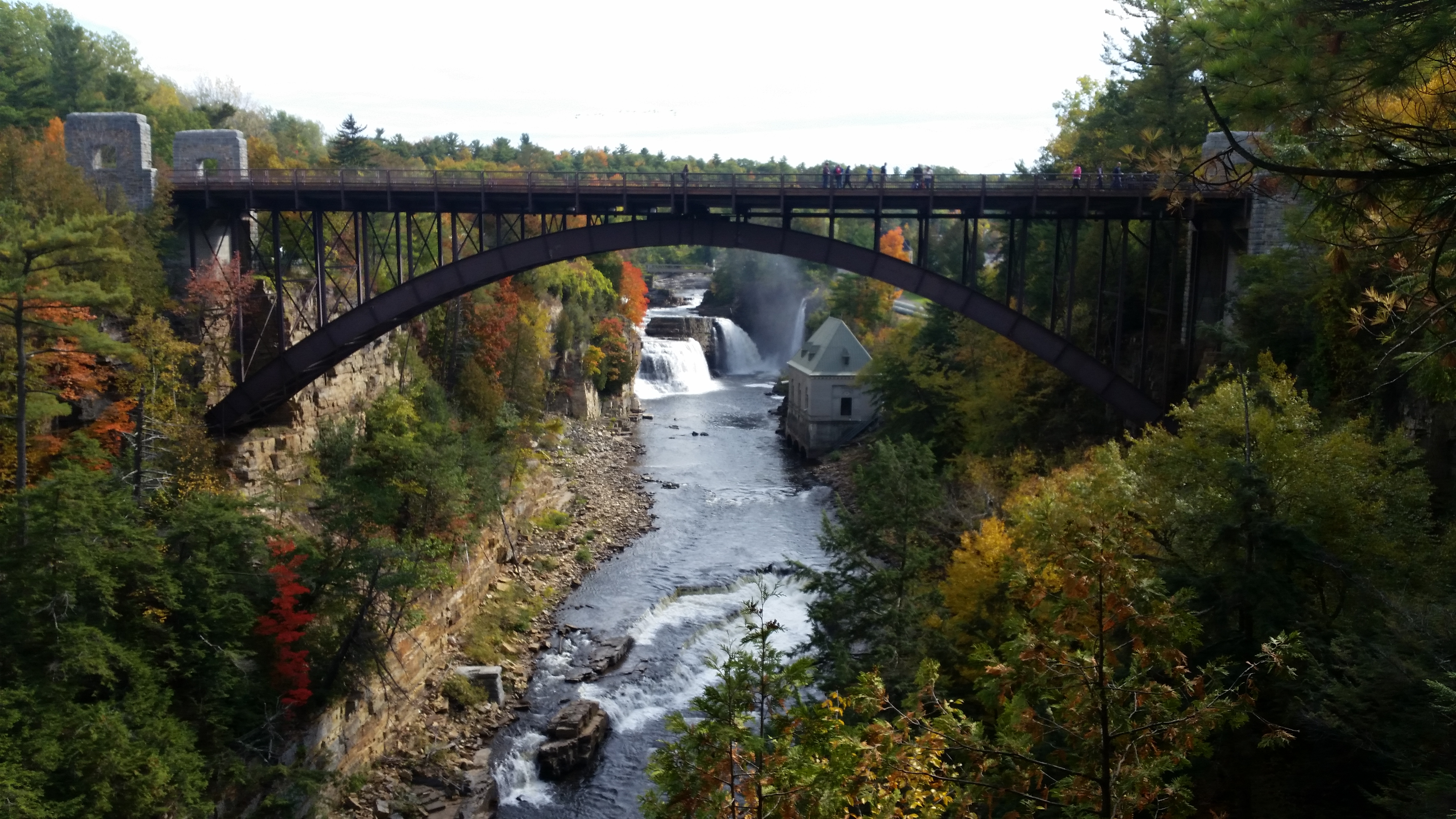
AuSable Chasm Bridge and Rainbow Falls

Formal tourism at the chasm began in 1873 with the formation of the Ausable Company by a group of Philadelphia businessmen. Tours of the chasm were offered by bateau for 25¢, and wooden walkways were constructed. In the following decades, the chasm was visited by Thomas Edison, John D. Rockefeller, Harvey Firestone, and Franklin and Eleanor Roosevelt. In 1897, sitting president William McKinley visited the chasm and rode the rapids on the Ausable River. Later, silent movies including Three Jumps Ahead filmed at the chasm, sometimes using it as a dramatic backdrop for stunts. A 120-room hotel, the Hotel AuSable Chasm, was built in 1890 to facilitate tourism, but burned down in 1950.

In January and November 1996, the chasm was hit by two devastating floods. The first, on January 19th, was caused by the rapid snowmelt in the Adirondack Mountains due to unseasonably warm temperatures. Although the tourist infrastructure around the chasm was devastated, it was rebuilt and substantially strengthened. Nevertheless, on November 9th, seven inches of rainfall resulted in a 100-year flood, which ripped apart the newly strengthened infrastructure. After the second flood, most of the tourist trails in the chasm were rerouted to higher ground.

The chasm, advertised as the "Grand Canyon of the Adirondacks", is presently operated as a tourist attraction which can be toured after a fee. In addition to five miles of trails which extend around and inside the chasm, activities offered include rock climbing, whitewater rafting and a via ferrata.

== Cultural attractions ==
- North Star Underground Railroad Museum, commemorating the Underground Railroad and operated by the North Country Underground Railroad Historical Association, is on Mace Chasm Road in Ausable Chasm, New York on County Route 71, south of the junction of County Route 373 and U.S. 9.

== Gallery ==
Pictures from 1907 postcards

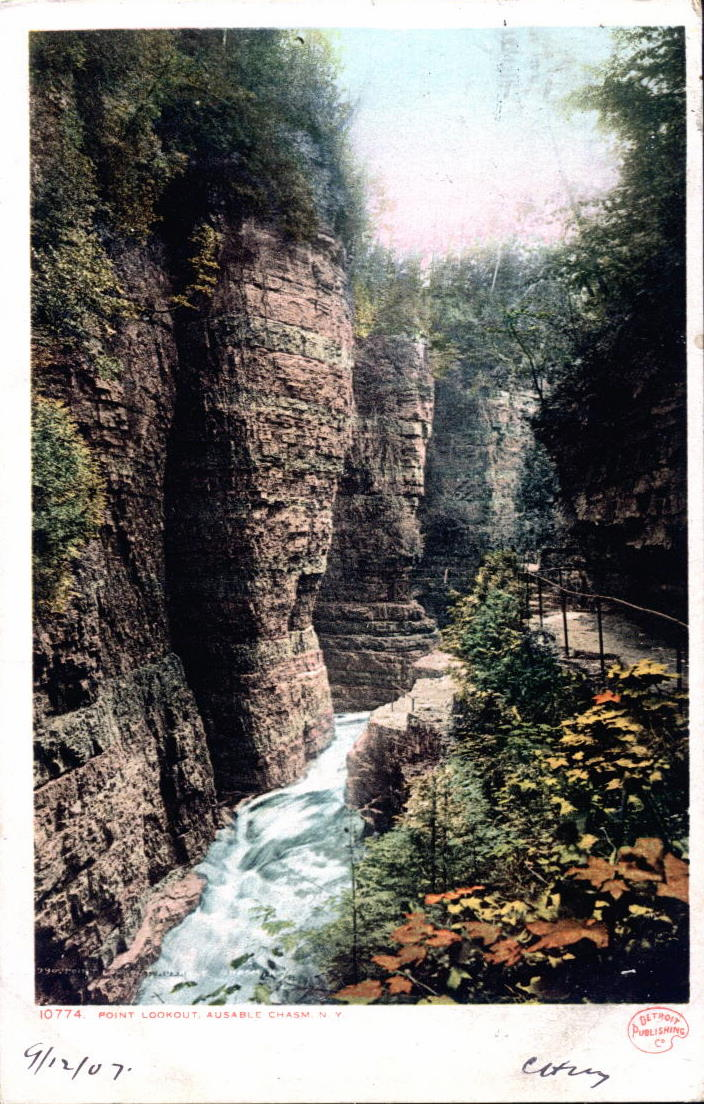
Lookout Point

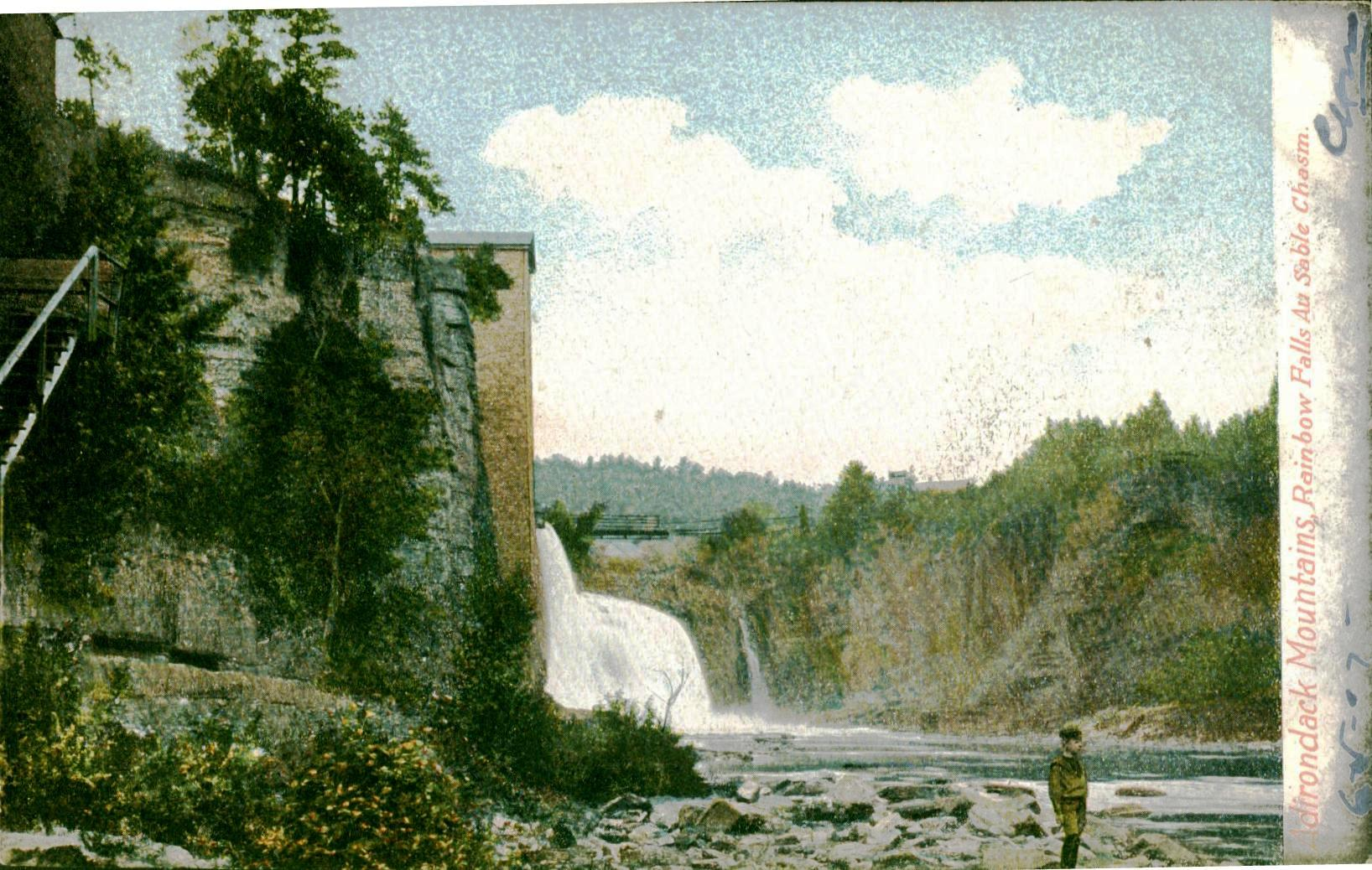
Rainbow Falls

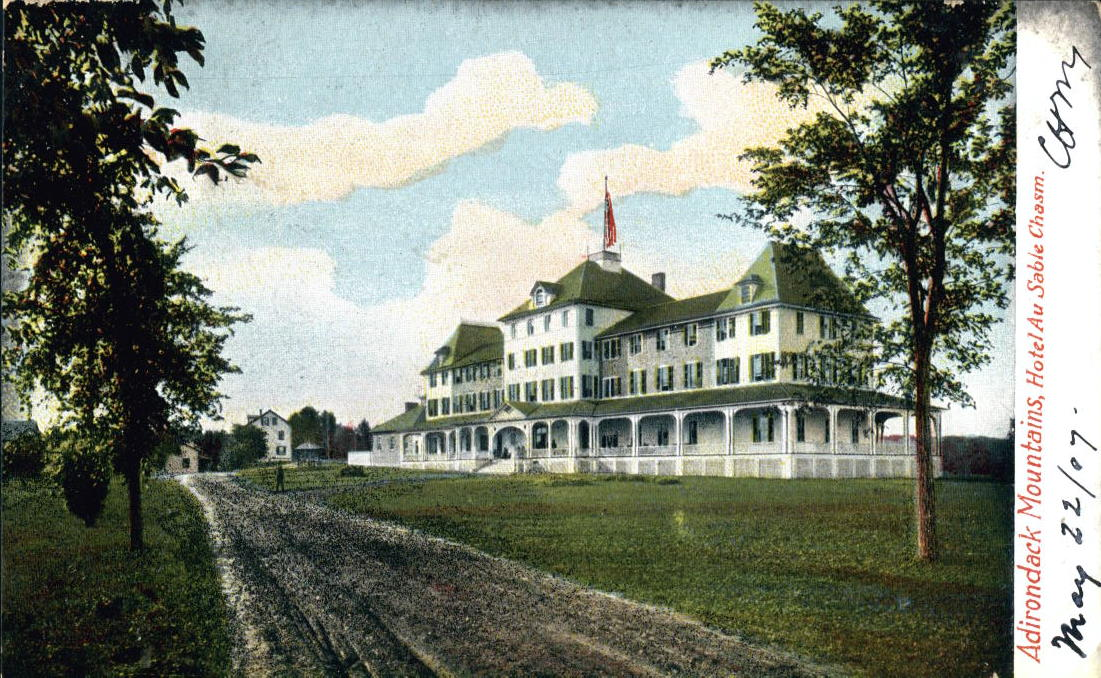
Hotel Ausable Chasm
