= Double-Span Metal Pratt Truss Bridge =

- U.S. National Register of Historic Places
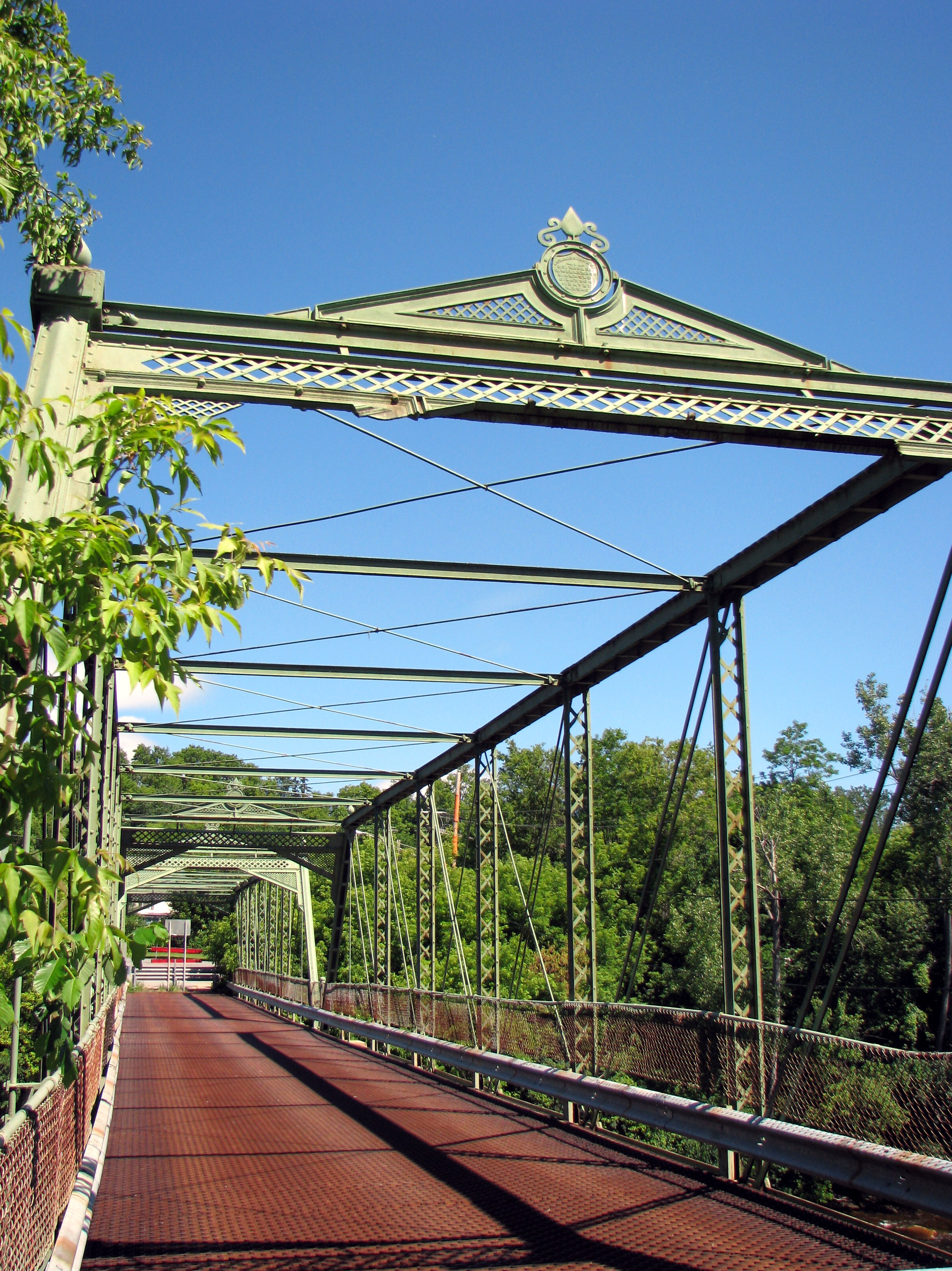
- Double-Span Metal Pratt Truss Bridge, June 2009

- Location within New York Location within the United States
- Location: AuSable Street, Keeseville, New York
- Coordinates: 44°30′1″N 73°29′7″W
- Area: less than one acre
- Built: 1877
- Architect: Law, William H.; Murray Dougal & Company
- Architectural style: Truss Bridge
- MPS: Keeseville Village MRA
- NRHP reference No.: 83001665
- Added to NRHP: May 20, 1983

Double-Span Metal Pratt Truss Bridge is a historic Pratt truss bridge over the Ausable River at Keeseville in Clinton County and Essex County, New York. It was built in 1877 by the Murray Dougal & Company of Milton, Pennsylvania. It is 214 feet in length and 16 feet wide. It consists of two 107 foot spans supported by a pier at mid-stream. It is the oldest extant example of a metal Pratt truss bridge in New York State.

The bridge carries Liberty Street over the Ausable River between Ausable Street and River River. It was listed on the National Register of Historic Places in 1999. In 2008 it was closed, and was in anticipation of repairs.
