= Rembrandt Enterprises =

Rembrandt Enterprises (REI) is an American company headquartered in Spirit Lake, Iowa. The company was founded in 2000 and is named after its egg operation in Rembrandt, Iowa. The company runs one of the world's largest egg producing and processing facilities. The company has faced criticism for their treatment of hens generally along with the usage of ventilation shutdown and treatment of workers following the appearance of avian influenza in March 2022.

== History ==
In the late 1990s, Darrel and his son David Rettig were attempting to construct a highly autonomous egg laying facility. With the financial backing of Glen Taylor, REI was founded.

In June 2015, the company killed all of their 5.5 to 5.6 million chickens using carbon dioxide and foam after a detected case of avian influenza. This represented a toll of around 25% of Iowa's population of hens and 5% of the entire United States.

In March 2022, the company came under criticism following their actions after a new appearance of avian influenza case. Following the detection, ventilation shutdown was employed to kill 5.3 million chickens. This method has been criticized by many animal welfare and animal rights groups as inhumane due to prolonged kill times and pain from suffocation. Additional pushback came from the treatment of their employees during this process. Workers ran 12-14 hour shifts doing ventilation shutdown and once complete, over 200 workers were fired, representing nearly all their employees at the time.
