= Rembrandt Hall =

Historic house in New York, United States

- U.S. National Register of Historic Places
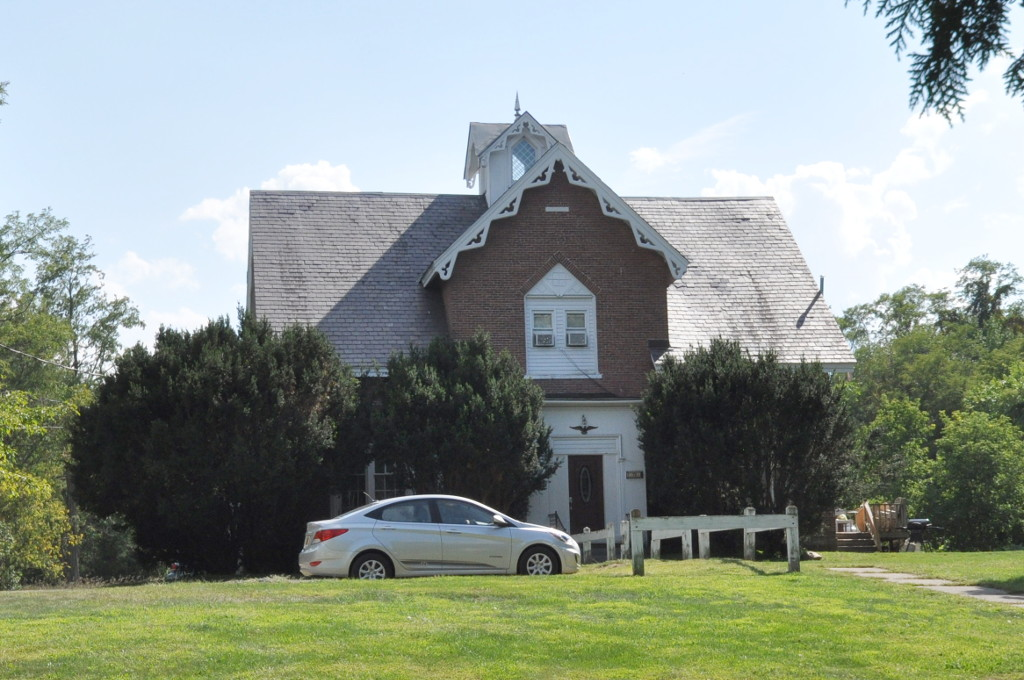

- Location within New York Location within the United States
- Location: Clinton St., Keeseville, New York
- Coordinates: 44°30′7″N 73°28′39″W
- Area: 2.6 acres (1.1 ha)
- Built: 1851
- Architect: Perry, Isaac
- Architectural style: Gothic Revival
- MPS: Keeseville Village MRA
- NRHP reference No.: 83001677
- Added to NRHP: May 20, 1983

Rembrandt Hall is a historic home located at Keeseville in Essex County, New York. It was built in 1851 and is a 1 1/2-story brick Gothic Revival style cottage. It consists of a central 2-story entrance pavilion flanked by identical bay windows. The interior features a noted rounded central staircase. It was designed by architect Isaac G. Perry for Emma Clara Peale Barton, wife of Caleb D. Barton and daughter of artist Rembrandt Peale.

It was listed on the National Register of Historic Places in 1983.
