= Ausable River (New York) =

U.S. river

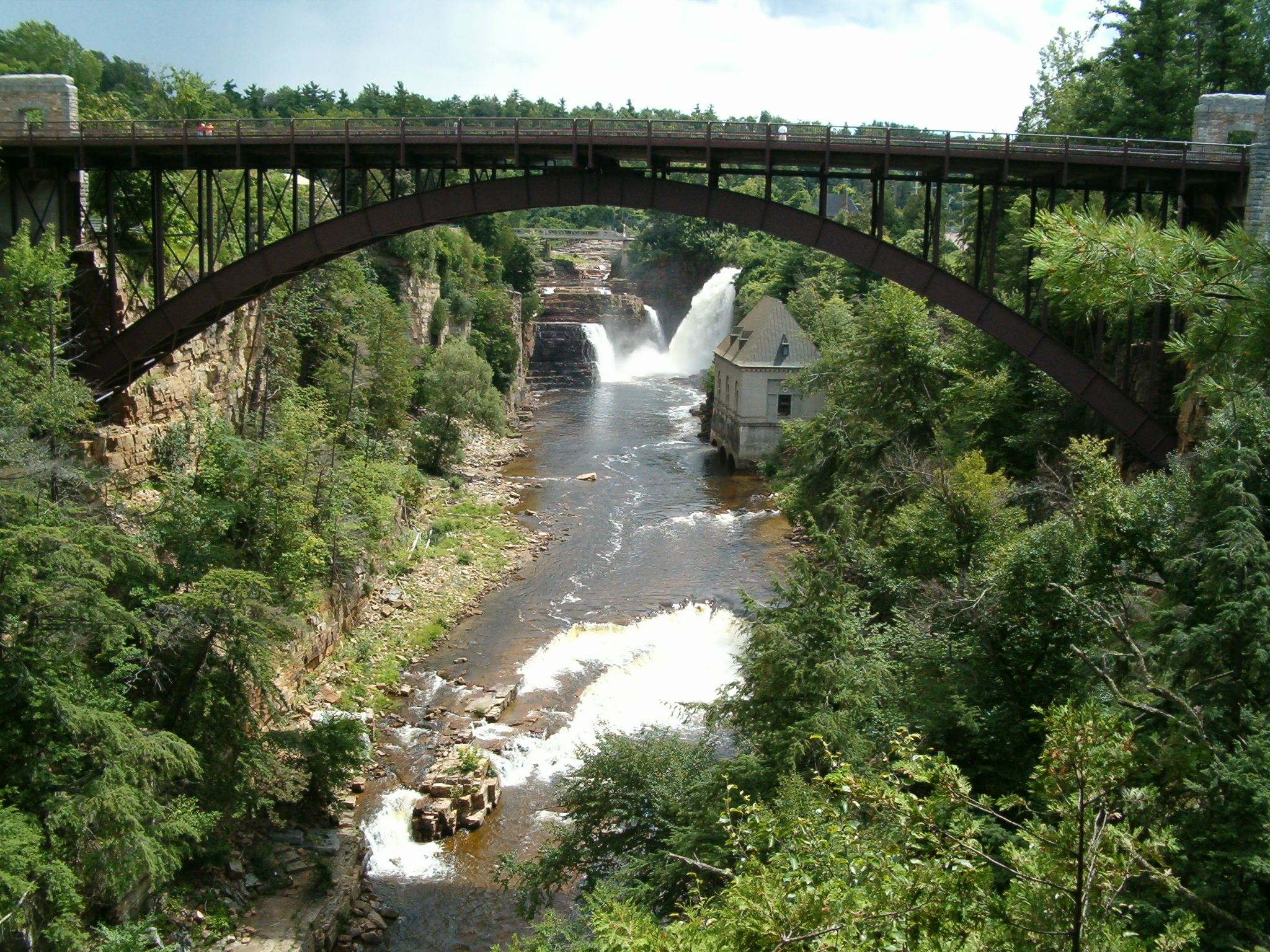
The Ausable River

The Ausable River (/ɔːˈseɪbəl/), also known as AuSable River and originally written as "Au Sable", runs in the U.S. state of New York, from the Adirondack Mountains and past the village of Lake Placid and Au Sable Forks to empty into Lake Champlain (at 44°33′40″N 73°25′25″W). It has an East and West branch that join at Au Sable Forks. The river forms a partial boundary between Clinton County and Essex County. The Ausable River is known for its gorge, Ausable Chasm, located a few miles east of Keeseville.

The Ausable River is 94 miles (150 km) long and drains a watershed of 516 square miles (1,340 km^{2}).

It was originally named "Au Sable" (French for "sandy") by Samuel de Champlain when he first explored the region in 1609 because of its extensive sandy delta.

== West Branch Ausable River ==
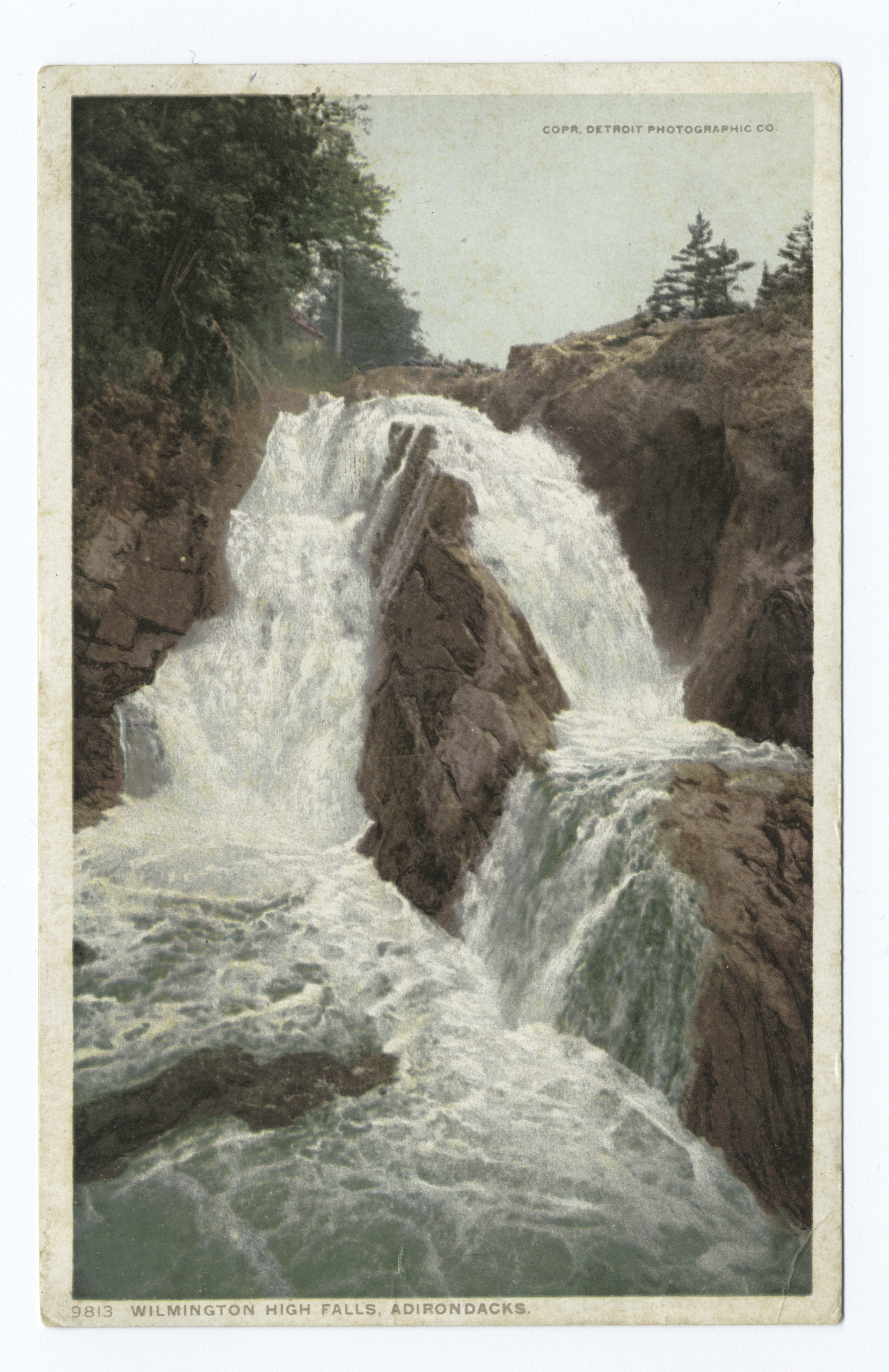
Wilmington High Falls

The West Branch of the Ausable arises from the confluence of the MacIntyre, South Meadow and Marcy Brooks, east of Mount Jo near the Adirondak Loj; it then runs 36 miles (58 km) northeast to Au Sable Forks (44°26′25″N 73°40′28″W), and is fed by Lake Placid and the Chubb River along the way. At high water-levels, the upper end provides demanding white-water paddling opportunities. Further along, it runs through High Falls Gorge at the Wilmington Notch, a gorge formed by a fault zone, with 700-foot (210 m) cliffs on one side and 1,700-foot (520 m) cliffs on the other.

== East Branch Ausable River ==
The East Branch arises from Upper and Lower Ausable lakes in the Ausable Valley, which forms the south side of the Great Range. The first 4 miles (6 km) are especially scenic, and can be viewed from trails on either side maintained by the Adirondack Trail Improvement Society. The river is then met by the Cascade Brook which flows from the Cascade Lakes, beneath Cascade Mountain, on its way to Au Sable Forks.

== See also ==
- Carpenter's Flats Bridge
- Double-Span Metal Pratt Truss Bridge
- List of rivers in New York
