= New York State Route 348 =

Former highway in New York, U.S.

New York State Route 348
- Fiske Road
- Map of Clinton County and vicinity with NY 348 highlighted in red

Route information
- Maintained by NYSDOT
- Length: 6.26 mi (10.07 km)
- Existed: 1930–January 7, 1980

Major junctions
- South end: NY 22 in Chazy
- North end: US 9 in Chazy

Location
- Country: United States
- State: New York
- Counties: Clinton

Highway system
- New York Highways; Interstate; US; State; Reference; Parkways
← NY 347	→ NY 349

New York State Route 348 (NY 348) was a state highway located within the town of Chazy in Clinton County, New York, in the United States. It stretched for 6.2 miles (10.0 km) from NY 22 in the hamlet of West Chazy to U.S. Route 9 (US 9) in the hamlet of Chazy and passed under the Adirondack Northway (Interstate 87 or I-87). NY 348 did not intersect any state routes or pass through any communities other than those at each of its termini.

When NY 348 was originally assigned as part of the 1930 renumbering of state highways in New York, it began in West Chazy and ended in the village of Champlain. The route was extended northeastward to Rouses Point by 1931, then truncated to the hamlet of Chazy in the early 1960s. NY 348 ceased to exist entirely in 1980, at which time its former routing became County Route 24 (CR 24).

== Route description ==
NY 348 began at an intersection with NY 22 and West Church Street in the hamlet of West Chazy (within the town of Chazy), located 2 miles (3.2 km) east of Flat Rock State Forest. NY 348 proceeded east along East Church Street, crossing over tracks once used by the Delaware and Hudson Railroad, reaching a junction with CR 25 (Stratton Hill Road). At this junction, NY 348 turned northeast along Fiske Road, crossing over the Little Chazy River and nearby Bayington Brook. Bending further northeast through the town of Chazy, the route paralleled the Delaware and Hudson until reaching a crossing with the Adirondack Northway (I-87).

NY 348 and the Northway did not connect, as NY 348 crossed under the four lane expressway, crossing the alignment of a railroad spur and soon reached the hamlet of Chazy. In Chazy, the route crossed over the Little Chazy River once again then intersected with US 9. This junction with US 9 marked the northern terminus of NY 348.

== History ==
The alignment that would become NY 348 between the hamlet of West Chazy and the town of Chazy was taken over by the state of New York and improved to state highway standards in 1907–1908. The 6.34 miles (10.20 km) alignment was 14 feet (4.3 m) wide and to be constructed with stones approved by the state with sand and limestone filler. The state engineer estimated that the improvement of the road would cost $58,250 (1907 USD), and a contract was let on September 19, 1907 to Jeremiah T. Finch, who commenced work on the new roadway in October of that year. The work was completed 11 months later (September 1908) at the cost of $54,111.94.

NY 348 was assigned as part of the 1930 renumbering of state highways in New York. At the time, it began at NY 22 in West Chazy and ended at US 11 in the village of Champlain. NY 348 had an overlap with US 9 from Chazy to what is now NY 9B in the town of Champlain. Here, US 9 forked to the east and followed the length of modern NY 9B to Rouses Point. NY 348 was extended east to Rouses Point along US 11 and what is now NY 276 by the following year.

In the mid-1940s, US 9 was rerouted to follow its modern alignment through Champlain, creating a lengthy overlap between NY 348 and US 9 from Chazy hamlet to Champlain village. The overlaps with both US 9 and US 11 were eliminated in the early 1960s after NY 348 was truncated on its northern end to its junction with US 9 in Chazy.

NY 348 was removed from the state highway system in 1980. The designation officially ceased to exist on January 7, 1980, and ownership and maintenance of the route was transferred from the state of New York to Clinton County on April 1, 1980, as part of a highway maintenance swap between the two levels of government. The former routing of NY 348 was redesignated as CR 24.

== Major intersections ==
The entire route was in Chazy, Clinton County.

mi	km	Destinations	Notes
0.00	0.00	NY 22	Hamlet of West Chazy
6.26	10.07	US 9	Hamlet of Chazy
1.000 mi = 1.609 km; 1.000 km = 0.621 mi

== See also ==
- List of county routes in Clinton County, New York
