= Overton Corners–Lacolle 221 Border Crossing =

Canada–United States border crossing

Overton Corners-Lacolle 221 Border Crossing
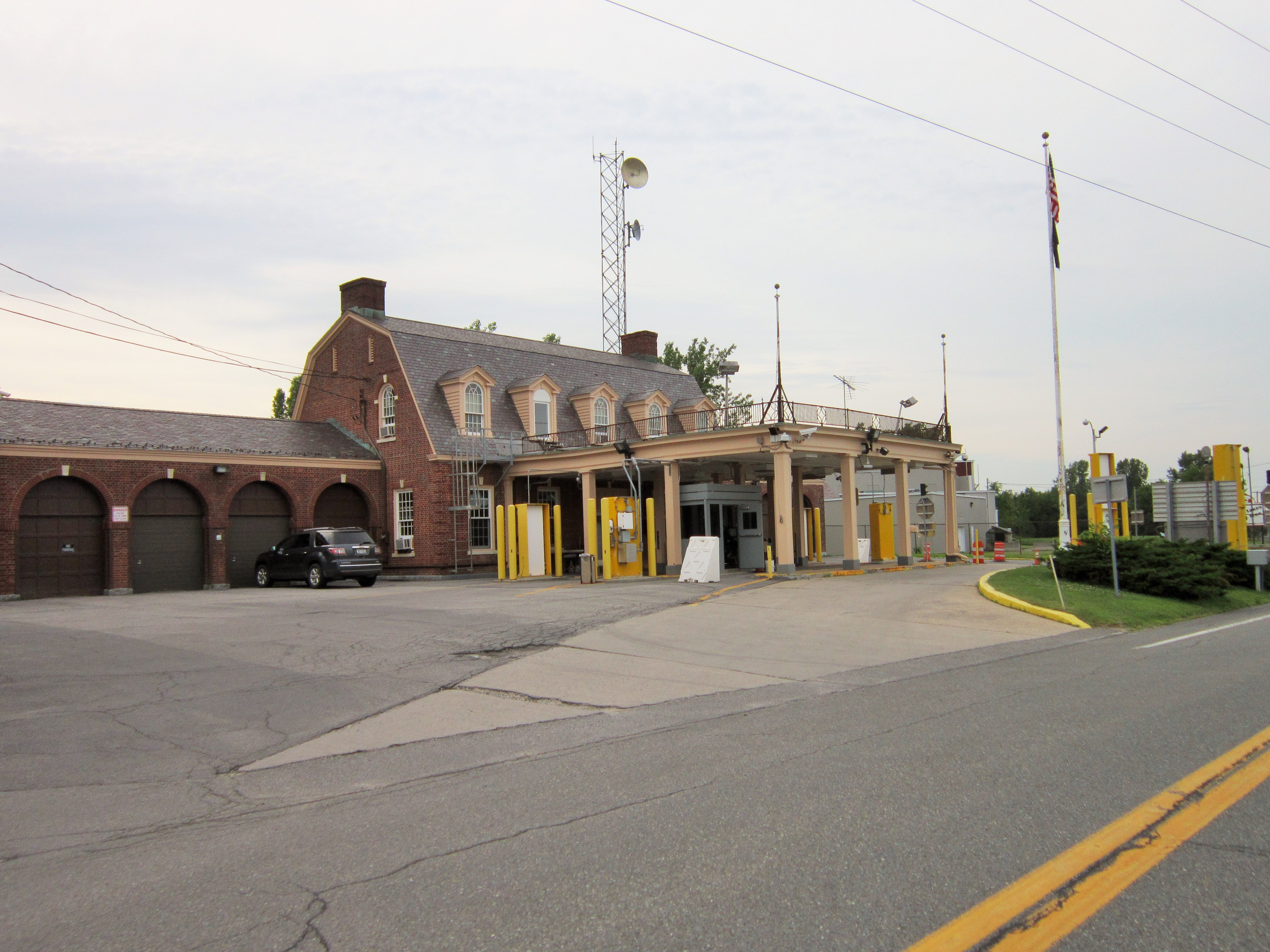
- US Border Station at Overton Corners, NY

Location
- Country: United States; Canada
- Location: NY 276 / R-221; US Port: 427 State Route 276, Champlain, NY 12919; Canadian Port: 300 Route 221, Lacolle, Quebec J0J 1J0
- Coordinates: 45.009886°N 73.400195°W

Details
- Opened: 1913

Website
- https://www.cbp.gov/contact/ports/champlain
- U.S. Inspection Station—Rouses Point (Overton Corners), New York
- U.S. National Register of Historic Places
- Location within New York Location within the United States
- Location: NY 276, Rouses Point, New York
- Built: 1931
- Architect: Louis A. Simon, James A. Wetmore
- Architectural style: Georgian Revival
- MPS: U.S. Border Inspection Stations MPS
- NRHP reference No.: 14000573
- Added to NRHP: September 10, 2014

The Overton Corners–Lacolle 221 Border Crossing connects the towns of Lacolle, Quebec, to Champlain, New York, on the Canada–United States border. This crossing is open from 6:00 a.m. until 22:00, 365 days per year. Because the village of Lacolle, Quebec, has two border crossings, this one is called 221 to indicate it is the crossing on Quebec Route 221. The other crossing is the Rouses Point–Lacolle 223 Border Crossing immediately to the east. Conversely, the US Border station is sometimes called 276 because it is located on New York State Route 276.

During the era of Prohibition in the United States, this crossing was one of the busiest on the US-Canada border. The roads leading to it in both the US and Canada were in good condition and was a popular route for traffic traveling between Montreal and New York City. During that era, it was common for large queues of southbound traffic to build up approaching US Customs, as people attempted to smuggle alcohol into the United States.

In 2014 the brick Georgian Revival inspection station on the U.S. side was listed on the National Register of Historic Places, along with other similar border inspection stations in New York and elsewhere along the Canadian and Mexican borders.

== Overton Corners Border Station ==
=== Architectural description ===
The Overton Corners Border Inspection Station is located at a bend in the road of New York State Route 276 at a crossroads with Canadian Route 221. The Canada Border Services Agency (CBSA) station is directly north and in an unusual arrangement is on the same side of the road and shares a common side lot boundary. There is a lumber yard directly across the road from the station, and these buildings, together with a few early 20th-century houses, form the corner of Overton Corners. In the 1920s through the 1950s, there was an island separating the north and southbound traffic on the Canadian side of the border. The border runs east across a wide open area of fields locally known as "the knuckle". From the north, pavement markings and signage divert cars to the station's three lane inspection bays via an oval, concrete drive. The east facing building is set on a flat, grass covered lot, with the typical border station landscaping arrangement of about six symmetrically placed spruce and hemlock trees spaced across the property. Public parking is provided on the south side of the building.

The red brick station is in a four-part plan composed of a 1 1/2-story center block with two single story wings on its north and south facades and a perpendicular truck inspection dock extension at the end of the south wing for an L-shaped plan. There is a three lane inspection canopy extending from the east facade of the main block. The center block is five bays wide with five clapboard sided, front gable dormers placed on the slate covered gambrel roof on both east and west elevations. There are two interior end chimneys. Brickwork quoins ornament the building corners with cast stone keystones and sills at each of the window openings. On the first floor, sash is the original 12/12. On the second floor, the dormer window openings are arched with 8/8 Gothic sash. The center entry has a double leaf replacement glass and aluminum door.

The north and south wings of the building are divided into four arched vehicle bays on the east and four bays of 12/12 sash on the west facade. They are a single bay in width beneath slate covered hip roofs. Quoins are repeated at the wing corners. On the south wing, the inspection shed, one bay opening has been closed, and three bays have their original wooden overhead doors. Attached to it is a taller addition beneath a hipped roof. This section is entered by a double width overhead door. On the north wing, the garage, there are four wooden overhead doors.

The flat roofed inspection canopy which extends to the east in three lanes is topped by a wrought iron railing on three sides and supported by its original paneled wooden piers. Sash on one dormer has been removed and replaced with a door to give access to the flat roof of the canopy. On the west facade a clapboard covered storm vestibule was added in 1934.

On the interior of the main block the first floor is open across its full width. Two paneled counters separate this full width public space from three offices and a bathroom at the rear. The counters are themselves divided by a short wall, behind which is the center stairs which connects basement to second floor. Interior finishes throughout the building are largely intact with plaster walls and ceilings, and architrave door surrounds. Flooring on the first level is original red tile set in a concrete border. Carpeting has been added in the offices and the ceilings on both first and second floors have been lowered and installed with recessed fluorescent fixtures. At the foot of the stairs into the basement is a large safe. The balance of the basement space is devoted to mechanical equipment.

The second floor has a double loaded corridor with two detention rooms, two toilets with original wood stall partitions and pedestal sinks and four office rooms. The spaces are currently unused.

In 1958 the south truck dock was added to the building, a standby generator was installed in 1966, and in 1968 the main entry was replaced.

== Construction history and space inventory ==
=== Building details ===
	Square Footage	Building Dimensions	
Floor Area Total:	6725	Stories/Levels:	2
First Floor Area:	3762	Perimeter:	375(Linear Ft.)
Occupiable Area:	0	Depth:	0(Linear Ft.)
	Height:	33(Linear Ft.)	
	Length:	0(Linear Ft.)	

=== Construction history ===
Start Year	End Year	Description	Architect
1931	0	Original Construction	
1938	0	Install Mirrors at Canopy	Treasury Dept.
1958	0	Truck Inspection Dock	GSA
1963	0	Canopy & Roof Replacement	GSA
1966	0	Install Generating Plant Equipment	GSA
1968	0	Misc. Repairs & Alterations	GSA

=== Significance ===
The Rouses Point Border Inspection Station at Overton Corner in Rouses Point, New York is one of seven existing border inspection stations built between 1931 and 1934 along the New York and Canada–US border. Georgian Revival in style, the building was designed by the Office of the Supervising Architect under James A. Wetmore, during tenure of the Secretary of the Treasury, Ogden L. Mills, and constructed between 1931 and 1932. At the time of its construction Louis A. Simon was Superintendent of the Architectural Section. Border stations were constructed by the federal government in New England along the border with Canada during the 1930s and several common plans and elevations can be discerned among the remaining stations. Rouses Point-Overton Corner shares with the others a residential scale, a Neo-colonial style, and an organization to accommodate functions of both customs and immigration services.

Border Stations are associated with four important events in United States history: the imposition of Prohibition between 1919 and 1933; enactment of the Elliott–Fernald Public Buildings Act in 1926 which was followed closely by the Depression; and the increasing usage of the automobile whose price was increasingly affordable thanks to Henry Ford's creation of the industrial assembly line. The stations were constructed as part of the government's program to improve its public buildings and to control casual smuggling of alcohol, which most often took place in cars crossing the border. Their construction was also seen as a means of giving work to the many locally unemployed.

The Rouses Point-Overton Corner border station is one of the best preserved in New York. It is the only station to have had an addition made to it. While the border stations have all sustained systematic alterations, they have retained, in varying degrees, most of their original fabric. This station is on both exterior and interior an example of the building type, its character defining features well-maintained and intact, the addition a compatible and equally well-crafted one.

=== History ===
The era of Prohibition begun in 1919 with the Volstead Act and extended nationwide by the ratification of the Eighteenth Amendment to the United States Constitution in 1920, resulted in massive bootlegging along the Canada–US border. In New York, early efforts to control bootlegging were carried out by a small number of Customs officers and border patrol officers who were often on foot and horseback. In many cases New York Custom Houses were a mile or so south of the border and travelers were expected to stop in and report their purchases. The opportunity to remedy this situation and support enforcement of the Prohibition laws was offered by enactment of the Elliott–Fernald public buildings act of 1926 which authorized the government through the Treasury Department to accelerate its building program and began its allocation with $150,000,000 which it later increased considerably.

Rouses Point was the main point of entry for bootleggers who traveled along the so-called Rum Trail which was Route 9 between St. Jean in Canada and Plattsburgh, New York. At the time Prohibition was repealed, the Rouses Point-Overton Corner border inspection station had been in operation for a year. Rouses Point had two new stations and the one at Overton Corner was especially important as it was on the only paved road across the border, so was heavily traveled. The end of Prohibition did not mean the end of smuggling, as the public had developed a taste for Canadian liquor and its bootleggers had discovered the money that could be made smuggling raw alcohol into Canada where prices for it were considerably higher. Rouses Point continued to operate to interdict this activity.

While the seven New York border inspection stations had been designated for construction as early as 1929, land acquisition and the designing and bidding process was stalled at various stages for each of the buildings and their construction took place unevenly over a period of five years. Overton Corner was finished mid-way among the stations. It is still in active use.

=== Statement of eligibility for the National Register of Historic Places ===
The Rouses Point-Overton Corner Border Inspection Station is one of seven border stations in New York which are eligible for the National Register according to Criteria A, B and C. The stations have national, state and local significance.

The station is associated with three events which converged to make a significant contribution to the broad patterns of our history: Prohibition, the Public Buildings Act of 1926 and the mass-production of automobiles. Although this border station was not completed until a year before the repeal of Prohibition, it was planned and built as a response to the widespread bootlegging which took place along the border with Canada and continued to serve as important role after 1933 when smuggling continued in both directions across the border. The station has been in active use for sixty two years.

Conceived in a period of relative prosperity, the Public Buildings Act came to have greater importance to the country during the Depression and funding was accelerated to bring stimulus to state and local economies by putting to work many of the unemployed in building and then manning the stations. Local accounts make clear the number of jobs the station created. Local labor was used to build the station and residents were appointed customs inspectors.

The Overton Corners Border Inspection Station is associated with the life of Louis A. Simon, FAIA, who as Superintendent of the Architect's Office and then as Supervising Architect of the Procurement Division of the United States Treasury Department was responsible for the design of hundreds of government buildings between 1905 and 1939. During his long tenure with the government, Simon, trained in architecture at MIT, was instrumental in the image of the government projected by its public buildings, an image derived from classical western architecture, filtered perhaps through the English Georgian style or given a regional gloss, but one which continues to operate in the collective public vision of government. Simon was unwavering in his defense of what he considered a "conservative-progressive" approach to design in which he saw "art, beauty, symmetry, harmony and rhythm". The debate which his approach stirred in the architectural profession may still be observed in the fact that he is often omitted in architectural reference works.

The border inspection stations do not individually possess high artistic values, but they do represent a distinguishable entity, that of United States Border Stations whose components are nonetheless of artistic value. This station at Overton Corners is an excellent example of the choice of the Georgian Revival style which was considered appropriate for the upstate New York region. It is almost a duplicate of the station at Trout River and is among the most elaborate of the stations. Its construction is of the highest quality materials and workmanship. It has integrity of setting and feeling associated with its function, and has retained the integrity of its materials.

There is no evidence that the site has yielded or may be likely to yield information important in prehistory or history.

== See also ==
- List of Canada–United States border crossings
- National Register of Historic Places listings in Clinton County, New York
