= Rhoda Elizabeth Waterman White =

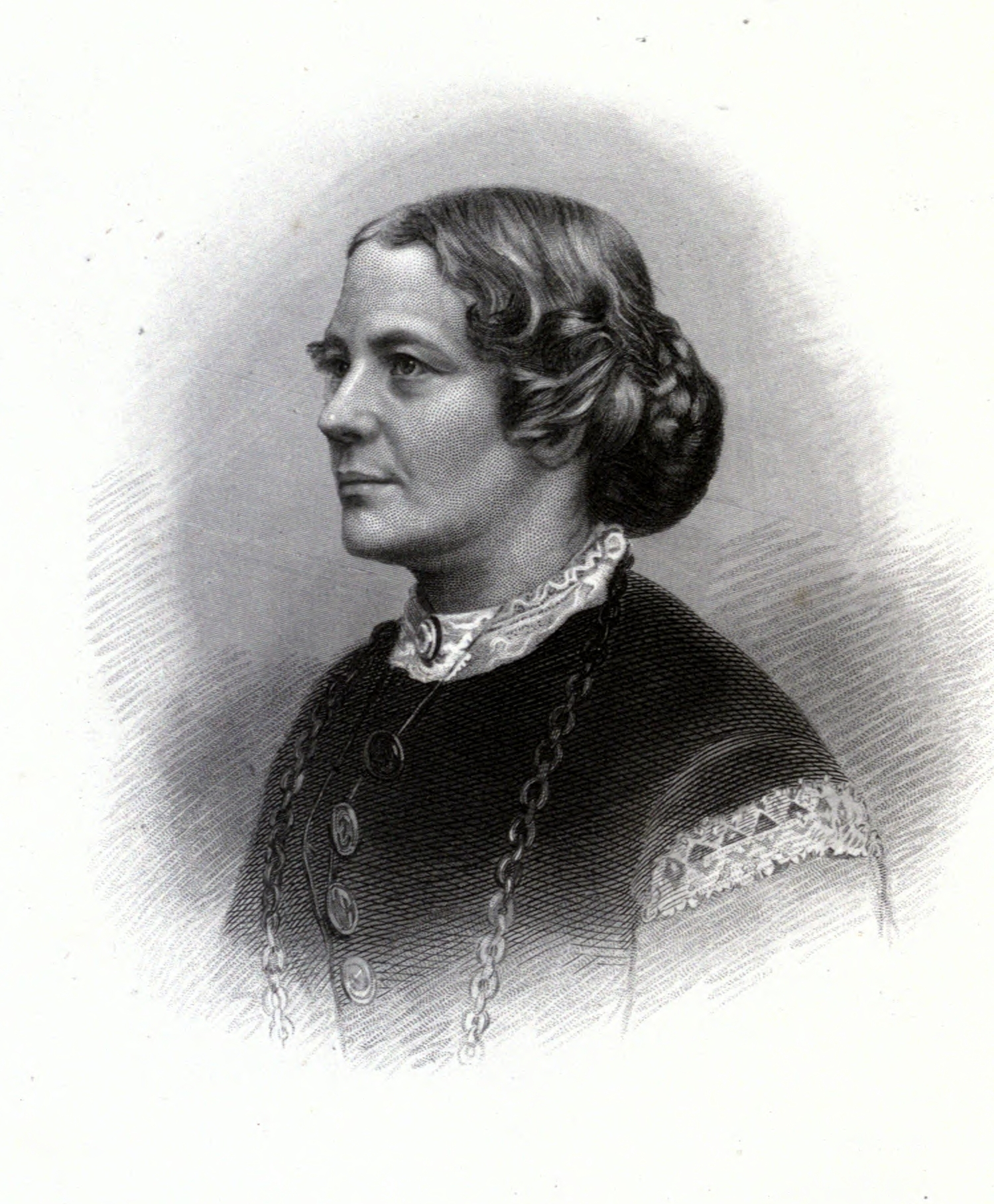
- Born: March 10, 1815; Binghamton
- Died: January 6, 1898 (aged 82); New York City
- Resting place: St. Patrick's Old Cathedral Churchyard
- Occupation: Writer
- Parent(s): Thomas G. Waterman

Rhoda Elizabeth Waterman White (March 10, 1815 – January 6, 1898) was an American author. Much of her fiction was published under the name of a male persona, Uncle Ben of Rouses Point.

Rhoda Elizabeth Waterman was born on March 10, 1815 in Binghamton, New York, the daughter of Thomas G. Waterman, lawyer and politician, and Pamela Whitney Waterman. Her family was Episcopalian, but in 1834 she married an Irish Catholic lawyer, James W. White, later a judge on the Superior Court of New York. In 1837, she converted to Catholicism herself.

White's early fiction was written under the persona of "Uncle Ben", who has been described as a "wry old bachelor". These include the novel Jane Arlington (1853), the story of the travails of a well-mannered and morally virtuous orphan, and Portraits of My Married Friends, a series of six humorous vignettes about married life. Another Uncle Ben novel, The Buccaneer of Lake Champlain (1854), has not been located.

Her work Memoir and Letters of Jenny C. White Del Bal (1868) is about the life of her deceased daughter, including her daughter's letters describing life in Panama under the rule of Tomás Cipriano de Mosquera.

White was a friend and correspondent of First Lady Mary Todd Lincoln.

Rhoda Elizabeth Waterman White died on 6 January 1898 in New York City.

== Bibliography ==
- Jane Arlington; or, The Defrauded Heiress: A Tale of Lake Champlain (1853)
- The Buccaneer of Lake Champlain (1854)
- Portraits of My Married Friends; or, A Peep into Hymen's Kingdom (1858)
- Mary Staunton; or, The Pupils of Marvel Hall (1860)
- Memoir and Letters of Jenny C. White Del Bal (1868)
- From Infancy to Womanhood: A Book of Instruction or Young Mothers (1881)
- What Will the World Say? An American Tale of Real Life (1885)
