= New York State Route 276 =

State highway in Clinton County, New York, US

New York State Route 276
- Map of Clinton County in northeastern New York with NY 276 highlighted in red

Route information
- Maintained by NYSDOT
- Length: 4.69 mi (7.55 km)
- Existed: c. 1963–present

Major junctions
- West end: US 11 in Champlain
- R-221 at Quebec border
- East end: US 11 in Rouses Point

Location
- Country: United States
- State: New York
- Counties: Clinton

Highway system
- New York Highways; Interstate; US; State; Reference; Parkways
← NY 275	→ NY 277

New York State Route 276 (NY 276) is a state highway located entirely within Clinton County, New York, United States. It connects the town of Champlain to the village of Rouses Point, with both termini situated at intersections with U.S. Route 11 (US 11), approximately 5 miles (8 km) apart. The middle third of the route runs along the southern edge of the Canadian border and connects to Quebec Route 221 by way of the Overton Corners–Lacolle 221 Border Crossing, midway between the villages of Champlain and Rouses Point. In Rouses Point, NY 276 is known as Church Street and Pratt Street. All of NY 276 was originally designated as part of NY 348 before gaining its current designation c. 1963.

== Route description ==
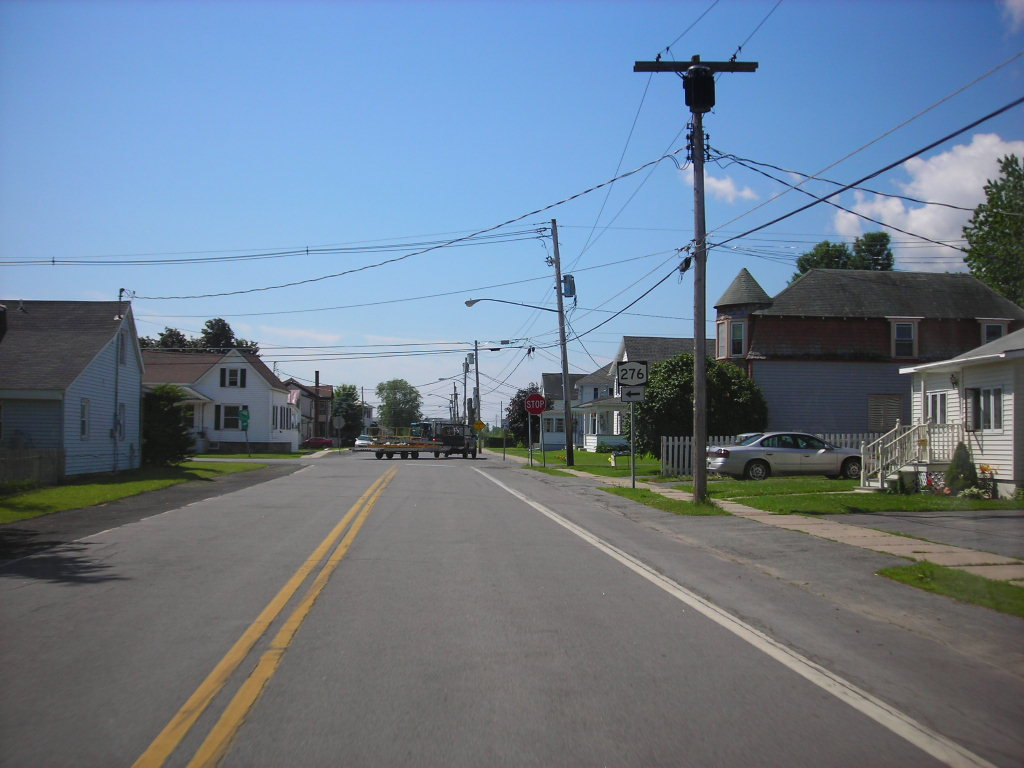
NY 276 eastbound at the junction of Church and Pratt Streets in Rouses Point

NY 276 begins at an intersection with US 11 east of the village of Champlain in the town of the same name. The route heads northeast for 2 miles (3.2 km) through open fields to the Canadian border, where it intersects the de facto southern terminus of Quebec Route 221. Instead of continuing into Quebec, NY 276 turns east, running along the southern edge for the border for just over 1 mile (1.6 km) before turning south toward the village of Rouses Point. The amount of development along the route increases as it enters the village on Church Street.

At Pratt Street, the first cross street that NY 276 meets in Rouses Point, the route turns eastward, following Pratt Street toward the center of the village. After one block, the route crosses the Delaware and Hudson Railroad and serves Rouses Point's Amtrak station at the junction of Pratt and Delaware Streets. NY 276 remains on Pratt Street for another two blocks to the commercial center of the village, where it terminates at a junction with US 11 (Lake Street) on the shores of Lake Champlain. NY 276 serves as a truck route for traffic on US 11 as it bypasses a low-clearance railroad overpass on US 11 south of the village.

== History ==
The portion of modern NY 276 east of the Canadian border crossing in the town of Champlain was originally designated as part of Route 22, an unsigned legislative route, by the New York State Legislature in 1908. It did not receive a signed designation until c. 1931 when the entirety of what is now NY 276 became part of NY 348, which continued south from the current west end of NY 276 to the Chazy hamlet of West Chazy via modern US 11, US 9, and County Route 24. NY 348 was truncated southward to the hamlet of Chazy c. 1963, eliminating a lengthy overlap with US 9. The former alignment of NY 348 north of US 11 was renumbered to NY 276.

== Major intersections ==
The entire route is in Clinton County.

Location	mi	km	Destinations	Notes
Town of Champlain	0.00	0.00	US 11 – Champlain, Rouses Point	Western terminus
Town of Champlain	2.02	3.25	R-221 north – Lacolle	Southern terminus of Route 221
Rouses Point	4.69	7.55	US 11 (Lake Street) to US 2 / I-87 / NY 9B – Bridge to Vermont	Eastern terminus
1.000 mi = 1.609 km; 1.000 km = 0.621 mi
