= New York State Route 276 (disambiguation) =

New York State Route 276 is an east–west state highway in Clinton County, New York, United States, that was established ca. 1963.

New York State Route 276 may also refer to:

- New York State Route 276 (1930s) in Allegany County
- New York State Route 276 (1940s) in Nassau County
