= Rouses Point Bridge =

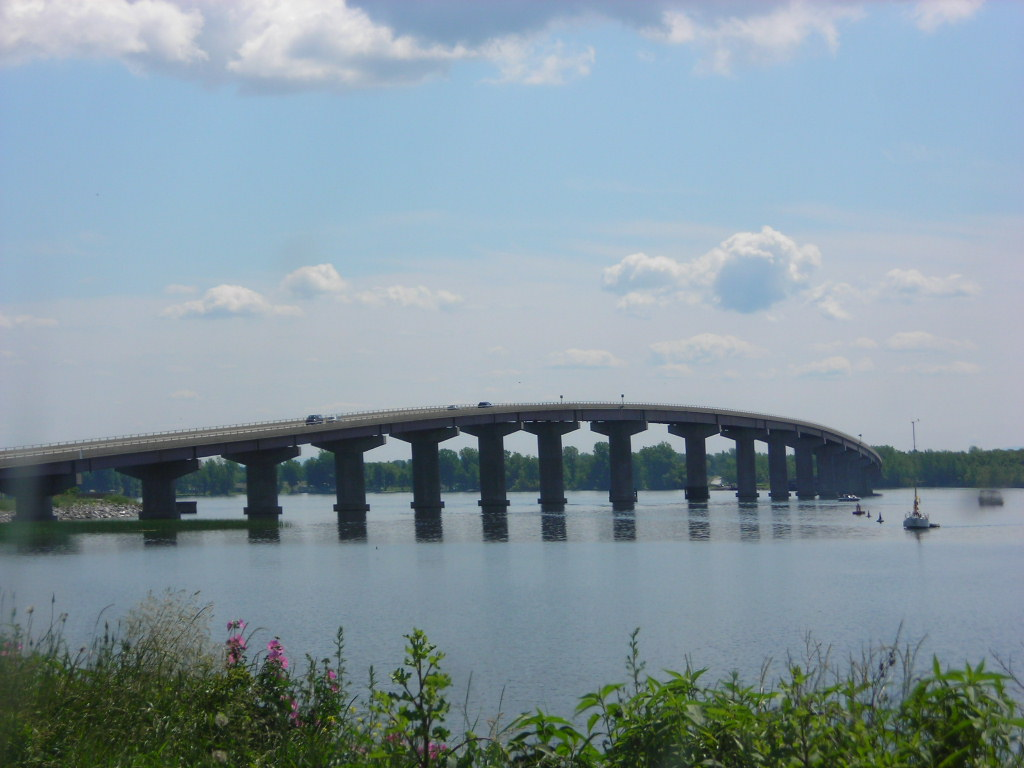
- Rouses Point Bridge
- Coordinates: 44°59′55″N 73°20′54″W
- Carries: US 2
- Crosses: Lake Champlain
- Locale: Rouses Point, New York
- Official name: Korean War Veterans Memorial Bridge

Characteristics
- Design: Curved concrete deck
- Total length: 6,000 feet (1,829 m)
- Width: 50 feet (15 m)
- Clearance below: 60 feet (18 m)

History
- Opened: September 22, 1987; 38 years ago

Location
- Interactive map of Rouses Point Bridge

The Rouses Point Bridge carries U.S. Route 2 (US 2) across Lake Champlain at the point where the Richelieu River begins its trek north to the St. Lawrence Seaway. Also known as the Korean War Veterans Memorial Bridge, it connects Rouses Point, New York in the extreme northeast corner of New York to Alburgh, Vermont. It is the northernmost of three bridge crossings over the approximately 130 miles (210 km)-long Lake Champlain border between New York and Vermont.

== Construction history ==
=== 1937 bridge ===
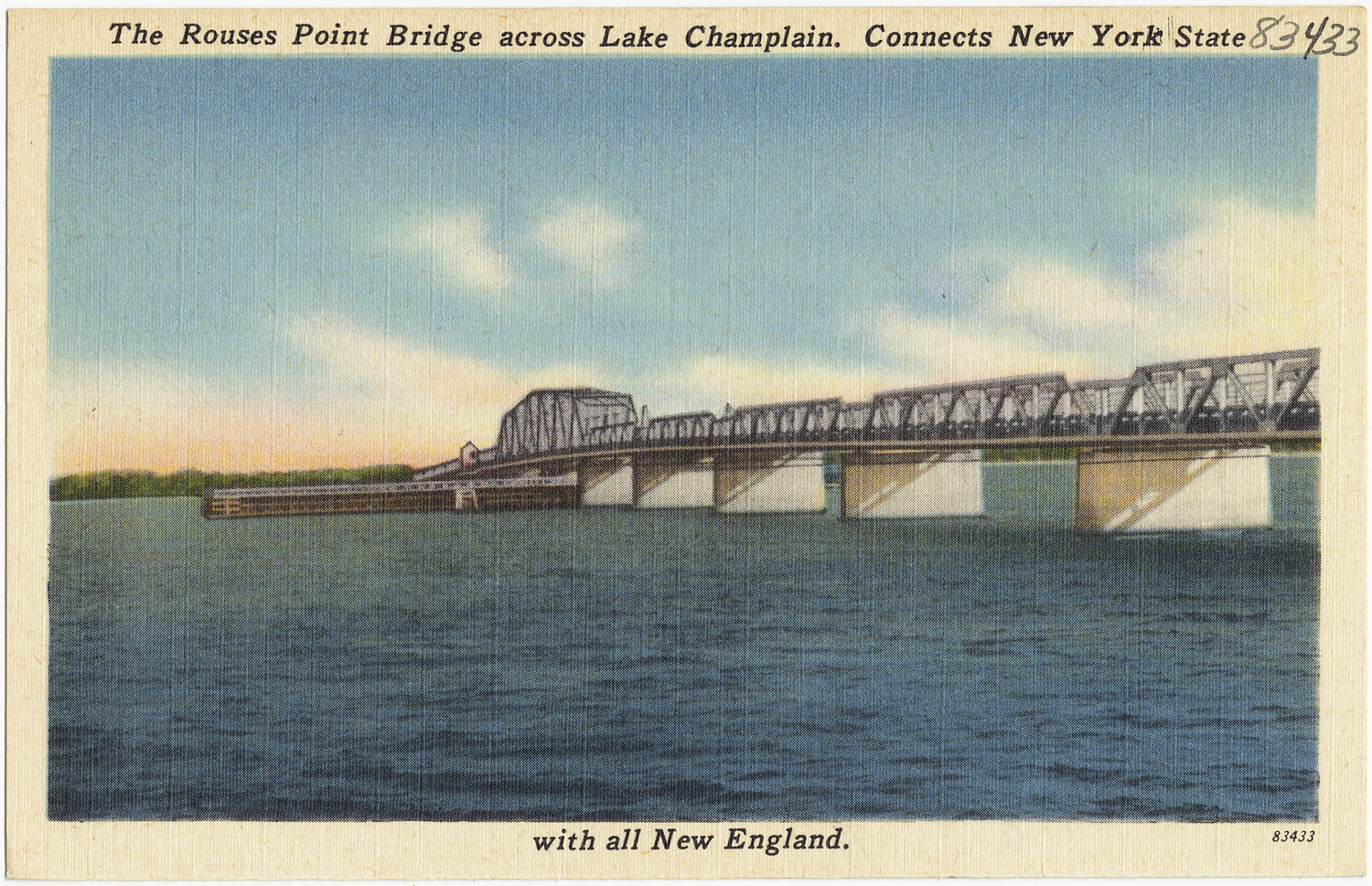
Old Rouses Point Bridge

The first bridge over the river was a Parker through truss structure with a swing bridge center section. Built by the Lake Champlain Bridge Commission from 1936–1937. The first span opened on July 16, 1937.

=== Current bridge ===
It was replaced by the current, over a mile long bridge, in May 1987. This two lane, concrete girder, deck bridge has pull-off lanes in each direction.

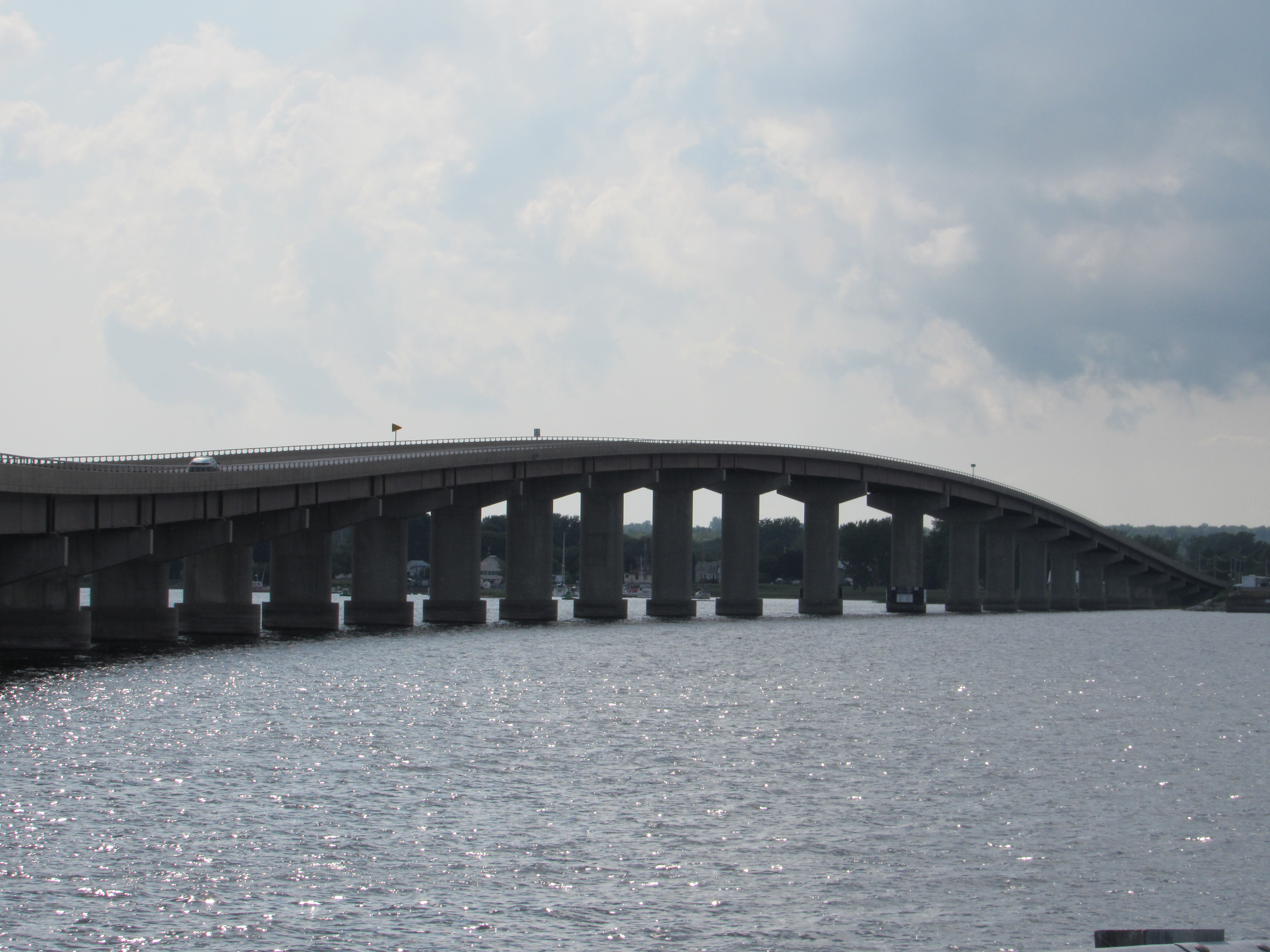
Photo of bridge between Rouses Point, NY and Alburg, VT

Rising 60 feet (18 m) above the water at its mid-point, the bridge curves slightly to the north as it enters Vermont and provides an exceptional view of Fort Montgomery on the west (New York) side of the lake. This fort was partially dismantled in the late 1930s and much of its materials were used in the construction of the first bridge. Fort Montgomery was in turn the successor of Fort Blunder which the United States accidentally built in Canada after the War of 1812.
