= Fort Montgomery (Lake Champlain) =

Coordinates: 45.0056°N 73.3490°W

- U.S. National Register of Historic Places
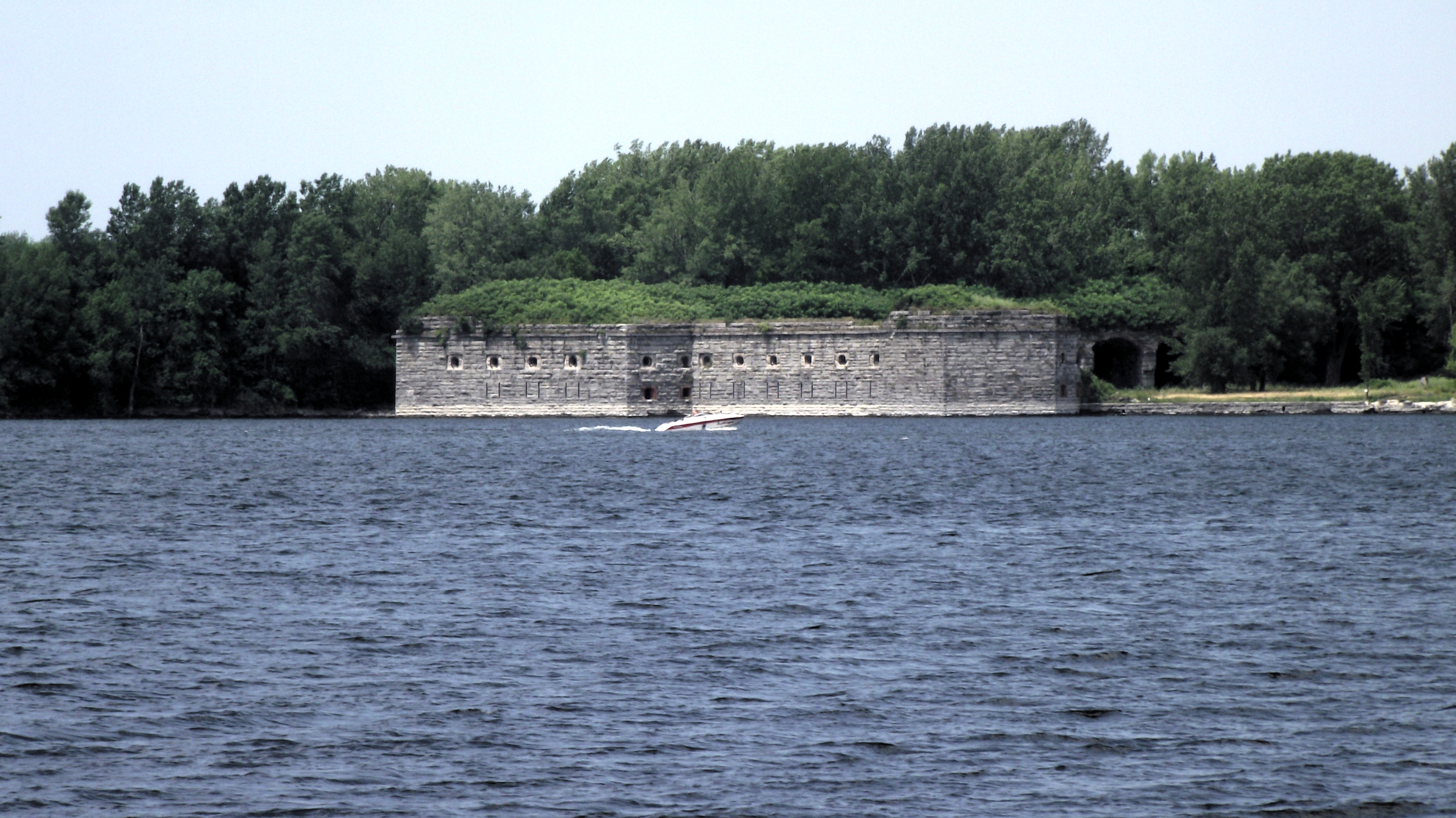
- The remaining southern two bastions and curtain (wall) of Fort Montgomery, July 17, 2011. Note the numerous rifle loopholes on the lower level.

- Location within New York Location within the United States
- Location: Rouses Point, Champlain, Clinton County, New York, US
- Built: 1844
- Architects: Montgomery C. Meigs; Joseph Totten
- NRHP reference No.: 77000937
- Added to NRHP: August 22, 1977

Fort Montgomery on Lake Champlain is the second of two United States forts built at the northernmost point of the United States part of the lake: a first, unnamed fort had been built on the same site in 1816 but had been disassembled after engineers realised they were building on Canadian territory. Following the realignment of the border in 1842, a second fortification named Fort Montgomery was built on the same site in 1844.

The current stone fortification, the second fort, was built between 1844 and 1871 at the Canada–US border of Lake Champlain at Island Point in the village of Rouses Point, New York.

== Background ==
=== "Fort Blunder" ===
Construction had begun on the first fort at this location, an octagonal structure with 30-foot-high (9.1 m) walls, in 1816 to protect against an attack from British Canada such as that which led to the Battle of Plattsburgh in 1814. In July 1817, President James Monroe visited the incomplete fortification and the adjacent military reservation known locally as "the commons".

When a new survey discovered that the 45th parallel was actually located some 0.75 miles (1.21 km) south compared to the markers on the 1771-1773 Collins–Valentine line, effectively placing the fort in Canada, all construction on this first fort stopped and the site was abandoned. Much of its material was scavenged by the locals for use in their own homes and public buildings. It became popularly known as "Fort Blunder" for this reason.

No evidence has come to light that this first fort was ever named, with most contemporary documents simply referring to it as the "works", "fortification", or "battery" at Rouse's Point. It is often mistakenly referred to as Fort Montgomery. The site of the first fort was listed on the National Register of Historic Places under the name "Fort Montgomery" in 1977.

=== Fort Montgomery ===
It was ultimately decided that a second fort would be constructed on the site after the Webster–Ashburton Treaty of 1842 ceded strategically important Island Point, the site of the 1816 fort and the northernmost point on Lake Champlain, to the United States. Construction began on the new fortification two years later in 1844, dubbed Fort Montgomery, in honor of the Revolutionary War soldier Major general Richard Montgomery who was killed at Quebec City during the 1775 invasion of Canada. Fort Montgomery was one of a very few "Permanent" or "Third System" forts built along the Northern Frontier, most being constructed along the Atlantic Coast.

Work on the fort remained almost continuous through 1870, with the peak of construction taking a frenzied pace during the American Civil War, amidst rumors of possible British intervention against the Union from Canada. Possibly to assuage those concerns, a detachment of the 14th U.S. Infantry was actually garrisoned at the fort for three months in 1862. These fears were eventually proven to be not that far-fetched when the St. Albans Raid, the northernmost action of the Civil War, took place in nearby Vermont in 1864 involving a raid by 21 Confederate soldiers from Canada.

Over the roughly 30-year period of Fort Montgomery's construction, no expense was spared and the work represented some of the period's most advanced military technology. At peak points on the project, the labor force consisted of roughly 400 stonecutters and masons plying their trades at the site. When its basic structure was completed, the fortification boasted walls some 48 feet (15 m) high and gun emplacements for 125 cannon on three tiers.

The fort was also one of only nine examples constructed in the United States to have a moat, another being Fort Jefferson in the Dry Tortugas. This made Fort Montgomery essentially surrounded on all sides by water and accessible only by a retractable drawbridge from the land side. An interesting and innovative design feature in its own right, this drawbridge could be mechanically pivoted on a central balance point with one end raising to block the entrance and the other end dropping into a curved pit in the postern, or sally port, behind the doorway like a see-saw. Raising this bridge would effectively cut off the fort from any entrance by land as the bottom of the fort's doorway stood a full 15 feet (4.6 m) above the water of the moat or "wet ditch" below. A similar entrance from the lake side, known as a "water gate", also utilized a drawbridge which accessed a dock extending from the fort into the lake.

Directly behind the fort itself, between it and the actual shoreline, a manmade island was constructed. Standing higher than the fort itself, this earthen berm was known as the "cover face" and protected the fort against an enemy on land being able to utilize heavy siege guns to reduce the walls. It was connected to the land by a narrow stone causeway and to the fort itself by a bridge. Also during the fort's later construction, Chief Engineer of the U.S. Army Joseph Totten invented an iron reinforced embrasure for cannon which would better protect the gunners inside a fort, an upgrade which was retrofitted into Fort Montgomery's design on its unfinished upper gun tier, while the lower, already completed level sported the older style brick embrasures.

Initially designed to be manned by a force of 800 men, the fort was never fully garrisoned and mainly took on a role as a military deterrent along the border. Many of the Third System forts by design were never permanently garrisoned, ultimately intended to be waiting and ready for action only if needed. According to War Department records, in 1886 when Fort Montgomery was most heavily armed, it mounted 74 guns of its full 125 gun capacity, including 8 inches (200 mm) and 10 inches (250 mm) Rodman cannon. Most of these guns were mounted training northward towards Canada. Although never placed in position, two 15 inches (380 mm) Rodmans were present at the site for years sitting on the parade ground waiting to be mounted atop the wall.

In 1880, Commanding General of the Army William Tecumseh Sherman toured the fortification and was so impressed with the magnitude of the site, he returned to Washington and intended to have the military garrison at nearby Plattsburgh Barracks stationed instead at the fort. Due to the outcry of many prominent local citizens, however, the troop movement never took place.

In the years following the Civil War, with the introduction of much more modern and powerful armaments such as explosive shells and rapid-firing rifled cannon, the military importance of masonry fortifications such as Fort Montgomery was rapidly drawing to a close. Technology now existed which could allow an enemy force to quickly and easily reduce their casemates and walls to piles of rubble. The last decade of the 19th century slowly saw the removal of the old fort's guns, now long obsolete. By 1900, 37 guns were still present and by 1901, that number had decreased to 20. Purportedly the last of the larger guns were removed and taken down the lake by barge around 1909. After being loaded onto railroad cars at Plattsburgh, many of the iron cannon met their end being melted down for their scrap value in Philadelphia. Following this period the now empty fort was watched over by a caretaker, usually a retired soldier who lived in a nearby house and patrolled the grounds.

== Disposal ==
In 1926, the United States Government sold Fort Montgomery along with its adjacent Military Reservation at public auction. During the period of disuse which followed, as had also happened with the abandoned 1816 fortification, many locals visited the fort, carting off untold amounts of lumber, bricks, windows, and doors for use in their homes and other buildings. Ultimately most of the fort, aside from the gutted westward facing officer's quarters, a small portion of the southern wall and three bastions (two of which remain today), was demolished in 1936–1937. Its massive stones were crushed and dumped into the lake for fill to construct a nearby bridge between Rouses Point, New York and Alburg, Vermont. The property had a number of private owners before it was sold in 1983 to Victor Podd Sr. who constructed the headquarters of the Powertex Corporation on the adjacent "Commons" to the west of the fort. Island Point, the actual fort site, was left untouched.

During the mid-1980s, Podd worked with local historical societies to have the State of New York purchase the property with a view toward possible restoration of the site. Despite being offered the fort at no cost, negotiations were unsuccessful and the State declined to accept the property. Since May 2006, Podds' heirs have attempted to sell the fort on eBay. The first auction ended on June 5, 2006 with a winning bid of $5,000,310,however, the sale was not completed. After being on the market for many years, the property was purchased in 2022 for $750,000. The purchasers, Martin Benoit and Benoit Benoit are brothers and both orthopedic surgeons. The brothers intended to restore the property, with plans for a marina, wedding venue and winery. However, as of 2026, the property remains undeveloped, but remains a popular spot for exploring.

There are current concerns among local preservationists that what remains of the fort today is in danger of a catastrophic structural collapse. This is in part due to the removal of iron reinforcing rods, emplaced around 1886, which were likely cut out for their scrap value during the wartime scrap metal drives of World War II. These rods were originally devised to brace up and support the massive weight of the fort's detached outer wall face, a defensive element of the fort's construction which later proved over time to be a structural flaw. Previously a third remaining bastion on the northern side of the fort suffered a similar collapse and was completely destroyed in 1980, mostly falling into the moat.

In September 2008, the Preservation League of New York State listed Fort Montgomery as one of their "Seven to Save" properties. This listing effectively recognized the historical significance of the Fort Montgomery ruins. It also identified the ruins as being in dire need of stabilization and preservation.

== Bibliography ==
- Millard, James P. (2009). Bastions on the Border: The Great Stone Forts at Rouses Point on Lake Champlain. South Hero, VT: America's Historic Lakes. ISBN 978-0-9749854-1-1.
- Millard, James P. (2005). Fort Montgomery: Through the Years... A Pictorial History of the Great Stone Fort on Lake Champlain. South Hero, VT: America's Historic Lakes. ISBN 978-0-9749854-2-8.
