= New York State Route 9B =

State highway in Clinton County, New York, US

New York State Route 9B
- Map of northeast Clinton County with NY 9B highlighted in red

Route information
- Auxiliary route of US 9
- Maintained by NYSDOT
- Length: 5.97 mi (9.61 km)
- Existed: mid-1940s–present
- Tourist routes: Lakes to Locks Passage (from Chazy to Rouses Point)

Major junctions
- South end: US 9 in Champlain
- North end: US 11 in Rouses Point

Location
- Country: United States
- State: New York
- Counties: Clinton

Highway system
- New York Highways; Interstate; US; State; Reference; Parkways
| ← NY 9A | → NY 9D |

New York State Route 9B (NY 9B) is a state highway located within Clinton County, New York, in the United States. The route serves as a connector between its parent route, U.S. Route 9 (US 9), in the town of Champlain and US 11 in the village of Rouses Point. While US 9 bypasses Rouses Point to the west, NY 9B veers east to serve the village and the shoreline of Lake Champlain. NY 9B is the northernmost section of the Lakes to Locks Passage, an All-American Road. Modern NY 9B was the original alignment of US 9 through the town of Champlain. US 9 was moved onto its present alignment west of Rouses Point in the mid-1940s, at which time its former routing to Rouses Point became NY 9B.

== Route description ==
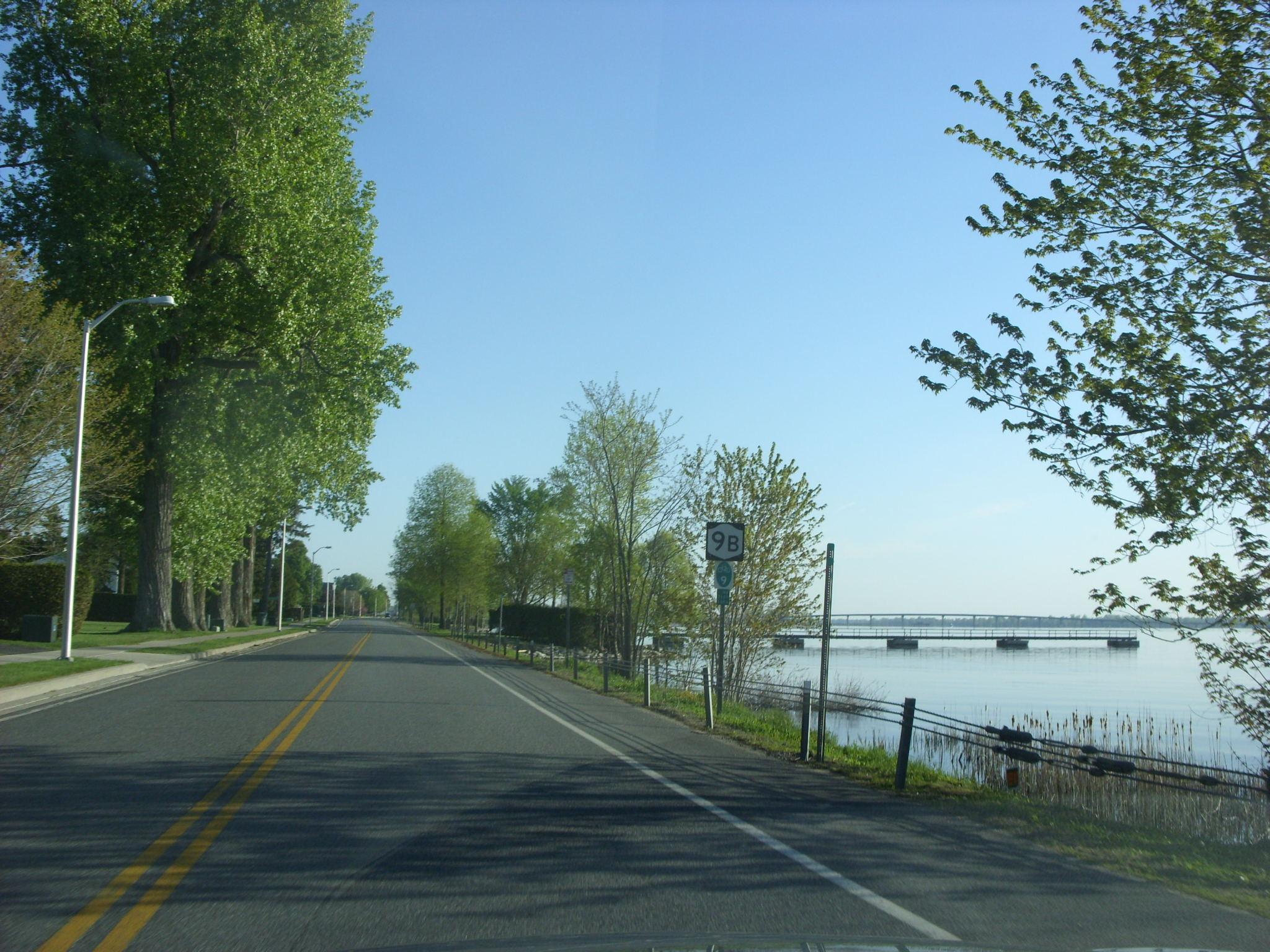
NY 9B northbound in Rouses Point

NY 9B begins at an isolated intersection with US 9 in the town of Champlain. The route initially heads to the northeast, crossing farmland and passing small patches of wooded areas. At Coopersville, the first named location along NY 9B, the highway crosses the Great Chazy River and turns to follow a more easterly routing toward Lake Champlain. NY 9B reaches the shoreline one mile (1.6 km) later, at which point the route makes a sharp turn to the north to follow the western edge of Lake Champlain. It serves a handful of lakeside homes before passing Point au Fer, a peninsula protruding southeastward into the lake. Along this stretch, NY 9B traverses mostly undeveloped areas located one-half mile (0.8 km) inland from the lake.

North of Point au Fer, the route returns to the lake shore as it enters the village of Rouses Point, the second and final location along NY 9B's routing. The surroundings change immediately across the village line as the route, now named Lake Street, serves several residential streets that mark the southern fringe of Rouses Point. After two long blocks, the lakeside homes gradually begin to give way to commercial establishments as NY 9B approaches Champlain Street, an east–west street carrying US 11 into the village. NY 9B ends at Champlain Street while US 11 turns north to follow Lake Street toward Rouses Point's central business district and the Canadian border.

The portion of NY 9B from Lake Shore Road—a county road that meets NY 9B in Coopersville—north to its end at US 11 in Rouses Point is the northernmost leg of the Lakes to Locks Passage, an All-American Road that continues south to Waterford along Lake Champlain, the Champlain Canal, and the Hudson River.

== History ==
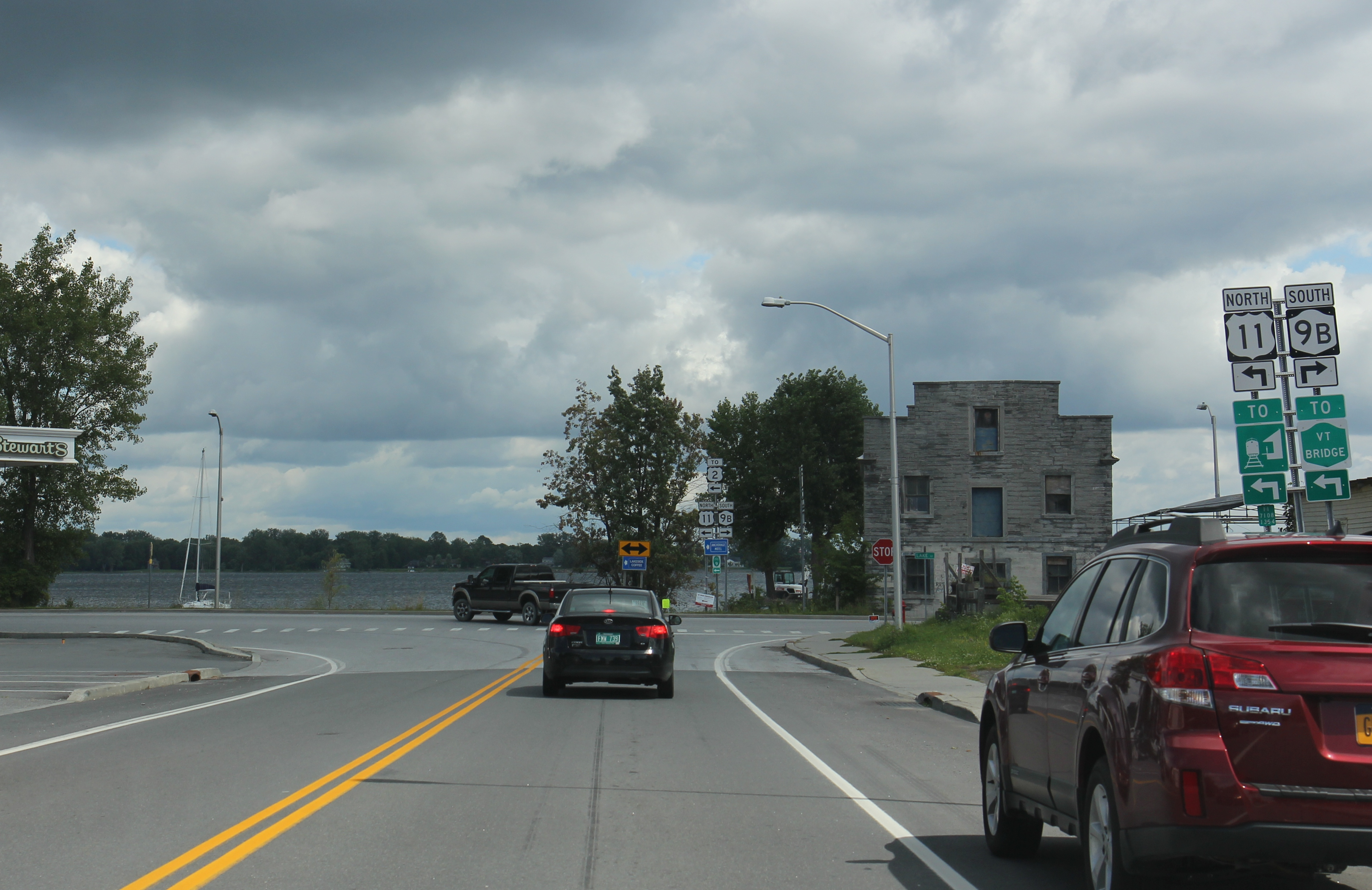
Northern terminus as seen from northbound US 11 in Rouses Point.

In 1908, the New York State Legislature created Route 22, a discontinuous, unsigned legislative route that began at Troy and ended at the Canadian border near Rouses Point. The route entered the town of Champlain on what is now US 9 and followed it north to the modern junction of US 9 and NY 9B. Here, Route 22 turned east onto current NY 9B and continued east and north along it to access Rouses Point. Inside the village, it followed Lake Street north to Pratt Street, where it turned to the northwest and proceeded along modern NY 276 to the border crossing located midway between the villages of Champlain and Rouses Point.

When the first set of posted routes in New York were assigned in 1924, the north half of legislative Route 22—from modern NY 8 near Riparius north to the Canadian border at Rouses Point—became part of NY 6. In 1927, U.S. Highways were first signed in New York, at which time NY 6 was mostly absorbed into the new US 9, including within the town of Champlain. US 9 was realigned in the mid-1940s to bypass Rouses Point to the west and proceed north through the village of Champlain on its way to Canada. Its former alignment to Rouses Point was redesignated as NY 9B, which initially continued north along Lake Street to the Canadian border by way of an overlap with US 11. The overlap remained in place as late as 1979; it was eliminated by 1993.

== Major intersections ==
The entire route is in Clinton County.

| Location | mi | km | Destinations | Notes |
|---|---|---|---|---|
| Town of Champlain | 0.00 | 0.00 | US 9 – Plattsburgh, Champlain | Southern terminus |
| Town of Champlain | 1.6 | 2.6 | CR 22 south (Lake Shore Road) | Northern terminus of CR 22 |
| Rouses Point | 5.97 | 9.61 | US 11 to I-87 / US 2 – Vermont | Northern terminus |
1.000 mi = 1.609 km; 1.000 km = 0.621 mi
