= Champlain (village), New York =

Champlain, New York
- Village
- Location in Clinton County and the state of New York.
- Coordinates: 44°59′12″N 73°26′47″W
- Country: United States
- State: New York
- County: Clinton
- Town: Champlain
- Named after: Samuel de Champlain

Area
  - Total: 1.49 sq mi (3.87 km^{2})
  - Land: 1.46 sq mi (3.77 km^{2})
  - Water: 0.035 sq mi (0.09 km^{2})
- Elevation: 105 ft (32 m)

Population (2020)
  - Total: 1,170
  - Density: 802.8/sq mi (309.98/km^{2})
- Time zone: UTC-5 (EST)
  - Summer (DST): UTC-4 (EDT)
- ZIP code: 12919
- Area code: 518
- FIPS code: 36-13739
- GNIS feature ID: 0946361
- Website: www.vchamplain.com

Champlain is a village in Clinton County, New York, United States. The population was 1,101 at the 2010 census. The village is located in the town of Champlain, approximately 4 miles (6 km) west of Lake Champlain, and is north of Plattsburgh.

== History ==
The lake and the village were named in honor of Samuel de Champlain, who first surveyed the area in 1609. It was part of Canada until 1763, and became part of the United States in 1783.

Champlain was an important staging point in the War of 1812.

The village was incorporated in 1873.

== Geography ==
Champlain village is located in the north-central part of the town of Champlain at 44°59′12″N 73°26′47″W (44.986678, -73.446373). Interstate 87 (the Adirondack Northway) runs past the western side of the village, with access from exits 42 and 43. Montreal is 41 miles (66 km) to the north, and Plattsburgh is 22 miles (35 km) to the south. US 9 passes through the village and intersects US 11 south of the village. NY 276 intersects US-11 east of Champlain.

According to the United States Census Bureau, the village has a total area of 1.4 square miles (3.7 km^{2}), of which 1.4 square miles (3.6 km^{2}) is land and 0.04 square miles (0.1 km^{2}), or 2.71%, is water. The village is west of Lake Champlain and just south of the international border with Quebec. The Great Chazy River flows through the village to Lake Champlain.

== Demographics ==
Historical population
Census	Pop.	Note	%±
1870	1,850		—
1880	1,509		−18.4%
1890	1,275		−15.5%
1900	1,311		2.8%
1910	1,280		−2.4%
1920	1,140		−10.9%
1930	1,197		5.0%
1940	1,354		13.1%
1950	1,505		11.2%
1960	1,549		2.9%
1970	1,426		−7.9%
1980	1,410		−1.1%
1990	1,273		−9.7%
2000	1,173		−7.9%
2010	1,101		−6.1%
2020	1,170		6.3%
U.S. Decennial Census

As of the census of 2000, there were 1,173 people, 521 households, and 309 families residing in the village. The population density was 836.7 inhabitants per square mile (323.1/km^{2}). There were 582 housing units at an average density of 415.1 per square mile (160.3/km^{2}). The racial makeup of the village was 97.19% White, 0.77% Black or African American, 0.26% Native American, 0.51% Asian, 0.09% from other races, and 1.19% from two or more races. Hispanic or Latino of any race were 1.02% of the population.

There were 521 households, out of which 29.0% had children under the age of 18 living with them, 44.0% were married couples living together, 10.9% had a female householder with no husband present, and 40.5% were non-families. 35.9% of all households were made up of individuals, and 17.7% had someone living alone who was 65 years of age or older. The average household size was 2.23 and the average family size was 2.91.

In the village, the population was spread out, with 24.0% under the age of 18, 7.6% from 18 to 24, 28.0% from 25 to 44, 22.0% from 45 to 64, and 18.3% who were 65 years of age or older. The median age was 39 years. For every 100 females, there were 86.5 males. For every 100 females age 18 and over, there were 92.0 males.

The median income for a household in the village was $30,677, and the median income for a family was $38,611. Males had a median income of $32,361 versus $20,263 for females. The per capita income for the village was $18,903. About 7.6% of families and 10.7% of the population were below the poverty line, including 10.9% of those under age 18 and 8.2% of those age 65 or over.

== Education ==
The village is within the Northeastern Clinton Central School District.
