= Champlain, New York =

Town in the United States

- Town
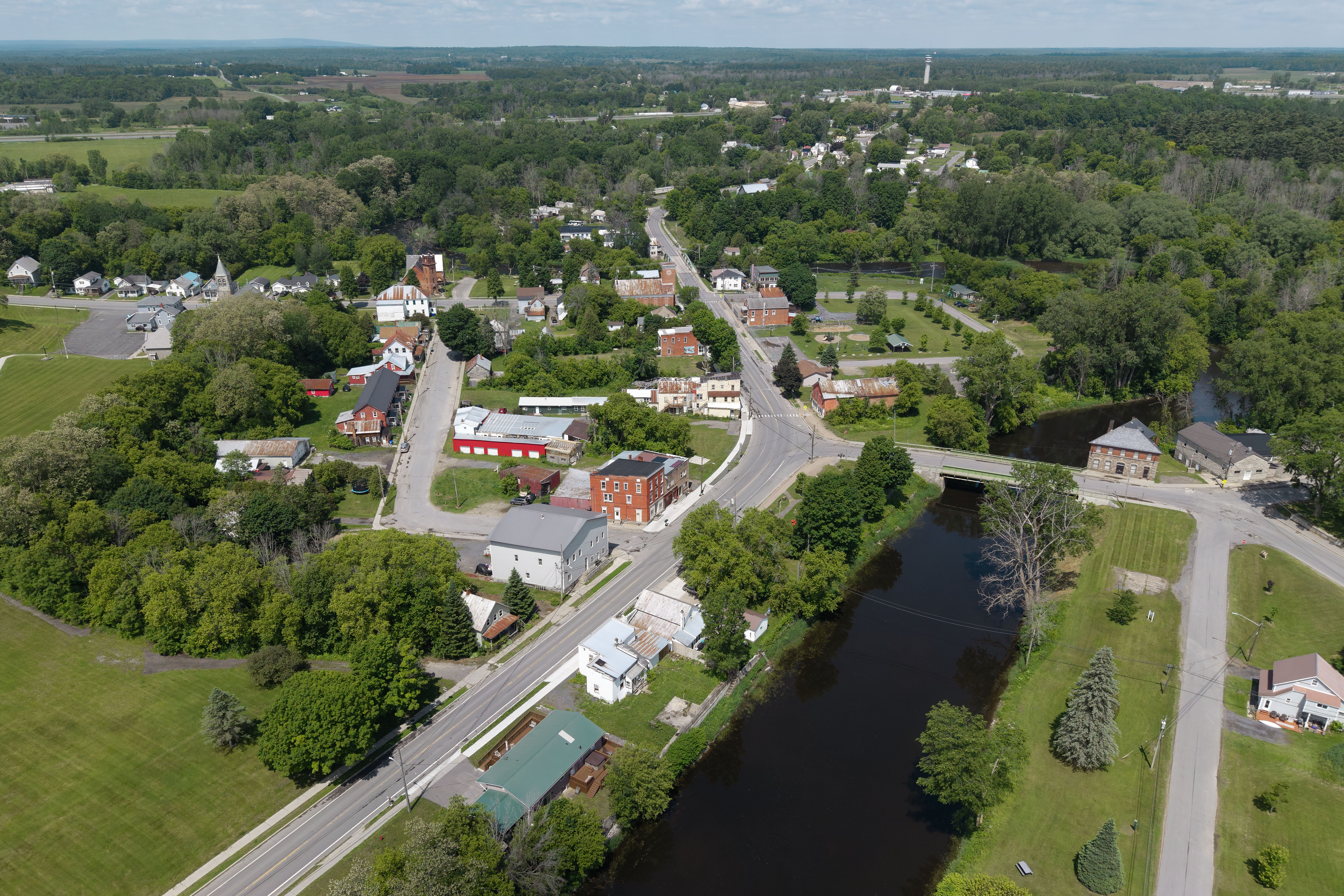
- Downtown (2026)

- Location in Clinton County and the state of New York
- Coordinates: 44°57′54″N 73°26′3″W
- Country: United States
- State: New York
- County: Clinton
- Named for: Samuel de Champlain

Government
  - Type: Town Council

Area
  - Total: 58.81 sq mi (152.33 km^{2})
  - Land: 51.16 sq mi (132.50 km^{2})
  - Water: 7.66 sq mi (19.83 km^{2})
- Elevation: 152 ft (46 m)

Population (2020)
  - Total: 5,745
  - Density: 110.2/sq mi (42.55/km^{2})
- Time zone: UTC-5 (Eastern (EST))
  - Summer (DST): UTC-4 (EDT)
- ZIP Codes: 12919 (Champlain); 12979 (Rouses Point); 12921 (Chazy)
- Area code: 518
- FIPS code: 36-019-13750
- GNIS feature ID: 978809
- Website: www.townofchamplain.gov

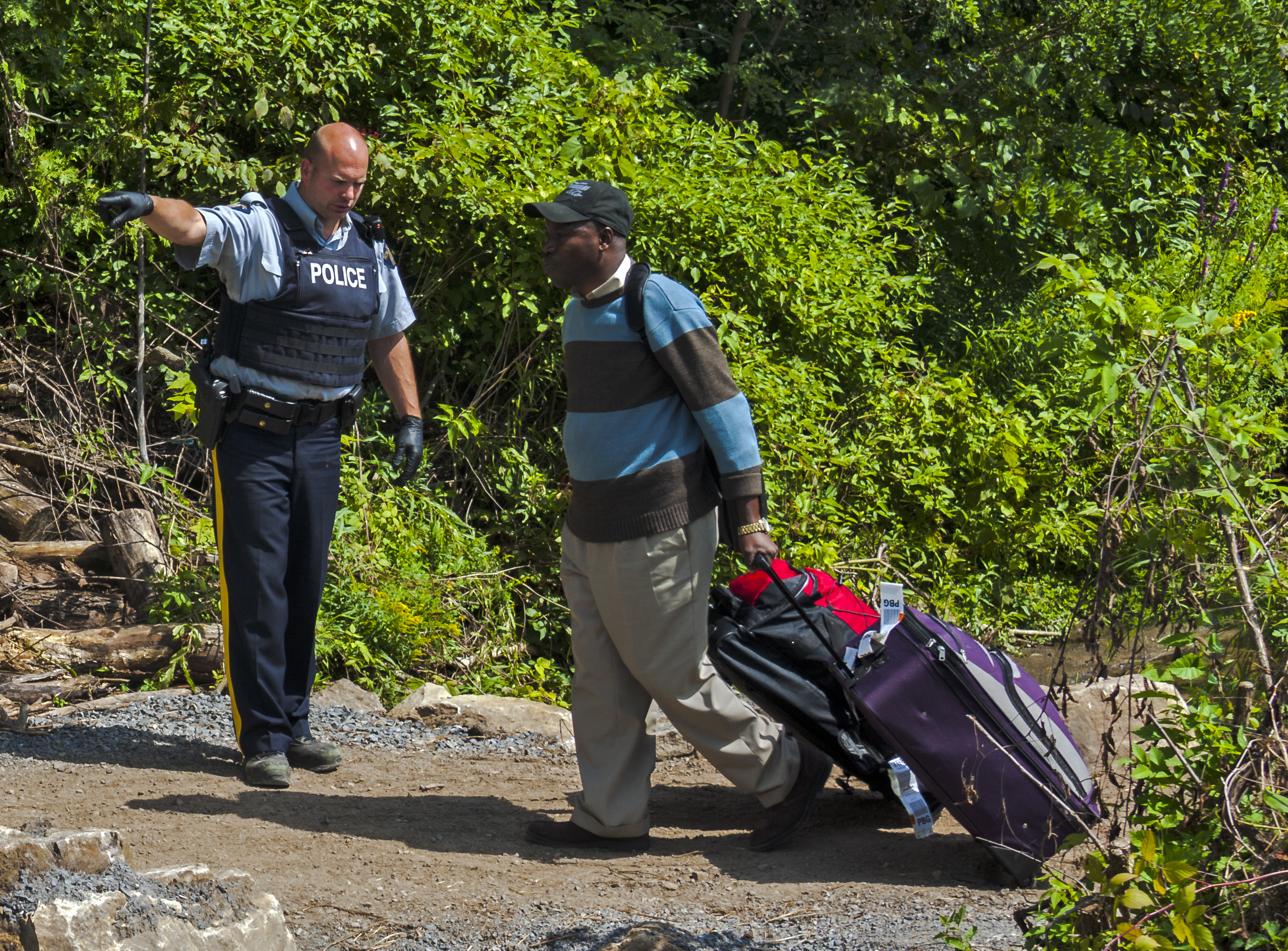
Asylum seeker crossing the Canada–US border illegally from the end of Roxham Road in Champlain, New York, being directed to the nearby processing center by a Mountie

Champlain is a town in Clinton County, New York, United States. The population was 5,754 at the 2010 census. The town is located on the western shore of Lake Champlain, near the northern end of Lake Champlain and is on the U.S./Canadian border.

The town occupies the northeastern corner of Clinton County and the state of New York. Within the town are two villages: Champlain and Rouses Point.

== History ==
Nearby Lake Champlain was an important military and trade route during the colonial period. The lake and the town were named in honor of Samuel de Champlain, who first surveyed the area in 1609. It was part of Canada until 1763 and became part of the United States in 1783.

The town was formed in 1788, the same year the county was established. In 1799, the town was reduced by the formation of the town of Chateaugay (now in Franklin County). The founding of the towns of Chazy and Mooers, in 1804, further reduced Champlain.

Champlain is on the border with Canada and contains three border crossings: Champlain, Overton Corners, and Rouses Point. The Champlain Port of Entry on Interstate 87 is one of the four most important commercial gateways on the northern border, connecting New York City to the south with Montreal to the north, via Quebec Autoroute 15.

The Miromar Factory Outlet in Champlain, New York, was built in 1993 and closed on September 9, 2000.

== Geography ==
Champlain is approximately 43 miles (69 km) south of Montreal. According to the 2010 United States census, the town has a total area of 58.8 square miles (152.3 km^{2}), of which 51.2 square miles (132.7 km^{2}) is land and 7.6 square miles (19.6 km^{2}), or 12.90%, is water.

Lake Champlain and the Richelieu River are on the eastern edge of the town, which shares a border with Grand Isle County, Vermont. The town line to the north is the international border with Saint-Bernard-de-Lacolle, Quebec, Canada.

The 176-mile (283 km) Adirondack Northway (I-87) is a major north-south highway that begins at the Canadian border at Champlain and travels south to Albany, connecting to the New York State Thruway. US 9 parallels I-87, and U.S. Route 11 runs north-south across the town. US 2 intersects US-11 by Rouses Point. New York State Route 9B intersects US-11 in the northeast and US-9 in the southern part of Champlain, providing a highway closer to Lake Champlain. New York State Route 276 partly runs along the international border.

== Demographics ==
Historical population
Census	Pop.	Note	%±
1820	1,618		—
1830	2,456		51.8%
1840	3,632		47.9%
1850	5,067		39.5%
1860	5,857		15.6%
1870	5,080		−13.3%
1880	5,407		6.4%
1890	5,207		−3.7%
1900	4,748		−8.8%
1910	4,637		−2.3%
1920	4,535		−2.2%
1930	4,848		6.9%
1940	4,938		1.9%
1950	5,118		3.6%
1960	5,544		8.3%
1970	5,633		1.6%
1980	5,889		4.5%
1990	5,796		−1.6%
2000	5,791		−0.1%
2010	5,754		−0.6%
2020	5,745		−0.2%
U.S. Decennial Census

As of the 2000 census, there were 5,791 people, 2,386 households, and 1,562 families residing in the town. The population density was 113.1 inhabitants per square mile (43.7/km^{2}). There were 2,718 housing units at an average density of 53.1 per square mile (20.5/km^{2}). The racial makeup of the town was 97.74% White, 0.52% Black or African American, 0.29% Native American, 0.36% Asian, 0.02% Pacific Islander, 0.26% from other races, and 0.81% from two or more races. Hispanic or Latino of any race were 1.00% of the population.

There were 2,386 households, out of which 31.1% had children under the age of 18 living with them, 51.0% were married couples living together, 10.7% had a female householder with no husband present, and 34.5% were non-families. 28.7% of all households were made up of individuals, and 11.9% had someone living alone who was 65 years of age or older. The average household size was 2.39 and the average family size was 2.95.

In the town, the population was spread out, with 25.0% under the age of 18, 7.1% from 18 to 24, 28.7% from 25 to 44, 24.6% from 45 to 64, and 14.6% who were 65 years of age or older. The median age was 38 years. For every 100 females, there were 95.5 males. For every 100 females age 18 and over, there were 92.8 males.

The median income for a household in the town was $37,775, and the median income for a family was $46,113. Males had a median income of $35,198 versus $26,345 for females. The per capita income for the town was $18,987. About 6.7% of families and 9.2% of the population were below the poverty line, including 9.5% of those under age 18 and 6.9% of those age 65 or over.

== Communities and locations in the town ==
- Catfish Point – A location on the shore of Lake Champlain by Kings Bay.
- Champlain – A village in the central part of the town near the US-9 and US-11 intersection.
- Coopersville – A hamlet by the Great Chazy River on NY-9B. It was also known as "Corbeau" and settled circa 1789.
- Corbeau Creek – An important tributary of the Great Chazy River.
- Great Chazy River – A river flowing through the town to King Bay in Lake Champlain.
- Kings Bay – A bay of Lake Champlain, south of Rouses Point.
- Kings Bay Wildlife Management Area – A state conservation area on the shore of Lake Champlain.
- Perry Mills – A hamlet in the northwestern part of the town on the Great Chazy River. Roxham Road here is the place where more people cross from the U.S. into Canada irregularly to seek asylum, than any other point on the Canada–United States border.
- Point au Fer – A peninsula in Lake Champlain south of Rouses Point, and site of Revolutionary War-era Point Au Fer Fort.
- Rouses Point – A village in the northeastern part of the town near Lake Champlain.
- Scales Point – A location on Lake Champlain by Kings Bay.
- Twin Bridges – A location on the western town line at the Great Chazy River.

== Notable people ==
- Jehudi Ashmun, born in Champlain, was a religious leader who promoted the settlement of blacks in Liberia.
- Brainerd Kellogg was a tutor and Professor of Rhetoric and English Literature at Middlebury College in Vermont, and later a professor at the Brooklyn Polytechnic Institute. He published a number of influential education books.
