= Rouses Point, New York =

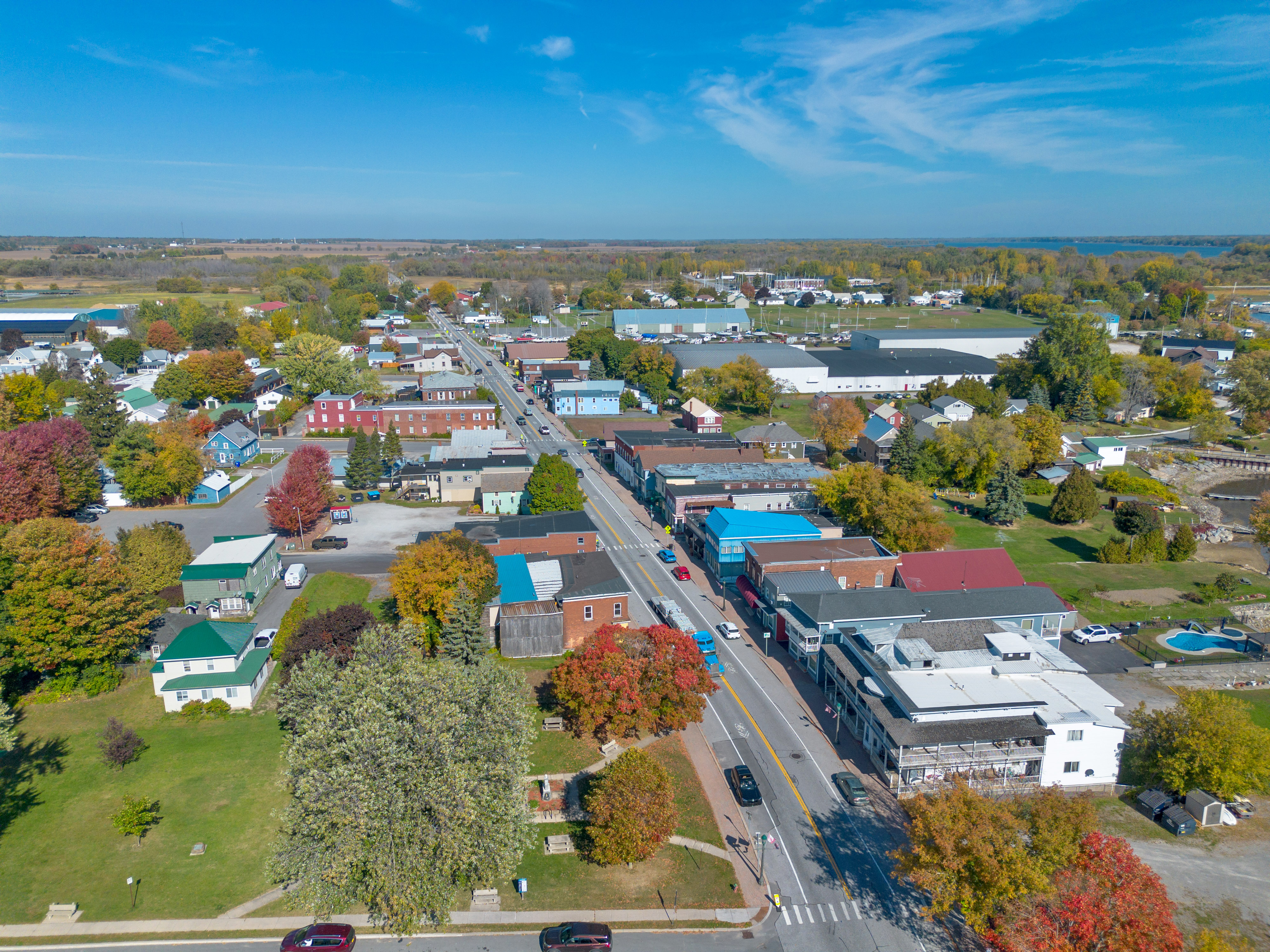
- Rouses Point in 2025

- Location in Clinton County and the state of New York.
- Coordinates: 44°59′15″N 73°22′3″W
- Country: United States
- State: New York
- County: Clinton
- Town: Champlain

Area
  - Total: 2.47 sq mi (6.40 km^{2})
  - Land: 1.75 sq mi (4.53 km^{2})
  - Water: 0.72 sq mi (1.87 km^{2})
- Elevation: 112 ft (34 m)

Population (2020)
  - Total: 2,195
  - Density: 1,254.5/sq mi (484.38/km^{2})
- Time zone: UTC-5 (Eastern (EST))
  - Summer (DST): UTC-4 (EDT)
- ZIP code: 12979
- Area code: 518
- FIPS code: 36-63979
- GNIS feature ID: 0963048
- Website: www.rousespointny.com

Rouses Point is a village in Clinton County, New York, United States, along the 45th parallel. The population was 2,195 at the 2020 census. The village is named after Jacques Rouse, a French Canadian soldier who fought alongside the Americans during their war for independence. The village is on the western shore of Lake Champlain at the source of the Richelieu River. Also located in the northeastern corner of the town of Champlain, it is north of the city of Plattsburgh and is on the Canada–United States border.

== History ==
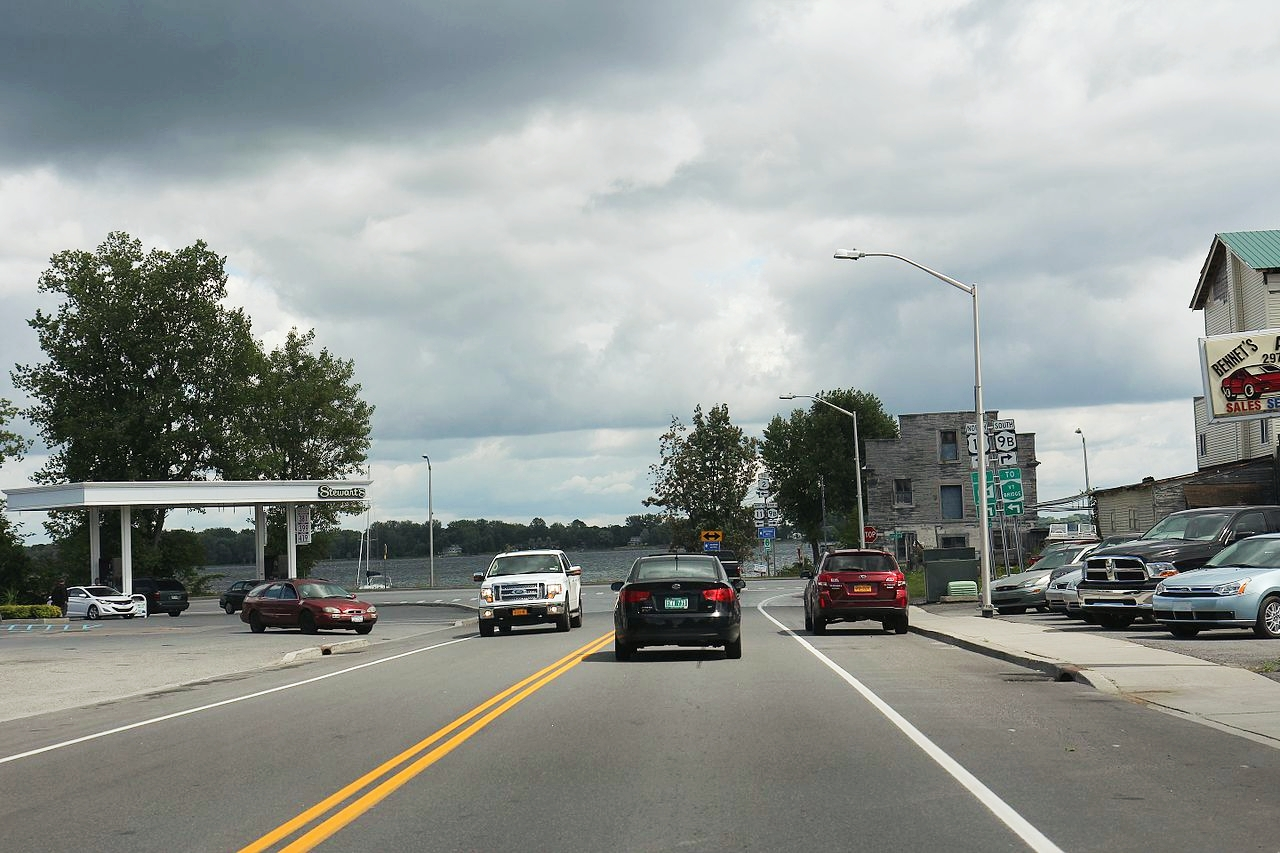
Towards Lake Champlain on Hwy 11

Rouses Point was first settled around 1783 by Canadian and Nova Scotian refugees who were granted land in the Canadian and Nova Scotia Refugee Tract in reward for their services during the American Revolution.

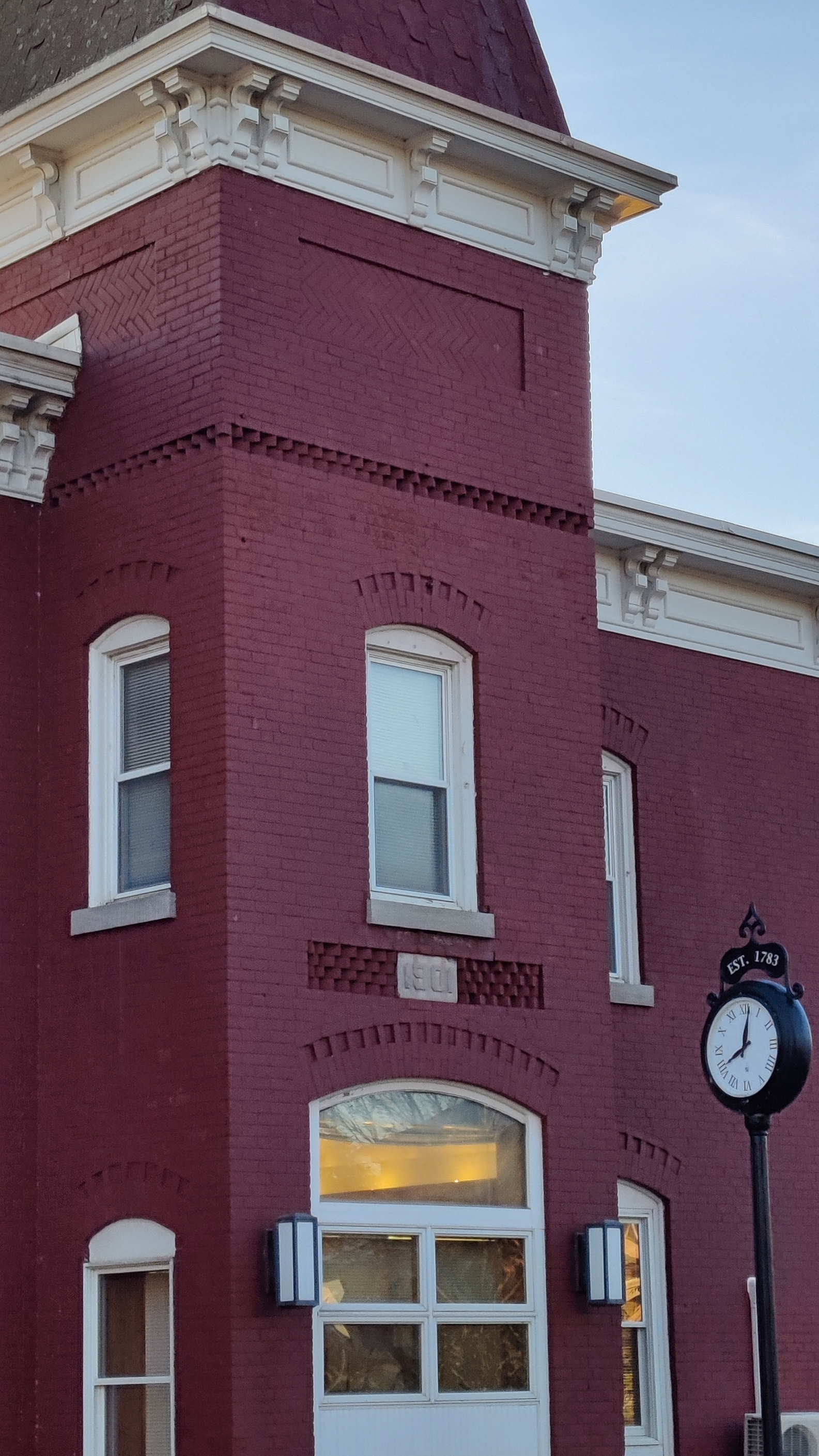
Est. 1783

Steamboats were a booming business on this part of the lake; the second commercial steamboat in the world was launched on Lake Champlain, with Rouses Point as its first port-of-call. Steamboat traffic continued on the lake for the next 100 years until displaced by the railroad. Edward Thurber built the first frame house in 1818. President James Monroe stayed there.

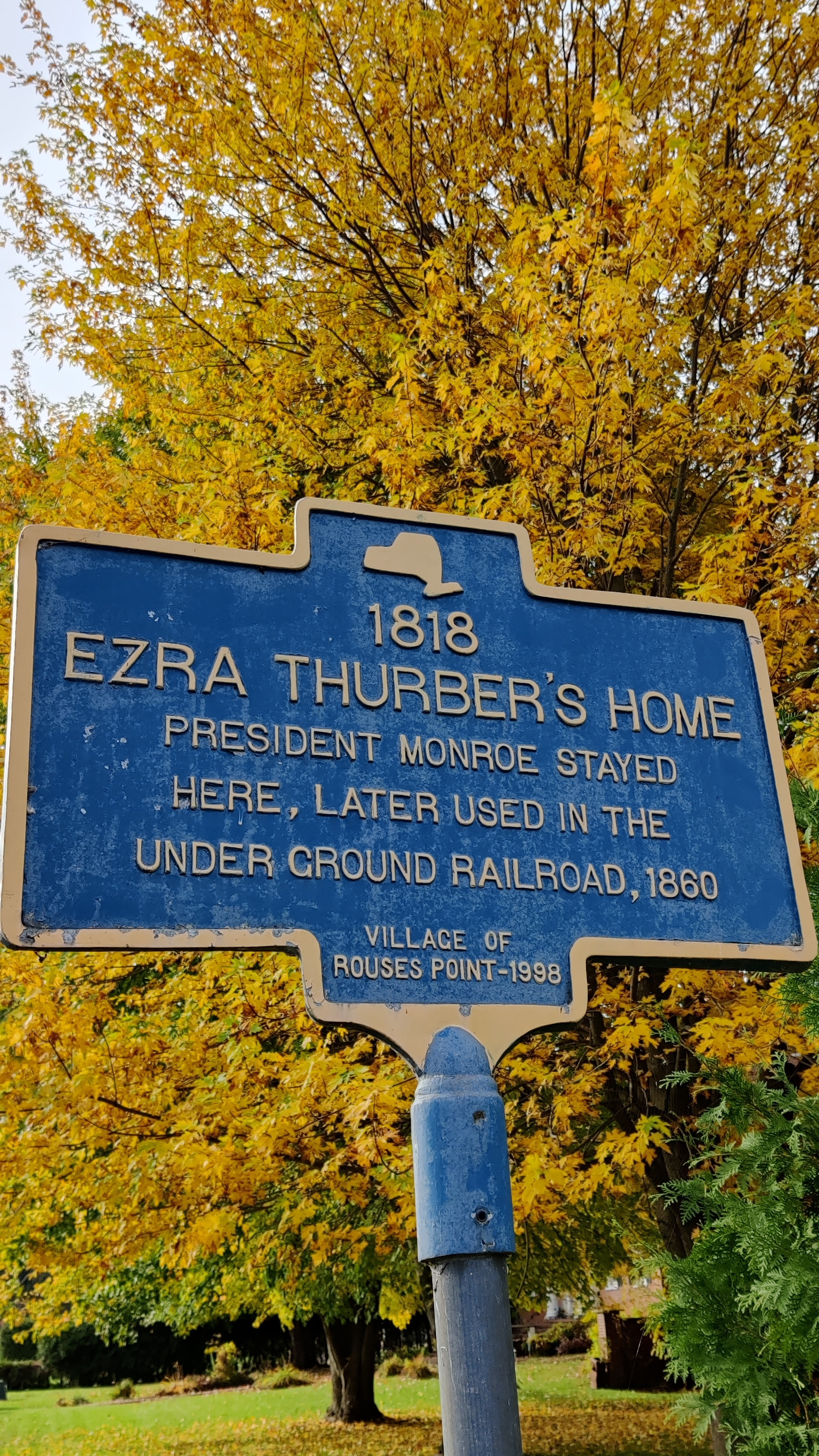
Commemorative Plaque

After an unnamed first fort (sometimes called "Fort Blunder") was mistakenly built 1.2 km north of Island Point in Canada, Fort Montgomery was built here between 1844 and 1871 to guard Lake Champlain against possible invasion from British Canada. The fort was never completed and was briefly garrisoned by the U.S. Army during the American Civil War. In 1816, the first stone house built from "Fort Blunder" was a house of worship for Baptists, Methodists, and Presbyterians. It is still standing as a family home.

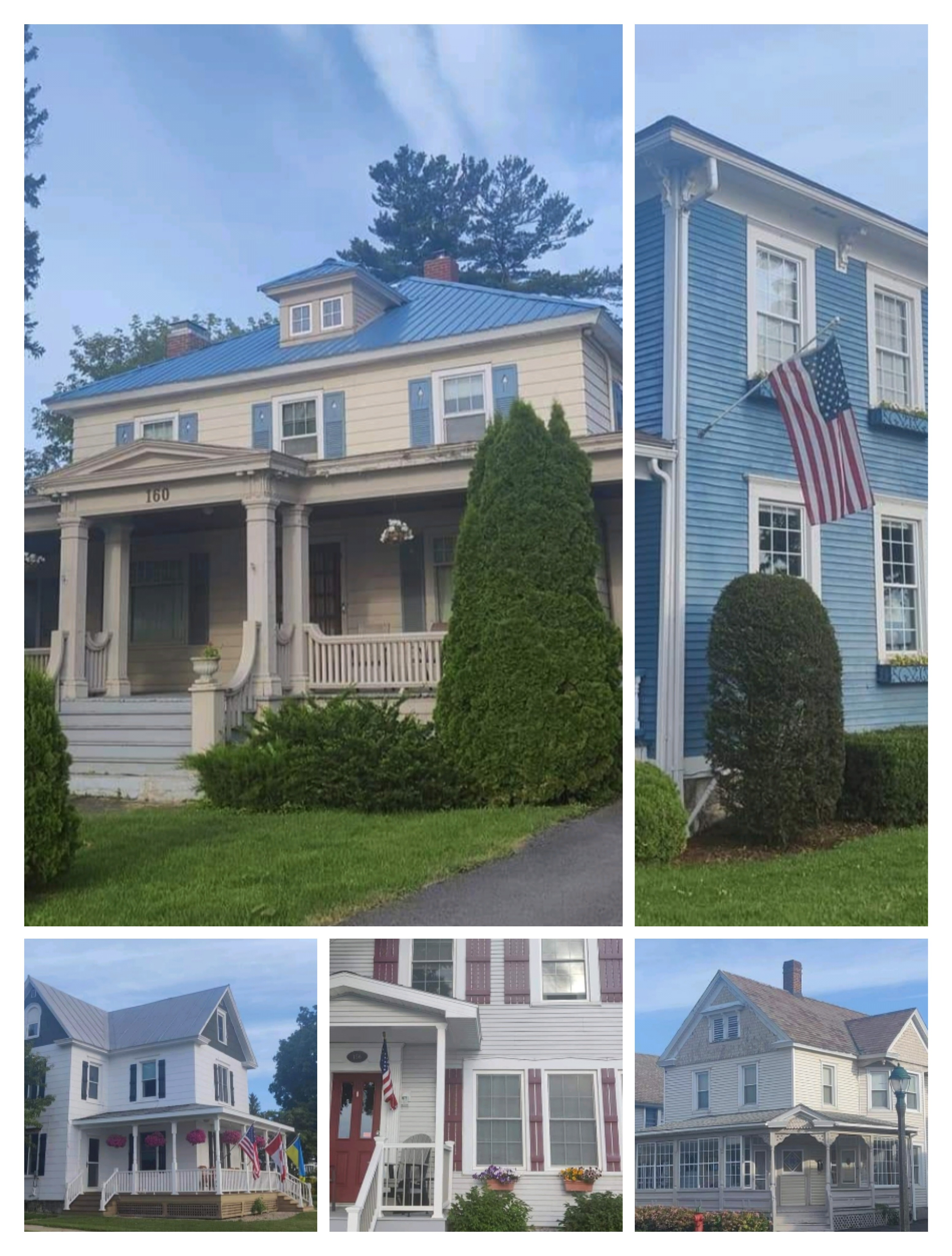
Rouses Point homes

By 1860, Rouses Point had a variety of shops and tradespeople such as loggers, bakers, tailors, carpenters, blacksmiths, prostitutes, and hatters. Its location on the Canada–U.S. border made it an important stop on the Underground Railroad, through which many African American slaves escaped to freedom.

Rouses Point became an incorporated village in 1877, and grew to a population of over 2,000 by 1892. The Delaware and Hudson Railway opened a station, connecting the village to New York City and Montreal. During Prohibition (1923–33), the village's proximity to the Canada–U.S. border made it popular with those who wanted to smuggle illegal alcohol across the border. Rum-running became common, and three speakeasies, one called "The Bucket of Blood", operated nightly. Organized crime visited the area, bringing with it the usual vices.

During World War II, the community was the scene of substantial shipments of war materials to points north by water and rail.

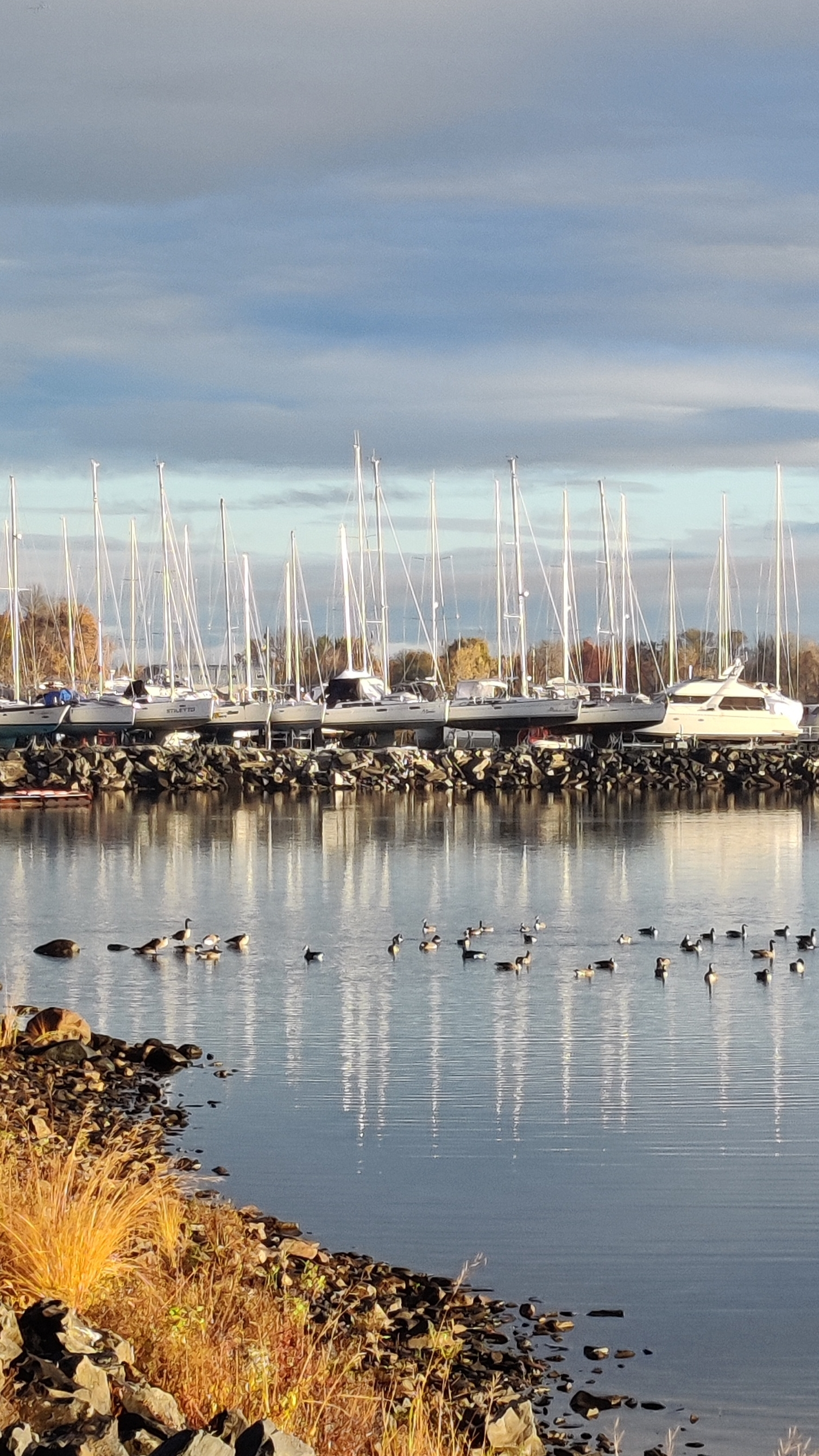
Rouses Point Marina

Wyeth, a pharmaceutical company, formerly employed over 1,000 people.

== Geography ==
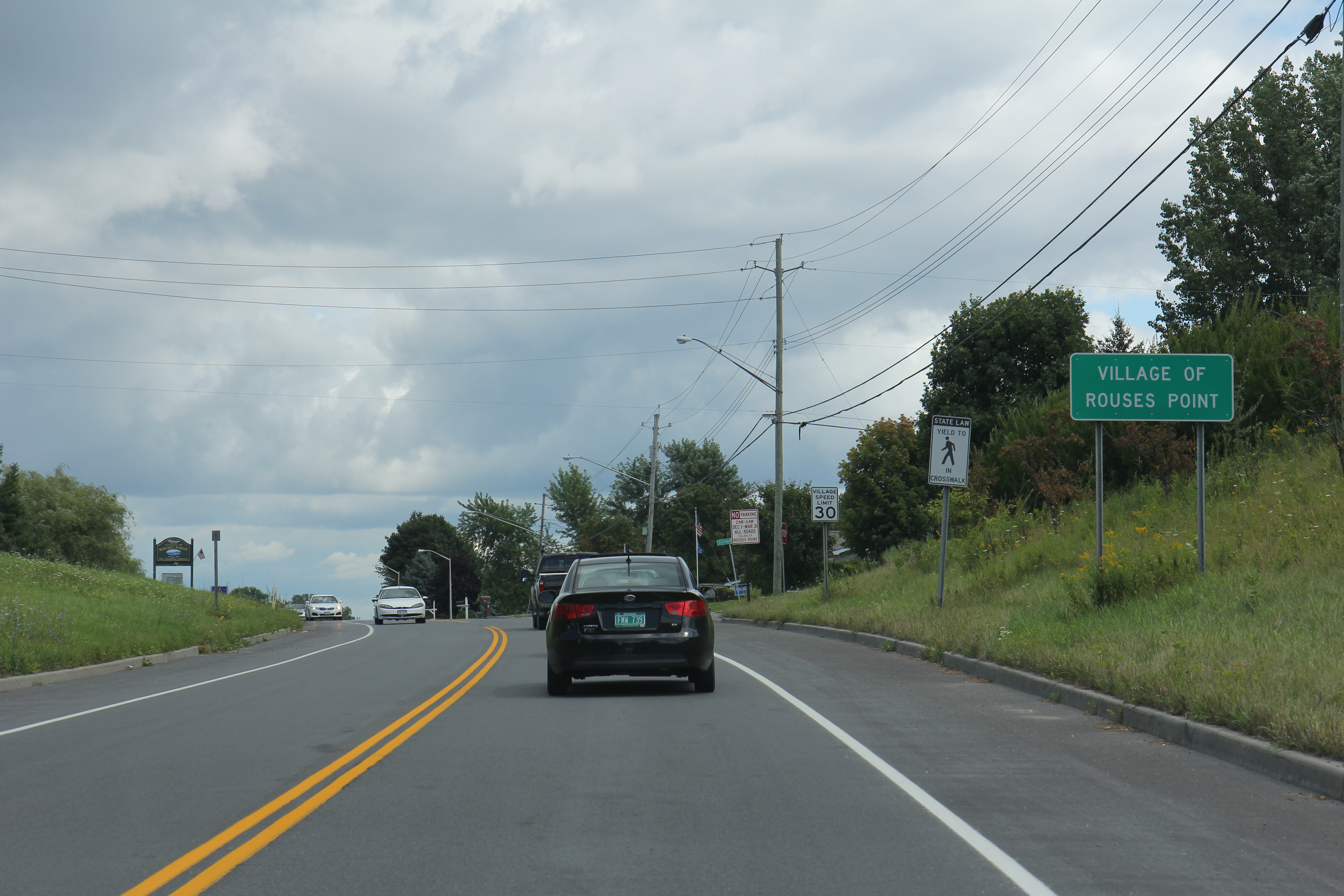
The sign for Rouses Point on U.S. 11

Rouses Point, located at 44°59′15″N 73°22′3″W (44.987531, -73.367634), is the northernmost village in New York in terms of the center of population.

According to the United States Census Bureau, the village has a total area of 2.5 square miles (6.4 km^{2}), of which 1.8 square miles (4.6 km^{2}) is land and 0.73 square miles (1.9 km^{2}), or 29.18%, is water.

The Rouses Point-Lacolle 223 Border Crossing is a port of entry with Quebec at the Canada–United States border. The village is on the western shore of Lake Champlain, by the U.S. Route 2 and U.S. Route 11 intersection. U.S. 2 leads east across the Rouses Point Bridge into Vermont. New York State Route 9B enters the village from the south, and New York State Route 276 enters the village from the northwest.

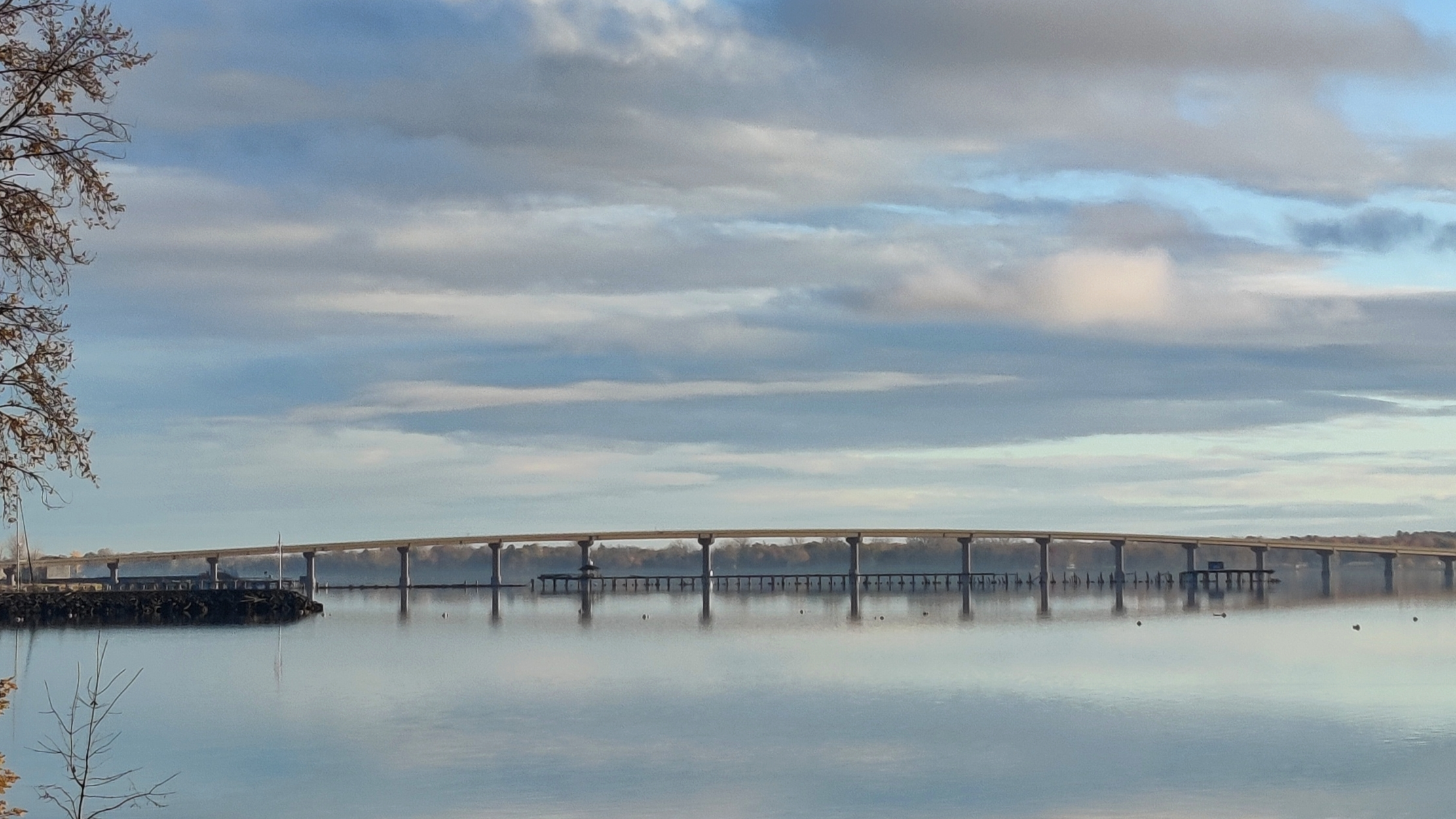
Rouses Point NY to Vermont bridge

The intersection of U.S. 2 and U.S. 11 is the western terminus of the eastern segment of U.S. 2. Approximately 8/10ths of a mile to the north U.S. 11 ends at the Canada–U.S. border.

== Demographics ==
Historical population
Census	Pop.	Note	%±
1870	1,266		—
1880	1,485		17.3%
1890	1,856		25.0%
1900	1,675		−9.8%
1910	1,638		−2.2%
1920	1,700		3.8%
1930	1,920		12.9%
1940	1,846		−3.9%
1950	2,001		8.4%
1960	2,160		7.9%
1970	2,250		4.2%
1980	2,266		0.7%
1990	2,377		4.9%
2000	2,277		−4.2%
2010	2,209		−3.0%
2020	2,195		−0.6%
U.S. Decennial Census

As of the census of 2000, there were 2,277 people, 978 households, and 604 families residing in the village. The population density was 1,281.8 inhabitants per square mile (494.9/km^{2}). There were 1,062 housing units at an average density of 597.8 per square mile (230.8/km^{2}). The racial makeup of the village was 97.19% White, 0.70% African American, 0.40% Native American, 0.44% Asian, 0.04% Pacific Islander, 0.18% from other races, and 1.05% from two or more races. Hispanic or Latino of any race were 1.36% of the population.

There were 978 households, out of which 28.9% had children under the age of 18 living with them, 46.2% were married couples living together, 12.9% had a female householder with no husband present, and 38.2% were non-families. 33.5% of all households were made up of individuals, and 12.8% had someone living alone who was 65 years of age or older. The average household size was 2.26 and the average family size was 2.88.

In the village, the population was spread out, with 23.8% under the age of 18, 6.9% from 18 to 24, 27.6% from 25 to 44, 25.8% from 45 to 64, and 15.8% who were 65 years of age or older. The median age was 39 years. For every 100 females, there were 90.2 males. For every 100 females age 18 and over, there were 84.1 males.

The median income for a household in the village was $39,167, and the median income for a family was $49,931. Males had a median income of $36,250 versus $30,064 for females. The per capita income for the village was $20,539. About 6.8% of families and 9.9% of the population were below the poverty line, including 14.2% of those under age 18 and 4.5% of those age 65 or over.

== Education ==
The village is within the Northeastern Clinton Central School District. There is one elementary school in Rouses Point, housing grades K-5. Students from grades 6-12 attend Northeastern Clinton Central Middle/High School in Champlain.

Dodge Memorial Library is located on Lake Street (Route 9B/U.S. 11).

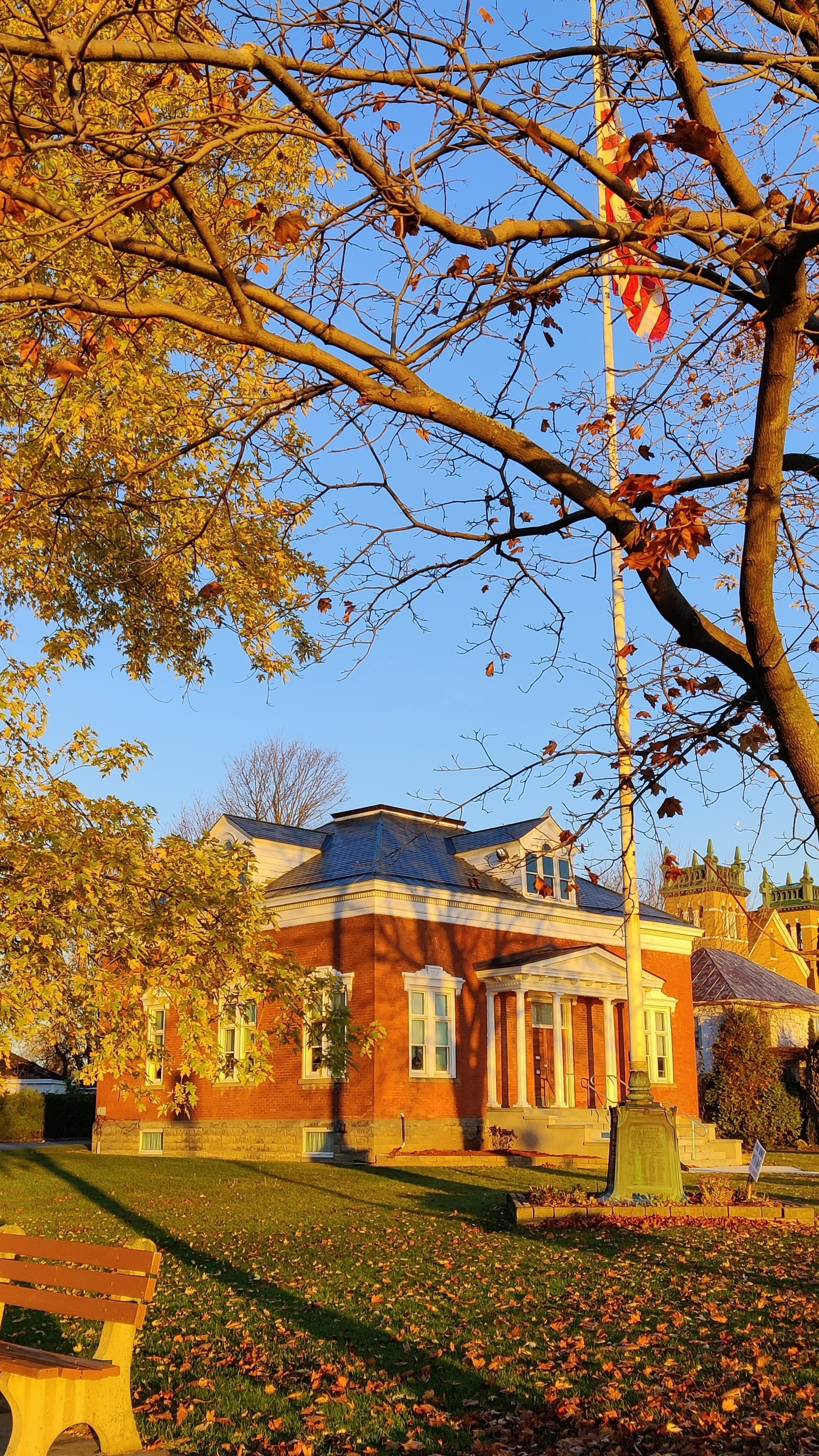
Dodge Memorial Library

== Local information ==
Also found on Lake Street is the Rouses Point Civic Center, which houses village council meetings, an ice rink, and from time to time serves as a small convention floor.

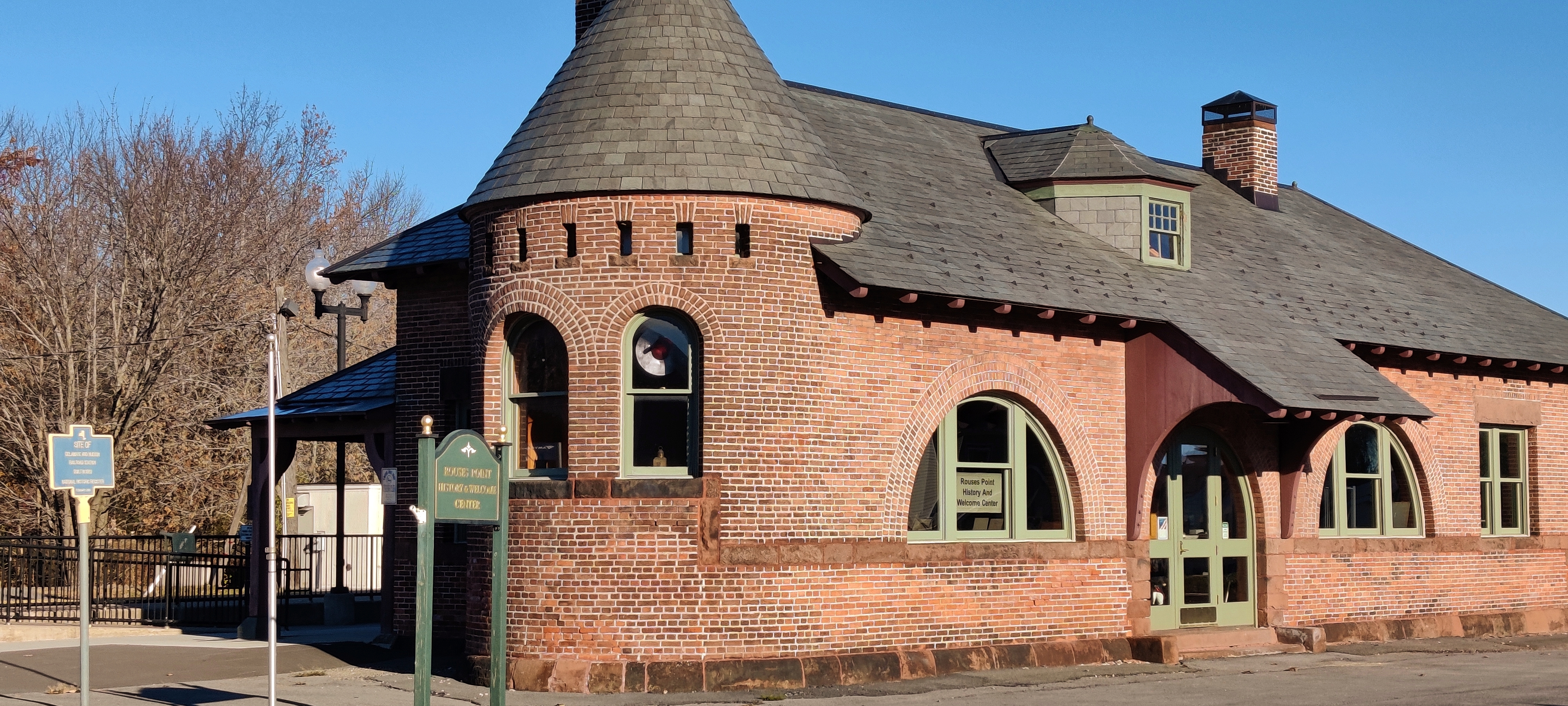
Rouses Point Train Station and Historic Center

== Transportation ==
Amtrak, the U.S. national passenger rail system, provides service to Rouses Point, operating its Adirondack daily in both directions between Montreal and New York City. The Rouses Point station is the closest station on the U.S. side of the international boundary, and U.S. immigration officials board southbound trains at the station for entry formalities.

== In popular culture ==
Rouses Point's Amtrak station plays an important role in the final episode of The Americans, but the scene was not recorded there.

== Sites of interest ==
- Fort Montgomery; also known as "Fort Blunder"

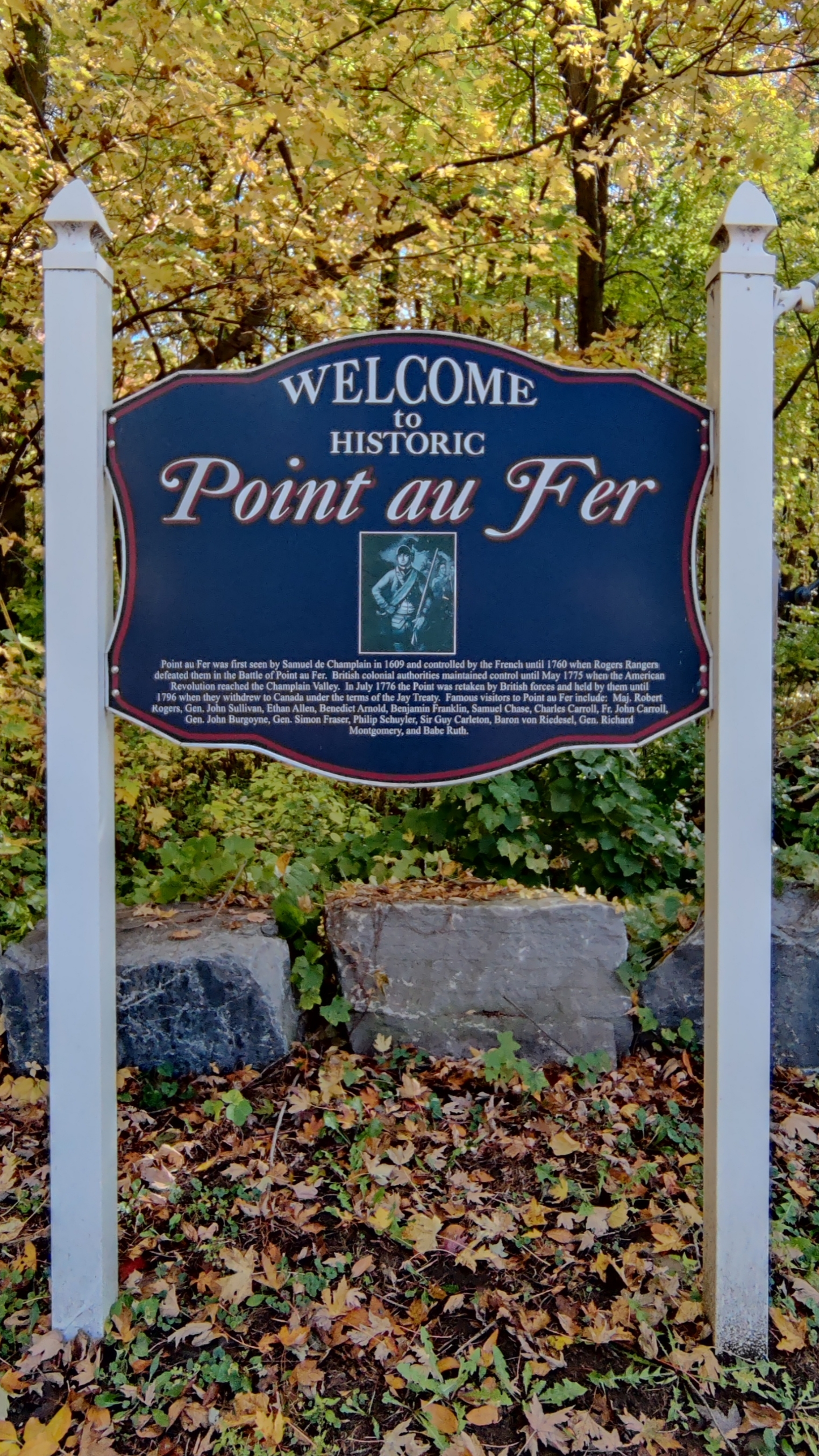
Point au Fer Historical Marker

- Pointe au Fer, discovered by French explorer Samuel de Champlain in 1609, site of an 18th-century battle in 1760 when it became under British control until interrupted in 1775 by the American Revolution and then retaken. Famous visitors have included: Benjamin Franklin, Ethan Allen, Sir Guy Carleton, and Babe Ruth. It's today primarily a conservation area with camping ground overlooking Lake Champlain, as well as a public hunting ground in season.

== Notable people ==
- Elizabeth Marney Conner (1856–1941), dramatic reader and educator
- Jesse Boulerice (born 1978), former NHL player for four teams
