= New York State Route 191 =

Highway in New York

New York State Route 191
- Map of northern Clinton County with NY 191 highlighted in red

Route information
- Maintained by Clinton County
- Length: 6.24 mi (10.04 km)
- Existed: 1930–March 18, 2015

Major junctions
- West end: NY 22 in Chazy
- I-87 in Chazy
- East end: US 9 in Chazy

Location
- Country: United States
- State: New York
- Counties: Clinton

Highway system
- New York Highways; Interstate; US; State; Reference; Parkways
← NY 190	→ NY 192

New York State Route 191 (NY 191) was a 6.24-mile (10.04 km) long state highway located north of Adirondack Park. The route was maintained and co-designated by the Clinton County highway department as County Route 23 (CR 23) and headed from an intersection with NY 22 in the hamlet of Sciota within the town of Chazy to a junction with U.S. Route 9 (US 9) in the hamlet of Chazy. The route met Interstate 87 (I-87, also known as the Adirondack Northway) west of Chazy hamlet.

NY 191 was assigned as part of the 1930 renumbering of state highways in New York. The route initially extended from the community of Altona to a ferry landing on Lake Champlain in Chazy Landing, where it connected to Vermont Route F-2. The ferry ceased to operate in 1937, but NY 191 remained unchanged until 1980 when ownership and maintenance of NY 191 was transferred from the state to Clinton County. NY 191 was truncated to have the west end at NY 22 following the maintenance swap. The route was decommissioned on March 18, 2015.

== Route description ==
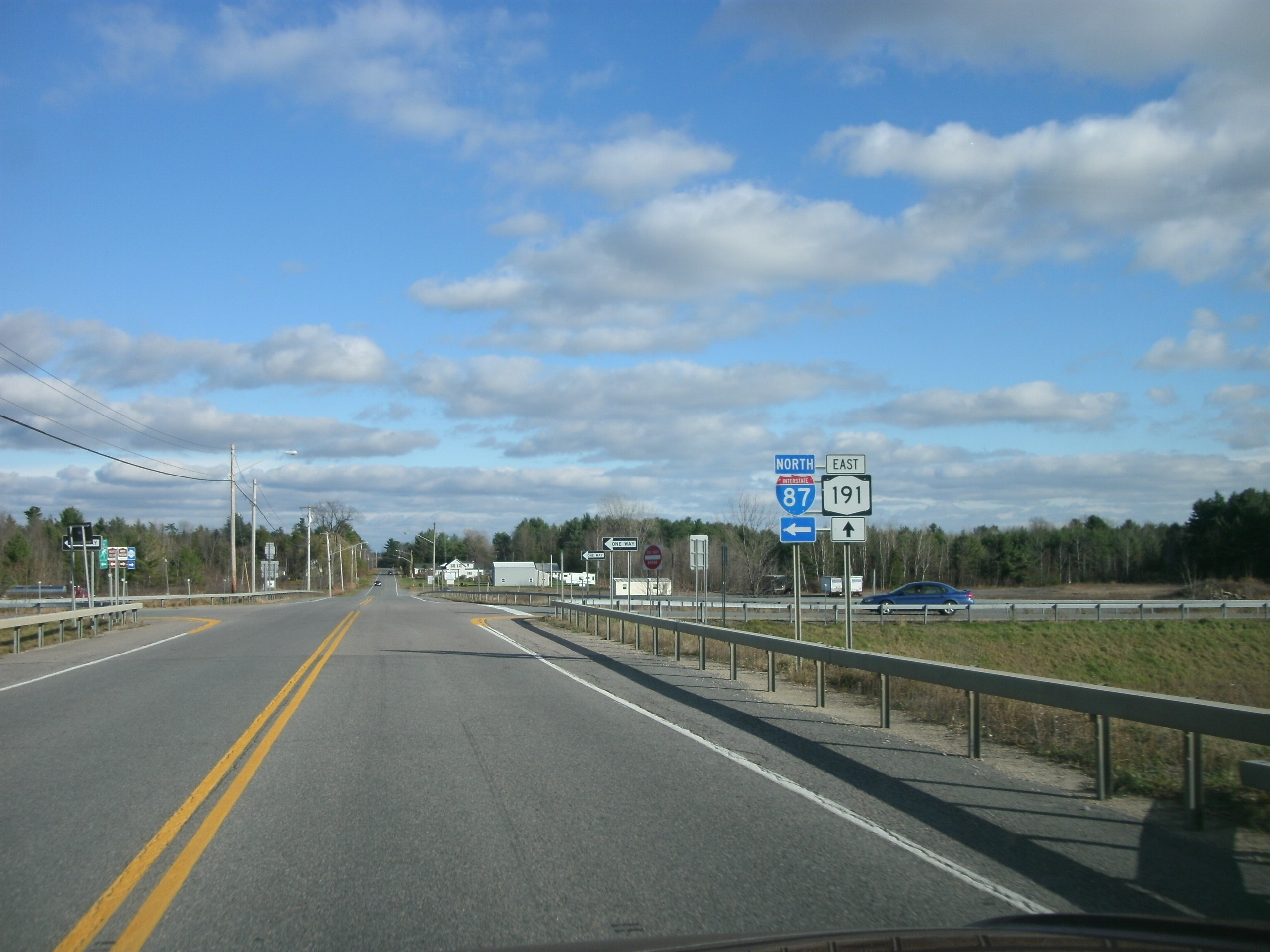
2010 photo of NY 191 eastbound at I-87 near the hamlet of Chazy

NY 191 began at an intersection with NY 22 and Miner Farm Road (CR 23) in the Clinton County hamlet of Sciota, located within the town of Chazy. The route headed to the northeast as a two-lane county-maintained, state-numbered highway, overlapping with CR 23 and taking on the Miner Farm Road name. East of Sciota, the highway traversed lightly developed areas, serving several residences separated by patches of woodlands. The route eventually began to turn to the southeast, connecting with Angelville Road (unsigned CR 20) in the process. A long stretch of dense forests followed the turn, with little to no development along the highway.

After 2 miles (3.2 km), the road bent back to the east, leaving the woodlands behind as it passed south of the Miner Institute. The research complex led to another stretch of isolated homes along NY 191, centered on the route's interchange with the Adirondack Northway (I-87). Not far from the junction, NY 191 entered the hamlet of Chazy, a small community located on the Little Chazy River. The route bypassed most of Chazy, skirting the northern edge of the hamlet as it headed northeast to a junction with US 9. NY 191 ended here while CR 23 follows the state-maintained US 9 south into downtown Chazy.

== History ==
Modern NY 191 is one part of a mostly continuous east–west highway between the hamlets of Altona and Chazy Landing. On September 23, 1908, the state assumed maintenance of the part east of the hamlet of Chazy following the completion of a $38,925 project (equivalent to $1,362,231 in 2024) to improve a total of 4.60 miles (7.40 km) of roads in Clinton County. The section west of the hamlet of Sciota cost $75,711 (equivalent to $1,582,728 in 2024) to rebuild to state highway standards, and it became a state highway on December 12, 1918. From Sciota to Chazy, the road was locally maintained until the late 1920s.

In the 1930 renumbering of state highways in New York, hundreds of state-maintained highways without a posted route number were given a signed designation for the first time. The Altona–Chazy Landing state highway was designated as NY 191. At its east end, the route connected to Vermont Route F-2 on Isle La Motte by way of a ferry across part of Lake Champlain. The ferry was discontinued in 1937; however, the endpoints of NY 191 remained unchanged. On April 1, 1980, ownership and maintenance of all of NY 191 was transferred from the state of New York to Clinton County as part of a highway maintenance swap between the two levels of government. The entirety of the highway was designated as CR 23 by Clinton County and NY 191 was truncated to consist only of the portion of the route between Sciota and Chazy. The route was decommissioned on March 18, 2015.

== Major intersections ==
The entire route was in Chazy, Clinton County.

mi	km	Destinations	Notes
0.00	0.00	NY 22 – West Chazy, Mooers	Western terminus; hamlet of Sciota
5.23	8.42	I-87	Exit 41 (I-87)
6.24	10.04	US 9 – Plattsburgh, Champlain	Eastern terminus; hamlet of Chazy
1.000 mi = 1.609 km; 1.000 km = 0.621 mi

== See also ==
- List of county routes in Clinton County, New York
