= Altona, New York =

- Town
- Location in Clinton County and the state of New York.

- Location of New York in the United States
- Coordinates: 44°53′29″N 73°39′21″W
- Country: United States
- State: New York
- County: Clinton County
- Incorporated: 1857

Government
  - Mayor: Larry Ross (D) Town Council: Ronnie LaBarge (R); Leslie LaBarge (D); Jeanne M. Bushey (); Joey M. Snide ()

Area
  - Total: 101.34 sq mi (262.46 km^{2})
  - Land: 100.98 sq mi (261.54 km^{2})
  - Water: 0.36 sq mi (0.92 km^{2})
- Elevation: 915 ft (279 m)

Population (2010)
  - Total: 2,887
  - Estimate (2016): 2,890
  - Density: 28.6/sq mi (11.05/km^{2})
- Time zone: UTC-5 (EST)
  - Summer (DST): UTC-4 (EDT)
- ZIP Codes: 12910 (Altona); 12935 (Ellenburg Depot); 12958 (Mooers); 12992 (West Chazy)
- Area code: 518
- FIPS code: 36-019-01583
- Website: townaltonany.gov

Altona is a town in Clinton County, New York, United States. The population was 2,666 at the 2020 census. The town was named after the Altona, Hamburg, district of Germany (which was an independent Danish, later Prussian town at the time of foundation of Altona, NY). The town contains a hamlet also called Altona.

The town is located in north-central Clinton County. The western part is inside the Adirondack Park boundary, but the entire town is specifically excluded from the park by statute. Altona is northwest of Plattsburgh.

== History ==
The area was home to various cultures of indigenous peoples for thousands of years. Archaeological studies have found that by 1300 CE, the St. Lawrence Iroquoians, a distinct group who spoke the Laurentian language, built fortified villages similar to those visited and described by explorer Jacques Cartier in the mid-16th century. They are believed to have been pushed out and defeated later in that century by the Mohawk, one of the Five Nations of the Iroquois Confederacy.

The first European-American settler arrived circa 1800, after the American Revolution, when New York attracted migrants from New England. In 1857, the town was formed from part of the Town of Chazy. The early economy was based on natural resources: mining, logging, and tanning.

== Geography ==
According to the United States Census Bureau, the town has a total area of 101.4 square miles (262.5 km^{2}), of which 101.0 square miles (261.5 km^{2}) is land and 0.35 square miles (0.9 km^{2}), or 0.35%, is water. Most of the town is drained by the Great Chazy River, while the southeastern section is drained by the Little Chazy River and Corbeau Creek. All of the water bodies flow eventually to Lake Champlain.

New York State Route 190 (Military Turnpike) is a northwest–southeast highway in the town. U.S. Route 11 crosses the northwestern corner of Altona.

== Demographics ==
Historical population
Census	Pop.	Note	%±
1860	1,665		—
1870	2,759		65.7%
1880	3,570		29.4%
1890	2,368		−33.7%
1900	2,465		4.1%
1910	2,383		−3.3%
1920	1,911		−19.8%
1930	1,834		−4.0%
1940	2,026		10.5%
1950	1,711		−15.5%
1960	1,750		2.3%
1970	1,852		5.8%
1980	2,077		12.1%
1990	2,775		33.6%
2000	3,164		14.0%
2010	2,887		−8.8%
2020	2,666		−7.7%
2023 (est.)	2,527	▼	−5.2%
U.S. Decennial Census

As of the census of 2000, there were 3,160 people, 888 households, and 653 families residing in the town. The population density was 31.3 inhabitants per square mile (12.1/km^{2}). There were 1,007 housing units at an average density of 10.0 per square mile (3.9/km^{2}). The racial makeup of the town was 82.50% White, 11.96% Black or African American, 0.35% Native American, 0.13% Asian, 4.75% from other races, and 0.32% from two or more races. Hispanics or Latinos of any race were 8.10% of the population.

There were 888 households, out of which 38.3% had children under the age of 18 living with them, 59.7% were married couples living together, 8.4% had a female householder with no husband present, and 26.4% were non-families. 19.5% of all households were made up of individuals, and 7.5% had someone living alone who was 65 years of age or older. The average household size was 2.73 and the average family size was 3.12.

The age distribution was 21.9% under the age of 18, 9.2% from 18 to 24, 41.1% from 25 to 44, 19.9% from 45 to 64, and 7.9% who were 65 years of age or older. The median age was 35 years. For every 100 females, there were 161.6 males. For every 100 females age 18 and over, there were 184.1 males.

The median income for a household in the town was $37,500, and the median income for a family was $41,442. Males had a median income of $31,217 versus $25,491 for females. The per capita income for the town was $15,312. About 8.6% of families and 12.6% of the population were below the poverty line, including 13.7% of those under age 18 and 25.7% of those age 65 or over.

== Communities and locations ==
- Alder Bend – A hamlet in the western part of the town, within the Adirondack Park.
- Altona – The hamlet of Altona is in the northern part of the town.
- Altona Correctional Facility – A New York medium security prison, built around a former high school that was given over in 1983. It is located within Altona hamlet, north of the hamlet center.
- Crowley Corners – A hamlet, on NY-190, southwest of Altona hamlet.
- Dannemora Crossing – A hamlet at the western town line.
- Forest – A hamlet in the northwestern part of the town, west of Irona.
- Ganienkeh – A Mohawk settlement obtained in an agreement with New York State in the 1970s after the occupation of Moss Lake.
- Irona – A hamlet near the northern town line, northwest of Altona hamlet.
- Jericho – A hamlet near the southern border of the town.
- Miner Lake – A lake near the geographic center of the town, southwest of Altona hamlet.
- Miner Lake State Park – a park surrounding Miner Lake.
- Purdys Mills – A hamlet in the southern part of the town.
- Robinson – A hamlet in the southeastern part of the town.
