= New York State Route 456 =

State highway in Clinton County, New York, US

New York State Route 456
- Map of Clinton County in northeastern New York with NY 456 highlighted in red

Route information
- Maintained by Clinton County
- Length: 3.24 mi (5.21 km)
- Existed: April 1970–March 18, 2015

Major junctions
- West end: NY 22 in Beekmantown
- I-87 in Beekmantown
- East end: US 9 in Beekmantown

Location
- Country: United States
- State: New York
- Counties: Clinton

Highway system
- New York Highways; Interstate; US; State; Reference; Parkways
← NY 454	→ NY 458

New York State Route 456 (NY 456) was a short state highway located entirely within the town of Beekmantown in Clinton County, New York, in the United States. The western terminus of the route was at an intersection with NY 22 by the community of Beekmantown (also called Beekmantown Corners) and the eastern terminus was at a junction with U.S. Route 9 (US 9) east of Interstate 87 (I-87) and west of Point Au Roche State Park. NY 456 was assigned in April 1970 and is maintained by the Clinton County Highway Department as County Route 58 (CR 58). The route was decommissioned on March 18, 2015.

== Route description ==
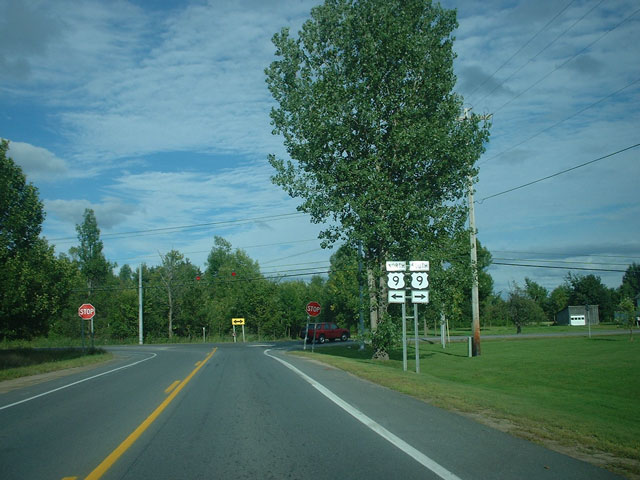
NY 456 eastbound at the junction with US 9 in Beekmantown

NY 456 began at an intersection with NY 22 in the town of Beekmantown. Maintained by the county as CR 58 and known locally as Spellman Road, NY 456 proceeded east through a residential section of Beekmantown and past the Cumberland Head Library. Just after crossing the junction with Ashley Road, the route crossed over tracks owned by the Canadian Pacific Railway and used by Amtrak on its Adirondack service. Remaining a two-lane residential road through Beekmantown, NY 456 continued past a junction with Ron-Cathy Road and into an interchange with the Adirondack Northway (I-87) (exit 40). Two blocks after the interchange with the Northway, NY 456 reached a junction with US 9 just northwest of Point Au Roche State Park.

== History ==
NY 456 was assigned in April 1970 to its current alignment. Although the route was signed as a state highway, it was maintained by Clinton County since its inception. The route was originally concurrent with the unsigned CR 32; however, it is now inventoried by the county as CR 58. The route was decommissioned on March 18, 2015, and removed from the state logs.

== Major intersections ==
The entire route was in Beekmantown, Clinton County.

mi	km	Destinations	Notes
0.00	0.00	NY 22 – Plattsburgh, West Chazy	Western terminus; hamlet of Beekmantown
2.69	4.33	I-87	Exit 40 (I-87)
3.24	5.21	US 9 – Chazy, Point Au Roche, Plattsburgh	Eastern terminus
1.000 mi = 1.609 km; 1.000 km = 0.621 mi

== See also ==
- List of county routes in Clinton County, New York
