= Mooers =

Mooers may refer to:

== People ==
- Benjamin Mooers (1758–1838), American general from the American Revolution and New York state legislator
- Calvin Mooers (1919–1994), American computer scientist known for his work in information retrieval and for the programming language TRAC
- Doug Mooers (born 1947), American football player

== Places ==
- Mooers, New York, a town named after Benjamin Mooers
- Mooers (CDP), New York, a hamlet and census-designated place in the town
