= Chazy, New York =

- Town
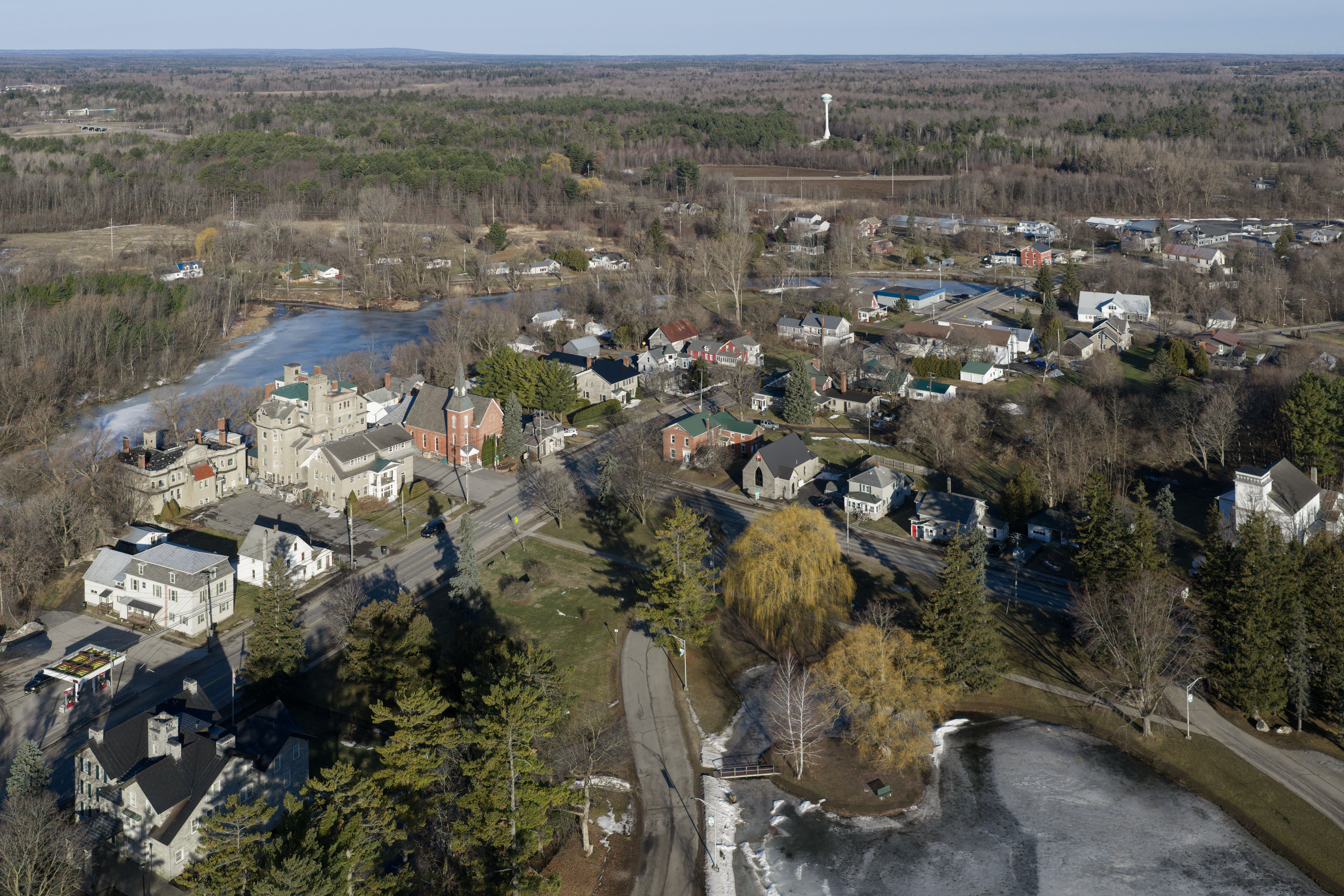

- Location in Clinton County and the state of New York.
- Coordinates: 44°51′29″N 73°27′46″W
- Country: United States
- State: New York
- County: Clinton

Government
  - Type: Town Council
  - Town Supervisor: Daniel Vesco (R)
  - Town Council: Members' List: • Willie Giroux (R); • Cathy A. Devins (R); • Vacant; • Jerry J. Deno (D)

Area
  - Total: 61.32 sq mi (158.81 km^{2})
  - Land: 54.15 sq mi (140.26 km^{2})
  - Water: 7.16 sq mi (18.55 km^{2})
- Elevation: 190 ft (58 m)

Population (2010)
  - Total: 4,284
  - Estimate (2016): 4,196
  - Density: 77.5/sq mi (29.92/km^{2})
- Time zone: UTC-5 (Eastern (EST))
  - Summer (DST): UTC-4 (EDT)
- ZIP Codes: 12921 (Chazy); 12992 (West Chazy); 12910 (Altona); 12958 (Mooers)
- Area code: 518
- FIPS code: 36-019-14113
- GNIS feature ID: 0978816
- Website: townofchazyny.gov

Chazy /ʃeɪˈzi/ is a town in northeastern Clinton County, New York, United States. The population was 4,096 at the 2020 census. The closest city is Plattsburgh, 14 miles (23 km) to the south. Chazy is 8 miles (13 km) south of the Canada–United States border. The ZIP code is 12921 and the community is in area code 518.

== History ==
The region was explored by Samuel de Champlain, the French explorer and navigator who mapped large portions of northeastern North America, in 1609. The town was first settled around 1763 by Jean Laframboise, who is also credited with introducing apple growing to the area. Chazy is named after French Lieutenant de Chézy of the Carignan-Salières Regiment, who was killed by the Iroquois in 1666.

Chazy was formed from the town of Champlain in 1804; in 1857, part of the town was used to form the town of Altona.

== Geography ==
According to the United States Census Bureau, the town of Chazy has a total area of 61.3 square miles (158.8 km^{2}), of which 54.2 square miles (140.3 km^{2}) is land and 7.2 square miles (18.6 km^{2}), or 11.68%, is water.

The eastern boundary of the town, in the center of the western channel of Lake Champlain, is the state border with Vermont. The Little Chazy River enters Lake Champlain north of Chazy Landing.

The Adirondack Northway (Interstate 87) and U.S. Route 9 are north–south highways through the town. New York State Route 191 is an east–west highway entirely within the town. NY 22 is a north–south highway in the western part of Chazy.

== Geology ==
The town gave its name to the mid-Ordovician Chazy Formation, the first true reef system, which was originally identified from limestone outcroppings in the township.

== Demographics ==
Historical population
Census	Pop.	Note	%±
1820	2,313		—
1830	3,097		33.9%
1840	3,584		15.7%
1850	4,324		20.6%
1860	3,399		−21.4%
1870	3,206		−5.7%
1880	3,147		−1.8%
1890	2,867		−8.9%
1900	2,796		−2.5%
1910	2,973		6.3%
1920	2,607		−12.3%
1930	2,916		11.9%
1940	2,813		−3.5%
1950	2,741		−2.6%
1960	3,386		23.5%
1970	3,393		0.2%
1980	3,766		11.0%
1990	3,890		3.3%
2000	4,179		7.4%
2010	4,284		2.5%
2016 (est.)	4,196	▼	−2.1%
U.S. Decennial Census

As of the census of 2000, there were 4,181 people, 1,566 households, and 1,171 families residing in the town. The population density was 77.2 inhabitants per square mile (29.8/km^{2}). There were 1,841 housing units at an average density of 34.0 per square mile (13.1/km^{2}). The racial makeup of the town was 97.94% White, 0.31% African American, 0.41% Native American, 0.50% Asian, 0.10% from other races, and 0.74% from two or more races. Hispanic or Latino of any race were 0.69% of the population.

There were 1,566 households, out of which 36.4% had children under the age of 18 living with them, 62.1% were married couples living together, 8.0% had a female householder with no husband present, and 25.2% were non-families. 19.1% of all households were made up of individuals, and 8.2% had someone living alone who was 65 years of age or older. The average household size was 2.64 and the average family size was 3.00.

In the town, the population was spread out, with 26.7% under the age of 18, 7.5% from 18 to 24, 31.3% from 25 to 44, 23.1% from 45 to 64, and 11.4% who were 65 years of age or older. The median age was 37 years. For every 100 women there were 97.2 men. For every 100 women age 18 and over, there were 95.6 men.

The median income for a household in the town was $41,504, and the median income for a family was $47,589. Males had a median income of $32,825 versus $28,542 for females. The per capita income for the town was $18,125. About 8.0% of families and 10.0% of the population were below the poverty line, including 12.1% of those under age 18 and 5.4% of those age 65 or over.

== Education ==
The census-designated place is within the Chazy Union Free School District. Chazy is home to Chazy Central Rural School and to the William H. Miner Agricultural Research Institute. Miner Institute's campus is also home to William Miner's preserved One Room Schoolhouse.

Chazy Central Rural School was opened on November 14, 1916, as a consolidation of eleven rural schools in the area. William H. Miner, a wealthy railroad industrialist, and philanthropist, donated $2,000,000 to build the school. It consisted of an elementary school program, a high school program, as well as departments of agriculture, industrial arts, household arts, library, drawing, music, and physical training. The children had access to expert medical and dental services free of charge. The old school was five stories high surrounding a bell tower of 71 feet (22 m) and contained two gymnasiums and two swimming pools, as well as an auditorium capable of seating 1,100 people. The school was deemed too costly to upgrade in the early 1960s. A modern two-story school building was built around it and opened in December 1968.

Chazy Central Rural School has four soccer fields which host youth, men's and women's leagues. The boys' varsity soccer team has won ten New York State Public High School Athletic Association state championships (2004, 2005, 2007, 2009, 2010, 2012, 2013, 2017, 2018, and 2023). Including 4 back-to-back championships (2004–2005, 2009–2010, 2012–2013, and most recently 2017–2018). The girls' varsity soccer team has won three state championships, in 2007, 2010, and 2011. The school built its own soccer stadium, which opened in the fall of 2005 and is named after George Brendler, a former gym teacher and athletics coach at the school. The school's baseball and softball fields also host several youth leagues as well as a fireman's softball league. In 2011, the boys' varsity baseball team won its first sectional championship in school history. The school also has a large public playground and a pond.

== Worship ==
Chazy has two congregations, Sacred Heart Roman Catholic Church and Chazy Presbyterian Church.

== Recreation ==
Chazy has a recreation park located on North Farm Road. This piece of land is home to four baseball/softball fields, multiple soccer fields, a small playground, and two covered pavilions. The park hosts events such as an annual kids' soccer jamboree and the annual Happy Pike fishing tournament.

The Scotts Memorial Rink is located on McAdam Road. This hockey rink was completed using a $75,000 grant funded by the NHLPA Goals and Dreams program. The arena is home to the Chazy Youth Hockey Flyers. The Beekmantown Eagles girls' varsity high school ice hockey team also practices and hosts games at this venue. The arena is named in memory of Scott House and Scott Wolter, both of whom played hockey for Chazy and were killed in separate car accidents.

Lake Alice, a small lake located adjacent to Miner Institute, is named after William Miner's wife. The Lake Alice wildlife management area consists of 1,468 acres (594 ha) along Duprey Road in the town. The area is used for hiking, snowshoeing, cross country skiing, fishing and bird watching. The Department of Environmental Conservation manages the area for recreational and scientific purposes.

The Alice T. Miner Colonial Collection is an 1824 classic Colonial Revival house museum with period furnishings.

== Communities and locations in the town of Chazy ==
- Chazy – The hamlet of Chazy is located at the intersection of US 9 and NY 191, east of NY 191's interchange with I-87.
- Chazy Landing – A hamlet on the shore of Lake Champlain, south of the Little Chazy River.
- Dunn Bay – A bay of Lake Champlain, north of Minnetoska Point.
- Ingraham – A hamlet at the southern town line on US 9.
- Long Point – A location on the shore of Lake Champlain in the northeastern corner of Chazy.
- Minnetoska Point – A location on the shore of Lake Champlain.
- Monty Bay – A bay of Lake Champlain south of Minnetoska Point.
- Sciota – A hamlet in the northwestern part of the town at the intersection of NY 22 and NY 191.
- Trombly Bay – A bay of Lake Champlain south of Chazy Landing.
- West Chazy – A hamlet in the southwestern part of the town at the intersection of NY 22 and former NY 348.
- Wool Point – A location on the shore of Lake Champlain, north of Dunn Bay.
