= New York State Route 22 =

State highway in New York, US

New York State Route 22
- NY 22 highlighted in red

Route information
- Maintained by NYSDOT, NYCDOT, Clinton County, Westchester County, and the cities of Mount Vernon and Plattsburgh
- Length: 337.26 mi (542.77 km)
- Existed: 1924–present
- Tourist routes: Lakes to Locks Passage (from Whitehall to Keeseville)

Major junctions
- South end: US 1 in The Bronx
- Cross County Parkway in Mount Vernon; I-287 in White Plains; Bronx River Parkway / Taconic State Parkway in North Castle; I-684 in Armonk; I-84 / I-684 / US 6 / US 202 in Southeast; US 44 / NY 343 in Amenia; I-90 Toll / Berkshire Connector in Canaan; US 20 in New Lebanon; US 4 in Whitehall; I-87 in Chesterfield
- North end: US 11 in Mooers

Location
- Country: United States
- State: New York
- Counties: Bronx, Westchester, Putnam, Dutchess, Columbia, Rensselaer, Washington, Essex, Clinton

Highway system
- New York Highways; Interstate; US; State; Reference; Parkways
← NY 21A	→ NY 22A

New York State Route 22 (NY 22) is a north–south state highway that parallels the eastern border of the U.S. state of New York, from the outskirts of New York City to the hamlet of Mooers in Clinton County near the Canadian border. At 337 miles (542 km), it is the state's longest north–south route and the third longest state route overall, after NY 5 and NY 17. (Note: NY 5 is 371 miles (597 km) long; and NY 17 397 miles (639 km). When the latter is fully converted to I-86, NY 22 will replace it as the second longest state route.) Many of the state's major east–west roads intersect with, and often join, NY 22 just before crossing into the neighboring New England states, where U.S. Route 7 (US 7), which originally partially followed NY 22's alignment, similarly parallels the New York state line.

Almost all of NY 22 is a two-lane rural road through small villages and hamlets. The exceptions are its southern end in the heavily populated Bronx and lower Westchester County, and a section that runs through the city of Plattsburgh near the northern end. The rural landscape that the road passes through varies from horse country and views of the reservoirs of the New York City watershed in the northern suburbs of the city, to dairy farms further upstate in the Taconic and Berkshire mountains, to the undeveloped, heavily forested Adirondack Park along the shores of Lake Champlain. An 86-mile (138 km) section from Fort Ann to Keeseville is part of the All-American Road known as the Lakes to Locks Passage.

The oldest portions of today's NY 22, in Westchester County and along the Lake Champlain shoreline, were Native American trails. Dutch, and after them English, settlers continued to use the road to get their farm products to market, with the southernmost portion eventually becoming the White Plains Post Road in the 18th and 19th centuries. In the early 20th century, as automobile use became widespread, the state paved the more heavily used sections and built new roads to create the current highway, first designated as NY 22 in 1930. In its early years the highway began in Manhattan; until 2008 its northern end was the Canadian border.

== Route description ==
NY 22 starts as an urban surface road, passing through the most populous communities along its route within its first 15 miles (24 km). After running northerly from its origin in the Bronx it veers slightly to the northeast in the vicinity of a traffic circle near Kensico Dam before heading northward for good as a mostly two-lane rural route all the way to the state's North Country.

The majority of NY 22's 337-mile (542 km) routing is maintained by the New York State Department of Transportation (NYSDOT); however, several sections are maintained by other jurisdictions. The southernmost of these is in the Bronx, where the entirety of the highway within the borough is maintained by the New York City Department of Transportation (NYCDOT). In Westchester County, NY 22 is mostly locally maintained within the city of Mount Vernon and is county-maintained within the city of White Plains. In Clinton County, the route is locally maintained within the city of Plattsburgh. (Note: New York law delegates the maintenance of all state highways within the boundaries of incorporated cities in the state, other than New York City, to those cities.)

During its course, NY 22 intersects or runs concurrently with 46 other designated routes: one state parkway, five Interstate Highways, and seven U.S. Highways not counting its own termini. Of the surface road intersections, 18 terminate at NY 22 and 15 are concurrencies shared with the crossing routes, accounting for 72.6 miles (116.8 km), or 21.5% of the highway's total length.

=== The Bronx to Kensico Dam ===
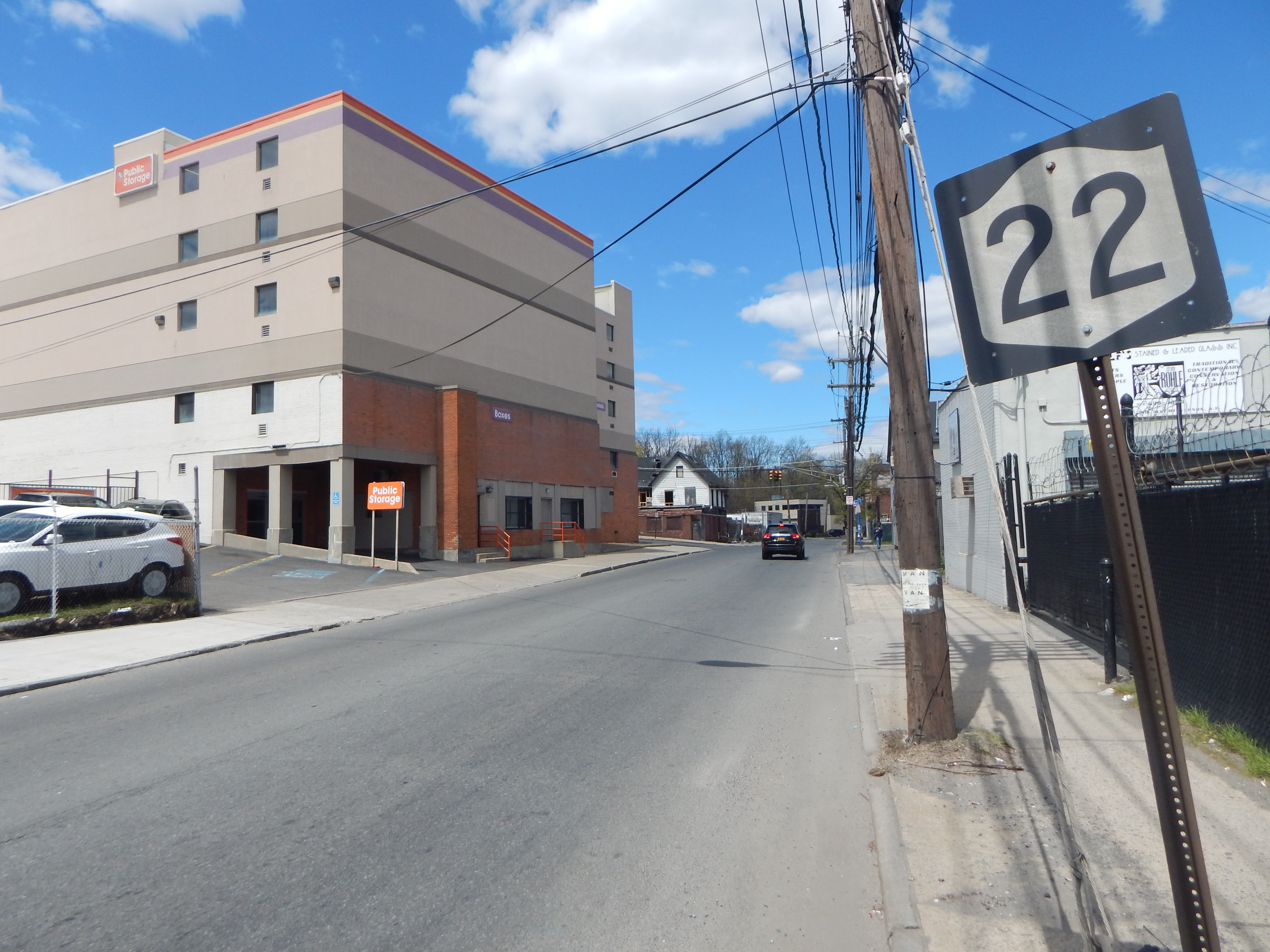
NY 22 northbound in Mount Vernon, just north of the East 233rd Street intersection in the Bronx

NY 22 starts as Provost Avenue at U.S. Route 1 (US 1) in the Eastchester section of the Bronx, intersecting with East 233rd Street about 0.2 miles (320 m) to the north. It soon crosses the Westchester county line into Mount Vernon and becomes South Third Avenue, beginning a 30-mile (48 km) section in that county. Shortly after the county line, NY 22 makes a sharp turn to the east at the South Columbus Avenue intersection, soon passing St. Paul's Church National Historic Site on its north, then curving back to that direction. It parallels the nearby Hutchinson River Parkway as it passes through the suburbs of Bronxville and Tuckahoe. At Wilson Woods Lake, it crosses under a railroad bridge on the Metro-North New Haven Line and becomes North Columbus Avenue, then has its first interchange with a freeway at the Cross County Parkway.

Country clubs on either side bracket NY 22's entry into Eastchester. It makes a turn to the northeast, passing the Vernon Hills Shopping Center to the right. After leaving Eastchester, NY 22 continues north into the village of Scarsdale. Paralleling the Bronx River Parkway (BRP), it enters Westchester's county seat, White Plains. (Note: Within that city, the highway is maintained by the county under the unsigned designations of County Route 53 (CR 53) from the Scarsdale line to NY 125, CR 108 between NY 125 and Westchester Avenue, and CR 87 from Broadway to the North Castle line.) NY 22 also intersects NY 125 and NY 119 in downtown White Plains, then bends to the northwest along North Broadway, eventually intersecting the Cross Westchester Expressway (Interstate 287 or I-287). The White Plains Rural Cemetery is visible to the west as NY 22 continues northward out of the city. In North White Plains, the surrounding area becomes less developed as NY 22 becomes a four-lane undivided expressway, and goes over a gentle rise from which a short connector runs downhill to the traffic circle where the BRP ends and the Taconic State Parkway begins, just south of Kensico Dam.

=== Kensico Reservoir to Brewster ===
While the Taconic State Parkway continues along the northwest heading NY 22 had been following, NY 22 itself veers to the northeast along the reservoir's south shore. After crossing a small bridge over one of the reservoir's bays, NY 22 begins a thousand-foot (300 m) concurrency, the first of 15 along its length, with NY 120. The combined roads pass just west of IBM's Armonk headquarters and the "Duke's Trees angle", the westernmost point in Connecticut, after which NY 22 becomes a four-lane divided expressway. For the first time, NY 22 runs parallel to New York's eastern border, intersecting I-684 for the first of several times just north of the short portion of that highway in Connecticut. A short distance later, NY 22 becomes a two-lane surface road, and NY 433, one of the state's shortest highways, (Note: At 0.7 miles (1.1 km)) heads south from NY 22 into Greenwich.

After that junction, NY 22 bends back to the north, paralleling I-684 through the Westchester countryside of large wooded lots and houses well-screened from the road. In downtown Bedford, the first settlement since White Plains, the highway overlaps with NY 172 for a mile (1.6 km), its first concurrency with an east–west route, then veers back to the northwest at the center of town. Just to the north, NY 121, the only north–south state highway whose route is entirely east of NY 22, forks off from its southern terminus. Another mile past that, NY 22 returns to a due-north heading, passing the John Jay Homestead State Historic Site a National Historic Landmark, where it turns west briefly, and Harvey School, where it curves to the northwest again. After the Katonah Museum of Art it widens briefly at a major intersection with NY 35. Two miles (3.2 km) north of that junction, NY 22 becomes parallel with I-684 into the Town of Somers and the hamlet of Goldens Bridge. On the other side of the Interstate, accessible via NY 138, is the Goldens Bridge station on Metro-North Railroad's Harlem Line, which begins a long parallel alignment with NY 22 at this point.

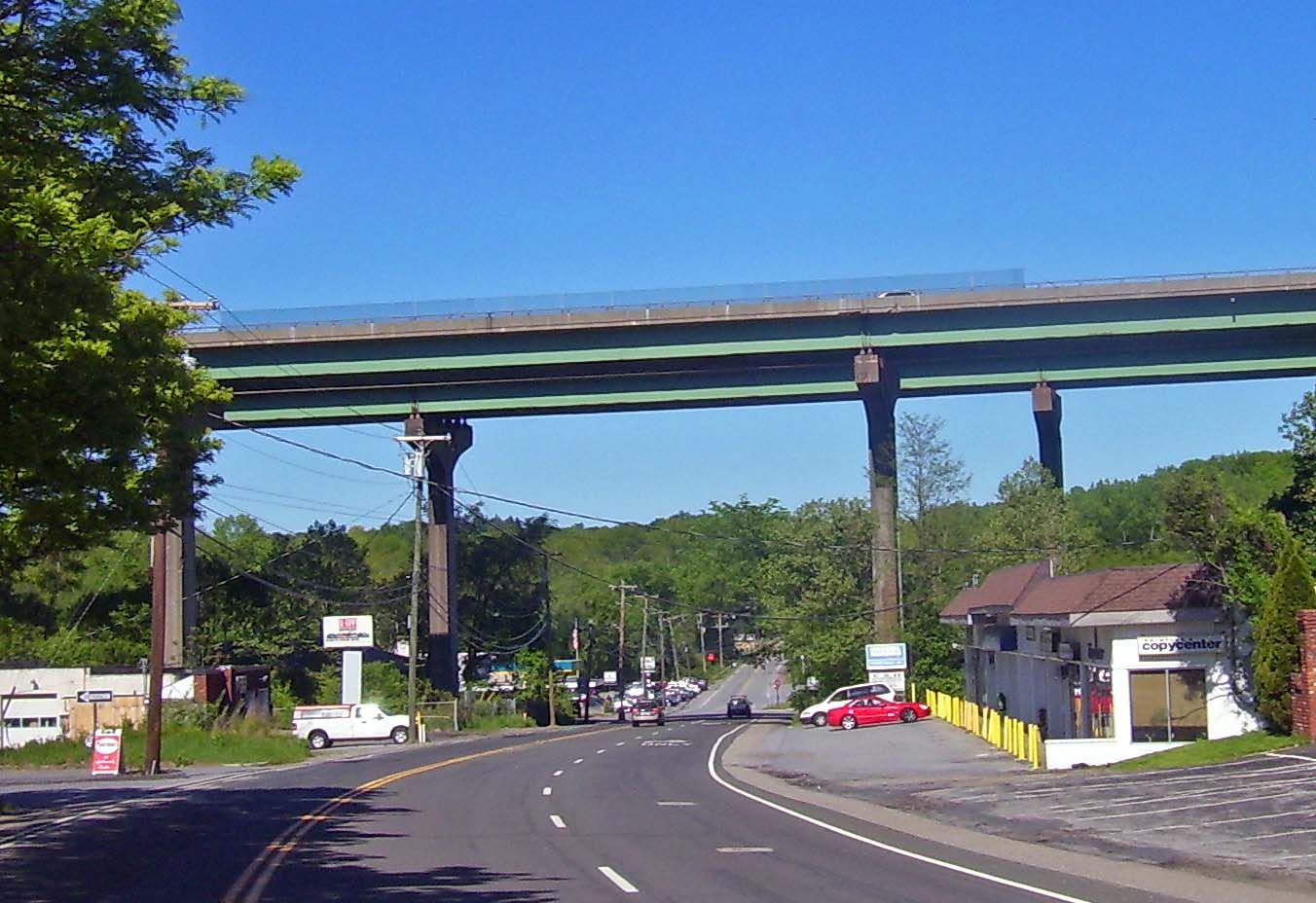
I-84 overpass north of Brewster

The railroad's Purdy's station is a short distance west of the next junction, NY 116. At another traffic light 400 feet (120 m) to the north, NY 116 goes east to Titicus Reservoir at the northern intersection, the highway crosses under I-684, remaining between it and the railroad tracks. Just past the Interstate, NY 22 turns west onto Hardscrabble Road, which soon turns north again to follow the tracks to the next station, North Salem's hamlet of Croton Falls. Just north of the hamlet, NY 22 crosses under the tracks, and is joined by US 202. (Note: US 202, signed as north–south in the other six states it traverses, is an east–west route in New York) Immediately afterward, the road crosses back under the railroad again and enters Putnam County, following the Croton River north past the spillway of East Branch Reservoir.

After paralleling the reservoir for almost two miles (3.2 km), a third route, US 6, joins the concurrency just east of the village of Brewster, forming the only three-route overlap along NY 22. The three routes cross under a high, long bridge carrying I-84, then veer east to an interchange with the north end of I-684. US 6 and 202 continue east for Danbury while NY 22 uses the northbound on-ramp of the I-684 roadway. NY 22 then briefly becomes a four-lane freeway before becoming a two-lane surface road after it cross the Croton's East Branch.

=== Harlem Valley, Taconics and Berkshires ===
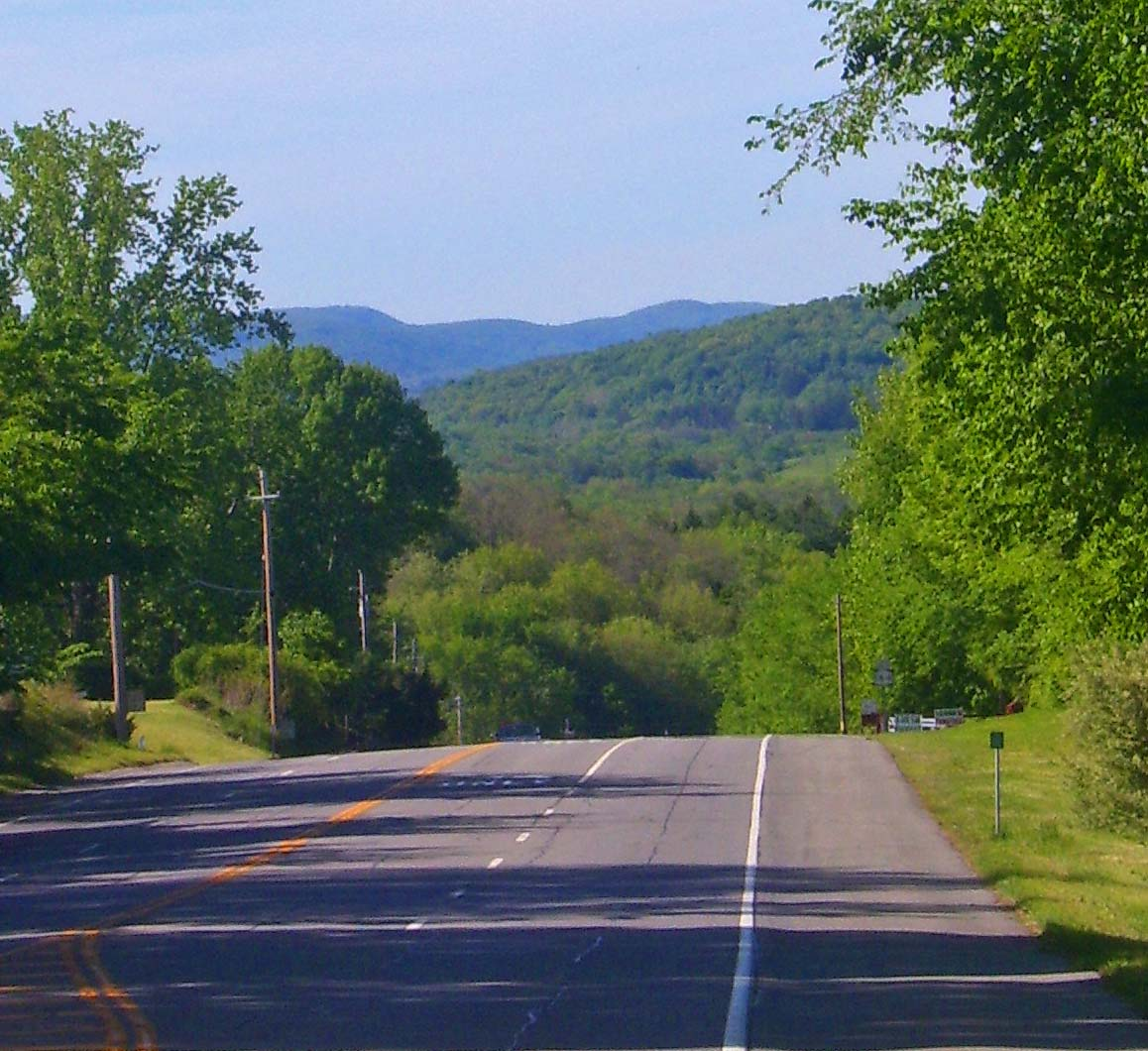
NY 22 looking north into the Harlem Valley from Patterson

NY 22 continues heading northeast along a narrow strip of land between the East Branch and Bog Brook reservoirs. It then resumes its northward heading, following a much straighter course than it had up to this point, on two lanes through wooded areas of the town of Patterson, where two local state highways, NY 312 and 164, come in from the west. The highway gradually expands to three and sometimes four lanes as it passes through built-up areas of strip development. Shortly after intersecting a third state highway, NY 311, and passing another strip plaza, NY 22 crosses into Dutchess County.

After another supermarket strip to the east, a long, gentle divided bend in the road almost a mile long ends with an overpass where NY 55 comes in from the west. It joins NY 22 as the two routes, returning to two lanes, pass through the eastern fringe of the village of Pawling and then by Trinity-Pawling School. Past the village, the railroad tracks edge closer to the highway as NY 22 enters the scenic Harlem Valley, near the lower end of the Taconic Mountains. The road curves more gently and takes longer straightaways, with lower density of residential and commercial development. Two miles (3.2 km) from Pawling, the Appalachian Trail crosses the road next to the line's similarly named station.

NY 22 and NY 55 continue their long curve into the town of Dover, past the Harlem Valley–Wingdale station next to the road across from the now-closed buildings of Harlem Valley Psychiatric Center. The NY 55 concurrency ends when that road forks off east towards Connecticut at the hamlet of Wingdale. The road continues through Dover Plains and into Amenia, where an overlap with NY 343 begins. The railroad line ends at Wassaic. NY 343 remains joined with NY 22 into the hamlet of Amenia, where it separates and heads towards Sharon, Connecticut. At the same junction, US 44 comes in from Millbrook to begin an overlap with NY 22. The valley opens up as the southern Taconics loom ahead. Shortly after crossing into the Town of North East, the highway passes by the large Coleman Station Historic District.

After intersecting with NY 199 at its eastern end, NY 22 and US 44 veer northeast into the small village of Millerton in the northern protrusion of Dutchess County's Oblong, an area once the subject of a boundary dispute between New York and Connecticut in the late 17th century. US 44 continues eastward towards Lakeville, Connecticut, only a mile (1.6 km) east at this point, while NY 22 resumes its northward course into the shadow of the ridge ahead, where 2,311-foot (704 m) Brace Mountain, Dutchess County's highest peak, dominates the view. At another gentle curve, NY 22 slips into Columbia County and the town of Ancram. North of the county line, Massachusetts becomes the state behind Alander Mountain and the other peaks visible to the east. The southernmost route from New York to the Massachusetts state line, NY 344, leaves for Bashbish Falls State Park just west of the hamlet of Copake Falls.

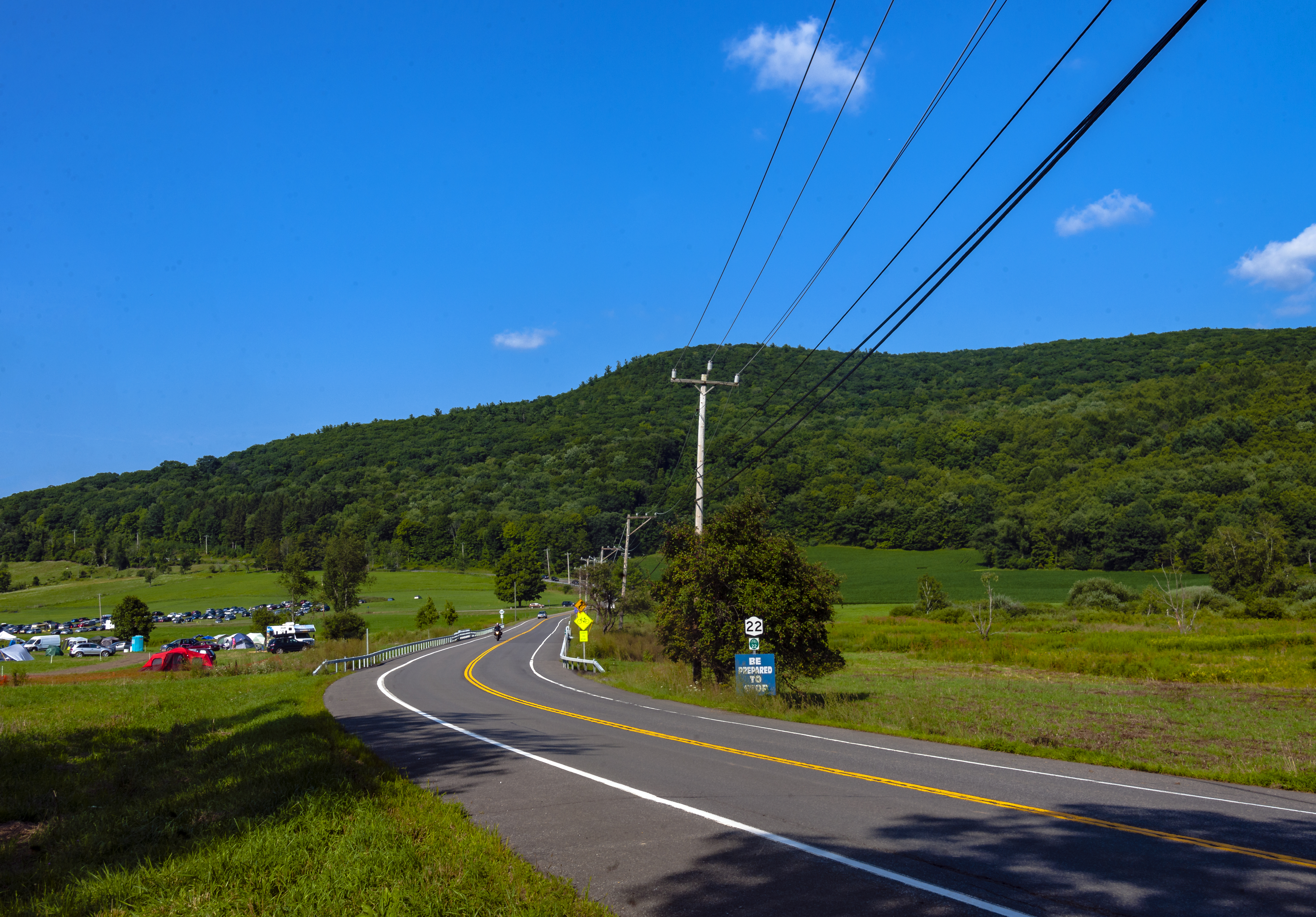
NY 22 passing the Falcon Ridge Folk Festival north of Hillsdale

The next major junction is at Hillsdale, where NY 23, the longest (Note: At 156.2 miles (251.4 km)) east–west state highway not to overlap with NY 22, intersects at a traffic light just east of downtown. At Green River, NY 71, the state's shortest two-digit route, (Note: At 2.3 miles (3.7 km), after which it continues into Massachusetts as that state's Route 71.) begins it short eastward course into Massachusetts. NY 22 then crosses into Austerlitz, where the surrounding terrain becomes much more wooded and the valleys become narrower. In the center of town, the historic hamlet of Old Austerlitz, East Hill Road offers a short detour to Steepletop, the farm where Edna St. Vincent Millay lived, another National Historic Landmark. A short distance later, NY 22 intersects with NY 203 at its eastern end.

NY 22 then veers sharply to the northeast, resuming a northward direction within 150 feet (46 m) of the state line, the highway's closest approach to it along its entire length. It then rounds a mountain and heads west, paralleling the New York State Thruway's Berkshire Connector (I-90) for a mile. NY 980D (an unsigned reference route) leaves to the east, where it becomes Massachusetts Route 102 at the state line. After Thruway exit B3, NY 22 resumes its northerly heading. From here it intersects NY 295, then passes Queechy Lake. NY 22 then straightens out to reach New Lebanon, where it intersects US 20. Ending a 41.8-mile (67.3 km) stretch with no concurrencies, the longest on NY 22, New York's longest east–west route (US 20) (Note: At 372.3 miles (599.2 km)) overlaps with its longest north–south route (NY 22) for a mile before the former continues to Pittsfield and the latter returns to the border-paralleling course, which takes it into Rensselaer County.

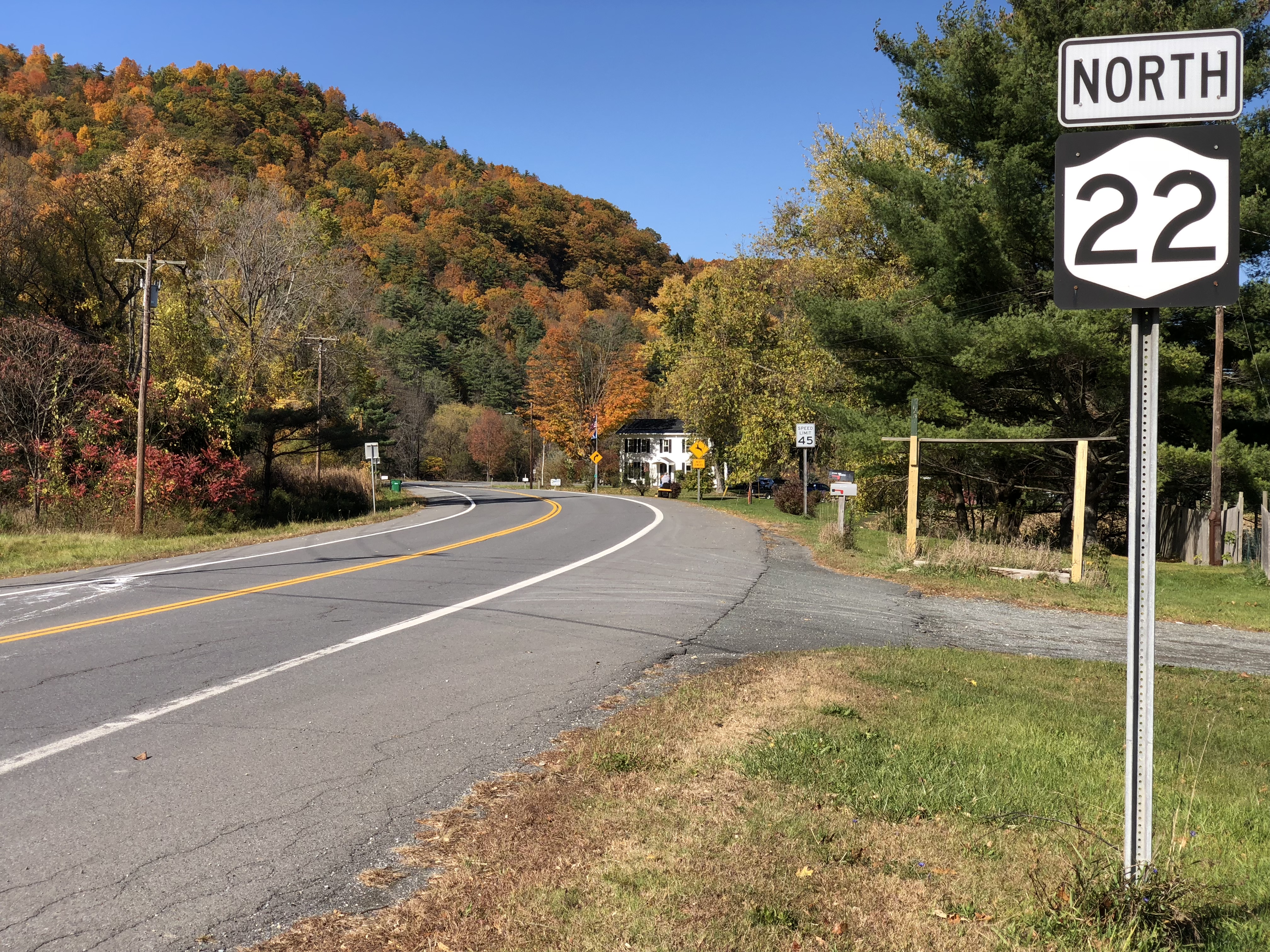
NY 22 northbound past NY 346 in Petersburgh

As NY 22 continues north, it remains, at first, within a mile of Massachusetts, moving to the east to intersect with NY 43 in Stephentown. North of that junction, it begins to run through a deep, isolated, lightly populated valley in the New York section of the Berkshires. (Note: Geologically these are still the Taconics, but due to their adjacency often commingled with the Berkshires to their east.) Wide curves take the road through the town of Berlin. NY 22 trends further west, then back east to where NY 2 crosses via an overpass at Petersburgh on its way to Petersburg Pass, the northernmost crossing of the New York–Massachusetts state line. The next road to head east from NY 22, NY 346 at North Petersburgh, enters Vermont.

Shortly afterward, the highway descends gently from the Berkshires to meet another major east–west state road, NY 7. After turning northeast to join it at a traffic light, NY 22 overlaps with Route 7 for 1,500 feet (460 m), then forks off to the north just before crossing the Hoosic River. NY 22 follows the river for 2 miles (3.2 km) to Hoosick Falls, the first village it has passed through since Millerton. There are no other state routes here, but after another two miles (3.2 km), at North Hoosick, NY 67 comes in from the east and the two roads overlap as they leave Rensselaer County.

=== Washington County ===
The next 73 miles (117 km) of NY 22 traverse Washington County, the longest portion of the highway in a single county. Almost immediately after the joined roads cross the line, NY 67 splits off to the west, crossing the Hoosick back into Rensselaer County, while NY 22 straightens out again to go due north. After four miles (6.4 km), it reaches Cambridge, where NY 313 forks off to the east. In the middle of town, NY 372, a local connector to Greenwich, ends. North of Cambridge, the highway continues through a rolling landscape of fields and farms, the low transitional country between the Appalachians and the Adirondacks. Beyond NY 29's eastern terminus at Greenwich Junction, NY 22 heads eastward again through 18 miles (29 km) of countryside until, just before reaching Granville, it comes within 0.5 miles (800 m) of the state line, the closest it has come to that boundary since Austerlitz. At the village's south end, NY 22 intersects NY 149 and the two routes overlap for 400 feet (120 m) until Route 149 begins its short journey to Vermont. Just north of Granville, the first of NY 22's two suffixed routes, NY 22A, begins its route running closely parallel to the state line and then into Vermont, where it becomes Vermont Route 22A (VT 22A), paralleling the parent route for some distance on the other side of the state line.

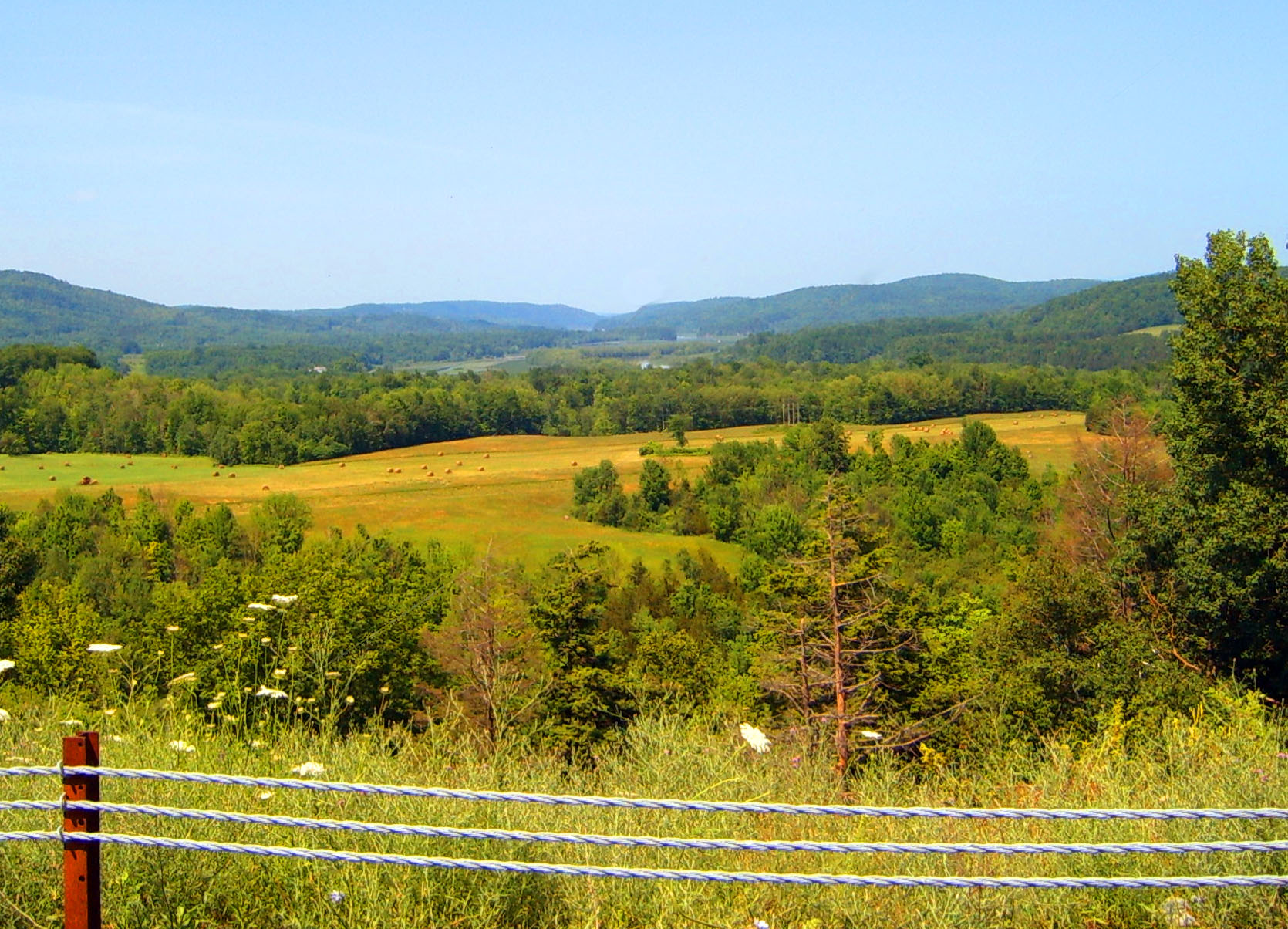
View to the Drowned Lands at the south end of Lake Champlain from near Whitehall

Immediately after this junction, NY 22 begins a long curve away from the state line that has it running due west at the end of NY 40 in North Granville. It heads northwest a little further until, after passing between Great Meadows and Washington state prisons, it reaches US 4 and turns right to join it, resuming its northward course. At this point the highway is 8 miles (13 km) from the state line, the farthest west it has gotten from it since southern Westchester County. The overlap with US 4, the first to pair NY 22 with another north–south route (Note: US 4 is signed as east–west through Vermont and New Hampshire since those segments are oriented that way.) since the short concurrency with NY 120, lasts for seven miles (11 km) along the base of the Adirondack foothills between the low country and Lake George, before ending in Whitehall, where US 4 leaves to assume the east–west course it takes across northern New England.

=== Adirondack Park and Lake Champlain ===
As NY 22 bends westward after leaving Whitehall, it rounds the north end of the ridge to the west, offering views into Vermont. Once again the Vermont state line is very near NY 22, but now it is separated from New York by water instead of land. The stream at the bottom of this valley, surrounded by the low lying Drowned Lands flood plain, is the inflow for Lake Champlain. The lake's South Bay, which the road crosses immediately after this turn, is also the Blue Line. NY 22 has now entered the Adirondack Park, the 6.1-million-acre (25,000 km^{2}) Forest Preserve and National Historic Landmark, and the largest publicly protected area in the contiguous United States. Within the park, NY 22 mainly follows the lakeshore, closer to some of its more populated areas.

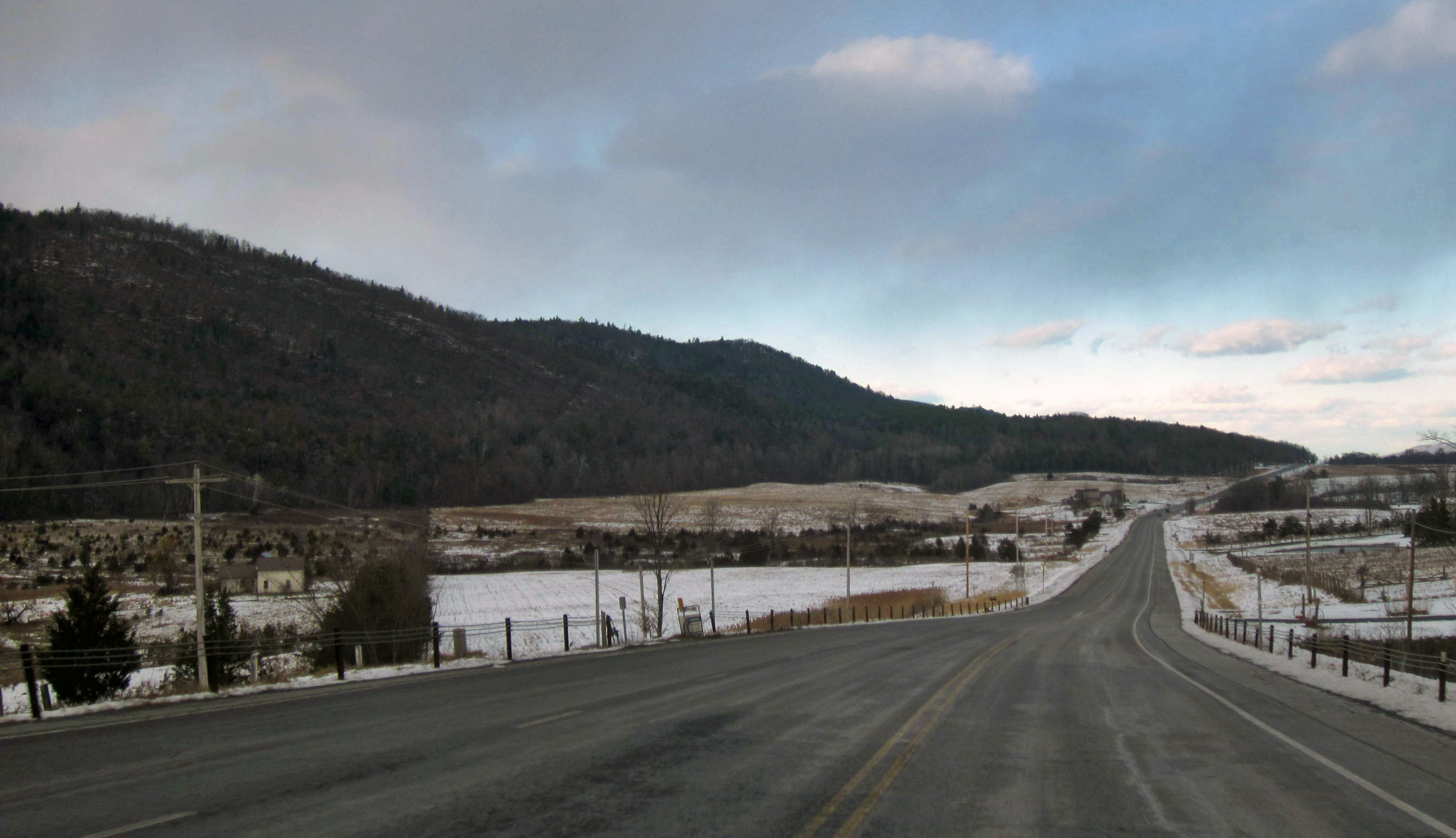
NY 22 in Washington County north of Whitehall

It climbs through rock cuts as it meanders north on the narrowing isthmus between Lakes Champlain and George. Near the northern end, it crosses the Essex County line. Two miles (3.2 km) into the county, it reaches the first settlement along its length within the Adirondack Park, Ticonderoga. The highway skirts the northeastern edge of the village, the site of key battles in both the French and Indian and Revolutionary Wars, as NY 74 comes in from the ferry to the east, the first intersecting state route since Whitehall, ending the longest such break on NY 22 at 24.9 miles (40.1 km). The two routes overlap for almost two miles (3.2 km) until NY 74 goes straight ahead at the intersection with NY 9N, while NY 22 turns right to join NY 9N, the longest suffixed route in the state, and return to its northbound orientation for the longest of its concurrencies, at 25.5 miles (41.0 km).

At first, NY 22 and NY 9N veer west, away from the lake, but then return to its shoreline to avoid a nearby mountain, just before Crown Point. NY 185, a small connector road, runs from NY 9N and NY 22 along the peninsula to become VT 17. The road remains close to the widening lake for the next 15 miles (24 km), with the tracks of the Delaware and Hudson Railroad, used today by CSX for freight and Amtrak for passenger service between New York and Montreal, sometimes immediately to the east. After passing through Port Henry to Westport, where 9N leaves heading west for Elizabethtown. Beyond that junction, NY 22 again turns inland, going through the easy pass around Split Rock Mountain, going northwest to Wadhams where it turns northeast to Whallonsburg, then north. At Boquet, it makes an abrupt turn to go 3 miles (4.8 km) due east back to the lakeshore and ferry landing at Essex, where it connects to the Charlotte–Essex Ferry via Dock Street, leading to VT F-5 on the opposite side of Lake Champlain.

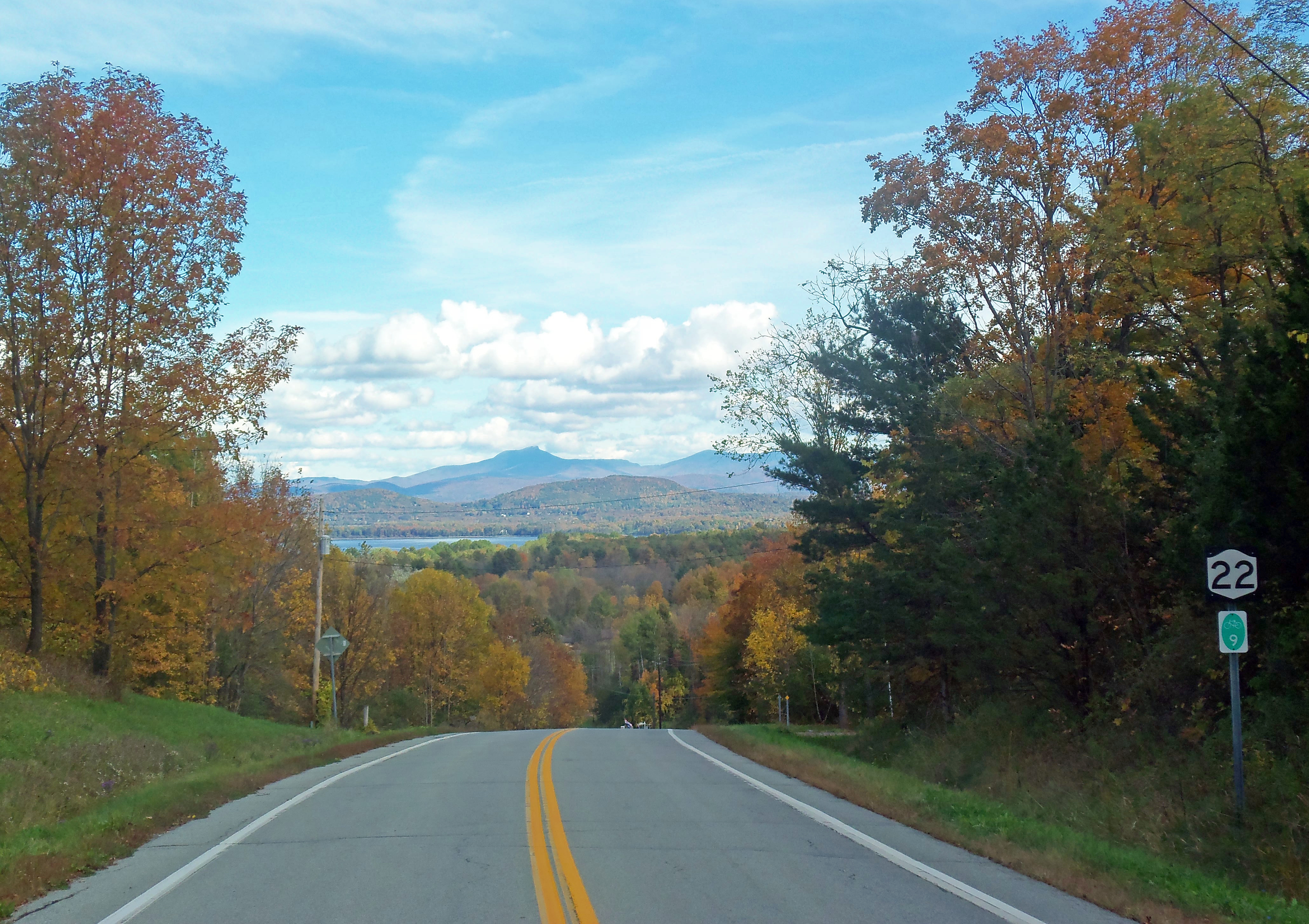
View of Vermont and Lake Champlain near Essex

The highway again follows the lakeshore to Willsboro, where NY 22 heads to the northwest again, inland, through dense forest, until it heads west and intersects US 9 in the town of Chesterfield, the other major north–south surface route up the state's eastern side. NY 22 and US 9 join, closely parallel to the Adirondack Northway (I-87), the only other route in the state to directly connect New York City with Canada. The three routes, spread over many miles in the southern part of the state, run through a narrow corridor for two miles (3.2 km) until US 9 and NY 22 veer east again toward Keeseville.

Here, NY 9N ends and US 9 and NY 22 separate, ending the last concurrency along the latter. The two will exchange corridors, with US 9 following the lake shore line while NY 22 remains mostly inland. NY 22 enters Clinton County just north of Keeseville, and then leaves Adirondack Park two miles (3.2 km) beyond at the Peru town line.

=== Clinton County ===
Just south of the hamlet of Peru, the short NY 442 terminates at NY 22. In the hamlet itself, after the Little Au Sable River crossing, NY 22's other suffixed route, NY 22B, branches off further inland. NY 22 continues north of Peru, and returns to the Northway's side again in a mile. After another five miles (8.0 km), it has its first exit on the Northway near the now-closed Plattsburgh Air Force Base. It continues northeastward, crossing the Saranac River into Plattsburgh, the first city and most populous community NY 22 has passed through since White Plains. (Note: Plattsburgh's population is estimated to be 19,696 as of 2017.)

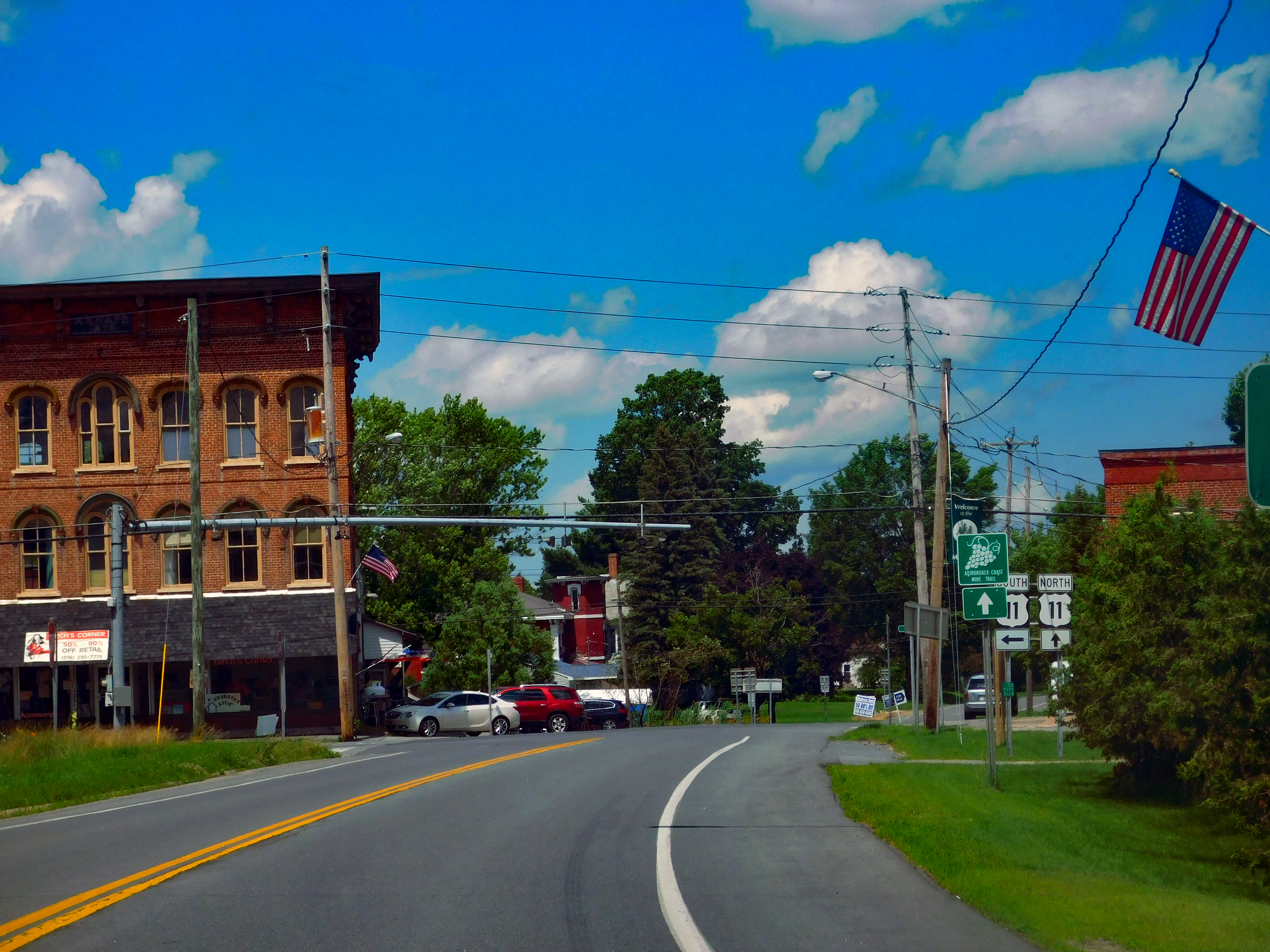
Northern terminus of NY 22 at US 11 in Mooers

NY 22 runs along South Catherine Street for a few blocks, then divides into one-way couplets for the first time since Westchester County, with northbound traffic moving a block to the east to follow Oak Street, while southbound traffic comes down North Catherine Street. It parallels US 9 for a couple of blocks, intersecting NY 3 (Cornelia Street) just a block west of its eastern terminus at that highway. After Boynton Avenue, the separate streets reunite and turns northwest just before it has its second and final exit with the Northway. Just after the exit, NY 374 begins along the westbound route as NY 22 turns to the north once again.

The highway follows the railroad tracks into Beekmantown until it bears left at a fork, trending further west to Beekmantown Corners, where another short local road, County Route 58, formerly NY 456, comes to its western end. After crossing into the next town, Chazy, NY 22 bears left again at another fork to drift further to the west. The terrain around the road becomes increasingly wooded, with long unbroken stretches of pine, in the northern portion of the town. This is briefly broken at another western terminus of a short local road, County Route 23, formerly NY 191, in the hamlet of Sciota.

NY 22 continues past Sciota in a fairly straight north-northwesterly course through more woods with small home and farm clearings. Those yield to mostly fields just before the Great Chazy River, after which NY 22 enters the hamlet of Mooers. NY 22 comes to an end upon intersecting US 11.

== History ==
=== In popular culture ===
The road is celebrated and described in Benjamin Swett's 2007 photographic travelogue, Route 22.

=== Old roads ===
The road from the modern-day Bronx (then part of Westchester County) through White Plains to Bedford and points north was originally an old Native American path. This path was later used and widened by the first European settlers. During colonial times, the road was known as "the road to Bedford and Vermont". Further north, near Lake Champlain, the route now used by NY 22 was used by the St. Francis Indians of Canada as they went south to find warmer fishing areas. The old road was also used heavily during the American Revolution to transport iron south from the mines in the Adirondacks.

Once White Plains became the county seat of Westchester in 1759, the road between the village and the city of New York (then encompassing only Manhattan) became an important route and was established as the White Plains Post Road. Before 1797, the main road heading to points north and east out of Manhattan went via Kingsbridge along the old Boston Post Road. A new bridge over the Harlem River (the original Harlem Bridge) was opened in 1797, shortening the route out of Manhattan. This also relocated the Boston and White Plains Post roads to a new alignment along Third Avenue and Boston Road. The White Plains Post Road separated from the Boston Post Road in Bronxdale, with the road to Boston heading east and the road to White Plains heading north. The old White Plains Post Road roughly followed the alignment of modern-day White Plains Road, which was laid out in 1863. (The original post road was to the east of the modern-day avenue). The White Plains Post Road continued north through Olinville, Wakefield, and Mount Vernon, where the route shifted east to modern-day White Plains Post Road, going through Bronxville and Scarsdale to White Plains.

The stretch from Salem to the Vermont border in Granville was part of the old Northern Turnpike, which began in Lansingburgh and went along modern-day NY 40. The Northern Turnpike was chartered on April 1, 1799.

=== Public ownership ===
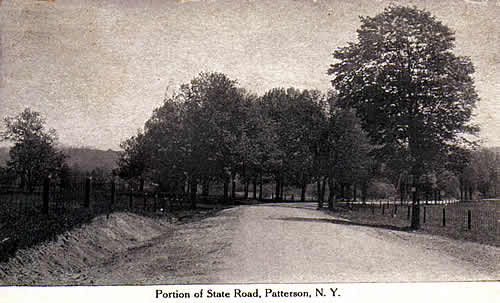
A picture of State Road in Patterson, which would later become part of 22

In 1868, the New York State Legislature formed a commission "to regulate, grade, widen, gravel, and improve the old White Plains Post Road", which was amended in 1870 to "macadamize the road" between Mount Vernon and White Plains. The post road south of Mount Vernon, which was part of New York City, was later widened between 1902 and 1908.

State highways were first formally defined by the state legislature in 1909 and given numeric designations, although these initial designations were not publicly signed. Portions of modern NY 22 were defined as part of legislative routes 1 and 22. Legislative route 1 went from the New York City line north along the White Plains Post Road to White Plains, then detoured to Harrison (via Westchester Avenue), before proceeding north to Armonk (via modern NY 120). Legislative route 1 continued north along modern NY 22 to Austerlitz, where it then turned northwest to Valatie (via modern NY 203 and NY 980B), then followed US 9 to Albany. Legislative route 22 had two segments. The southern segment began in Troy, following NY 7 to Hoosick, then went north along modern NY 22 up to Putnam Station (south of Ticonderoga).

=== NY 22 designation ===
Original NY 22 shield, adopted in 1927

In 1924, New York signed several major state roads with route numbers. Most of Legislative Route 1 was designated as NY 22, but with a direct route between White Plains and Armonk. Also, instead of continuing to Valatie, NY 22 initially ended at the NY 23 intersection in Hillsdale. By 1929, the road to Valatie had been improved and NY 22 was extended to US 9, with a length of 139 miles (224 km). The middle section of modern NY 22 was designated in 1924 as NY 24, running for 75 miles (121 km) from Stephentown to Comstock. The portion of modern NY 22 north of Whitehall remained unnumbered in 1924 but the next year NY 30, a route assigned in 1924 that linked Mechanicville to Whitehall, was extended north from Whitehall to the Canadian border north of Mooers. In the 1930 renumbering, the NY 24 and NY 30 designations were both reassigned elsewhere. NY 22 was then extended north along their former routes, incorporating newly improved roads between Austerlitz and Stephentown, creating the 370-mile (600 km) route that existed until 2008. The segment of old NY 22 between Austerlitz and Valatie was renumbered to NY 203.

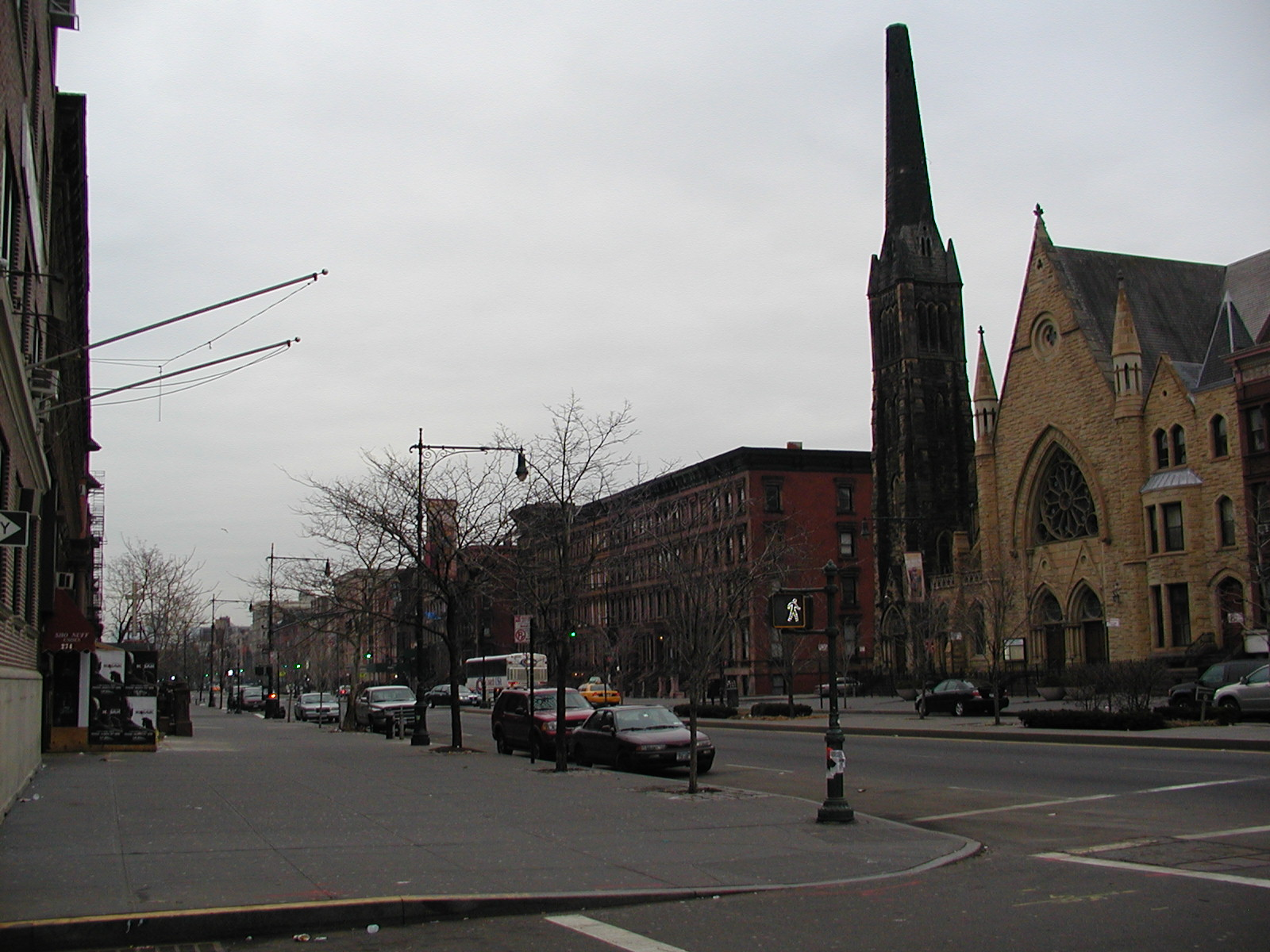
View down Lenox Avenue from West 124th Street and Malcolm X Boulevard. This was once part of NY 22 in Manhattan

In 1934, at the insistence of the Automobile Club of New York, several numbered routes were extended and signed within New York City, with NY 22 among them. It was extended south from the Mount Vernon line in the Bronx along White Plains Road, then following East 233rd Street to Webster Avenue until Fordham Road (US 1). From there, it continued south along the Grand Concourse (then overlapped with NY 100), crossing into Manhattan via East 149th Street to the 145th Street Bridge. In Manhattan, the NY 22/100 concurrency continued south along Lenox Avenue, 110th Street, Fifth Avenue, 96th Street, and Park Avenue, ending at Houston Street (NY 1A). By 1941, the alignment within Mount Vernon was shifted east to use Columbus Avenue and South 3rd Avenue (current NY 22), continuing its route to New York City via East 233rd Street as before. On January 1, 1970, the NY 22 designation was removed from Manhattan and most of the Bronx, and the short piece remaining in the city was realigned to meet US 1 at NY 22's current southern terminus.

=== U.S. Route 7 ===
In the original plan for the U.S. Highway System, as approved by the Bureau of Public Roads in November 1926, US 7 was defined as beginning in New York City and designated on the alignment of NY 22 to Amenia, where it shifted northeast into Sharon, Connecticut, to use old New England Route 4 through Massachusetts and Vermont all the way to the Canadian border. Apparently New York did not approve this plan, and by mid-1927 the official route log published by the American Association of State Highway Officials had relocated the southern end of US 7 to Norwalk, Connecticut.

=== NY 9N concurrency ===
In the 1930 renumbering of state highways in New York, the stretch from Ticonderoga to Keeseville now concurrent with NY 9N was designated solely as NY 22. The north end of NY 47 was also located at an intersection with NY 22 in Ticonderoga. At Westport, NY 22 connected to NY 195, an east–west highway leading to Elizabethtown. At the time, Route 9N only extended from there to Keeseville. NY 9N was extended southward to Lake George c. 1936, supplanting Routes 47 and 195 and becoming concurrent with NY 22 between Ticonderoga and Westport.

NY 8 originally extended eastward from Hague to a ferry across Lake Champlain at Putnam when it was assigned as part of the renumbering. In between the two locations, the route utilized modern NY 9N, Montcalm Street, NY 22, and Wrights Ferry and Wrights roads. It was realigned in the early 1930s to continue east from Ticonderoga on what is now NY 74 to another ferry across the lake. NY 8 was altered again c. 1934 to follow NY 22 north from Ticonderoga to Crown Point, where it turned off the highway onto Bridge Road (now NY 185). Route 8 remained intact along this routing until c. 1968, when Route 8 was truncated southwestward to NY 9N at Hague.

=== Realignments ===
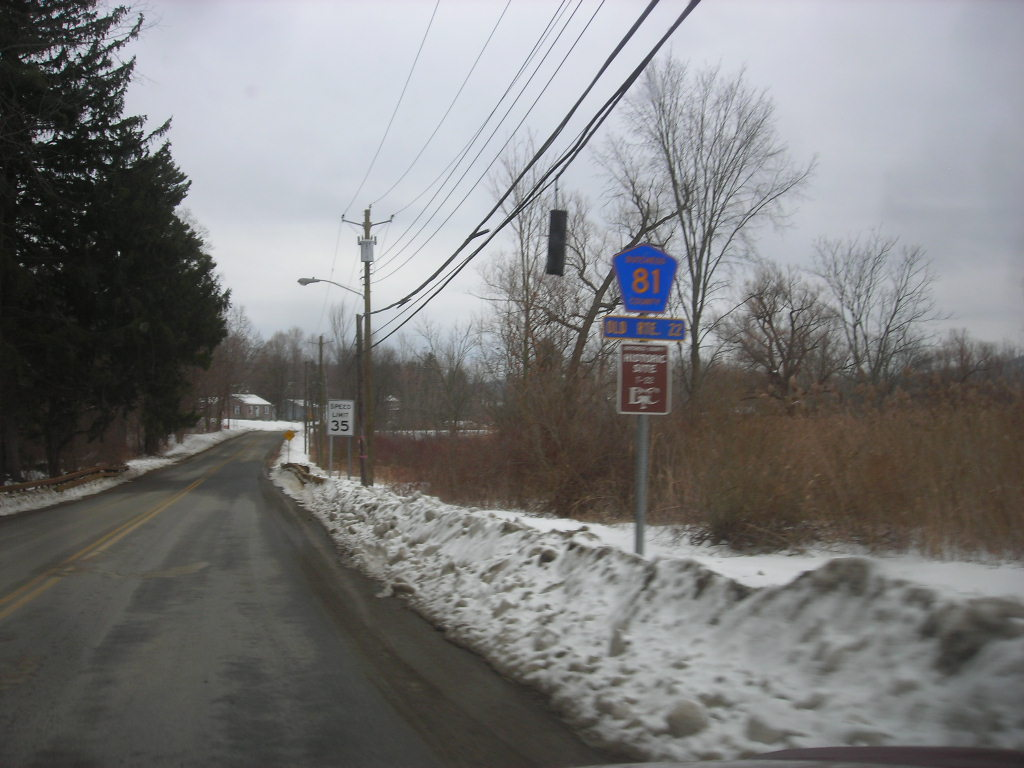
Dutchess CR 81, a realigned section of NY 22

Over the course of many years, several sections of NY 22 were straightened, realigned to new roads, or both. Some old alignments are still either county-maintained or state-maintained. Several of these are in Dutchess County. In Dover Plains, the southern leg of NY 22's junction with NY 343 is maintained by the state as NY 980G, a reference route. To the north in the town of Amenia, a 4.03-mile-long (6.49 km) loop off NY 22 between Wassaic and Amenia is designated as CR 81. Another former routing of NY 22 in the town of Dover exists as CR 6, a loop route between the hamlets of Wingdale and Dover Plains that runs along the west bank of the Ten Mile River. Within the 44/22 concurrency, part of CR 5 (and its short spur 5S), a mile-long (1.6 km) loop west of the highway south of Millerton, is also a former alignment of NY 22.

Before the construction of I-684, NY 22 continued northeast along Sodom Road north of Brewster on what is now CR 50, a dead-end road maintained by Putnam County. Modern NY 22 joins the I-684 roadway at exit 10 (the northern terminus of I-684) and connects to the surface road on the opposite side of the Croton River via the NY 981B connector. South of Copake Falls, the state also still maintains an old alignment designated as NY 980F. North of Copake Falls, the northern half of the original alignment was designated as an extension of NY 344.

=== Mooers area ===
The segment of NY 22 north of US 11, named Hemmingford Road, was state-maintained until 1988, when ownership and maintenance of that part of the route was transferred to Clinton County as part of a highway maintenance swap between the county and the state of New York. Following the swap, it was co-designated as CR 34 by Clinton County. In 2008, the signed northern terminus of NY 22 was moved to the eastern end of its overlap with US 11 in Mooers. The official alignment of NY 22 was not changed, however, as the New York State Department of Transportation still considered the Canadian border to be NY 22's northern terminus until 2014.

== Major intersections ==
County	Location	mi	km	Destinations	Notes
The Bronx	Eastchester	0.00	0.00	US 1 (Boston Road)	Southern terminus
Westchester	Mount Vernon	2.79	4.49	Cross County Parkway	Exit 8 on Cross County Parkway
Westchester	Town of Eastchester	6.94	11.17	To Bronx River Parkway	Access via Brook Street; hamlet of Eastchester
Westchester	White Plains	11.17	17.98	NY 125 south (Mamaroneck Avenue)	Northern terminus of NY 125
Westchester	White Plains	11.51	18.52	To I-287	Access via Westchester Avenue
Westchester	White Plains	11.75	18.91	NY 119 west (Hamilton Avenue)	Eastern terminus of NY 119
Westchester	White Plains	12.52	20.15	I-287 (Cross Westchester Expressway) to Bronx River Parkway – Governor Mario M. Cuomo Bridge	Access to Bronx River Parkway via Cemetery Road; exit 6 on I-287
Westchester	Town of North Castle	13.28	21.37	To I-287 – Port Chester, Governor Mario M. Cuomo Bridge	No southbound entrance; access via Central Westchester Parkway
Westchester	Town of North Castle	13.83	22.26	To Bronx River Parkway south / Taconic State Parkway north	Northbound exit and southbound entrance; access via North Broadway
Westchester	Town of North Castle	13.83	22.26	Southern end of limited-access section	
Westchester	Town of North Castle			Bronx River Parkway south / Taconic State Parkway north	Southbound exit and northbound entrance; Kensico Circle
Westchester	Town of North Castle			Bridge over the Kensico Reservoir	
Westchester	Town of North Castle	17.47	28.12	NY 120 south – Rye	At-grade intersection; southern end of NY 120 concurrency
Westchester	Town of North Castle	17.79	28.63	NY 120 north – Chappaqua	At-grade intersection; northern end of NY 120 concurrency
Westchester	Town of North Castle	18.94	30.48	NY 128 north – Armonk	At-grade intersection; southern terminus of NY 128; hamlet of Armonk
Westchester	Town of North Castle	19.57	31.49	I-684 – White Plains, Brewster	Exits 3N and 3S on I-684; former I-87
Westchester	Town of North Castle	19.97	32.14	Northern end of limited-access section	
Westchester	Town of North Castle	19.97	32.14	NY 433 south – Glenville	Northern terminus of NY 433; former NY 128
Westchester	Town of Bedford	25.80	41.52	NY 172 west to I-684 – Mount Kisco	Western end of NY 172 concurrency
Westchester	Town of Bedford	26.83	43.18	NY 172 east – Pound Ridge, Stamford, CT	Eastern end of NY 172 concurrency; hamlet of Bedford
Westchester	Town of Bedford	26.97	43.40	To NY 172 east – Pound Ridge, Stamford, CT	Access via Village Green
Westchester	Town of Bedford	27.21	43.79	NY 121 north – Cross River	Southern terminus of NY 121
Westchester	Town of Bedford	32.10	51.66	NY 35 to I-684 – Katonah, Cross River	
Westchester	Town of Lewisboro	34.25	55.12	To I-684 south / NY 138	Access via North Street; hamlet of Goldens Bridge
Westchester	Town of North Salem	36.76	59.16	I-684 south / NY 116 west – Somers	Southern end of NY 116 concurrency; exit 7 on I-684; hamlet of Purdys
Westchester	Town of North Salem	36.83	59.27	NY 116 east – North Salem	Northern end of NY 116 concurrency; hamlet of Purdys
Westchester	Town of North Salem	38.13	61.36	To I-684	Access via Hardscrabble Road; hamlet of Croton Falls
Westchester	Town of North Salem	38.68	62.25	To US 202 west – Mahopac	Access via Croton Falls Road
Westchester	Town of North Salem	38.84	62.51	US 202 west – Mahopac	Southern end of US 202 concurrency
Putnam	Brewster	43.29	69.67	US 6 west – Carmel	Southern end of US 6 concurrency
Putnam	Town of Southeast	44.20	71.13	Southern end of freeway section	
Putnam	Town of Southeast	44.20	71.13	I-84 / I-684 south / US 6 east / US 202 east – Newburgh, Danbury, White Plains	Northern end of US 6/US 202 concurrency; northern terminus and exit 10 on I-684
Putnam	Town of Southeast	45.13	72.63	Northern end of freeway section	
Putnam	Town of Southeast	47.18	75.93	NY 312 west – Carmel	Eastern terminus of NY 312; former NY 52; hamlet of Sears Corners
Putnam	Town of Patterson	50.36	81.05	NY 164 west – Towners, Lake Carmel	Eastern terminus of NY 164
Putnam	Town of Patterson	53.53	86.15	NY 311 west – Patterson, Lake Carmel	Northern terminus of NY 311
Dutchess	Town of Pawling	56.02	90.16	NY 55 west – Poughkeepsie	Trumpet interchange; southern end of NY 55 concurrency
Dutchess	Town of Dover	62.90	101.23	NY 55 east – Gaylordsville, CT	Northern end of NY 55 concurrency; hamlet of Wingdale
Dutchess	Town of Dover	63.09	101.53	To NY 55 east – Gaylordsville, CT	Access via Pleasant Ridge Road; hamlet of Wingdale
Dutchess	Town of Dover	70.32	113.17	To NY 343 west – Millbrook	Access via NY 980G; hamlet of Dover Plains
Dutchess	Town of Amenia	71.32	114.78	NY 343 west – Millbrook	Southern end of NY 343 concurrency; former routing of NY 22
Dutchess	Town of Amenia	78.71	126.67	US 44 west / NY 343 east – Millbrook, Sharon, CT	Northern end of NY 343 concurrency; southern end of US 44 concurrency; hamlet of Amenia
Dutchess	North East	85.71	137.94	NY 199 west – Pine Plains	Eastern terminus of NY 199
Dutchess	Millerton	87.30	140.50	US 44 east – Lakeville, CT	Northern end of US 44 concurrency
Columbia	Town of Copake	99.62	160.32	To NY 344 east – Copake Falls, Taconic State Park	Access via NY 980F; hamlet of Copake Falls
Columbia	Town of Copake	100.12	161.13	NY 344 east – Copake Falls, Taconic State Park	Western terminus of NY 344; hamlet of Copake Falls
Columbia	Town of Hillsdale	104.16	167.63	NY 23 – Great Barrington, MA	Hamlet of Hillsdale
Columbia	Town of Hillsdale	108.20	174.13	CR 21	Former NY 217; hamlet of North Hillsdale
Columbia	Town of Hillsdale	111.42	179.31	NY 71 east – Great Barrington, MA	Western terminus of NY 71; hamlet of Green River
Columbia	Town of Hillsdale	111.59	179.59	To NY 71 east – Great Barrington, MA	Access via NY 980E; hamlet of Green River
Columbia	Austerlitz	115.07	185.19	NY 203 north to Taconic State Parkway – Spencertown, Chatham	Southern terminus of NY 203
Columbia	Canaan	119.57	192.43	To Route 102 east – Stockbridge, West Stockbridge	Access via NY 980D
Columbia	Canaan	120.33	193.65	I-90 Toll / Berkshire Connector to Mass Pike east – Albany, Boston	Exit B3 on I-90 / Thruway
Columbia	Canaan	123.18	198.24	NY 295 to Taconic State Parkway – Chatham, Pittsfield, MA	
Columbia	New Lebanon	128.12	206.19	US 20 west – Albany	Southern end of US 20 concurrency; hamlet of New Lebanon
Columbia	New Lebanon	128.86	207.38	US 20 east – Pittsfield, MA	Northern end of US 20 concurrency; hamlet of Lebanon Springs
Rensselaer	Stephentown	134.86	217.04	To NY 43	Access via Provost Road
Rensselaer	Petersburgh	150.26	241.82	NY 2 to I-87 / I-787 – Petersburgh, Troy, Watervliet	Interchange; access via NY 914A; hamlet of Petersburg
Rensselaer	Petersburgh	155.55	250.33	NY 346 east	Western terminus of NY 346; hamlet of North Petersburg
Rensselaer	Hoosick Falls	157.78	253.92	NY 7 west to I-87 / I-787 south – Troy	Western end of NY 7 concurrency
Rensselaer	Hoosick Falls	158.11	254.45	NY 7 east – Bennington, VT	Eastern end of NY 7 concurrency
Rensselaer	Hoosick Falls	164.16	264.19	NY 67 east – North Bennington, VT	Southern end of NY 67 concurrency; hamlet of North Hoosick
Washington	White Creek	166.65	268.20	NY 67 west to I-87 – Valley Falls, Mechanicville, Malta, Ballston Spa	Northern end of NY 67 concurrency
Washington	Village of Cambridge	171.65	276.24	NY 313 east – Arlington, VT	Western terminus of NY 313
Washington	Village of Cambridge	171.98	276.77	NY 372 west – Greenwich	Eastern terminus of NY 372
Washington	Town of Salem	181.00	291.29	NY 29 west to I-87 – Greenwich, Schuylerville, Saratoga Springs	Eastern terminus of NY 29
Washington	Town of Granville	199.49	321.05	NY 149 west to I-87 – Hartford, Fort Ann, Queensbury, Lake George	Southern end of NY 149 concurrency
Washington	Town of Granville	199.56	321.16	NY 149 east – Granville	Northern end of NY 149 concurrency
Washington	Town of Granville	202.27	325.52	NY 22A north – Middle Granville	Southern terminus of NY 22A; hamlet of Middle Granville
Washington	Town of Granville	206.71	332.67	NY 40 south – Hartford	Northern terminus of NY 40; hamlet of North Granville
Washington	Town of Fort Ann	210.96	339.51	US 4 south to I-87 / Lakes to Locks Passage – Fort Ann, Queensbury, Lake George	Southern end of US 4 concurrency; hamlet of Comstock
Washington	Village of Whitehall	217.67	350.31	US 4 north – Rutland, VT	Northern end of US 4 concurrency
Washington	Village of Whitehall			Bridge over South Bay	
Essex	Ticonderoga	242.52	390.30	NY 74 east – Fort Ticonderoga, Ferry to Vermont	Southern end of NY 74 concurrency; hamlet of Ticonderoga
Essex	Ticonderoga	244.12	392.87	NY 9N south / NY 74 west to I-87 – Ticonderoga, Schroon Lake	Northern end of NY 74 concurrency; southern end of NY 9N concurrency
Essex	Crown Point	255.43	411.07	NY 185 north to VT 17 – Bridge to Vermont	Southern terminus of NY 185
Essex	Westport	269.60	433.88	NY 9N north to I-87 – Elizabethtown	Northern end of NY 9N concurrency; hamlet of Westport
Essex	Chesterfield	295.80	476.04	I-87 / US 9 south – Elizabethtown	Southern end of US 9 concurrency; exit 33 on I-87; access to I-87 via NY 915K
Essex	Chesterfield	300.37	483.40	US 9 north / Lakes to Locks Passage – Ausable Chasm, Plattsburgh NY 9N begins	Northern end of US 9 concurrency; northern terminus of NY 9N; hamlet of Keeseville
Clinton	Au Sable	300.64	483.83	NY 9N south to I-87 / A-15 north – Au Sable Forks, Whiteface Mountain	Northern end of NY 9N concurrency; hamlet of Keeseville
Clinton	Peru	306.22	492.81	NY 442 east to I-87	Western terminus of NY 442; hamlet of Peru
Clinton	Peru	306.45	493.18	NY 22B north – Schuyler Falls	Southern terminus of NY 22B; hamlet of Peru
Clinton	Town of Plattsburgh	312.58	503.05	I-87	Exit 36 on I-87
Clinton	City of Plattsburgh	316.98	510.13	NY 3 (Cornelia Street)	
Clinton	Town of Plattsburgh	318.17	512.04	I-87 – Albany, Montreal	Exit 38 on I-87
Clinton	Town of Plattsburgh	318.50	512.58	NY 374 west / Tom Miller Road – Dannemora, Saranac Lake	Eastern terminus of NY 374
Clinton	Beekmantown	323.17	520.09	CR 58 to I-87	Former NY 456
Clinton	Chazy	332.39	534.93	CR 23 to I-87	Former NY 191; hamlet of Sciota
Clinton	Mooers	337.26	542.77	US 11 to I-87 / A-15 north – Champlain, Malone	Northern terminus; hamlet of Mooers
1.000 mi = 1.609 km; 1.000 km = 0.621 mi: Concurrency terminus; Electronic toll collection; Incomplete access

== Suffixed routes ==
NY 22 has two suffixed routes, both in the North Country.

- NY 22A (10.61 miles or 17.08 kilometers) is a spur connecting NY 22 to the Vermont state line south of Fair Haven. Once in Vermont, the route becomes VT 22A. The route was assigned in the early 1940s.
- NY 22B (10.90 miles or 17.54 kilometers) is a bypass around the southern and western extents of Plattsburgh. NY 22B begins at NY 22 in Peru and continues north through Schuyler Falls to Morrisonville, where it terminates at NY 3 near Clinton County Airport. It was assigned as part of the 1930 renumbering of state highways in New York.

== See also ==
- New York State Bicycle Route 22

County route systems containing a former alignment

- List of county routes in Clinton County, New York
- List of county routes in Dutchess County, New York
- List of county routes in Putnam County, New York
- List of county routes in Westchester County, New York
