= West Chazy, New York =

- Census-designated place
- Location in Clinton County and the state of New York.
- Coordinates: 44°49′14″N 73°30′30″W
- Country: United States
- State: New York
- County: Clinton
- Town: Chazy

Area
  - Total: 1.88 sq mi (4.86 km^{2})
  - Land: 1.88 sq mi (4.86 km^{2})
  - Water: 0 sq mi (0.00 km^{2})
- Elevation: 290 ft (88 m)

Population (2020)
  - Total: 558
  - Density: 297.2/sq mi (114.76/km^{2})
- Time zone: UTC-5 (Eastern (EST))
  - Summer (DST): UTC-4 (EDT)
- ZIP code: 12992
- Area code: 518
- FIPS code: 36-79543
- GNIS feature ID: 0969175

West Chazy is a hamlet and census-designated place in the town of Chazy in Clinton County, New York, United States. As of the 2020 census, West Chazy had a population of 558.

== Geography ==
West Chazy is located in the southwestern part of the town of Chazy along the Little Chazy River, which flows northeastward to Lake Champlain. New York State Route 22 passes through the hamlet, leading south 10 miles (16 km) to Plattsburgh, the county seat, and north 10 miles (16 km) to Mooers. The hamlet of Chazy is 6 miles (10 km) to the northeast along county roads.

According to the United States Census Bureau, the West Chazy CDP has a total area of 1.9 square miles (4.9 km^{2}), all land.

== Demographics ==
Historical population
Census	Pop.	Note	%±
2020	558		—
U.S. Decennial Census

== Education ==
The census-designated place is within the Beekmantown Central School District.
