= Alice T. Miner Museum =

- U.S. National Register of Historic Places
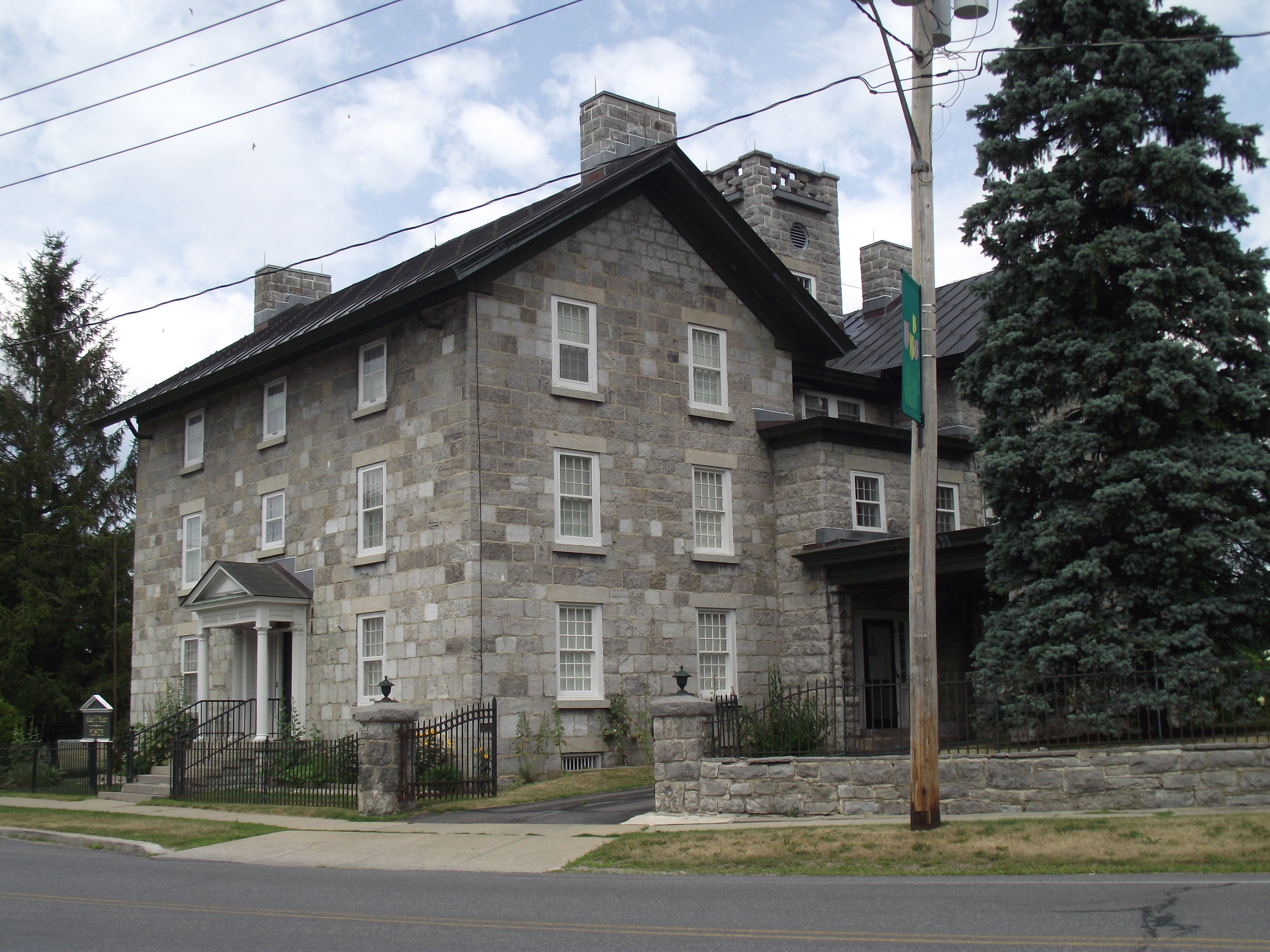

- Location within New York Location within the United States
- Location: 9618 State Road Route 9, Chazy, New York
- Coordinates: 44°53′10″N 73°26′8″W
- Area: 0.9 acres (0.36 ha)
- Architectural style: Colonial Revival
- NRHP reference No.: 10000799
- Added to NRHP: September 24, 2010

The Alice T. Miner Museum, also known as Alice T. Miner Colonial Collection, is located at Chazy in Clinton County, New York on the Adirondack Coast. Opened in 1924, the museum was created by Alice T. Miner, a pioneer in the Colonial Revival movement and wife of William H. Miner, railroad industrialist.

The museum has 15 rooms filled with period furniture, miniature furniture, a vast china collection, porcelain and glass, a superb collection of early samplers and other textiles, War of 1812 muskets, Revolutionary War cannonballs, dolls and other early Americana.

The building was added to the National Register of Historic Places in 2010.
