= Altona (CDP), New York =

Altona, New York
- Census-designated place
- Location in Clinton County and the state of New York.
- Coordinates: 44°53′24″N 73°39′10″W
- Country: United States
- State: New York
- County: Clinton
- Town: Altona

Area
  - Total: 1.71 sq mi (4.43 km^{2})
  - Land: 1.71 sq mi (4.43 km^{2})
  - Water: 0 sq mi (0.00 km^{2})
- Elevation: 636 ft (194 m)

Population (2020)
  - Total: 662
  - Density: 387.3/sq mi (149.54/km^{2})
- Time zone: UTC-5 (Eastern (EST))
  - Summer (DST): UTC-4 (EDT)
- ZIP code: 12910
- Area code: 518
- FIPS code: 36-01572
- GNIS feature ID: 0942404

Altona is a hamlet and census-designated place (CDP) in the town of Altona, Clinton County, New York, United States. The population was 662 at the 2020 census, out of a total town population of 2,666.

== Geography ==
The hamlet of Altona is located in the northern part of the town of Altona at 44°53′24″N 73°39′9″W (44.890096, -73.65272). The Great Chazy River flows along the southeastern edge of the hamlet, dropping 150 feet (46 m) in elevation in 1.7 miles (2.7 km). The Ganienkeh Community of the Mohawk people is southwest of the hamlet.

According to the United States Census Bureau, the Altona CDP has a total area of 1.7 square miles (4.4 km^{2}), all land.

== Demographics ==
Historical population
Census	Pop.	Note	%±
2000	1,056		—
2010	730		−30.9%
2020	662		−9.3%
U.S. Decennial Census

As of the census of 2000, there were 1,056 people, 140 households, and 89 families residing in the CDP. The population density was 628.6 inhabitants per square mile (242.7/km^{2}). There were 157 housing units at an average density of 93.5 per square mile (36.1/km^{2}). The racial makeup of the CDP was 49.43% White, 35.42% Black or African American, 0.76% Native American, 0.19% Asian, 13.83% from other races, and 0.38% from two or more races. Hispanic or Latino of any race were 23.58% of the population.

There were 140 households, out of which 27.1% had children under the age of 18 living with them, 47.9% were married couples living together, 10.7% had a female householder with no husband present, and 36.4% were non-families. 30.7% of all households were made up of individuals, and 19.3% had someone living alone who was 65 years of age or older. The average household size was 2.30 and the average family size was 2.78.

In the CDP, the population was spread out, with 7.0% under the age of 18, 13.3% from 18 to 24, 56.0% from 25 to 44, 16.9% from 45 to 64, and 6.9% who were 65 years of age or older. The median age was 35 years. For every 100 females, there were 532.3 males. For every 100 females age 18 and over, there were 611.6 males.

The median income for a household in the CDP was $44,688, and the median income for a family was $51,528. Males had a median income of $24,628 versus $23,864 for females. The per capita income for the CDP was $17,535. About 6.8% of families and 14.8% of the population were below the poverty line, including 20.8% of those under age 18 and 10.9% of those age 65 or over.

== Education ==
The census-designated place is within the Northern Adirondack Central School District.
