= Mooers, New York =

- Town
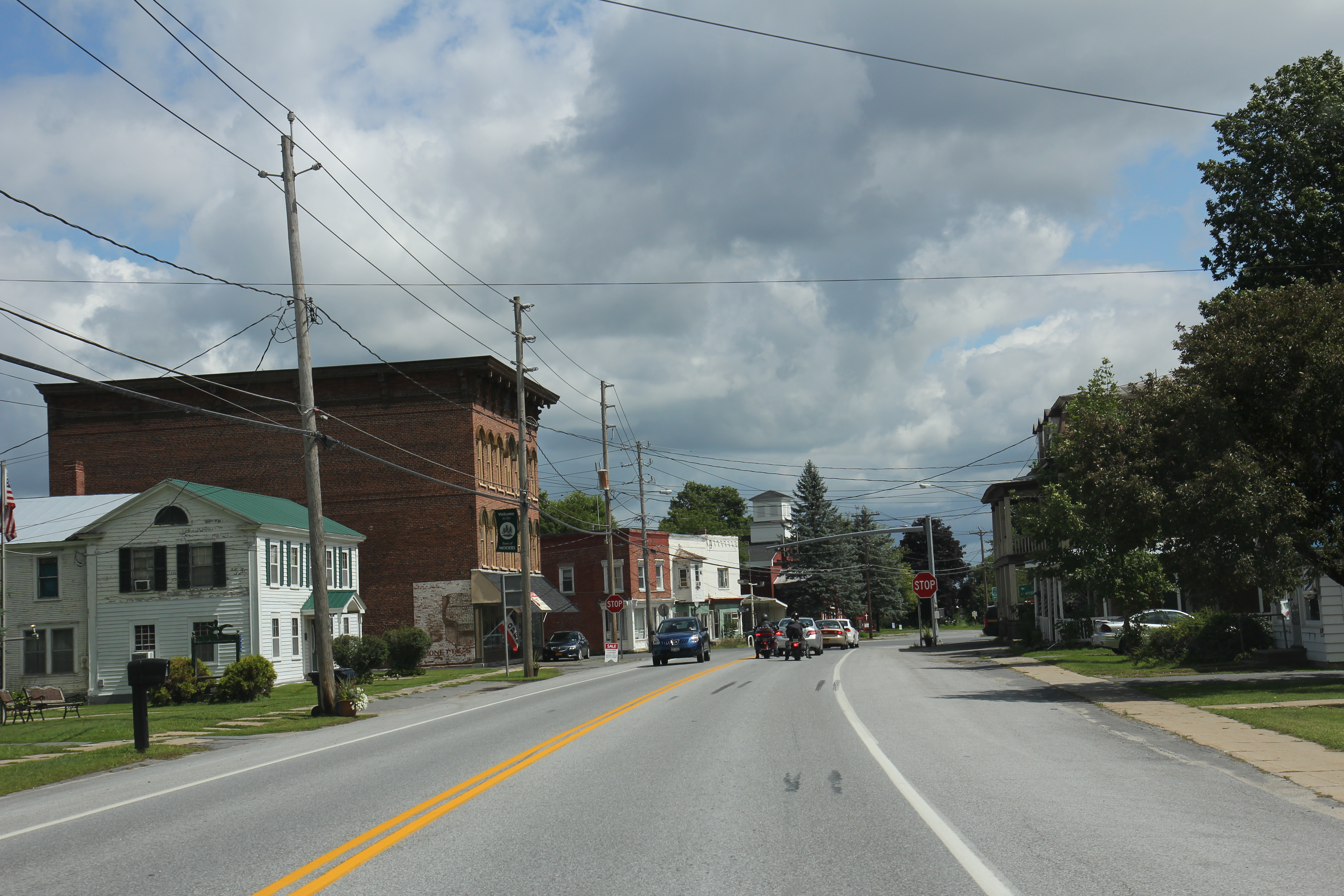

- Location in Clinton County and the state of New York.
- Coordinates: 44°57′48″N 73°35′14″W
- Country: United States
- State: New York
- County: Clinton

Government
  - Type: Town Council
  - Town Supervisor: Jeff Menard (R)
  - Town Council: Members' List: • Chris Bulriss (R); • Irving Breyette (R); • E. Dick Boulerice (D); • Donald Perras (R)

Area
  - Total: 87.92 sq mi (227.72 km^{2})
  - Land: 87.58 sq mi (226.84 km^{2})
  - Water: 0.34 sq mi (0.88 km^{2})
- Elevation: 280 ft (85 m)

Population (2010)
  - Total: 3,592
  - Estimate (2016): 3,591
  - Density: 41.0/sq mi (15.83/km^{2})
- Time zone: Eastern (EST)
- ZIP Codes: 12958 (Mooers); 12959 (Mooers Forks); 12910 (Altona); 12935 (Ellenburg Depot)
- Area code: 518
- FIPS code: 36-019-48252
- Website: mooersny.com

Mooers is a town in Clinton County, New York, United States. The population was 3,592 at the 2010 census. The town is named after Benjamin Mooers, an early settler.

The town forms part of the northern border of Clinton County and is northwest of Plattsburgh.

== History ==
The region was first settled c. 1796. The town of Mooers was formed from part of the town of Champlain in 1804. In 1830, part of the town was used to create the new town of Ellenburg.

== Geography ==
According to the United States Census Bureau, Mooers has a total area of 87.9 square miles (227.7 km^{2}), of which 87.6 square miles (227.0 km^{2}) is land and 0.31 square miles (0.8 km^{2}), or 0.33%, is water.

The northern town line is the Canada–US border with Quebec, Canada. The Great Chazy River flows eastward through the town.

U.S. Route 11 runs east–west through Mooers, intersecting with the northern terminus of New York State Route 22 in Mooers village.

== Demographics ==
Historical population
Census	Pop.	Note	%±
1820	567		—
1830	1,222		115.5%
1840	1,703		39.4%
1850	3,365		97.6%
1860	3,926		16.7%
1870	4,634		18.0%
1880	4,381		−5.5%
1890	3,467		−20.9%
1900	3,572		3.0%
1910	3,163		−11.5%
1920	2,788		−11.9%
1930	2,655		−4.8%
1940	2,686		1.2%
1950	2,509		−6.6%
1960	2,587		3.1%
1970	2,606		0.7%
1980	2,927		12.3%
1990	2,995		2.3%
2000	3,398		13.5%
2010	3,592		5.7%
2016 (est.)	3,591	▼	0.0%
U.S. Decennial Census

As of the census of 2000, there were 3,404 people, 1,264 households, and 942 families residing in the town. The population density was 38.8 inhabitants per square mile (15.0/km^{2}). There were 1,431 housing units at an average density of 16.3 units per square mile (6.3 units/km^{2}). The racial makeup of the town was 98.09% White, 0.21% Black or African American, 0.56% Native American, 0.24% Asian, 0.24% from other races, and 0.68% from two or more races. Hispanic or Latino of any race were 0.79% of the population.

There were 1,264 households, out of which 36.9% had children under the age of 18 living with them, 60.0% were married couples living together, 8.9% had a female householder with no husband present, and 25.4% were non-families. 20.4% of all households were made up of individuals, and 9.5% had someone living alone who was 65 years of age or older. The average household size was 2.69 and the average family size was 3.08.

In the town, the population was spread out, with 26.8% under the age of 18, 7.0% from 18 to 24, 32.1% from 25 to 44, 22.8% from 45 to 64, and 11.3% who were 65 years of age or older. The median age was 36 years. For every 100 females, there were 103.8 males. For every 100 females age 18 and over, there were 98.8 males.

The median income for a household in the town was $39,152, and the median income for a family was $41,908. Males had a median income of $32,033 versus $25,255 for females. The per capita income for the town was $15,645. About 6.2% of families and 10.9% of the population were below the poverty line, including 11.8% of those under age 18 and 11.9% of those age 65 or over.

== Communities and locations in Mooers ==
- Angellville – A former community once located in the southeastern part of Mooers.
- Cannon Corners – A hamlet in the western part of the town at Cannon Corners and Davison roads, which is situated between Mooers Forks and the Canada–US border.
- English River – A small stream in the western part of the town.
- Mooers – The hamlet of Mooers is located in the eastern part of the town, at the junction of US-11 and NY-22 at the Chazy River. The community was once called "Mooers-upon-the-Chazy".
- Mooers Forks (formerly "Centerville") – A hamlet near the geographic center of the town on US-11.
- Twin Bridges – A hamlet on the eastern town line on US-11.
- Whitney Corners – A hamlet west of Mooers Forks.
- Woods Falls – A hamlet in the southern part of the town, south of Mooers Forks.

== See also ==
- Mooers (CDP), New York
