= Benjamin Swett =

American photographer and writer

Photographer and writer Benjamin Swett was born on March 3, 1959, in Washington, D.C. Educated at Andover and Harvard University, he worked for a number of years for the New York City Department of Parks and Recreation, where he photographed and wrote about neighborhood parks around the city. His first publication, Great Trees of New York City: A Guide, was for the Parks Department.

His subsequent works have all featured text and photographs. Route 22 (2007) is a narrative history of the state highway that stretches from the Bowery in New York to the Canadian border near Montreal. This book, along with The Hudson Valley: A Cultural Guide (2009), and New York City of Trees (2013), were all published by Quantuck Lane Press. New York City of Trees, winner of the New York Society Library's 2013 New York City Book Award for Photography, provides photographs and descriptions of unusual or characteristic trees around the five boroughs of New York City. The photographs from Route 22 have been exhibited at Albany International Airport and the Arts Center of the Capital Region in Troy, New York, and the photographs from New York City of Trees at The Arsenal Gallery in Central Park and Wave Hill.

== Bibliography ==
- Great Trees of New York City: A Guide (New York: New York Tree Trust, 2000, ASIN B0006RE0M6)
- Route 22 (New York, Quantuck Lane Press, 2007, ISBN 978-1593720261)
- The Hudson Valley: A Cultural Guide (New York: Quantuck Lane Press, 2009, ISBN 978-1593720353)
- New York City of Trees (New York: Quantuck Lane Press, 2013, ISBN 978-1593720520 )

== Awards ==
- New York Society Library 2013 New York City Book Award for New York City of Trees
- International Grenfell Association 2015 Grant for "Creating the Grandois Archive"
