= Altona Correctional Facility =

Medium-security state prison, located in New York, US

Coordinates: 44°53′29″N 73°39′36″W

- Interactive map of Altona Correctional Facility
- Location: 555 Devils Den Road Altona, New York
- Status: Open
- Security class: Medium
- Capacity: 512
- Opened: 1983
- Managed by: New York State Department of Corrections and Community Supervision

Altona Correctional Facility is a medium security prison in New York in the United States. The prison is in the Town of Altona in Clinton County. As of 2010 Altona had a working capacity of 512.

== History ==
Altona Correctional Facility was built using the former Altona Central School building as the central administrative and school building. It wasn't uncommon for corrections officers at the time of the prison's opening to have attended the school as children.
