= Battle of Ticonderoga =

Battle of Ticonderoga may refer to:

- Battle of Ticonderoga (1758) or Battle of Carillon, an unsuccessful British attack on a numerically disadvantaged French garrison
- Battle of Ticonderoga (1759), a British approach that forced a small French garrison to withdraw
- Battle of Ticonderoga (1775) or Capture of Fort Ticonderoga, a surprise capture of the fort by Americans
- Battle of Ticonderoga (1777), a British army approach that forced the Continental Army to withdraw
