= Chazy (CDP), New York =

Chazy, New York
- Census-designated place
- Location in Clinton County and the state of New York.
- Coordinates: 44°53′22″N 73°26′9″W
- Country: United States
- State: New York
- County: Clinton
- Town: Chazy

Area
  - Total: 1.71 sq mi (4.44 km^{2})
  - Land: 1.69 sq mi (4.39 km^{2})
  - Water: 0.019 sq mi (0.05 km^{2})
- Elevation: 148 ft (45 m)

Population (2020)
  - Total: 548
  - Density: 323/sq mi (124.8/km^{2})
- Time zone: UTC-5 (Eastern (EST))
  - Summer (DST): UTC-4 (EDT)
- ZIP code: 12921
- Area code: 518
- FIPS code: 36-14102
- GNIS feature ID: 0946462

Chazy is a hamlet and census-designated place (CDP) in the town of Chazy, Clinton County, New York, United States. The population was 565 at the 2010 census, out of a total town population of 4,284.

== Geography ==
The hamlet of Chazy is located in the northeastern part of the town of Chazy on the Little Chazy River, 3 miles (5 km) west of where the river flows into Lake Champlain. U.S. Route 9 passes through the center of the hamlet, leading south 14 miles (23 km) to Plattsburgh, the county seat, and north 9 miles (14 km) to the Canada–US border. New York State Route 191 runs west from Chazy 1 mile (1.6 km) to Exit 41 of Interstate 87, which leads south 173 miles (278 km) to Albany, New York's state capital, and north (via Quebec Autoroute 15) 48 miles (77 km) to Montreal.

According to the United States Census Bureau, the Chazy CDP has a total area of 1.7 square miles (4.4 km^{2}), of which 0.02 square miles (0.05 km^{2}), or 1.04%, is water.

== Demographics ==
Historical population
Census	Pop.	Note	%±
2020	548		—
U.S. Decennial Census
