= Mooers (CDP), New York =

Mooers, New York
- Hamlet and CDP
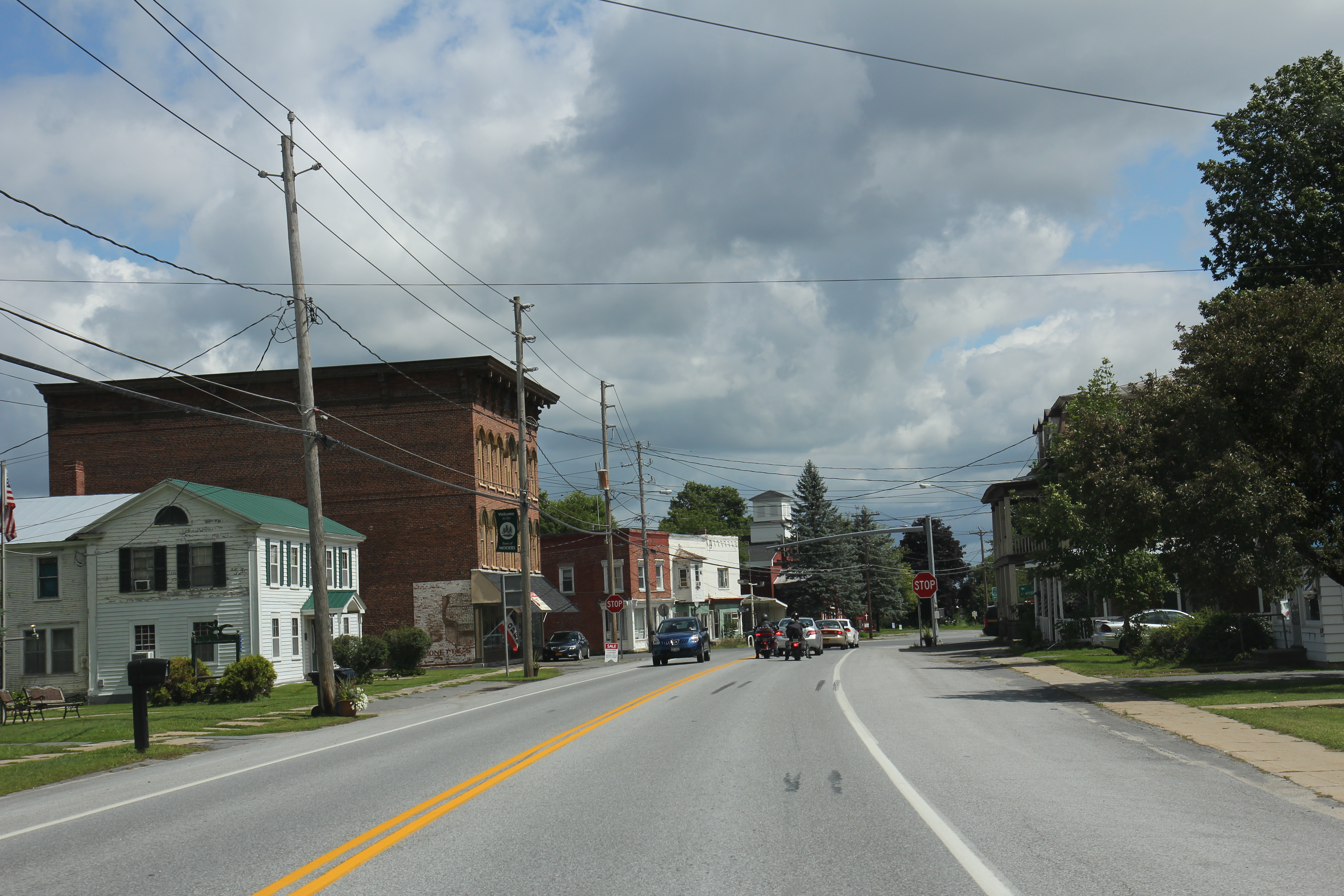
- Downtown Mooers on US Route 11

- Location in Clinton County and the state of New York.
- Coordinates: 44°57′40″N 73°35′10″W
- Country: United States
- State: New York
- County: Clinton
- Town: Mooers
- Incorporated: September 1899
- Dissolved: March 31, 1994

Area
  - Total: 1.25 sq mi (3.25 km^{2})
  - Land: 1.21 sq mi (3.14 km^{2})
  - Water: 0.042 sq mi (0.11 km^{2})
- Elevation: 282 ft (86 m)

Population (2020)
  - Total: 451
  - Density: 371.6/sq mi (143.48/km^{2})
- Time zone: UTC-5 (Eastern (EST))
  - Summer (DST): UTC-4 (EDT)
- ZIP code: 12958
- Area code: 518
- FIPS code: 36-48241
- GNIS feature ID: 2389503

Mooers, formerly Mooers-upon-the-Chazy, is a hamlet and census-designated place in the town of Mooers, in Clinton County, New York, United States. The population was 442 at the 2010 census, out of a total population of 3,592 in the town. It was once an incorporated village, but dissolved in 1994.

Mooers is in northern New York state, near the Canada–United States border with the Canadian province of Quebec.

== Geography ==
The hamlet of Mooers is located in the eastern part of the town of Mooers at 44°57′37″N 73°35′0″W (44.96053, -73.58337), 3 miles (5 km) south of the Canada–US border. The community is at the junction of U.S. Route 11 and New York State Route 22 on the north side of the Great Chazy River. US-11 leads east 6 miles (10 km) to Interstate 87 at the village of Champlain and west 27 miles (43 km) to Chateaugay, while NY-22 leads south 20 miles (32 km) to Plattsburgh, the county seat.

According to the United States Census Bureau, the Mooers CDP has a total area of 1.2 square miles (3.2 km^{2}), of which 1.2 square miles (3.1 km^{2}) is land and 0.04 square miles (0.1 km^{2}), or 3.08%, is water.

== Demographics ==
Historical population
Census	Pop.	Note	%±
2010	475		—
2020	451		−5.1%
U.S. Decennial Census

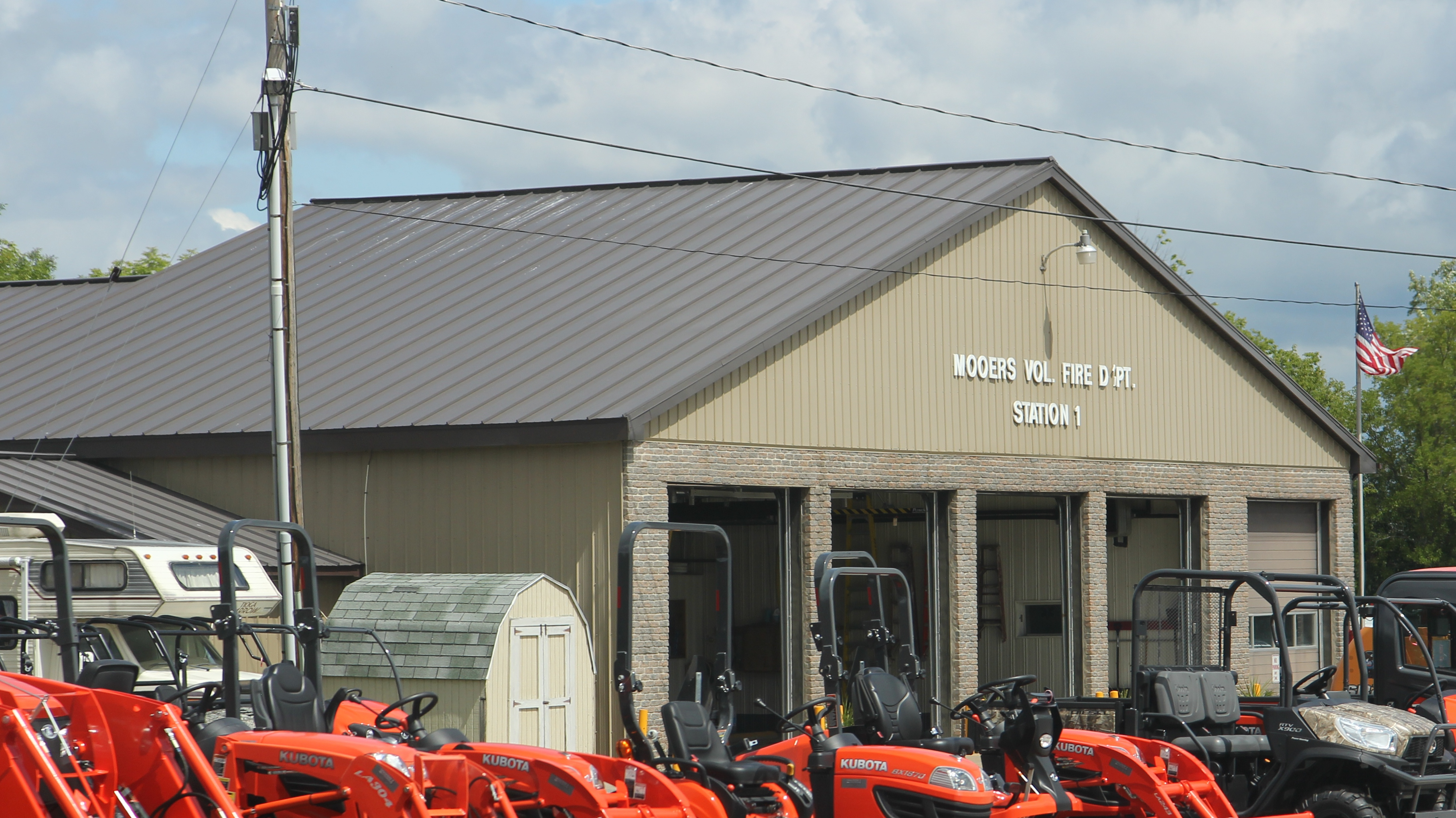
Fire station for Mooers

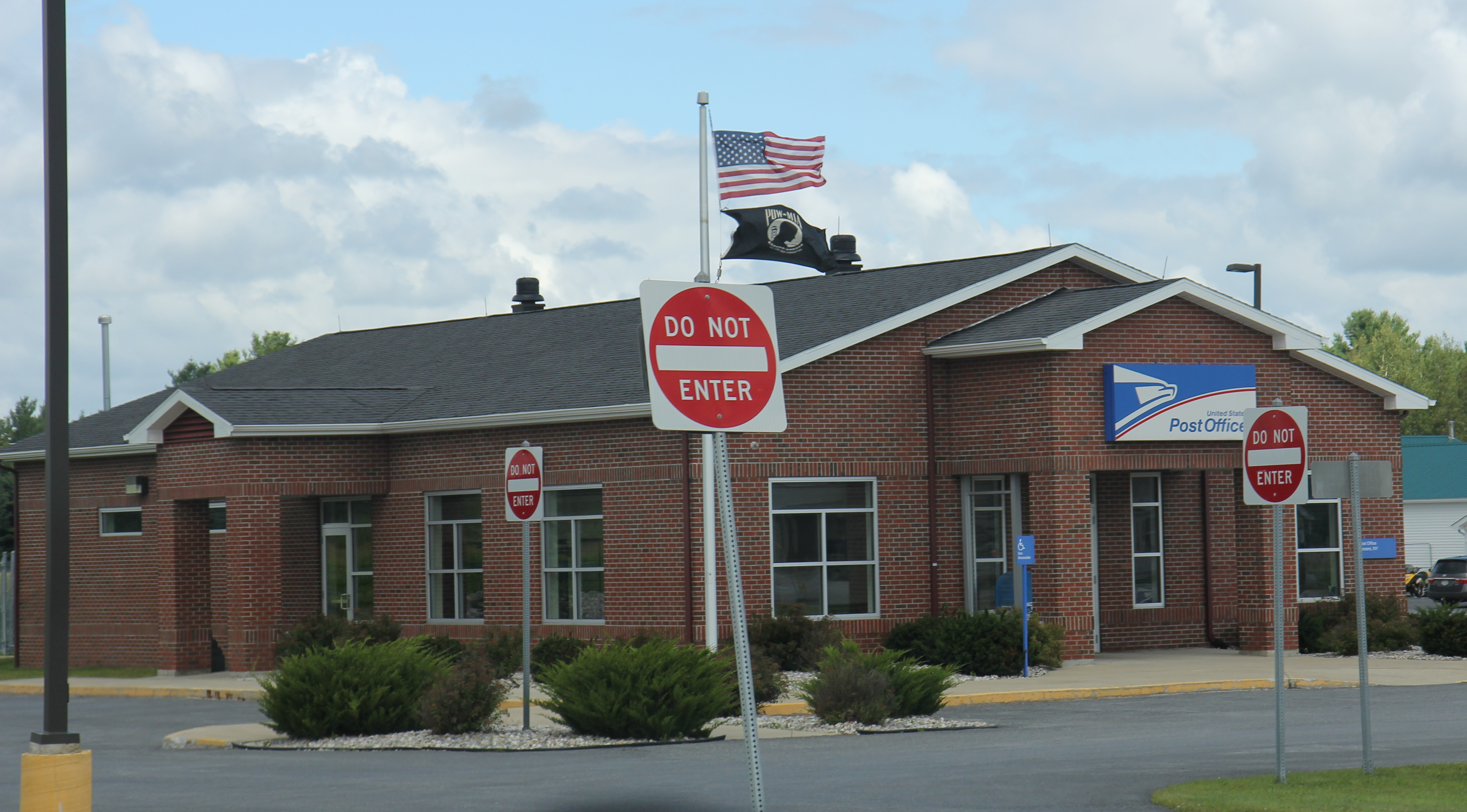
Post office for Mooers

As of the census of 2000, there were 440 people, 184 households, and 126 families residing in the CDP. The population density was 370.9 inhabitants per square mile (143.2/km^{2}). There were 212 housing units at an average density of 178.7 per square mile (69.0/km^{2}). The racial makeup of the CDP was 98.18% White, 0.23% Black or African American, 0.23% Native American, 0.23% Asian, 0.45% from other races, and 0.68% from two or more races. Hispanic or Latino of any race were 1.14% of the population.

There were 184 households, out of which 30.4% had children under the age of 18 living with them, 51.6% were married couples living together, 12.0% had a female householder with no husband present, and 31.5% were non-families. 28.8% of all households were made up of individuals, and 17.9% had someone living alone who was 65 years of age or older. The average household size was 2.39 and the average family size was 2.88.

In the CDP, the population was spread out, with 23.9% under the age of 18, 7.5% from 18 to 24, 25.2% from 25 to 44, 23.4% from 45 to 64, and 20.0% who were 65 years of age or older. The median age was 41 years. For every 100 females, there were 100.9 males. For every 100 females age 18 and over, there were 91.4 males.

The median income for a household in the CDP was $25,250, and the median income for a family was $30,817. Males had a median income of $31,071 versus $16,767 for females. The per capita income for the CDP was $14,324. About 11.1% of families and 19.2% of the population were below the poverty line, including 43.0% of those under age 18 and none of those age 65 or over.

== Education ==
The census-designated place is within the Northeastern Clinton Central School District.
