= Ellenburg Depot, New York =

- Hamlet
- Location within New York Location within the United States
- Coordinates: 44°54′21″N 73°48′04″W
- Country: United States
- State: New York
- County: Clinton
- Elevation: 873 ft (266 m)
- Time zone: UTC-5 (Eastern (EST))
  - Summer (DST): UTC-4 (EDT)
- ZIP code: 12935
- Area codes: 518 & 838
- GNIS feature ID: 949506

Ellenburg Depot is a hamlet in Clinton County, New York, United States. The community is located along U.S. Route 11, 22.3 miles (35.9 km) northwest of Plattsburgh. Ellenburg Depot has a post office with ZIP code 12935, which opened on June 29, 1859.
