= Chazy River =

Two streams in New York, U.S.

Coordinates: 44°55′13.5″N 73°24′7″W

Great Chazy River in Champlain

Chazy River is the name of two tributaries of Lake Champlain in Clinton County, New York, in the United States.

The more northerly river is the Great Chazy River, which empties into Lake Champlain at King Bay in the Town of Champlain.

The more southerly river is the Little Chazy River, which empties into Lake Champlain north of Chazy Landing in the Town of Chazy.

== See also ==
- List of New York rivers
