= Bellmont, New York =

- Town
- Location within New York Location within the United States
- Coordinates: 44°44′43″N 74°6′26″W
- Country: United States
- State: New York
- County: Franklin
- Named for: William Bell

Government
  - Type: Town Council
  - Town Supervisor: H. Bruce Russell (R)
  - Town Council: Members' List: • Harley E. Titus (R); • Wayne Rogers (R); • Ann M. Perry (D); • Rose Marshall (D)

Area
  - Total: 167.16 sq mi (432.95 km^{2})
  - Land: 164.14 sq mi (425.13 km^{2})
  - Water: 3.02 sq mi (7.82 km^{2})
- Elevation: 1,657 ft (505 m)

Population (2010)
  - Total: 1,434
  - Estimate (2016): 1,409
  - Density: 8.6/sq mi (3.31/km^{2})
- Time zone: UTC-5 (Eastern (EST))
  - Summer (DST): UTC-4 (EDT)
- ZIP Codes: 12915 (Brainardsville); 12969 (Owls Head); 12917 (Burke); 12920 (Chateaugay); 12953 (Malone)
- FIPS code: 36-033-05716
- GNIS feature ID: 0978721
- Website: www.townofbellmontny.org

Bellmont is a town in Franklin County, New York, United States. The town is on the eastern border of the county and is southeast of Malone. The population was 1,434 at the 2010 census. The town is named after William Bell, a major landowner in the early history of the town.

== History ==
Due to the slow development of northern New York state, a homestead act was passed by the legislature in 1822 to grant plots of land to settlers. The town had few settlers before that date.

The town of Bellmont was organized in 1833 from the town of Chateaugay. Additional land was attached to Bellmont from Chateaugay in 1838.

Early attempts to extract lumber from the forests met little success due to the high cost of transportation. Mining and smelting iron became a more successful activity until the deposits diminished.

William Bell, who came to Chateaugay Lake around 1783, sold 50 acres (200,000 m^{2}) to Samuel C. Drew, of Gilmanton, New Hampshire, who came to the area about 1816 and settled on the west shore of the Lower Lake. Although there were no regular settlers at that time there was a hunter's shanty near the site of the present Banner House, and Drew lived in the shanty while clearing the land and building on the west shore.

The first child born to parents of the Chateaugay Lake region was William Henry Drew, born in 1819.

Soon a large number of people followed the Drews from Gilmanton and took up land around the Lower Lake. Smith Bunker located on Bunker Hill about 1820 and gave it his name. Elias Beman, whose brother was a Revolutionary soldier in the army of General Washington, and Enoch Merrill settled on the east side of Bunker Hill, and Paul, his brother, on the west side of the Lake.

Jonathan Bellows, from South Charlestown, New Hampshire, settled here about 1820, being a direct descendant of John Bellows who was registered on the ship Hopewell from London in 1635.

At the close of the Papineau Rebellion in 1837, a group of English officers summered with Mr. Bellows on the Lower Lake, marking the probable beginning of the "summer resort" phase of this region. Bellows had a hotel called the Lake House, which by that time had grown to substantial proportions. Among those who came here for recreation purposes were A. F. Tait and Chester Harding, the artists. Here Tait had a studio and painted works such as Arguing the Point, in which there is an excellent portrait of Jonathan Bellows. Many of these pictures were lithographed by Currier and Ives. Among other famous guests were Dr. Bethums, a cousin of James Russell Lowell, and Mr. Ashman, chairman of the convention which nominated Abraham Lincoln.

In 1892, the Lake House was purchased by J. S. Kirby who changed the name to "Banner House". Following his death the place was operated by F. W. Adams.

The first sawmill was built by Gates Hoit in 1828 at the outlet of the lower lake near the present dam. The mill was soon purchased by John B. Jackson, who later erected a larger mill on the west shore.

In 1874, Pope, William & Company built a forge at what was then Moffits. The iron ore was brought down from Lyon Mountain mostly by barges and was of unusual quality. Most of it went into the manufacture of Bessemer steel and was much sought after by steel manufacturers. In 1880 a new company was formed with a capital of $1,500,000. They enlarged the forge to sixteen fires, making the largest "Catalan" forge in the world. This forge and its sixteen fires consumed annually 37,500 cords of wood, which made 1,500,000 bushels of charcoal. This forge operation lasted until 1893.

Among other places where ore was found was one above the hotel owned by Lewis Bellows. He and Edgar Keeler, of Chateaugay, operated a mine back of the hotel for a year and took out about a thousand tons of ore. The mine was finally abandoned owing to the large amount of sulfur found in the ore.

Another mine was located on land owned by Alanson Roberts. He built a separator on Thurber Brook, where he separated some amount of ore. Later another separator was built near Lewis Bellows house, but finally both were abandoned. The shaft of the old Bellows mine still exists and is a point of interest to its present-day tourists.

Chateaugay Lake has always drawn those interested in fishing and hunting; the region abounded in speckled and rainbow trout as well as deer and bear. Among those who came to hunt or fish and built cottages on the lakes were Geraldine Farrar, the singer, as well as Jack Clifford and Evelyn Nesbitt Thaw. Seth Thomas of clock fame built a cottage with a high tower containing a huge three-sided clock, which could be seen for miles around.

During the early days, long before the advent of automobiles, there was a stage route from Chateaugay to the Banner House landing. From here a small steamer— first the Adirondack and later the Emma— made regular trips up through the Narrows and around the Upper Lake, stopping at every dock to deliver mail and supplies. The arrival of this little steamer was the high spot in the day's activities at all the camps. People felt a personal responsibility in meeting the boat and getting the latest news. The stage that came from Chateaugay was also an "institution", and Pratt Hill, the driver, was well known throughout the area.

Soon the coming of private launches in large numbers made the regular streamer trips unnecessary, and they were abandoned. Most of the campers then kept boats or launches at the M. S. Bellows boat shop and from there went the rest of the way by water. Soon roads began to improve and again a change in the matter of boats. Campers now took the new road up along the lakeshore and stopped near their camps. This made the need for launches much less, and they soon dwindled in number.

Cottages have so increased that there is almost no unoccupied space on the east side of the lower lake, and shorefront values climb higher and higher each year.

The First Union Protestant Church of Mountain View was listed on the National Register of Historic Places in 2005.

== Notable person ==
- Smith Mead Weed, attorney, businessman, and member of the New York State Assembly.

== Geography ==
According to the United States Census Bureau, the town has a total area of 167.1 square miles (432.9 km^{2}), of which 164.1 square miles (425.1 km^{2}) is land and 3.0 square miles (7.8 km^{2}), or 1.81%, is water.

The eastern town line is the border of Clinton County. The southern section of the town is inside the Adirondack Park.

New York State Route 190 intersects New York State Route 374 in the northeastern corner of the town at Brainardsville.

The Châteauguay River flows northward from Lower Chateaugay Lake, which is at the eastern town line. Lower Chateaugay Lake is connected to Upper Chateaugay Lake, in Clinton County, by the Chateaugay Narrows.

== Demographics ==
Historical population
| Census | Pop. | Note | %± |
|---|---|---|---|
| 1840 | 472 | | — |
| 1850 | 660 | | 39.8% |
| 1860 | 1,376 | | 108.5% |
| 1870 | 1,619 | | 17.7% |
| 1880 | 2,098 | | 29.6% |
| 1890 | 2,263 | | 7.9% |
| 1900 | 2,414 | | 6.7% |
| 1910 | 2,341 | | −3.0% |
| 1920 | 1,552 | | −33.7% |
| 1930 | 1,303 | | −16.0% |
| 1940 | 1,279 | | −1.8% |
| 1950 | 1,186 | | −7.3% |
| 1960 | 1,088 | | −8.3% |
| 1970 | 1,055 | | −3.0% |
| 1980 | 1,045 | | −0.9% |
| 1990 | 1,246 | | 19.2% |
| 2000 | 1,423 | | 14.2% |
| 2010 | 1,434 | | 0.8% |
| 2016 (est.) | 1,409 | | −1.7% |
U.S. Decennial Census

As of the census of 2000, there were 1,423 people, 573 households, and 395 families residing in the town. The population density was 8.7 inhabitants per square mile (3.4/km^{2}). There were 1,261 housing units at an average density of 7.7 per square mile (3.0/km^{2}). The racial makeup of the town was 97.68% White, 0.07% African American, 0.84% Native American, 0.49% Asian, 0.07% from other races, and 0.84% from two or more races. Hispanic or Latino of any race were 0.28% of the population.

There were 573 households, out of which 30.2% had children under the age of 18 living with them, 57.2% were married couples living together, 5.9% had a female householder with no husband present, and 30.9% were non-families. 23.9% of all households were made up of individuals, and 8.7% had someone living alone who was 65 years of age or older. The average household size was 2.47 and the average family size was 2.88.

In the town, the population was spread out, with 24.7% under the age of 18, 6.1% from 18 to 24, 27.1% from 25 to 44, 28.5% from 45 to 64, and 13.6% who were 65 years of age or older. The median age was 39 years. For every 100 females, there were 104.5 males. For every 100 females age 18 and over, there were 102.3 males.

The median income for a household in the town was $33,417, and the median income for a family was $35,852. Males had a median income of $32,750 versus $19,879 for females. The per capita income for the town was $16,542. About 6.3% of families and 9.8% of the population were below the poverty line, including 9.2% of those under age 18 and 13.0% of those age 65 or over.

== Communities and locations in Bellmont ==
- Bellmont Center – A hamlet by the northern town line by the junction of County Roads 24 and 33.
- Brainardsville (briefly known as "Crompville") – A hamlet in the northeastern corner of the town at the junction of NY-190, NY-374, and County Road 24.
- Bryants Mill – A hamlet in the southern part of the town, south of Mountain View.
- Camp Chateaugay – A summer lake camp on Upper Chateaugay Lake.
- Chateaugay Lake (aka Weeds, aka Moffits, aka Popeville, aka The Forge) – A former "boom town" near the northern end of Lower Chateaugay Lake and one of the early communities in the town, now abandoned.
- Indian Lake – A small lake in the southwestern section of the town.
- Middle Kilns – A location in the southeastern part of the town, northeast of Wolf Pond.
- Mountain View (formerly "State Dam") – A hamlet in the southwestern part of the town on County Road 27 and west of Indian Lake.
- Owls Head – A hamlet in the southwestern section of the town on County Road 27.
- Porcaville – A location in the southwestern corner of the town on County Road 27.
- Ragged Lake – A small lake east of Indian Lake, once the site of a tourist hotel.
- Upper Kilns – A location in the southeastern part of the town.
- Wolf Pond – A hamlet in the southern part of the town, near the town line, and southeast of Mountain View and Bryants Mill.
