= List of county routes in Clinton County, New York =

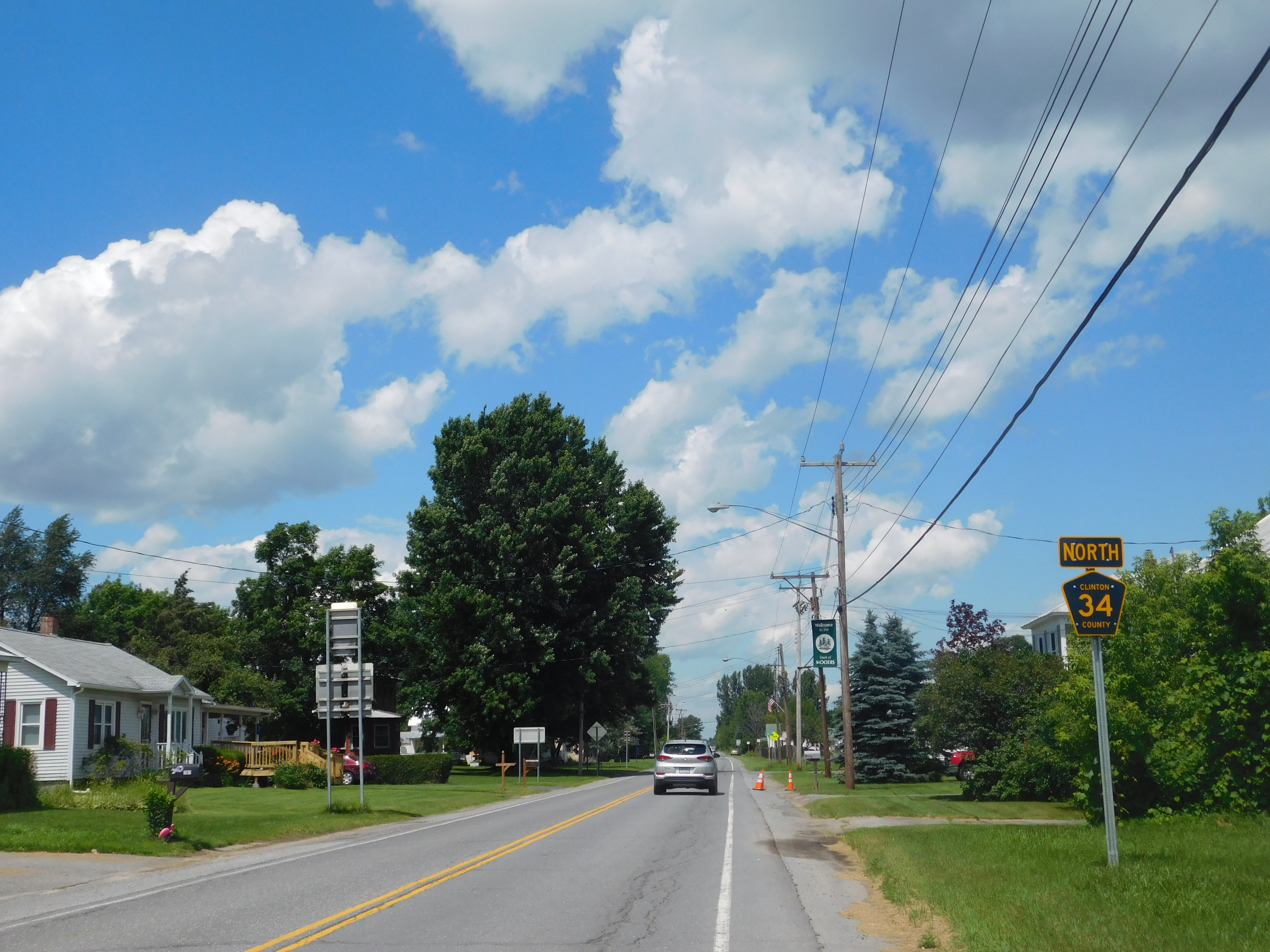
- CR 34 in Mooers, the former alignment of NY 22.

Highway names
- Interstates: Interstate X (I-X)
- US Highways: U.S. Route X (US X)
- State: New York State Route X (NY X)
- County: County Route X (CR X)

System links
- New York Highways; Interstate; US; State; Reference; Parkways

County routes in Clinton County, New York, were not signed in any form, until 2015 when it began adding the blue pentagon route shields, serving as little more than references for inventory purposes. CR 45–56 served as spurs to the county's recycling facilities.

== Routes 1–30 ==
Route	Length (mi)	Length (km)	From	Via	To	Notes
CR 1	32.53	52.35	NY 9N in Black Brook	North Main Street and Silver Lake and Standish roads	NY 374 in Dannemora	Includes McCrea, Shaw, and Palmer streets in Thomasville
CR 1A	1.91	3.07	CR 1	Nelson Road in Black Brook	CR 1	
CR 2	12.72	20.47	NY 374 in Dannemora	Bradley Pond and Brandy Brook roads	US 11 in Clinton	
CR 3	14.18	22.82	CR 1 in Black Brook	Guide Board and Ore Bed roads	NY 3 in Saranac	
CR 4	3.12	5.02	Franklin County line	Union Falls Road in Black Brook	CR 1	
CR 5	8.72	14.03	Franklin County line (becomes CR 54)	West Hill and Ellenburg Center roads in Ellenburg	NY 190	Former routing of NY 190
CR 6	6.75	10.86	CR 8	Smith Road in Ellenburg	CR 5	
CR 7	4.54	7.31	US 11	Gagnier and Campbell roads in Clinton	US 11	
CR 8	23.06	37.11	NY 374 in Dannemora	Plank, Caanan, Clinton Mills, and Looby roads	US 11 in Clinton	
CR 9	7.70	12.39	US 11	Lost Nation and Frontier roads in Clinton	NY 189	
CR 10	6.06	9.75	US 11	Cannon Corners Road in Mooers	Canada–US border (becomes QC 203)	
CR 11	2.26	3.64	NY 190 in Altona	Forest Road	US 11 in Mooers	
CR 12	5.62	9.04	Terrien Road in Altona	Alder Bend Road	US 11 in Mooers	
CR 13	2.59	4.17	CR 12	Irona Road in Altona	CR 16	
CR 14	5.28	8.50	CR 10	Davison Road in Mooers	US 11	
CR 15	6.78	10.91	CR 23 in Altona	Joe Wood and Gilbert roads	NY 22 in Mooers	
CR 16	31.18	50.18	NY 22B in Schuyler Falls	Mason, Rand Hill, Devils Den, Woods Falls, and Blackman Corners roads	Dead end at the Canada–US border in Mooers	
CR 16A	0.22	0.35	CR 16	Emory Street in Schuyler Falls	NY 22B	Decommissioned by 2016.
CR 17	4.52	7.27	US 11	Perry Mills Road in Champlain	Champlain village line	Former routing of US 11
CR 19	3.53	5.68	CR 21	Ridge Road in Champlain	US 11	
CR 20	3.14	5.05	CR 23 in Chazy	Angelville	CR 21 in Mooers	
CR 21	7.58	12.20	US 11 in Mooers	Lavalley Road	US 9 in Champlain	
CR 22	17.57	28.28	US 9 in Beekmantown	Point Au Roche, Lake Shore, and Mason roads	US 11 / NY 276 in Champlain	Discontinuous at NY 9B
CR 23	14.61	23.51	CR 16 in Altona	Miner Farm Road	CR 22 in Chazy	Discontinuous at US 9; formerly overlapped with NY 191 between NY 22 and US 9; remainder of route was formerly part of NY 191
CR 24	10.07	16.21	NY 190 in Altona	Recore Road, West Church Street, and Fiske Road	US 9 in Chazy	Part north of NY 22 was formerly NY 348
CR 25 (1)	4.08	6.57	CR 24 in Chazy	Stratton Hill Road	US 9 in Beekmantown	Includes north–south connector (Ingraham Road) with US 9 at east end
CR 25 (2)	1.75	2.82	CR 25 (segment 1)	Reynolds Road in Chazy	CR 22	
CR 26 (1)	2.87	4.62	NY 190	Tom Miller Road in Plattsburgh	Plattsburgh city line	
CR 26 (2)	0.28	0.45	Cul-de-sac	Reeves Lane in Plattsburgh	Rugar Street	
CR 27	3.27	5.26	NY 190	Duquette and O'Neil roads in Beekmantown	NY 22	
CR 28	5.74	9.24	NY 374 in Dannemora	General Leroy Manor Road	CR 16 in Beekmantown	
CR 29	9.86	15.87	NY 3 in Saranac	Chazy Lake Road	NY 374 in Dannemora	
CR 30	3.60	5.79	NY 3	Picketts Corners Road in Saranac	Dannemora village line	

== Routes 31 and up ==
Route	Length (mi)	Length (km)	From	Via	To	Notes
CR 31	11.48	18.48	NY 3 in Saranac	Hardscrabble, Rabideau, Shingle Street, and Sand roads	NY 22B in Schuyler Falls	
CR 31S	0.20	0.32	CR 31 in Schuyler Falls	Harney Branch Road	NY 3 in Plattsburgh	
CR 32	4.19	6.74	NY 22B in Schuyler Falls	Irish Settlement Road	NY 22 in Plattsburgh	Eastern terminus near exit 36 on the Adirondack Northway
CR 33	14.48	23.30	CR 3 in Black Brook	Peasleeville, Norrisville, and Salmon River roads	NY 22 in Plattsburgh	
CR 34	3.44	5.54	US 11	Hemmingford Road in Mooers	Canada–US border	Entire length formerly overlapped with NY 22
CR 35	3.40	5.47	CR 33	Peasleeville Road in Peru	CR 40	
CR 36	1.54	2.48	CR 40	Mannix Road in Peru	NY 22B	
CR 37	3.47	5.58	CR 40	River Road in Peru	NY 22B	
CR 38	3.80	6.12	CR 41	Arthur and Chasm roads in Au Sable	US 9	
CR 39	9.78	15.74	NY 9N in Au Sable	Clintonville, Harkness, and Union roads	NY 22 in Peru	
CR 39A	1.02	1.64	Dry Bridge Trail	Dry Bridge Road in Au Sable	CR 39	
CR 40	10.26	16.51	CR 41 in Au Sable	Hallock Hill, Calkins, Clark, and Felton roads	NY 22B in Schuyler Falls	
CR 41	3.42	5.50	Keeseville former village line	Hill Street and Hallock Hill and Union roads in Au Sable	CR 39	
CR 42	1.49	2.40	Keeseville former village line	Grove Street in Au Sable	CR 38	
CR 43	3.91	6.29	CR 16	North Star Road in Mooers	CR 34	
CR 45	0.20	0.32	CR 39A	Road to Ausable Convenience Station in Au Sable	Dead end	Decommissioned by 2016.
CR 46	0.42	0.68	CR 31	Road to Schuyler Falls Landfill in Schuyler Falls	Dead end	Decommissioned by 2016.
CR 47	0.51	0.82	CR 43	Road to Mooers Transfer Station in Mooers	Dead end	Decommissioned by 2016.
CR 48	0.13	0.21	Reservoir Road	Road to Peru Convenience Station in Peru	Cul-de-sac	Decommissioned by 2016.
CR 49	0.30	0.48	CR 3	Road to Saranac Convenience Station in Black Brook	Cul-de-sac	Decommissioned by 2016.
CR 50	0.13	0.21	NY 374	Road to Lyon Mountain Convenience Station in Dannemora	Cul-de-sac	Decommissioned by 2016.
CR 51	0.14	0.23	CR 28	Road to Dannemora Convenience Station in Dannemora	Cul-de-sac	Decommissioned by 2016.
CR 52	0.10	0.16	CR 8	Road to Churubusco Convenience Station in Clinton	Cul-de-sac	Decommissioned by 2016.
CR 53	0.05	0.08	NY 190	Road to Ellenburg Convenience Station in Ellenburg	Cul-de-sac	Decommissioned by 2016.
CR 54	0.48	0.77	CR 23	Road to Altona Convenience Station in Altona	Cul-de-sac	Decommissioned by 2016.
CR 55	0.17	0.27	McCrea Road	Road to Champlain Convenience Station in Champlain	Cul-de-sac	Decommissioned by 2016.
CR 56	0.15	0.24	Esker Road	Road to Chazy Convenience Station in Chazy	Cul-de-sac	Decommissioned by 2016.
CR 57	4.24	6.82	US 9	Commodore Thomas MacDonough Highway in Plattsburgh	Grand Isle–Plattsburgh Ferry landing	Entire length formerly overlapped with NY 314
CR 58	3.25	5.23	NY 22	Spellman Road in Beekmantown	US 9	Entire length formerly overlapped with NY 456

== See also ==
- County routes in New York
