= Mooers–Hemmingford Border Crossing =

Canada–United States border crossing

Mooers-Hemmingford Border Crossing
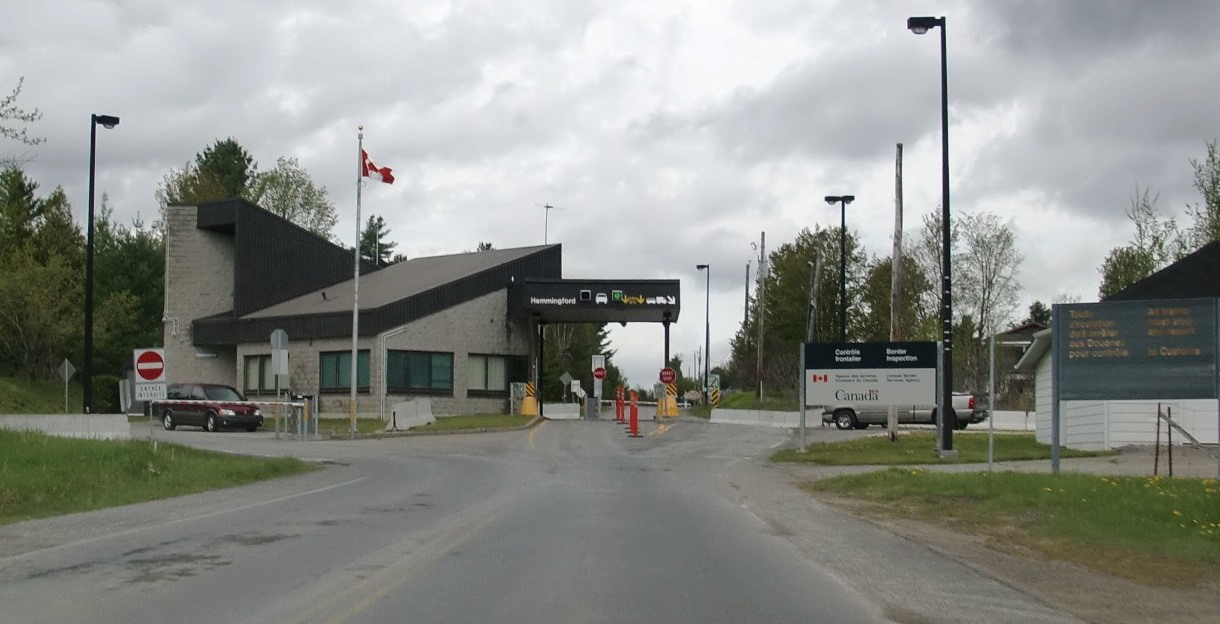
- Hemmingford, Quebec Border Inspection Station

Location
- Country: United States; Canada
- Location: R-219 / Hemmingford Road; US Port: 1511 Hemmingford Rd, Mooers, New York 12958; Canadian Port: 1 Route 219 South, Hemmingford, Quebec JOL 1HO
- Coordinates: 45.004459°N 73.602991°W

Details
- Opened: 1935

Website
- https://www.cbp.gov/contact/ports/champlain
- U.S. Inspection Station—Mooers, New York
- U.S. National Register of Historic Places
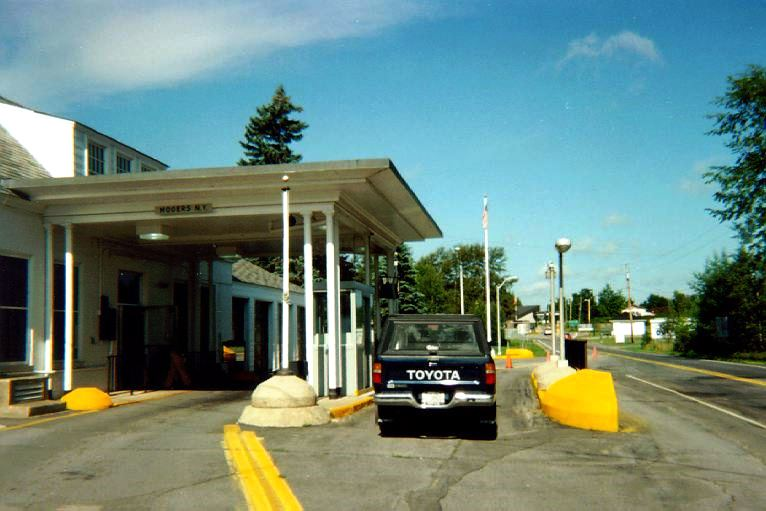
- US Border Inspection Station at Mooers as seen in 1996

- Location within New York Location within the United States
- Location: Hemmingford Road, Mooers, New York
- Area: 3.5 acres (1.4 ha)
- Built: 1932
- Architect: Simon, Louis A.; Wetmore, James A.
- Architectural style: Colonial Revival
- MPS: U.S. Border Inspection Stations MPS
- NRHP reference No.: 14000572
- Added to NRHP: September 10, 2014

The Mooers–Hemmingford Border Crossing connects the towns of Hemmingford, Quebec, to Mooers, New York, on the Canada–US border. It can be reached by Quebec Route 219 on the Canadian side and by Hemmingford Road (former New York State Route 22) on the American side. This crossing is open 24 hours per day, 365 days per year. The US government is still using the same border station it did when the crossing was first established in 1935. In 2014, the building was listed on the U.S. National Register of Historic Places.

== Mooers Border Inspection station ==
=== Architectural description ===
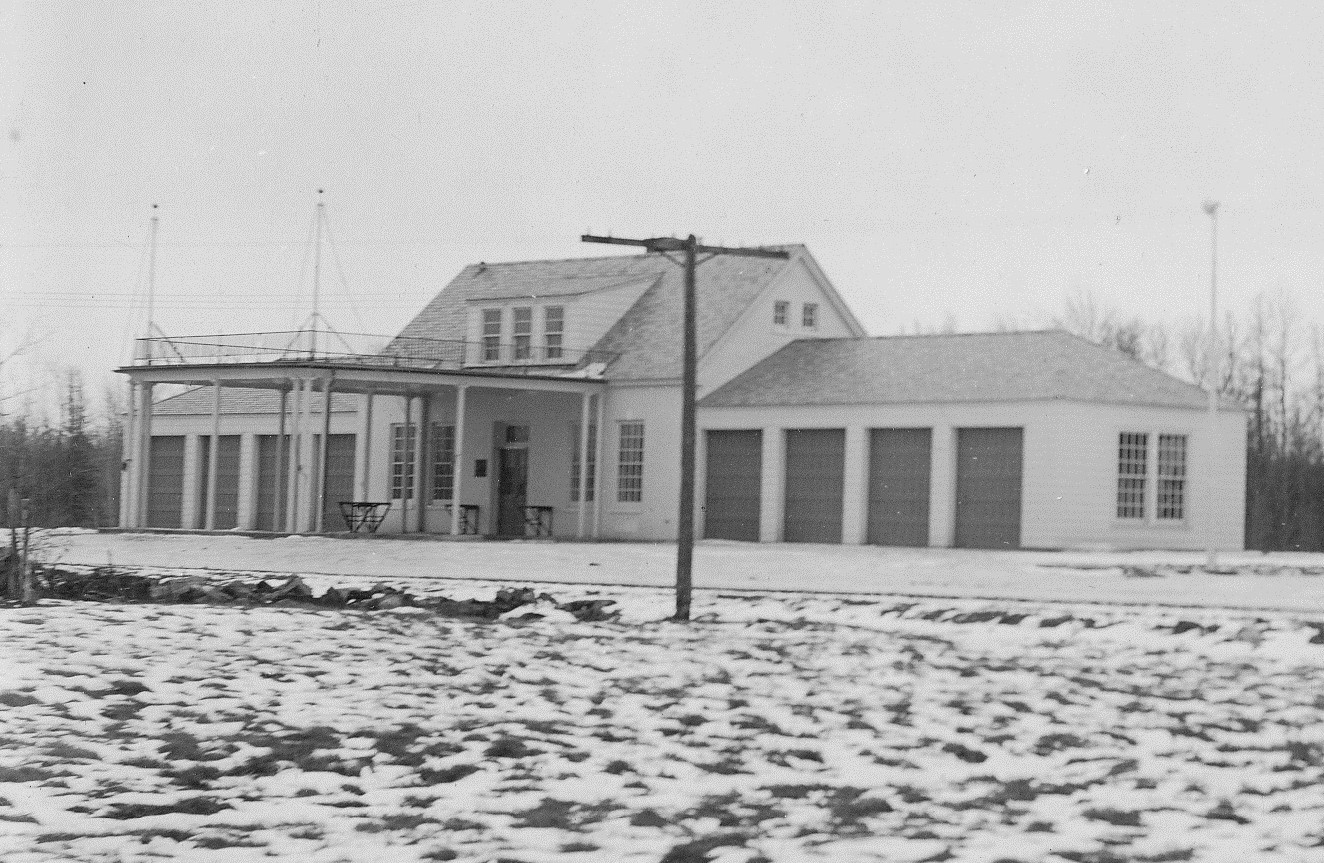
Mooers NY border station as seen in 1933

The Mooers Border Inspection station is located on the west side State Route 22, in Mooers, New York, on a 142,550-square-foot lot. Set in an agricultural area, the station faces woodland and open fields on the east. The Canadian inspection station is within sight to the north. Cars are directed to the station from the north via an oval drive from the road. The site has been landscaped in a formal arrangement typically found at border stations with a series of approximately six evergreen trees spaced across the side and rear yard. An original landscaping plan called for spirea, barberry and weigila bushes together with Colorado spruce trees. The latter are still in place. There is a provision for parking south of the station.

The Inspection Station is part of a three-building complex with two residences, for customs and immigrations inspectors, which are located about fifty feet north-west and south-west of the station.

The station is three-part in plan with a 1 1/2-story, white-painted brick central block and two single story weatherboarded wings on the north and south. The central block is five bays wide beneath a steeply pitched, end gable, slate roof. There are shed-roof dormers on the east and west sides of the roof, and one interior brick chimney. Windows are 12/12 sash on the first floor and 8/8 sash in the second-floor dormers. There is a glass-and-aluminum replacement entry from 1953 on the east with a single leaf door beneath a transom.

The wings are four bays long and one bay wide under hipped, slate-covered roofs. The south wing is an inspection shed for vehicles, and that on the north is a garage for government vehicles. All four garage bays on the south have been filled in: two were sealed with dummy paneled doors, one enclosed with a pedestrian door, the fourth with a pair of handicap-accessible bathrooms entered beneath a door hood. There is a new wooden overhead door at the end of this wing. On the north wing, four bays have new wood overhead garage doors. Its end bay retains the paired 12/12 sash. The west facades of both wings have three and four bays of 12/12 sash.

A single-lane inspection canopy on steel-capped columns extends from the main block of the building at eaves level. It is an enlarged and raised 1972 replacement of the original, and is flanked on north and south with two flagpoles.

On the first-floor interior, a vestibule is formed by two parallel panelled counters on left and right of the entry. These are the only counters among the seven stations to have their original oak tops. There are two small bathrooms directly across from the entry to the right of a stair which connects the basement to the second floor. Partitions with glass windows and transoms divide each side of the floor space into offices and an open area. Interior finishes are typical for the border stations, with plaster walls, architrave door surrounds, picture rail, and baseboards defining the spaces. The public space retains its original red tile floors inlaid in cement, but the office spaces have linoleum laid over the wood floors. The two bathrooms have their original white tiled and plaster walls and some fixtures. Their terrazzo floors were added in 1967. Original lighting fixtures on the first floor have been replaced with ceiling-mounted fluorescent fixtures.

The cement-floored basement is divided into two mechanical rooms and a storage/mechanical room. The second floor has hardwood floors. The floor is divided into an office which was a search room originally, and two side-by-side detention rooms with their original plumbing fixtures. Original five-panel doors remain.

=== US Inspector's residence ===
The clapboard-covered inspector's residence located on the southwest corner of the property is a single-story structure set on high reinforced-concrete foundations. It has an end gable, slate-covered roof with a center chimney, and is Neo-colonial in style. Five bays wide and two bays deep for a rectangular plan, the building is vacant and the windows are now sealed, but early photographs of similar residences at Chateaugay indicate that they were 6/6 sash. There is a half-round window in the attic space in each gable end. The east porch is enclosed. It has paired three-light fixed sash and is topped with an ornamental wood railing. At the building's northwest corner is a secondary entrance which is a recessed porch framed by pilasters. It is reached as on the east porch by a set of wooden stairs. Five ornamental shrubs are set close to the house.

The building has been sealed so the interior was not seen.

=== Construction history and space inventory ===
==== Building details ====
	Square footage	Building dimensions	
Floor area total:	3680	Stories/levels:	2
First floor area:	2310	Perimeter:	305(linear ft.)
Occupiable area:	0	Depth:	0(linear ft.)
	Height:	26(linear ft.)	
	Length:	0(linear ft.)	

==== Construction history ====
Start year	End year	Description	Architect
1932	0	Original construction	
1953	0	Stair change, new doorway	GSA
1964	0	Basement exits	GSA
1964	0	Electrical modernization	GSA
1967	0	Install emergency generator equipment	GSA
1972	0	Canopy repair and misc. improvements	GSA

=== Mooers Border Inspector's residence ===
==== Building details ====
	Square footage	Building dimensions	
Floor area total:	0	Stories/Levels:	1
First floor area:	500	Perimeter:	0(linear ft.)
Occupiable area:	0	Depth:	0(linear ft.)
	Height:	20(linear ft.)	
	Length:	0(linear ft.)	

==== Construction history ====
	Start year	End year	Description	Architect
1932	0	Original construction		
1964	0	Electrical modernizations	GSA	
1966	0	Misc. building modernizations	GSA	

=== US border station architectural significance ===
The Mooers Border Inspection Station in Mooers, New York, is one of seven existing border inspection stations built between 1931 and 1934 along the New York–Canada border. Colonial Revival in style, the building was designed by Louis A. Simon, Superintending Architect of the Architectural Division of the Treasury, and constructed in 1932. Border stations were constructed by the federal government in the New England states along the border with Canada during the 1930s and several common plans and elevations can be discerned among the remaining stations. Mooers shares with the others a residential scale, a Neocolonial style, and an organization to accommodate functions of both customs and immigration services.

Border Stations are associated with four important events in United States history: the imposition of Prohibition between 1919 and 1933; enactment of the Elliott-Fernald public buildings act in 1926 which was followed closely by the Depression; and the growth of the automobile whose price was increasingly affordable thanks to Henry Ford's creation of the industrial assembly line. The stations were constructed as part of the government's program to improve its public buildings and to control casual smuggling of alcohol which most often took place in cars crossing the border. Their construction was also seen as a means of giving work to the many locally unemployed.

The Mooers border inspection station is an example of the more modest, rural version of the border stations also found at Chateaugay, Champlain (Meridian Road), Fort Covington, New York and West Berkshire, Vermont. While the stations have all sustained systematic alterations, they have retained, in varying degrees, most of their original fabric. This station is on both exterior and interior a good example of the building type, but of the five similar stations, it has had the second greatest number of alterations. It is one of two stations to retain its inspector's residences and they are the better preserved of the two stations.

The inspector's residence is one of two inspector's residences at the Mooers Border Inspection station. Three of the seven border inspection stations in New York were constructed as complexes with residences, but only two of the complexes are intact, and of the two, these appear to be in better condition. The mirror-image residences were designed to be stylistically complementary to the station, but to be more modest than the station buildings themselves. An effort was made by the Supervising Architect's Office to design the buildings of the inspection stations to be compatible with the region in which they were built. Here a New England cape style house was the inspiration. Even though a standard design was developed for these residences, comparison of construction photographs and original drawings, which are kept in the inspection station at Chateaugay, point out that some changes were made to the design during construction, mainly at the entries.

=== History ===
The era of Prohibition begun in 1919 with the Volstead Act and extended nationwide by the ratification of the Eighteenth Amendment to the United States Constitution in 1920, resulted in massive bootlegging along the Canada–US border. In New York, early efforts to control bootlegging were carried out by a small number of Customs officers and border patrol officers who were often on foot and horseback. In many cases, New York Custom Houses were a mile or so south of the border and travelers were expected to stop in and report their purchases. The opportunity to remedy this situation and support enforcement of the Prohibition laws was offered by enactment of the Elliott-Fernald public buildings act of 1926 which authorized the government through the Treasury Department to accelerate its building program and began its allocation with $150,000,000 which it later increased considerably.

Mooers was a part of so-called Rum Trail which made Route 9 the chief path of entry for bootlegged liquor in upstate New York. Bootleggers ran liquor across the border at Mooers and followed Route 22 through West Chazy into Plattsburgh. At the time Prohibition was repealed, the Mooers border inspection station had just been completed. However, the end of Prohibition did not mean the end of smuggling, as the public had developed a taste for Canadian liquor and its bootleggers had discovered the money that could be made smuggling raw alcohol into Canada where prices for it were considerably higher. Mooers continued to operate to interdict this activity.

While the seven New York border inspection stations had been designated for construction as early as 1929, land acquisition and the designing and bidding process was stalled at various stages for each of the buildings and their construction took place unevenly over a period of five years. Mooers was the last station to be constructed. It is still in active use, although the residences are unoccupied.

=== Statement of Eligibility for the National Register of Historic Places ===
The Mooers Border Inspection Station is one of seven border stations in New York which are eligible for the National Register according to Criteria A, B and C. The stations have national, state and local significance.

The station is associated with three events which converged to make a significant contribution to the broad patterns of our history: Prohibition, the Public Buildings Act of 1926 and the mass-production of automobiles. Although this border station was not completed until a year before the repeal of Prohibition, it was planned and built as a response to the widespread bootlegging which took place along the border with Canada and continued to serve as important role after 1933 when smuggling continued in both directions across the border. The station has been in active use for sixty years.

Conceived in a period of relative prosperity, the Public Buildings Act came to have greater importance to the country during the Depression and funding was accelerated to bring stimulus to state and local economies by putting to work many of the unemployed in building and then manning the stations. Local accounts make clear the number of jobs the station created. Local labor was used to build the station and Mooers residents were appointed customs inspectors.

The Mooers Border Inspection Station is associated with the life of Louis A. Simon, FAIA, who as Superintendent of the Architect's Office and then as Supervising Architect of the Procurement Division of the United States Treasury Department was responsible for the design of hundreds of government buildings between 1905 and 1939. During his long tenure with the government, Simon, trained in architecture at MIT, was instrumental in the image of the government projected by its public buildings, an image derived from classical western architecture, filtered perhaps through the English Georgian style or given a regional gloss, but one which continues to operate in the collective public vision of government. Simon was unwavering in his defense of what he considered a "conservative-progressive" approach to design in which he saw "art, beauty, symmetry, harmony and rhythm". The debate which his approach stirred in the architectural profession may still be observed in the fact that he is often omitted in architectural reference works.

The border inspection stations do not individually possess high artistic values, but they do represent a distinguishable entity, that of United States Border Stations [and in this case Border Station and Inspection Residences] whose components are nonetheless of artistic value. This station at Mooers is a good example of the choice of a Neocolonial style which was considered appropriate for the upstate New York region. The fact that its roof pitch is steeper than its Vermont counterparts suggests the station was adapted to reflect the state's Dutch stylistic heritage. Its construction is of the highest quality materials and workmanship. It has integrity of setting and feeling associated with its function, and has with few exceptions retained the integrity of its materials.

There is no evidence that the site has yielded or may be likely to yield information important in prehistory or history.

== See also ==
- List of Canada–United States border crossings
- National Register of Historic Places listings in Clinton County, New York
