= Brainardsville, New York =

- Hamlet
- Location within New York Location within the United States
- Coordinates: 44°51′28″N 74°02′01″W
- Country: United States
- State: New York
- County: Franklin
- Elevation: 1,342 ft (409 m)
- Time zone: UTC-5 (Eastern (EST))
  - Summer (DST): UTC-4 (EDT)
- ZIP code: 12915
- Area codes: 518 & 838
- GNIS feature ID: 944604

Brainardsville is a hamlet in Franklin County, New York, United States. The community is located at the intersection of New York State Route 190 and New York State Route 374, 5.3 miles (8.5 km) south-southeast of Chateaugay. Brainardsville has a post office with ZIP code 12915.
