= Ellenburg, New York =

- Town
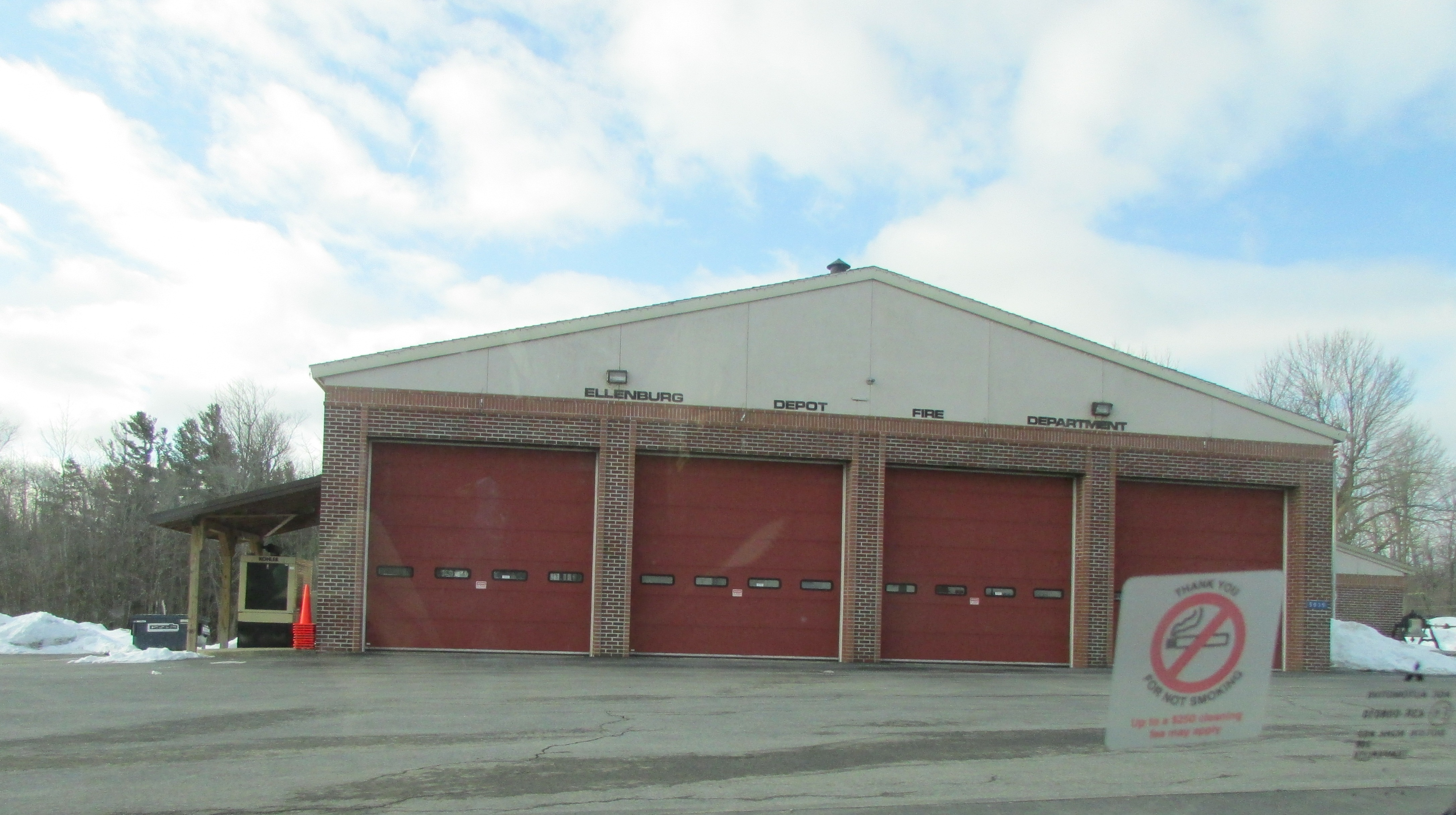
- Ellenburg Fire Department

- Location in Clinton County and the state of New York.
- Coordinates: 44°50′56″N 73°55′2″W
- Country: United States
- State: New York
- County: Clinton

Government
  - Type: Town Council
  - Town Supervisor: Jason Dezan
  - Town Council: Members' List: • Curtis E. DeCoste (R); • Alan Thibeau (D); • Gerald Peets (D); • Dennis F. LaBombard (D)

Area
  - Total: 107.46 sq mi (278.31 km^{2})
  - Land: 106.57 sq mi (276.01 km^{2})
  - Water: 0.89 sq mi (2.30 km^{2})
- Elevation: 1,398 ft (426 m)

Population (2020)
  - Total: 1,842
  - Density: 17.1/sq mi (6.62/km^{2})
- Time zone: UTC-5 (Eastern (EST))
  - Summer (DST): UTC-4 (EDT)
- ZIP Codes: 12933 (Ellenburg); 12934 (Ellenburg Center); 12935 (Ellenburg Depot); 12955 (Lyon Mountain); 12920 (Chateaugay)
- Area code: 518
- FIPS code: 36-019-23921
- GNIS feature ID: 0978931
- Website: www.townofellenburgny.gov

Ellenburg is a town in Clinton County, New York, United States. The population was 1,842 at the 2020 census. The town is named after the daughter of the principal proprietor. Ellenburg is on the western border of the county and is northwest of Plattsburgh. The southern part of the town is situated in the Adirondack Park.

== History ==
The area was first settled around 1800. Ellenburg is named for Ellen Murray, the daughter of John R. Murray, a landowner.

The town was formed from part of the town of Mooers in 1830. In 1845, part of the town was used to make the town of Clinton.

During the Cold War, Ellenburg was the location of two of the twelve Atlas ICBM missile silos under the 556th Strategic Missile Squadron based out of the Plattsburgh Air Force Base. These silos were operational from 1962 to 1965.

In late 2004, a wind farm was proposed by Noble Environmental Power for the northern part of the town. Construction was expected to be completed by early 2007, but due to delays it began in the spring of 2008. Noble has also built wind farms in the neighboring towns of Altona and Chateaugay. Construction of the wind farms caused some controversy within the towns, as many residents felt it would subtract from the natural beauty of the area. The wind farm includes 54 turbines producing a total output of 81 megawatts.

== Geography ==
According to the United States Census Bureau, the town has a total area of 107.5 square miles (278.3 km^{2}), of which 106.6 square miles (276.0 km^{2}) is land, and 0.89 square miles (2.3 km^{2}), or 0.83%, is water.

The western town line is the border of Franklin County.

U.S. Route 11 passes through the northeastern part of the town. New York State Route 190 (Military Turnpike) is an east-west highway, intersecting US-11 at Ellenburg village. New York State Route 374 crosses the southwestern corner of the town.

=== Climate ===
Climate data for Ellenburg Depot, 1991–2020 normals: 950ft (290m)
Month	Jan	Feb	Mar	Apr	May	Jun	Jul	Aug	Sep	Oct	Nov	Dec	Year
Record high °F (°C)	64 (18)	67 (19)	79 (26)	84 (29)	92 (33)	100 (38)	97 (36)	97 (36)	93 (34)	80 (27)	75 (24)	68 (20)	100 (38)
Mean maximum °F (°C)	50.4 (10.2)	48.9 (9.4)	58.3 (14.6)	74.6 (23.7)	84.2 (29.0)	89.2 (31.8)	91.2 (32.9)	89.0 (31.7)	85.6 (29.8)	75.6 (24.2)	64.9 (18.3)	53.8 (12.1)	89.3 (31.8)
Mean daily maximum °F (°C)	26.1 (−3.3)	28.3 (−2.1)	37.5 (3.1)	51.4 (10.8)	65.1 (18.4)	73.7 (23.2)	78.2 (25.7)	76.2 (24.6)	69.3 (20.7)	55.9 (13.3)	43.6 (6.4)	31.7 (−0.2)	53.1 (11.7)
Daily mean °F (°C)	16.4 (−8.7)	18.6 (−7.4)	28.1 (−2.2)	41.4 (5.2)	54.5 (12.5)	63.5 (17.5)	68.4 (20.2)	66.1 (18.9)	58.7 (14.8)	46.8 (8.2)	35.4 (1.9)	23.5 (−4.7)	43.4 (6.4)
Mean daily minimum °F (°C)	6.7 (−14.1)	8.8 (−12.9)	18.6 (−7.4)	31.3 (−0.4)	43.9 (6.6)	53.2 (11.8)	58.5 (14.7)	56.1 (13.4)	48.1 (8.9)	37.6 (3.1)	27.1 (−2.7)	15.3 (−9.3)	33.8 (1.0)
Mean minimum °F (°C)	−15.5 (−26.4)	−13.0 (−25.0)	−5.9 (−21.1)	15.3 (−9.3)	28.2 (−2.1)	37.4 (3.0)	45.3 (7.4)	42.8 (6.0)	31.9 (−0.1)	23.0 (−5.0)	8.4 (−13.1)	−8.7 (−22.6)	−17.8 (−27.7)
Record low °F (°C)	−26 (−32)	−25 (−32)	−25 (−32)	8 (−13)	24 (−4)	30 (−1)	38 (3)	38 (3)	24 (−4)	18 (−8)	−5 (−21)	−27 (−33)	−27 (−33)
Average precipitation inches (mm)	1.88 (48)	1.65 (42)	2.12 (54)	2.79 (71)	3.33 (85)	4.14 (105)	3.95 (100)	3.79 (96)	3.32 (84)	3.71 (94)	2.54 (65)	2.45 (62)	35.67 (906)
Average snowfall inches (cm)	21.40 (54.4)	23.10 (58.7)	19.00 (48.3)	9.80 (24.9)	0.50 (1.3)	0.00 (0.00)	0.00 (0.00)	0.00 (0.00)	0.00 (0.00)	1.80 (4.6)	8.00 (20.3)	23.50 (59.7)	107.1 (272.2)
Source 1: NOAA
Source 2: XMACIS (temp records & monthly max/mins)

== Demographics ==
Historical population
Census	Pop.	Note	%±
1840	1,171		—
1850	1,504		28.4%
1860	2,348		56.1%
1870	3,042		29.6%
1880	3,162		3.9%
1890	3,046		−3.7%
1900	3,248		6.6%
1910	3,079		−5.2%
1920	2,475		−19.6%
1930	2,243		−9.4%
1940	2,428		8.2%
1950	2,098		−13.6%
1960	1,945		−7.3%
1970	1,775		−8.7%
1980	1,751		−1.4%
1990	1,847		5.5%
2000	1,812		−1.9%
2010	1,743		−3.8%
2020	1,842		5.7%
U.S. Decennial Census

As of the census of 2020, there were 1,842 people, 893 households, and 546 families residing in the town. The population density was 17.14 inhabitants per square mile (6.62/km^{2}). There were 1,050 housing units at an average density of 9.77 per square mile (3.77/km^{2}). The racial makeup of the town was 94.25% White, 0.11% African American, 0% Native American, 0.49% Asian, 0.65% from other races, and 4.51% from two or more races. Hispanic or Latino of any race were 1.90% of the population.

There were 893 households, of which 21.3% had children under the age of 18 living with them, 50.5% were married couples living together, and 38.9% were non-families. 14.1% of all households had someone living alone who was 65 years of age or older. The average household size was 2.21 and the average family size was 2.78.

In the town, the population was spread out, with 22.7% under the age of 20, 29.3% from 20 to 44, 29.2% from 45 to 64, and 18.8% who were 65 years of age or older. The median age was 47.1 years. For every 100 females, there were 94.1 males. For every 100 females age 20 and over, there were 87.4 males.

The median income for a household in the town was $63,417, and the median income for a family was $70,724. About 14.2% of the population were below the poverty line, including 21.6% of those under age 18 and 7.6% of those age 65 or over.

== Communities and locations in Ellenburg ==
- Dannemora Crossing – A location at the eastern town line, east of Ellenburg village.
- Ellenburg – The hamlet of Ellenburg is in the northern part of the town on US-11.
- Ellenburg Center – A hamlet in the northern part of the town, southwest of Ellenburg hamlet.
- Ellenburg Depot – A hamlet east of Ellenburg on US-11, named for the former train depot.
- Ellenburg Mountain – A mountain in the southeastern corner of the town.
- Gibson Corners – A location on the northern town line in the northeastern corner of Ellenburg.
- Hammonds Corners – A location on the eastern town line, on NY-190.
- Harrigan – A hamlet in the northwestern corner of the town inside the Adirondack Park.
- Lake Roxanne – A small man-made lake east of Ellenburg village.
- Merrill – A hamlet in the southwestern corner on NY-374 of the town by Upper Chateaugay Lake.
- Point Bluff – A peninsula in Upper Chateaugay Lake.
- Upper Chateaugay Lake – Part of the lake is in the southwestern corner of the town.
