= Chateaugay, New York =

Chateaugay, New York Châteaugay (French)
- Town
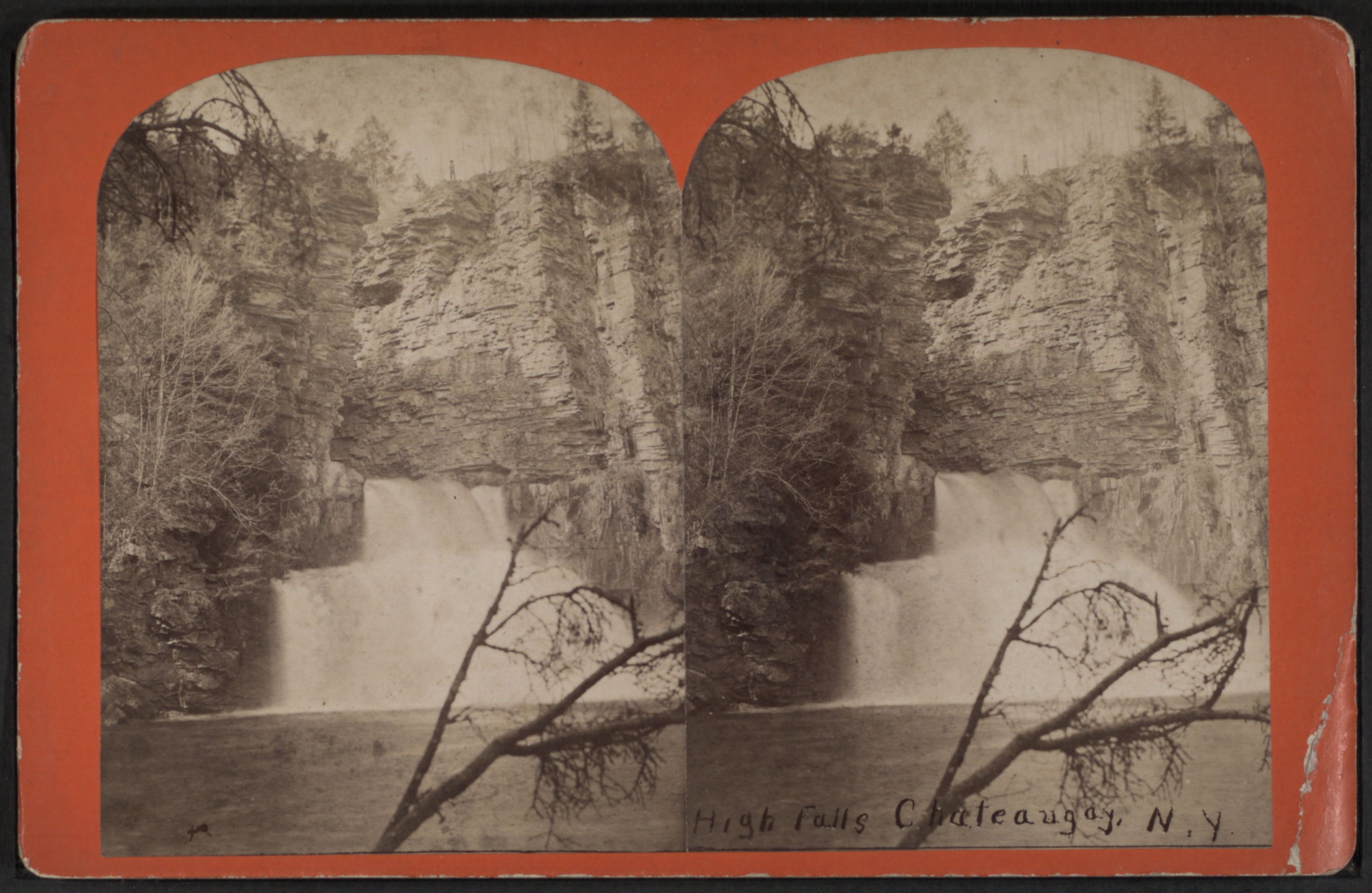
- High Falls, Chateaugay, NY

- Location within the state of New York
- Coordinates: 44°55′21″N 74°04′27″W
- Country: United States
- State: New York
- County: Franklin
- Named for: Châteaugay, France

Government
  - Type: Town Council
  - Town Supervisor: Donald W. Bilow (D)
  - Town Council: Members: • William Trombly (R); • Scot Cowan (R); • Kirby Selkirk (D); • James Harrigan (R)

Area
  - Total: 49.80 sq mi (128.98 km^{2})
  - Land: 49.79 sq mi (128.95 km^{2})
  - Water: 0.012 sq mi (0.03 km^{2})
- Elevation: 972 ft (296 m)

Population (2020)
  - Total: 1,743
- Time zone: UTC-5 (Eastern (EST))
  - Summer (DST): UTC-4 (EDT)
- ZIP Codes: 12920 (Chateaugay); 12917 (Burke)
- Area code: 518
- FIPS code: 36-033-13992
- GNIS feature ID: 978813
- Website: www.chateaugayny.org

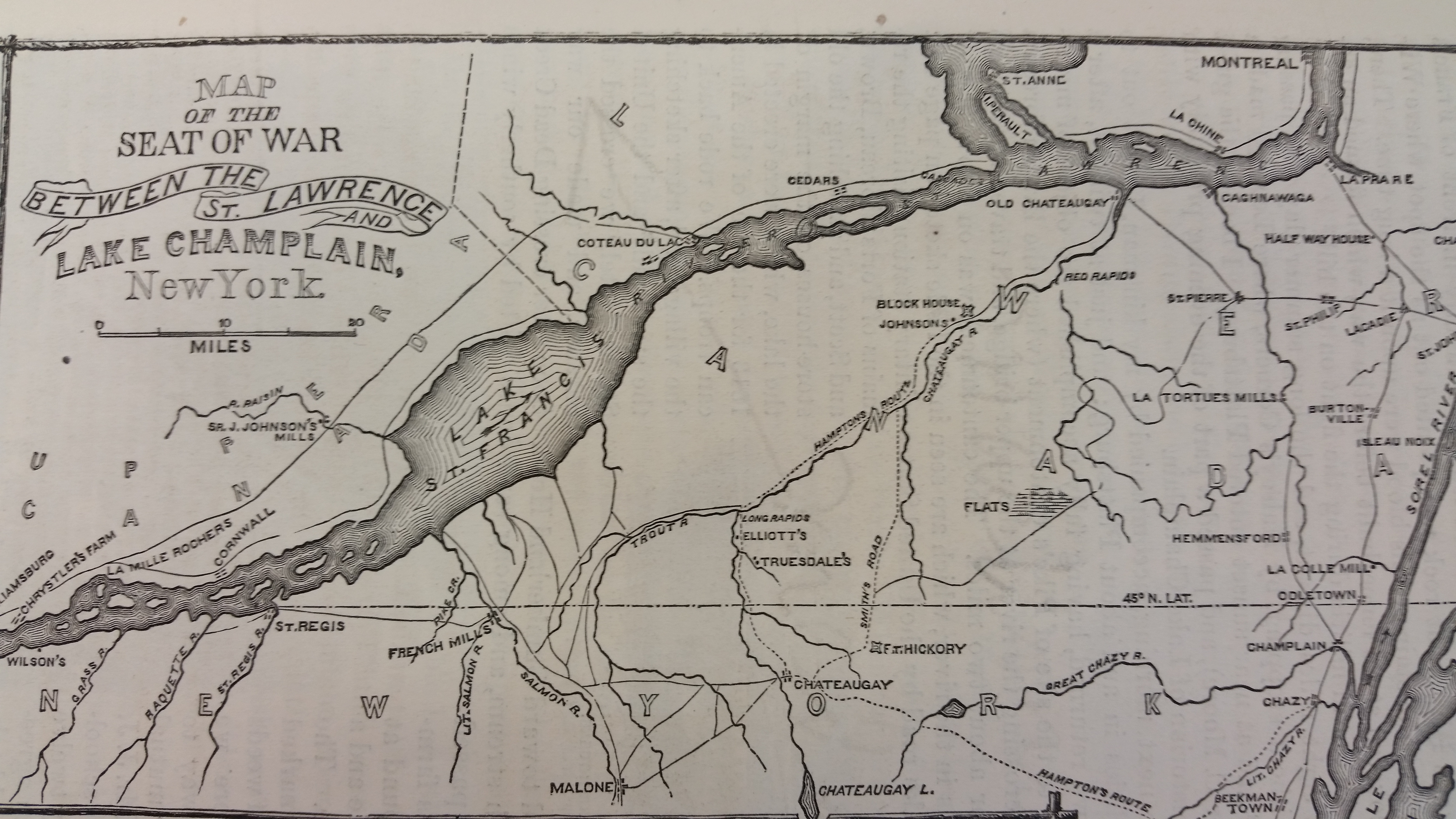
War of 1812 map showing Chateaugay in the bottom center

Chateaugay (/ˈʃætəɡeɪ/ SHAT-uh-gay; French: Châteaugay) is a town in Franklin County, New York, United States. As of the 2020 census, the town population was 1,743, down from 2,155 in 2010. The name is derived from a location in France, which was applied to a local land grant.

Within the town is a village also named Chateaugay. The town is located in the northeastern corner of the county.

== History ==
The first settlement took place in 1796.

The town was formed in 1799 before Franklin County was established, from parts of the towns of Champlain and Plattsburgh. By 1802, Chateaugay comprised most of Franklin County. Subsequently, its territory was reduced to form other towns. The town of Malone was set off from Chateaugay in 1805. When Franklin County was established from Clinton County, part of Chateaugay remained in Clinton County. The town of St. Armand was taken off in 1822 and placed in Essex County. The remaining three towns derived from Chateaugay remained in Franklin County: Bellmont (1833) and Franklin (taken from Bellmont in 1834), and Burke (1844).

Chateaugay was the hometown of Orville H. Gibson, who founded the Gibson Guitar Corporation in 1902. He died on August 21, 1918, in St. Lawrence State Hospital, a psychiatric center in Ogdensburg, New York.

In 1856, a tornado demolished more than one hundred structures in the town.

In 1868, the community of Chateaugay in the center of the town incorporated as a village.

Since 1934, the McCadam Cheese Cooperative (founded in 1876) has made cheddar cheese in Chateaugay.

The Chateaugay–Herdman Border Crossing was listed on the National Register of Historic Places in 2014 as the U.S. Inspection Station–Chateaugay, New York.

== Geography ==
According to the United States Census Bureau, the town has a total area of 49.8 square miles (129.0 km^{2}), of which 0.01 square miles (0.03 km^{2}), or 0.02%, is water.

The northern town line is the international border with Canada (Quebec), and the eastern town line is the border of Clinton County.

U.S. Route 11 is an east–west highway crossing the central part of the town. New York State Route 374 is a north–south highway intersecting US-11 at Chateaugay village.

The Chateaugay River, a tributary of the Saint Lawrence River, flows northward through the town from Lower Chateaugay Lake.

== Demographics ==
Historical population
Census	Pop.	Note	%±
1820	828		—
1830	2,016		143.5%
1840	2,824		40.1%
1850	3,728		32.0%
1860	3,183		−14.6%
1870	2,971		−6.7%
1880	2,828		−4.8%
1890	2,965		4.8%
1900	2,723		−8.2%
1910	2,840		4.3%
1920	2,856		0.6%
1930	2,687		−5.9%
1940	2,602		−3.2%
1950	2,407		−7.5%
1960	2,176		−9.6%
1970	1,948		−10.5%
1980	1,863		−4.4%
1990	1,659		−11.0%
2000	2,036		22.7%
2010	2,155		5.8%
2020	1,743		−19.1%
U.S. Decennial Census

As of the census of 2000, there were 2,036 people, 714 households, and 477 families residing in the town. The population density was 40.9 inhabitants per square mile (15.8/km^{2}). There were 865 housing units at an average density of 17.4 per square mile (6.7/km^{2}). The racial makeup of the town was 89.69% White, 6.39% Black or African American, 0.34% Native American, 0.10% Asian, 2.95% from other races, and 0.54% from two or more races. 6.19% of the population were Hispanic or Latino of any race.

There were 714 households, out of which 30.7% had children under the age of 18 living with them, 52.1% were married couples living together, 9.7% had a female householder with no husband present, and 33.1% were non-families. 27.2% of all households were made up of individuals, and 11.5% had someone living alone who was 65 years of age or older. The average household size was 2.46 and the average family size was 2.97.

In the town, the population was spread out, with 22.9% under the age of 18, 8.5% from 18 to 24, 35.8% from 25 to 44, 20.7% from 45 to 64, and 12.1% who were 65 years of age or older. The median age was 36 years. For every 100 females, there were 126.7 males. For every 100 females age 18 and over, there were 134.0 males.

The median income for a household in the town was $32,609, and the median income for a family was $37,639. Males had a median income of $29,716 versus $21,125 for females. The per capita income for the town was $15,541. 17.5% of the population and 12.3% of families were below the poverty line. Out of the total population, 23.1% of those under the age of 18 and 14.5% of those 65 and older were living below the poverty line.

== Communities and locations in Chateaugay ==
- Brayton Hollow – A hamlet northwest of Chateaugay village by the western town line on County Road 35.
- Chateaugay – The Village of Chateaugay is centrally located within the town on US-11 at NY-374.
- Chateaugay Chasm – A location at the western town boundary.
- Chateaugay River – A tributary of the Saint Lawrence River.
- Chateaugay State Fish Hatchery – A fish hatchery near the eastern town line.
- Earlville – A hamlet near the eastern town boundary on County Road 39.
- High Falls Park – A park southwest of Chateaugay village.

== See also ==
- Chateauguay River
