= Chateaugay–Herdman Border Crossing =

Canada–United States border crossing

Chateaugay-Herdman Border Crossing
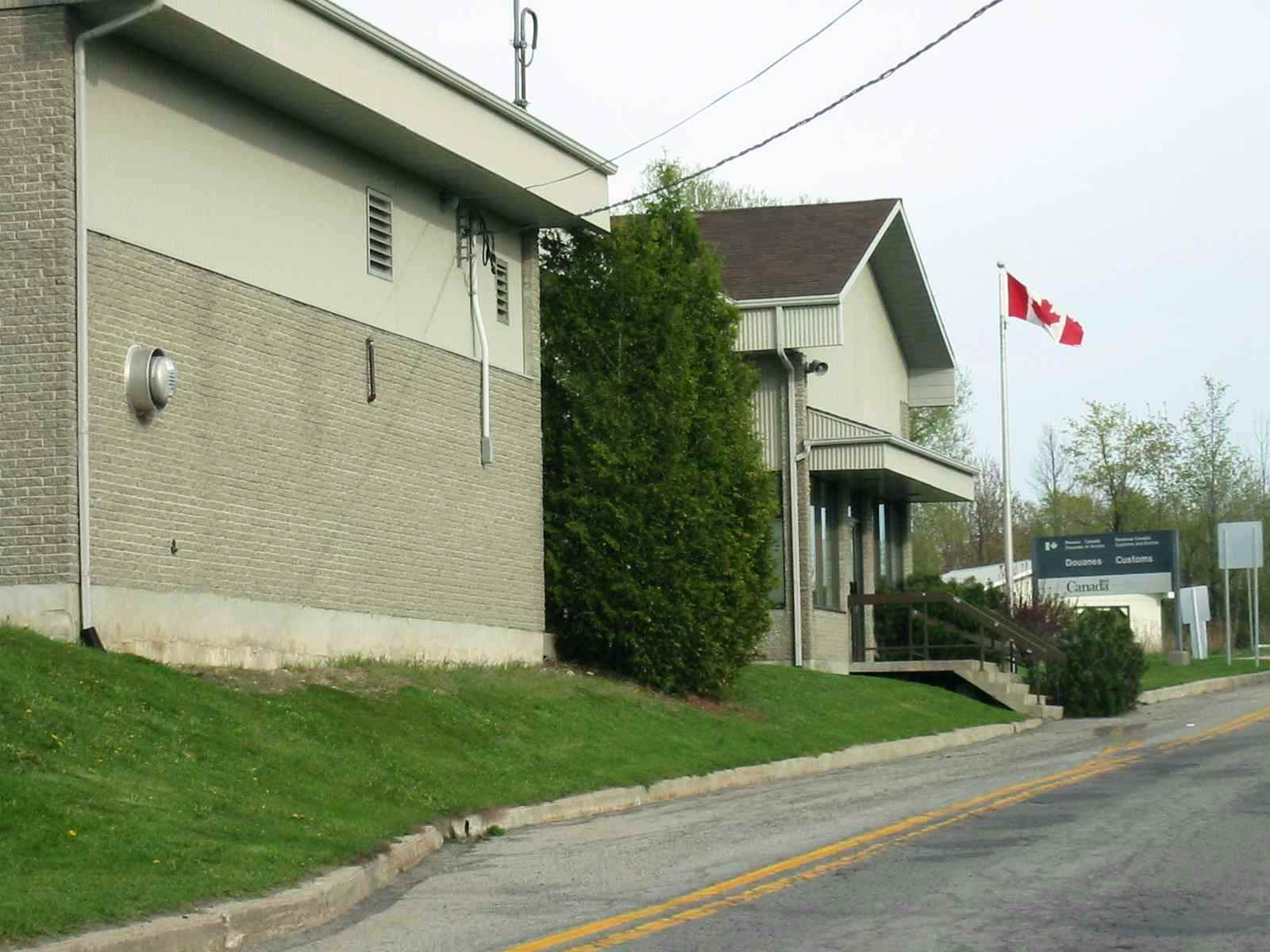
- Herdman, Quebec Border Inspection Station

Location
- Country: United States; Canada
- Location: NY 374 / Chemin Herdman; US Port: State Route 374, Chateaugay, New York 12920; Canadian Port: 2705 Douanes Road, Hinchinbrooke, Quebec
- Coordinates: 44°59′37″N 74°05′09″W

Details
- Opened: 1933

Website
- https://www.cbp.gov/contact/ports/trout-river-new-york-0715
- U.S Inspection Station–Chateaugay, New York
- U.S. National Register of Historic Places
- Location within New York Location within the United States
- Location: NY 374, Chateaugay, New York
- Coordinates: 44°59′35″N 74°5′9″W
- Built: 1932-1933
- Architect: Simon, Louis A.; Wetmore, James A.
- Architectural style: Colonial Revival
- MPS: U.S. Border Inspection Stations MPS
- NRHP reference No.: 14000861
- Added to NRHP: September 10, 2014

The Chateaugay–Herdman Border Crossing connects the towns of Hinchinbrooke, Quebec to Chateaugay, New York on the Canada–US border. The crossing can be reached by New York State Route 374 on the American side, while Chemin Herdman connects it to Quebec Route 202 on the Canadian side. This crossing is open 24 Hours per day, 365 days per year. Border inspections at the crossing were established in 1933 in response to a surge in alcohol smuggling from Canada into the United States. The U.S. border station and inspector's residence built at that time are still in use, and were listed on the National Register of Historic Places in 2014.

== US Border Facilities at Chateaugay, New York ==
=== Architectural Description ===
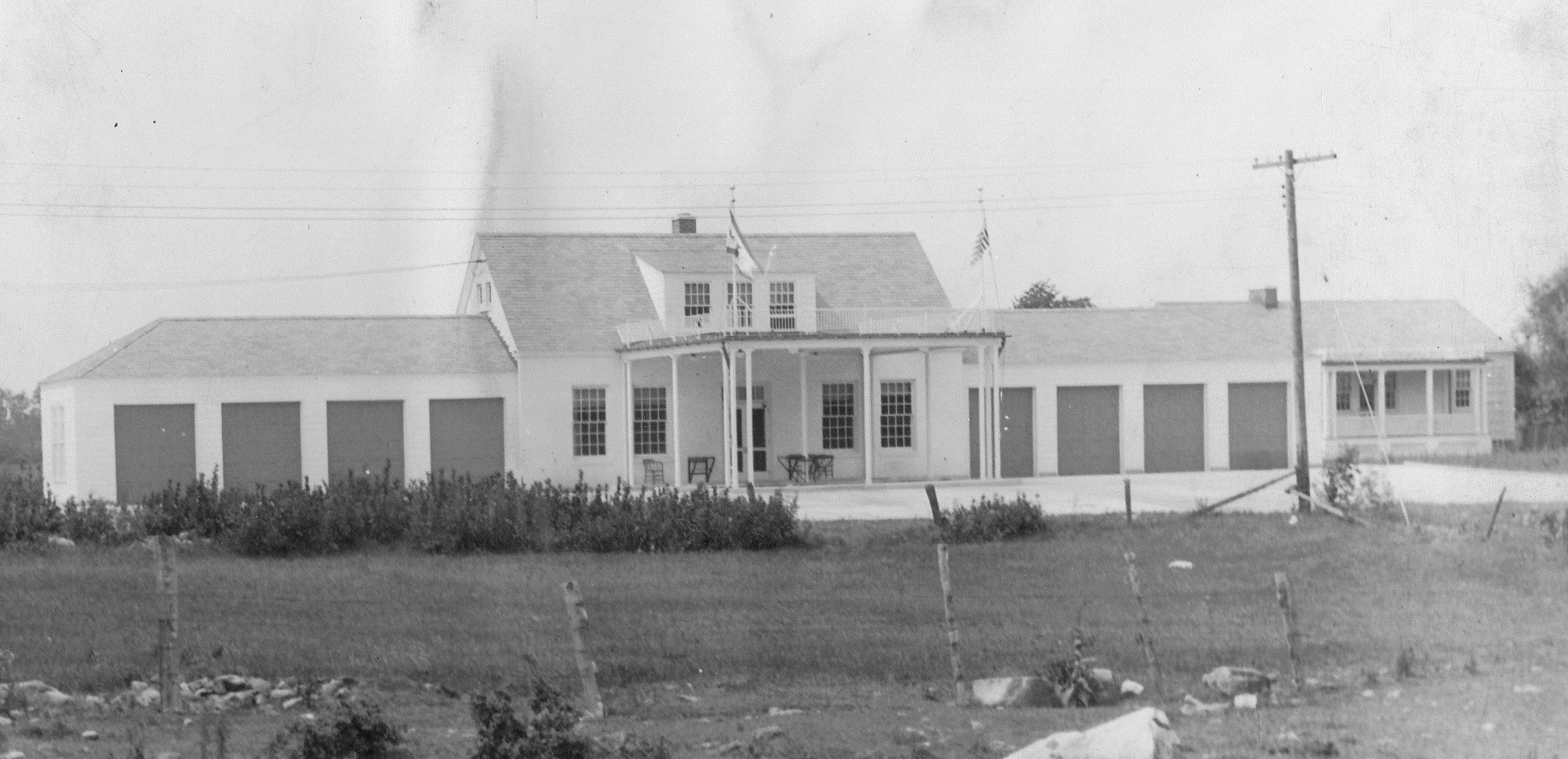
US border station at Chateaugay, NY as seen in 1933

The Chateaugay Border Inspection station at Chateaugay, New York faces east on a 49,500 square foot site on New York State Highway 374 in a rural area of open fields and scattered farm houses. The Chateaugay station was itself built on the site of a farm whose barn remains to the north. The Canadian inspection station is within sight a few hundred yards to the north. Cars are directed to the station from the north via an oval drive from the road. While the site is surrounded by open fields, it has been landscaped in a formal arrangement typically found at border stations with a row of four, now mature, spruce trees spaced across the side and rear yard and six maples screening the south lot line. There is a provision for parking on the south as well.

The Inspection Station is part of a three building complex with two residences, for customs and immigrations inspectors, which are located about 50 feet north and south west of the station.

The station is three-part in plan with a 1 1/2-story, white-painted brick central block and two single-story weatherboarded wings on the north and south. The central block is five bays wide beneath a steeply pitched, end gable, slate roof. There are shed roof dormers on both the east and west sides of the roof, and one interior brick chimney. Windows are 12/12 original double-hung sash on the first floor and 8/8 in the dormers. There is a glass-and-aluminum replacement entry on the east with a single leaf door and sidelight beneath a transom.

The wings are four bays long and one bay wide under hipped slate-covered roofs. The south wing is an inspection shed for vehicles, and that on the north is a garage for government vehicles. Two bays on the south have been filled in: one with a pedestrian door, the second with handicap-accessible bathrooms entered beneath a door hood. Two bays have wooden overhead garage doors. There is a new aluminum overhead door at the end of this wing. On the north wing, three of the four bays have new garage doors and one has been filled in for a pedestrian door. The west facades of both wings have four bays of 12/12 sash.

A two-lane inspection canopy on steel columns extends from the main block of the building at eaves level. A portion of the canopy over the outer lane has been enlarged and raised, but the canopy section closer to the building is topped by segments of its original wrought iron railing. Forming a boundary at the easternmost lane is a raised concrete island, at the ends of which two flagpoles fly the U.S. and Customs Service flags. Originally, a low stone entry wall with an engraved cornerstone was part of the entry on the north, but it has been removed.

On the first-floor interior, the space is unpartitioned with the exception of two small bathrooms directly across from the entry. A public vestibule space is formed by two parallel panelled counters at each side of the entry. Directly ahead of the entry is a stair which connects the basement to the second floor. Interior finishes are typical for the border stations with plaster walls, red floor tiles set in concrete borders, architrave door surrounds, picture rail and baseboards defining the spaces. Original lighting fixtures have been replaced with ceiling-hung fluorescent fixtures. The first floor toilet rooms have original finishes with plaster walls, white tile floors and fixtures.

The cement floored basement is divided into two mechanical rooms and a workshop. The second floor has hardwood floors and two side by side detention rooms with their original barred window grates, sinks, and barred and panelled entry doors. There is one office room and a long eaves room on the rear which is used for storage.

=== Chateaugay Border Inspector's residence ===
The clapboard covered inspector's residence located on the southwest corner of the property is a single story structure set on high reinforced concrete foundations with a bulkhead entry to the basement on the west. It has an end gable, slate covered roof with a center chimney, and is Neo-colonial in style. Five bays wide and three bays deep for a rectangular plan, the building is vacant and the windows are now sealed, but early photographs indicate that they were 6/6 sash. There is a half round window in the attic space in each gable end. The east porches have been altered with the substitution for the original windows of three bays of double jalousie sash and the removal of a simple railing which bordered the flat roof of the porch. The residence is almost hidden behind overgrown evergreen bushes.

The building has been sealed so the interior was not seen.

=== Construction History & Space Inventory ===
==== US Border Station Building Details ====
	Square Footage	Building Dimensions	
Floor Area Total:	6371	Stories/Levels:	2
First Floor Area:	0	Perimeter:	0 (Linear Ft.)
Occupiable Area:	2534	Depth:	0 (Linear Ft.)
		Height:	26 (Linear Ft.)
		Length:	0 (Linear Ft.)

==== Construction History ====
Start Year	End Year	Description	Architect
1932	1933	Original Construction	
1939	0	Rear Storm Porch Enclosure	Federal Works Agency
1957	0	New Basement Entry	GSA
1958	0	Front Porch Enclosure	GSA
1968	0	Space Modernization	GSA
1973	0	Canopy Renovation	GSA

==== US Inspector's Residence Building Details ====
	Square Footage	Building Dimensions	
Floor Area Total:	1389	Stories/Levels:	1
First Floor Area:	450	Perimeter:	0 (Linear Ft.)
Occupiable Area:	1272	Depth:	0 (Linear Ft.)
		Height:	20 (Linear Ft.)
		Length:	0 (Linear Ft.)

==== Construction History ====
Start Year	End Year	Description
1933	0	Original Construction

=== Architectural Significance ===
The Chateaugay Border Inspection Station in Chateaugay, New York is one of seven existing border inspection stations built between 1931 and 1934 along the New York and Canada border. Colonial Revival in style, the building was designed by the Office of the Acting Supervising Architect, of the Architectural Division of the United States Treasury Department, under its Superintendent Louis A. Simon, and constructed in 1932. Border stations were constructed by the federal government in several New England states along the border with Canada during the 1930s and several common plans and elevations can be discerned among the remaining stations. Chateaugay shares with the others a residential scale, a Neo-colonial style, and an organization to accommodate functions of both customs and immigration services.

Border Stations are associated with four important events in United States history: the imposition of Prohibition between 1919 and 1933; enactment of the Elliott-Fernald public buildings act in 1926 which was followed closely by the Depression; and the growth of the automobile whose price was increasingly affordable thanks to Henry Ford's creation of the industrial assembly line. The stations were constructed as part of the government's program to improve its public buildings and to control casual smuggling of alcohol which most often took place in cars crossing the border. Their construction was seen as a means of giving work to the many locally unemployed.

The Chateaugay border inspection station is a well-preserved example of the more modest, rural version of the border stations. While the stations have all sustained systematic alterations, they have retained, in varying degrees, most of their original fabric. This station is on both exterior and interior a good example of the building type, its character defining features well-maintained and intact. It is significant as one of two stations to have two inspectors' residences remaining on the site.

The inspector's residence is one of two inspector's residences at the Chateaugay Border Inspection station. Three of the seven border inspection stations in New York were constructed as complexes with residences but only two of the complexes are intact, and of the two, these appear to be in poorer condition. The mirror image residences were designed to be stylistically complementary to the station, but to be more modest than the station buildings themselves. An effort was made by the Supervising Architect's Office to design the buildings of the inspection stations to be compatible with the region in which they were built. Here a New England cape style house was the inspiration.

Even though a standard design was developed for these residences, comparison of construction photographs and original drawings, which are kept in the inspection station, point out that several changes were made to the design during construction. Originally the houses were to have an open porch and center entry on the five-bay east facade, but during construction the porch was enclosed and the main entry to the building reoriented to the northwest corner. The latter entry was constructed as a recessed vestibule with windows lighting it and was reached by wooden stairs and landing. It was later enclosed and the windows filled in to give greater space to the interior.

=== History ===
The era of Prohibition begun in 1919 with the Volstead Act and extended nationwide by the ratification of the Eighteenth Amendment to the United States Constitution in 1920, resulted in massive bootlegging along the Canada–US border. In New York, early efforts to control bootlegging were carried out by a small number of Customs officers and border patrol officers who were often on foot and horseback. In many cases New York Custom Houses were a mile or so south of the border and travelers were expected to stop in and report their purchases. The opportunity to remedy this situation and support enforcement of the Prohibition laws was offered by enactment of the Elliott-Fernald public buildings act of 1926 which authorized the government through the Treasury Department to accelerate its building program and began its allocation with $150,000,000 which it later increased considerably.

Chateaugay was west of the so-called Rum Trail which made Rouses Point the chief point of entry for bootlegged liquor in upstate New York, but it was a necessary border station for control. At the time Prohibition was repealed, the Chateaugay border inspection station had just been completed. However, the end of Prohibition did not mean the end of smuggling, as the public had developed a taste for Canadian liquor and its bootleggers had discovered the money that could be made smuggling raw alcohol into Canada where prices for it were considerably higher. Chateaugay continued to operate to interdict this activity.

While the seven New York border inspection stations had been designated for construction as early as 1929, land acquisition and the designing and bidding process was stalled at various stages for each of the buildings and their construction took place unevenly over a period of five years. Chateaugay was constructed mid-way among the stations. It is still in active use, although the residences are unoccupied.

=== Statement of Eligibility for the National Register of Historic Places ===
The Chateaugay Border Inspection Station is one of seven border stations in New York which are eligible for the National Register according to Criteria A, B and C. The stations have national, state and local significance.

The station is associated with three events which converged to make a significant contribution to the broad patterns of our history: Prohibition, the Public Buildings Act of 1926 and the mass-production of automobiles. Although this border station was not completed until a year before the repeal of Prohibition, it was planned and built as a response to the widespread bootlegging which took place along the border with Canada and continued to serve as important role after 1933 when smuggling continued in both directions across the border. The station has been in active use for sixty two years. Conceived in a period of relative prosperity, the Public Buildings Act came to have greater importance to the country during the Depression and funding was accelerated to bring stimulus to state and local economies by putting to work many of the unemployed in building and then manning the stations. Local accounts make clear the number of jobs the station created. Local labor was used to build the station and Chateaugay residents were appointed customs inspectors. Local laborers worked for the contractor Leon Wexler and the Construction Engineer Carl O. Allison.

The Chateaugay Border Inspection Station is associated with the life of Louis A. Simon, FAIA, who as Superintendent of the Architect's Office and then as Supervising Architect of the Procurement Division of the United States Treasury Department was responsible for the design of hundreds of government buildings between 1905 and 1939. During his long tenure with the government, Simon, trained in architecture at MIT, was instrumental in the image of the government projected by its public buildings, an image derived from classical western architecture, filtered perhaps through the English Georgian style or given a regional gloss, but one which continues to operate in the collective public vision of government. Simon was unwavering in his defense of what he considered a "conservative-progressive" approach to design in which he saw "art, beauty, symmetry, harmony and rhythm". The debate which his approach stirred in the architectural profession may still be observed in the fact that he is often omitted in architectural reference works.

There is no evidence that the site has yielded or may be likely to yield information important in prehistory or history.

== Canada Border Facilities at Herdman, Quebec ==
The large concrete border station at Herdman was built in 1984. In the 1930s and 1940s, Canada used to inspect vehicles entering from the US at a border station located at the corner of Main St. and 1st Concession. That old border station still stands and has been converted into a private home.

== See also ==
- List of Canada–United States border crossings
- National Register of Historic Places listings in Franklin County, New York
