= First Union Protestant Church of Mountain View =

Historic church in New York, United States

- U.S. National Register of Historic Places
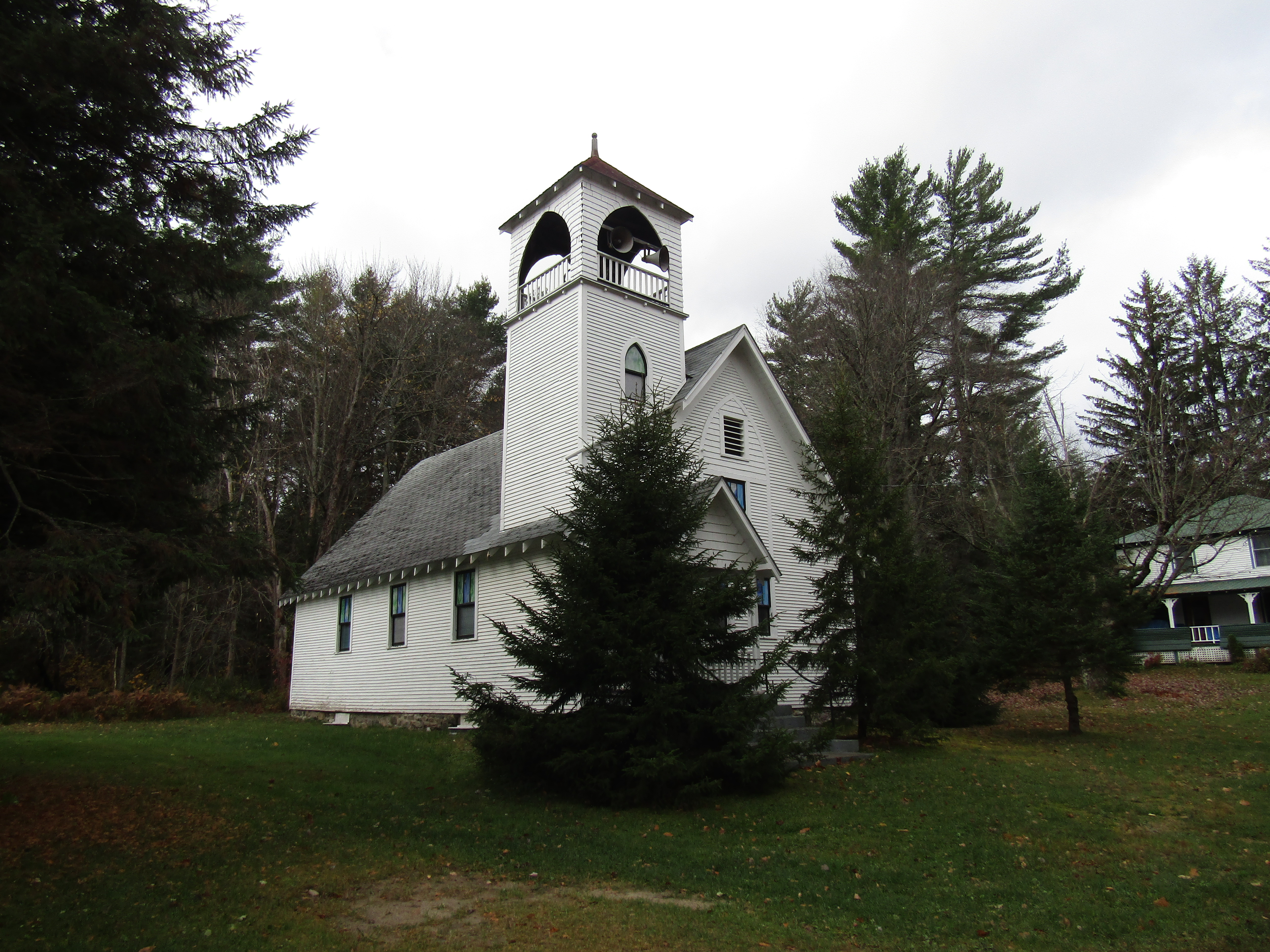

- Location within New York Location within the United States
- Location: 7 Church Rd. Bellmont, New York
- Coordinates: 44°42′6″N 74°8′22″W
- Area: less than one acre
- Built: 1915-1916
- Architectural style: Late 19th and 20th century revivals
- NRHP reference No.: 05000162
- Added to NRHP: March 15, 2005

First Union Protestant Church of Mountain View is a historic church located at 7 Church Road in Bellmont, Franklin County, New York. It was built in 1915–1916, and is a one-story, rectangular, meetinghouse-style church. It measures 26 feet, 4 inches wide and 45 feet, 6 inches deep. It has a front gable roof and sits on a stone foundation. It features a square corner steeple/tower with an open belfry.

It was added to the National Register of Historic Places in 2005.
