= New York State Route 374 =

Highway in New York

New York State Route 374
- Map of northeastern New York with NY 374 highlighted in red

Route information
- Maintained by NYSDOT and Franklin County
- Length: 42.73 mi (68.77 km)
- Existed: 1930–present

Major junctions
- West end: US 11 in Chateaugay
- NY 3 in Plattsburgh
- East end: NY 22 in Plattsburgh

Location
- Country: United States
- State: New York
- Counties: Franklin, Clinton

Highway system
- New York Highways; Interstate; US; State; Reference; Parkways
← NY 373	→ NY 375

New York State Route 374 (NY 374) is a state highway in the North Country of New York in the United States. The route follows a generally northwest to southeast progression; however, the portion of the route within Franklin County runs north–south and is signed in the same manner. The western terminus of NY 374 is at a junction with U.S. Route 11 in the village of Chateaugay. Its eastern terminus is at an intersection with NY 22 north of the city of Plattsburgh.

Most of the alignment of NY 374 is located in the Adirondack Park, heading along the shorelines of several large lakes in the northern part of the park, including the two Chateaugay Lakes and Chazy Lake. The route serves as the major road in the area of the Adirondacks for most of its length, and as a major arterial in Plattsburgh. NY 374 was assigned in the 1930 state route renumbering from NY 3 in Cadyville to the state line. It was extended eastward to NY 22 in Plattsburgh in the 1970s following the completion of an arterial bypassing northern Plattsburgh. Until 2017, NY 374's western terminus was at the Canada–United States border north of the village of Chateaugay, where the road continued north as a local road to Quebec Route 202. This route is now maintained by Franklin County and designated as County Route 52.

== Route description ==
=== Canadian border and the Chateaugay Lakes region ===
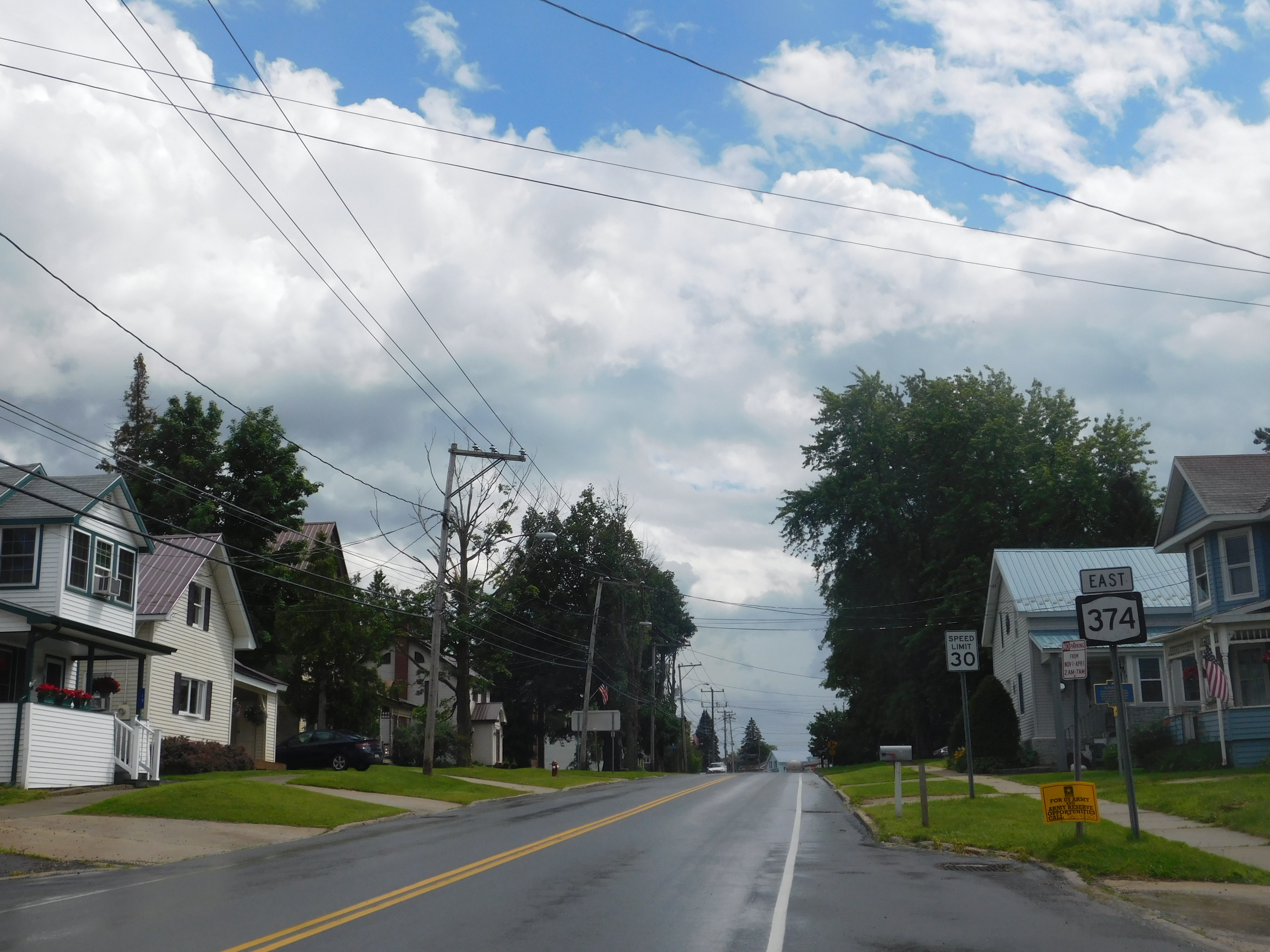
NY 374 in Chateaugay

NY 374 begins at an intersection with U.S. Route 11 (US 11, named Main Street), where it follows Depot Street and becomes maintained by the New York State Department of Transportation (NYSDOT). The route continues southward out of Chateaugay and back into the local forests and fields, where it passes to the east of High Falls Park. At the intersection with Pulpmill Road, NY 374 continues to the southeast, losing any sight of development around the highway. The route parallels Healey Road and intersects with Number Five Road, where the highway moves around in different directions. The route continues along the Chateaugay River and into Brainardsville, where it intersects with NY 190 (Military Turnpike) and CR 24 (Brainardsville Road). The route leaves Brainardsville shortly after the intersection with Reynolds Road.

NY 374, after leaving the community of Brainardsville, heads southwestward through some local residential developments before an intersection with Davis Road, where it turns to the southeastward. The route continues in this direction, intersecting with the western terminus of Forge Road (CR 54), a former alignment of NY 190 that heads eastward to the Clinton County line. NY 374 becomes very undeveloped again before following the shores of Lower Chateaugay Lake's eastern side. The route follows the short length of the shoreline. At the point where the lake turns into the Chateaugay Narrows, NY 374 enters the Adirondack Park and Clinton County.

In Clinton County, NY 374 continues along the Narrows, intersecting with Harris Road, which is a dead-end local road. The route continues southward, intersecting with Narrows Road, which crosses over the Narrows and enters a partially developed community. The route continues to the southeast running along the eastern shoreline of Upper Chateaugay Lake. A short distance later, NY 374 heads to the east, along the shoreline into Merrill, a small community in the area. The road is moderately developed, until curving to the southeast and away from the shoreline of Upper Chateaugay Lake.

=== Lyon Mountain to the Plattsburgh arterial ===
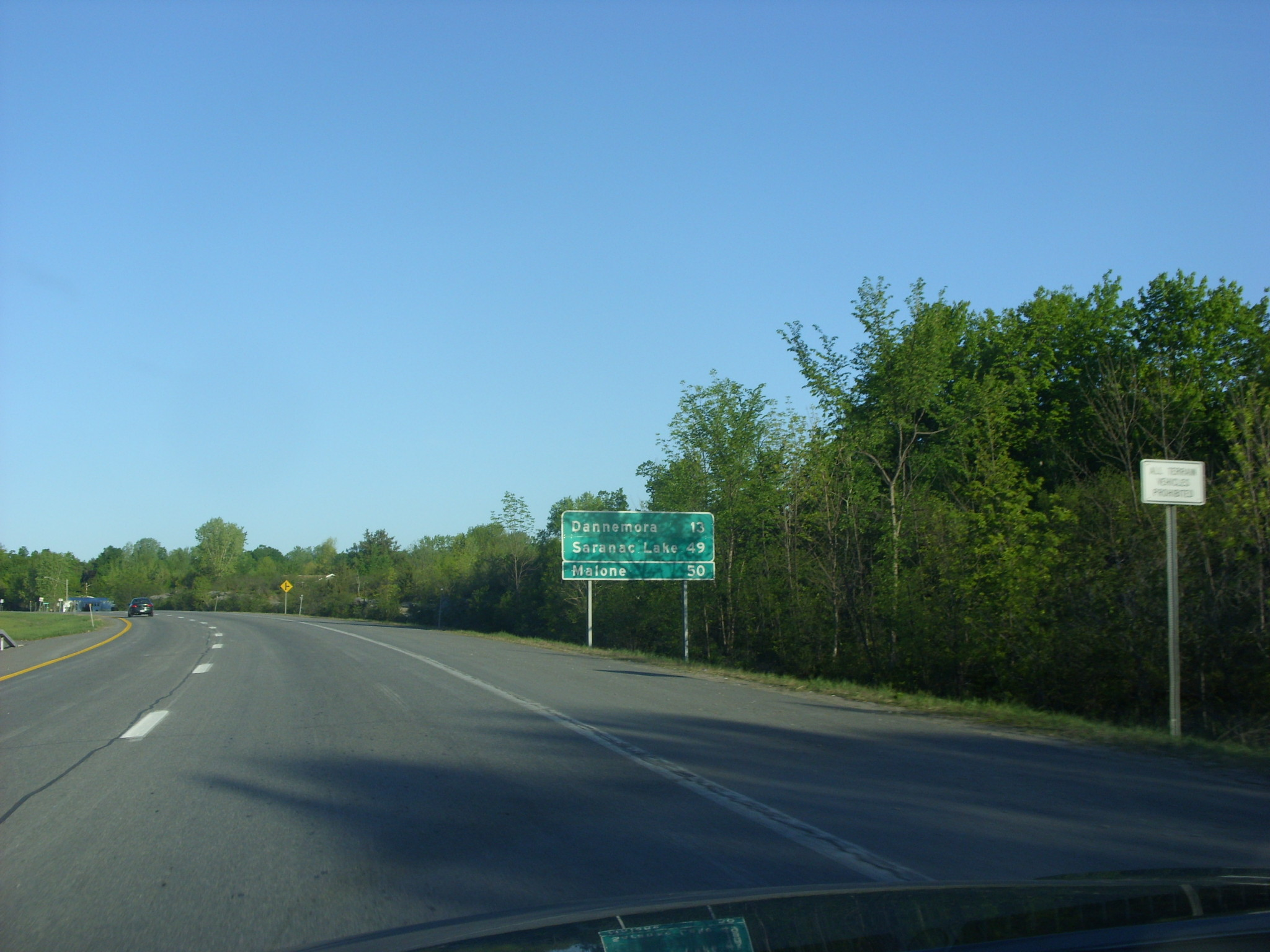
NY 374 is 13 miles (21 km) from Dannemora in Plattsburgh

After leaving the shorelines of the lakes, NY 374 intersects with Sunset Road, which is a local road heading to the southwest back to the lake. The route continues to the southeast, entering the community of Lyon Mountain, where it intersects with Bradley Pond Road (CR 2). The route continues into the moderately developed community, where it intersects with Standish Road (CR 1). The route here turns eastward, intersecting with local roads before leaving the community of Lyon Mountain and back into the undeveloped rural areas.

NY 374 continues through the undeveloped regions of the Adirondack Park and heads along a northeastern pace to an intersection with Chazy Lake Road (CR 29) on the shores of Chazy Lake. NY 374, which runs along the northern shoreline of the lake, serves as the northern terminus of Chazy Lake Road. The route continues along the northeastern shoreline and direction along Chazy Lake before turning to the southeast at a bend in the highway. NY 374 continues now on an eastward progression away from the lake becoming developed residentially once again. The route then intersects with Plank Road (CR 8) and begins a southeastern progression. The route turns to the south, heading along with the deep forests in the Adirondack Park. NY 374 continues southward for a couple of miles along with the forests, making a bend in the curve into the village of Dannemora. In Dannemora, NY 374 heads eastward, intersecting with Emmonds Street, where it becomes highly developed commercially and residentially. The route progresses eastward, passing a large commercial strip, intersecting with General LeRoy Manor Road (CR 26), where it leaves Dannemora.

After leaving the village of Dannemora, the route heads to the southeast and back into the forests of the Adirondack Park. NY 374 continues eastward, progressing to the north of downtown Cadyville. The highway turns to the northeast once again, entering Cadyville, where the route approaches an interchange with NY 3. At this interchange, NY 374 becomes a bypass, remaining a two-lane route with at-grade intersections with local roads, like Rand Hill Road, as it bypasses Cadyville and West Plattsburgh, paralleling NY 3. After West Plattsburgh, NY 3 curves to the southeast to intersect NY 22B, and NY 374 remains on an eastern track, intersecting NY 190, which intersected back in Brainardsville. Remaining a 55-mile-per-hour (89 km/h) two-lane arterial, the road parallels other main east–west roads like Tom Miller Road (CR 26), NY 3 (Cornelia Street) and Rugar Street. Just before its final junction with NY 22, the road widens to a divided four-lane highway in preparation for the nearby junction of Interstate 87 and curving into one-way streets in the city of Plattsburgh.

== History ==
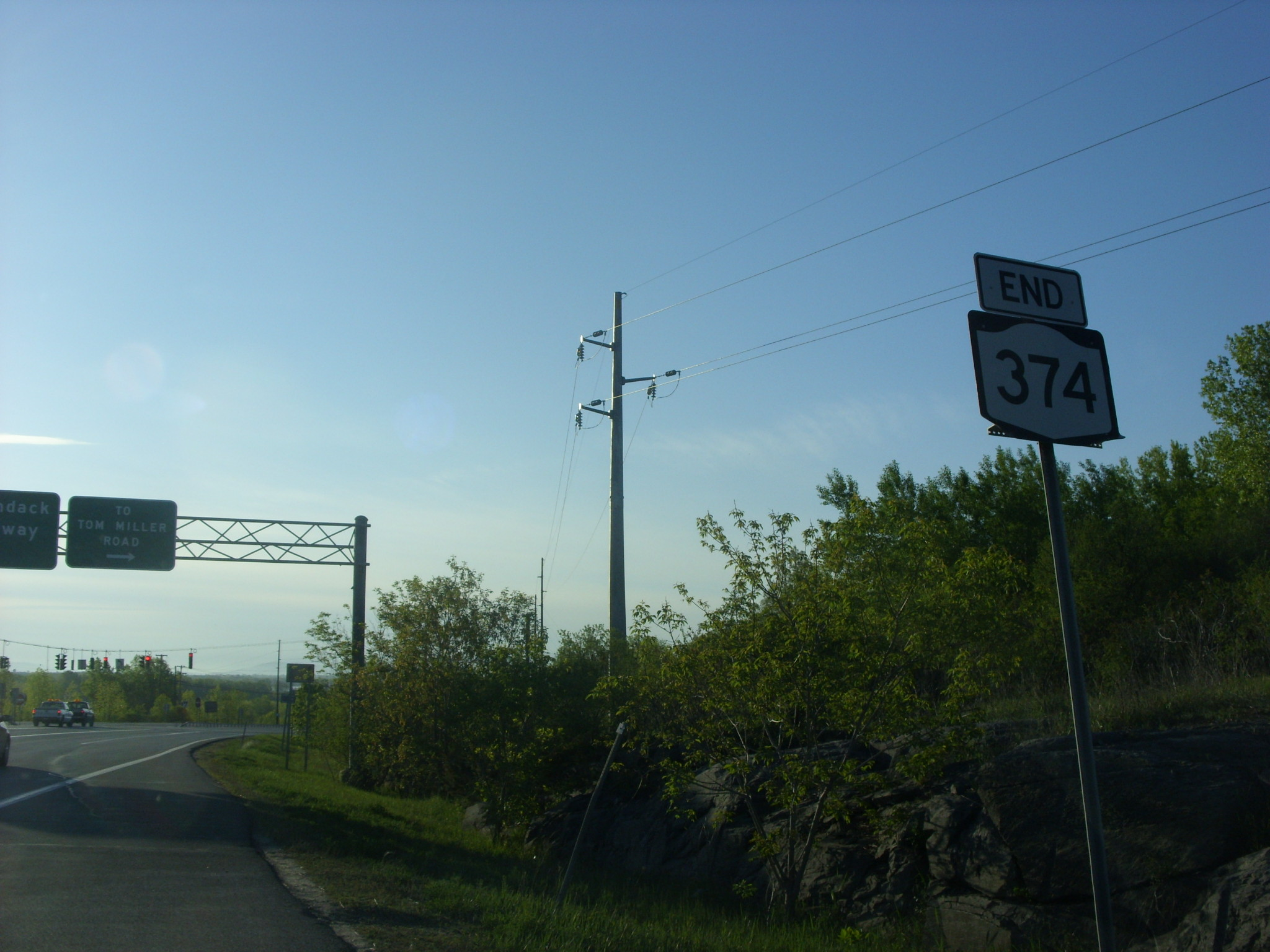
Eastbound terminus of NY 374 at NY 22 in Plattsburgh

NY 374 was assigned as part of the 1930 renumbering of state highways in New York. It initially began at the Canada–United States border north of the village of Chateaugay and ended at an intersection with NY 3 in Cadyville, a small hamlet within the town of Plattsburgh. At the time, NY 3 was the primary east–west highway into the city of Plattsburgh. In the early 1970s, a new highway was constructed north of NY 3 between NY 374 and NY 22 just outside the Plattsburgh city limits. The roadway effectively supplanted NY 3 as the main east–west road into the city; in fact, a 2.5-mile (4.0 km) section of the highway was built within 200 yards (180 m) of NY 3. The highway was completed by 1973 as an eastward extension of NY 374.

On April 1, 1980, ownership and maintenance of NY 374 from its junction with US 11 in the village of Chateaugay to the Canadian border was transferred from the state of New York to Franklin County as part of a highway maintenance swap between the two levels of government. This section of NY 374 became co-designated as CR 52. By 2017, NY 374 had been truncated to US 11.

NY 374 gained notoriety during the manhunt for prison escapees Richard Matt and David Sweat from Clinton Correctional Facility in Dannemora in June 2015. The New York State Police shut down a section of NY 374 from Dannemora to West Plattsburgh.

== Major intersections ==
County	Location	mi	km	Destinations	Notes
Franklin	Village of Chateaugay	0.00	0.00	US 11 (Main Street) / CR 52 – Malone, Rouses Point, Huntingdon	Western terminus; southern terminus of CR 52
Franklin	Bellmont	5.48	8.82	NY 190 east (Military Turnpike) CR 24 west (Brainardsville Road) – Malone	Western terminus of NY 190; eastern terminus of CR 24; hamlet of Brainardsville
Clinton	Town of Plattsburgh	35.07	56.44	To NY 3 – Saranac Lake via NY 970F	
Clinton	Town of Plattsburgh	35.32– 35.45	56.84– 57.05	NY 3 – Cadyville, Saranac Lake	Westbound exit and eastbound entrance
Clinton	Town of Plattsburgh	39.41	63.42	NY 190 (Military Turnpike) – Ellenburg, Malone	
Clinton	Town of Plattsburgh	42.73	68.77	NY 22 to I-87 – Plattsburgh, Beekmantown	Eastern terminus
1.000 mi = 1.609 km; 1.000 km = 0.621 mi: Incomplete access

== See also ==
- List of county routes in Franklin County, New York
