= Owls Head, New York =

- Hamlet
- Location within New York Location within the United States
- Coordinates: 44°44′04″N 74°10′08″W
- Country: United States
- State: New York
- County: Franklin
- Elevation: 1,532 ft (467 m)
- Time zone: UTC-5 (Eastern (EST))
  - Summer (DST): UTC-4 (EDT)
- ZIP code: 12969
- Area codes: 518 & 838
- GNIS feature ID: 959685

Owls Head is a hamlet in Franklin County, New York, United States. The community is 10 miles (16 km) southeast of Malone, and lies at the foot of the mountain that gave the hamlet its name. Owls Head has a post office with ZIP code 12969, which opened on August 24, 1892.
