= New York State Route 190 =

Highway in New York

New York State Route 190
- NY 190 highlighted in red and NY 971L in blue

Route information
- Maintained by NYSDOT
- Length: 31.84 mi (51.24 km)
- Existed: 1930–present

Major junctions
- West end: NY 374 in Bellmont
- US 11 in Ellenburg
- East end: NY 3 in Plattsburgh

Location
- Country: United States
- State: New York
- Counties: Franklin, Clinton

Highway system
- New York Highways; Interstate; US; State; Reference; Parkways
← I-190	→ NY 191

New York State Route 190 (NY 190) is a 31.84-mile-long (51.24 km) east–west state highway in the North Country of New York in the United States. The western terminus of the route is at an intersection with NY 374 in the community of Brainardsville within the town of Bellmont. Its eastern terminus is at a junction with NY 3 west of the city of Plattsburgh. The portion of NY 190 in Clinton County east of Ellenburg is known as the Military Turnpike.

== Route description ==
NY 190 begins at an intersection with NY 374 in the hamlet of Brainardsville (in the town of Bellmont) as an eastward continuation of County Route 24 (CR 24; Brainardsville Road). NY 190 progresses eastward through the hamlet, passing farms as it leaves. The route bends to the northeast soon after, intersecting with County Line Road, where NY 190 crosses into Clinton County, enters the town of Ellenburg and becomes known as Star Road. NY 190 crosses through Ellenburg as the same two-lane rural highway, passing farms as it bends northeast. During the elongated bend to the northeast, NY 190 intersects with CR 2 (Brandy Brook Road). After a distance, NY 190 begins paralleling to the north of CR 5 (Ellenburg Center Road), which merges into the right-of-way near the hamlet of Ellenburg. CR 5 doubles as a former alignment of NY 190. In the hamlet, the route passes south of a mobile home park and intersects with NY 971L, a reference route that connects NY 190 to U.S. Route 11 (US 11). At this junction, NY 190 turns eastward back through the town of Ellenburg, changing monikers to Military Turnpike and remaining a two-lane rural arterial. NY 190 passes to the south of Lake Roxane, where the route becomes surrounded by trees and sporadic homes.

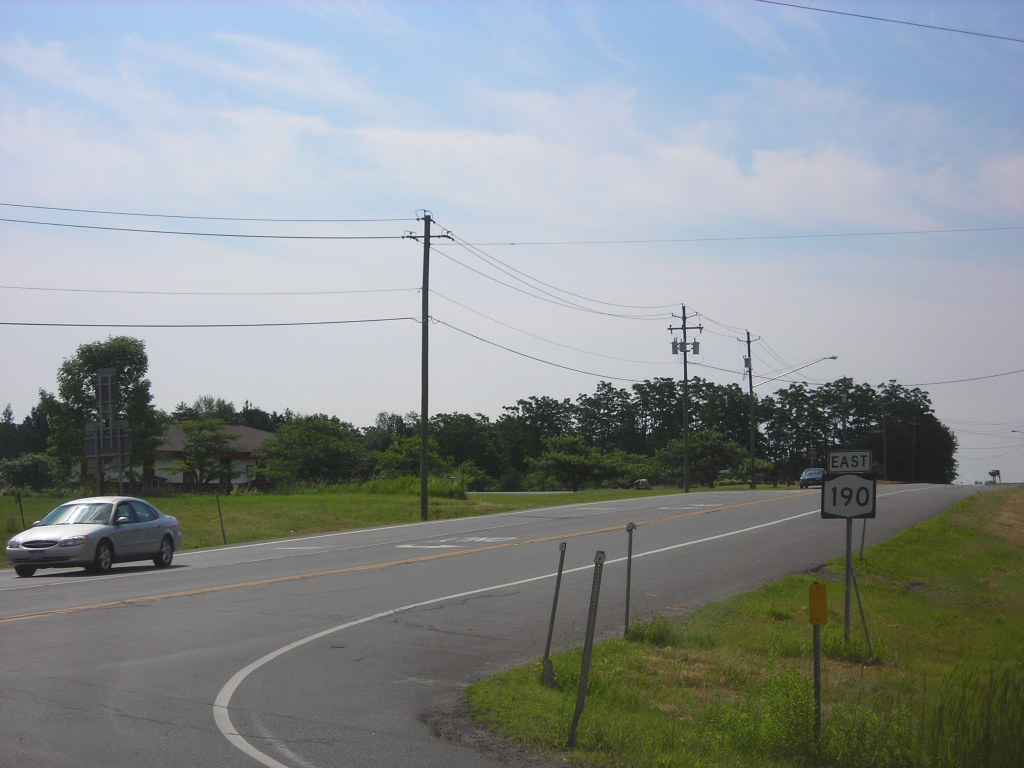
NY 190 eastbound through the town of Plattsburgh

After straightening out from a southeastern progression, NY 190 intersects with CR 8 (Plank Road) in the town of Altona. Altona remains as rural as Ellenburg, with NY 190 intersecting CR 11 (Forest Road) near the hamlet of Forest. While making a gradual turn to the southeast, CR 12 (Alder Bend Road) intersects, and NY 190 parallels power lines into the Miner Lake area. In Miner Lake, NY 190 has a short concurrency with CR 16 (Devils Den Road / Rand Hill Road). After Miner Lake, the route enters the hamlet of Robinson, where it begins another elongated turn, this time towards the south. Intersecting with the eastern terminus of CR 24 (Recore Road), NY 190 enters Beekmantown, where it finishes the southern turn. After completing the turn, NY 190 intersects with CR 27 (Duqette Road) in the hamlet of West Beekmantown. The route remains rural, soon entering the town of Plattsburgh, where NY 190 intersects NY 374 for the second time, 31 miles (50 km) from Brainardsville. NY 190 bends to the southeast once again, intersecting the terminus of CR 26 (Tom Miller Road) before passing some businesses in Plattsburgh. NY 190 then intersects with NY 3 (Blake Road), where the designation terminates. Military Turnpike continues eastward past the Clinton County Airport and through the town of Plattsburgh towards NY 22.

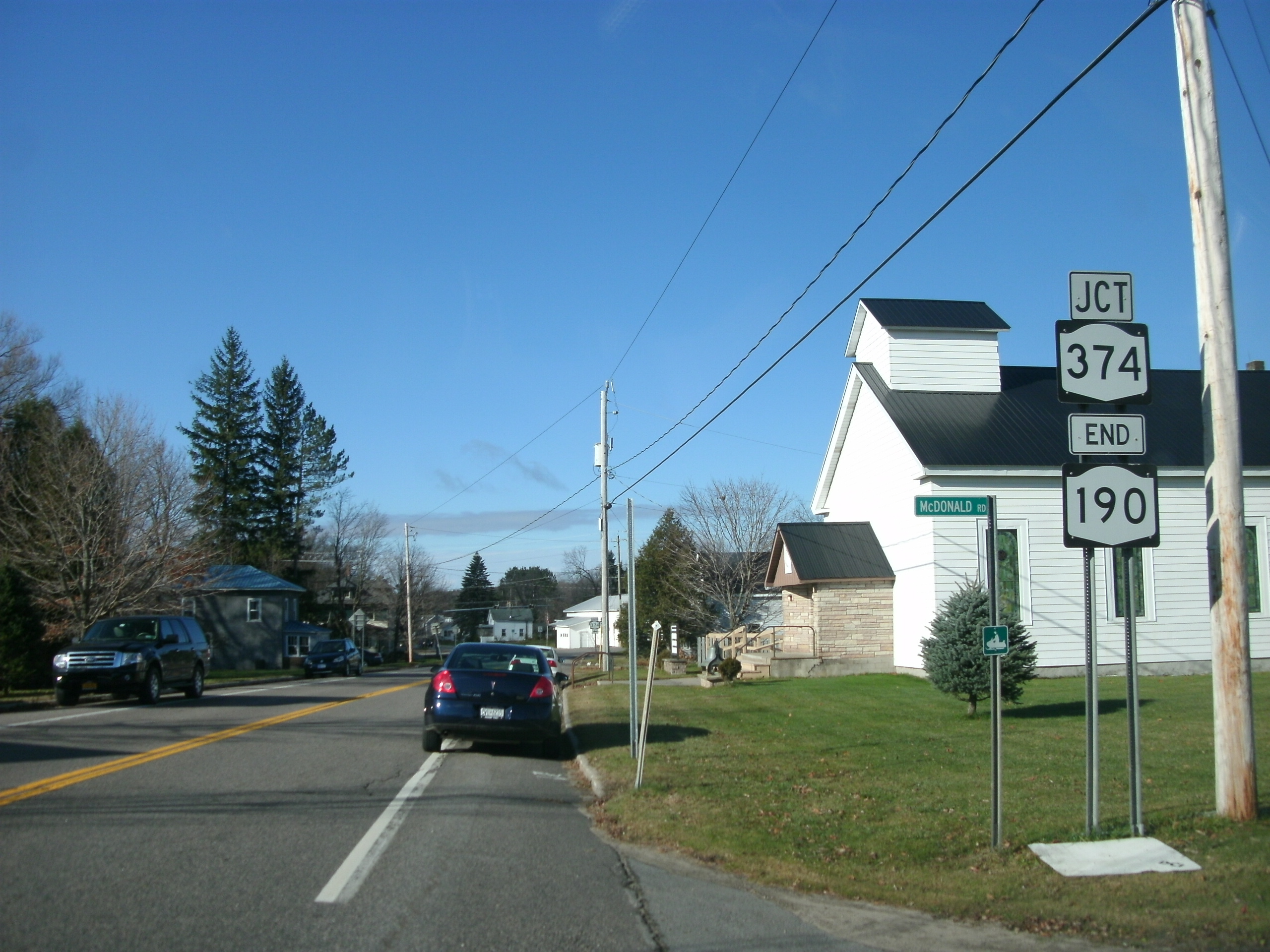
NY 190 approaching its western terminus of NY 374 in Brainardsville

== History ==
NY 190 was assigned as part of the 1930 renumbering of state highways in New York to an east–west highway extending from NY 374 in The Forge to US 11 in Ellenburg by way of Ellenburg Center. On April 1, 1980, ownership and maintenance of NY 190 from NY 374 eastward to its junction with Star Road southwest of Ellenburg was transferred from the state of New York to Franklin and Clinton counties as part of a pair of highway maintenance swaps between the state and the two counties. In return, the state assumed maintenance of Star Road, an east–west road linking NY 374 in Brainardsville to NY 190, and Military Turnpike, a highway connecting Ellenburg to NY 3 in the town of Plattsburgh. Both highways became part of a reconfigured NY 190, which now began in Brainardsville and ended west of the city of Plattsburgh. As a result of the realignment, NY 190 no longer directly connected to US 11 in Ellenburg; instead, the connection was now made by way of NY 971L, an unsigned reference route. The former routing of NY 190 west of Star Road is designated as CR 54 in Franklin County and CR 5 in Clinton County.

== Major intersections ==
County	Location	mi	km	Destinations	Notes
Franklin	Bellmont	0.00	0.00	NY 374	Western terminus
Clinton	Ellenburg	7.99	12.86	CR 5	Former routing of NY 190
Clinton	Ellenburg	8.34	13.42	NY 971L to US 11 – Malone, Rouses Point	
Clinton	Town of Plattsburgh	30.06	48.38	NY 374 – Plattsburgh, Dannemora, Saranac Lake	
Clinton	Town of Plattsburgh	31.84	51.24	NY 3 – Plattsburgh, Saranac Lake	Eastern terminus
1.000 mi = 1.609 km; 1.000 km = 0.621 mi

== See also ==
- List of county routes in Clinton County, New York
- List of county routes in Franklin County, New York
