= Beekmantown, New York =

- Town
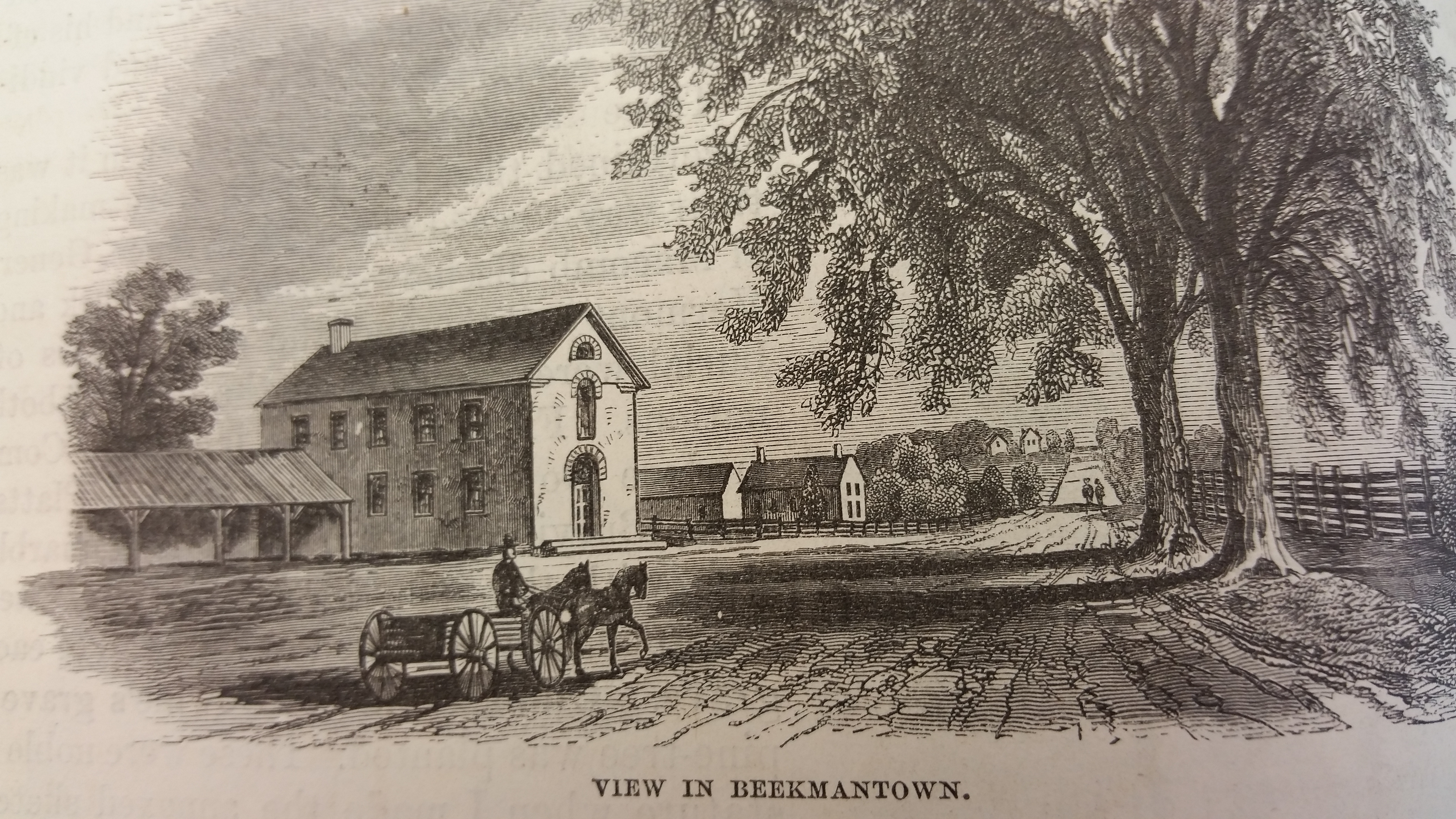
- Beekmantown

- Location in Clinton County and the state of New York.
- Coordinates: 44°46′16″N 73°29′59″W
- Country: United States
- State: New York
- County: Clinton

Government
  - Type: Town Council
  - Town Supervisor: Samuel Dyer (D)
  - Town Council: Members' List: • Sharron Garden (D); • Sydney Sue Garrant (D); • Rufus "Joe" Deyo, Jr. (D); • Michael Morales (D)

Area
  - Total: 69.63 sq mi (180.33 km^{2})
  - Land: 60.42 sq mi (156.50 km^{2})
  - Water: 9.20 sq mi (23.83 km^{2})
- Elevation: 285 ft (87 m)

Population (2010)
  - Total: 5,545
  - Estimate (2016): 5,503
  - Density: 91.1/sq mi (35.16/km^{2})
- Time zone: UTC-5 (Eastern (EST))
  - Summer (DST): UTC-4 (EDT)
- ZIP Codes: 12901 (Plattsburgh); 12992 (West Chazy); 12962 (Morrisonville); 12910 (Altona); 12918 (Cadyville)
- Area code: 518
- FIPS code: 36-019-05485
- GNIS feature ID: 0978719
- Website: townofbeekmantownny.gov

Beekmantown is a town in Clinton County, New York, United States. The population was 5,508 at the 2020 census. The town name is that of William Beekman, an original landowner. It is on the eastern border of the county, just north of Plattsburgh.

== History ==
The land was first settled circa 1783. The town was formed in 1820 from the town of Plattsburgh. Part of Beekmantown was lost in 1854 when the town of Dannemora was established.

During the War of 1812, some skirmishes took place in the town, in 1814.

== Geography ==
According to the United States Census Bureau, the town has a total area of 69.6 square miles (180.3 km^{2}), of which 60.4 square miles (156.5 km^{2}) is land and 9.2 square miles (23.8 km^{2}), or 13.22%, is water.

The eastern town line runs through the center of the west channel of Lake Champlain and is the state border with Vermont.

The Adirondack Northway (Interstate 87) and U.S. Route 9 are major north-south highways in the eastern part of Beekmantown. Access from I-87 is via Exit 40 halfway between the northern and southern town borders. New York State Route 22 and New York State Route 190 are north-south highways west of the interstate. Clinton County Route 58, known locally as Spellman Road, is an east-west highway.

== Demographics ==
Historical population
Census	Pop.	Note	%±
1820	1,343		—
1830	2,391		78.0%
1840	2,769		15.8%
1850	3,384		22.2%
1860	2,977		−12.0%
1870	2,552		−14.3%
1880	2,644		3.6%
1890	2,159		−18.3%
1900	2,067		−4.3%
1910	1,866		−9.7%
1920	1,590		−14.8%
1930	1,533		−3.6%
1940	1,704		11.2%
1950	1,690		−0.8%
1960	2,538		50.2%
1970	3,189		25.7%
1980	4,275		34.1%
1990	5,108		19.5%
2000	5,334		4.4%
2010	5,545		4.0%
2020	5,508		−0.7%
U.S. Decennial Census

As of the census of 2000, there were 5,326 people, 2,004 households, and 1,476 families residing in the town. The population density was 88.1 inhabitants per square mile (34.0/km^{2}). There were 2,210 housing units at an average density of 36.5 per square mile (14.1/km^{2}). The racial makeup of the town was 97.63% White, 0.71% African American, 0.17% Native American, 0.28% Asian, 0.02% Pacific Islander, 0.24% from other races, and 0.94% from two or more races. Hispanic or Latino of any race were 1.01% of the population.

There were 2,004 households, out of which 36.0% had children under the age of 18 living with them, 61.2% were married couples living together, 7.8% had a female householder with no husband present, and 26.3% were non-families. 18.4% of all households were made up of individuals, and 5.9% had someone living alone who was 65 years of age or older. The average household size was 2.65 and the average family size was 3.00.

In the town, the population was spread out, with 26.3% under the age of 18, 7.8% from 18 to 24, 30.9% from 25 to 44, 25.8% from 45 to 64, and 9.1% who were 65 years of age or older. The median age was 37 years. For every 100 females, there were 100.1 males. For every 100 females age 18 and over, there were 99.3 males.

The median income for a household in the town was $42,555, and the median income for a family was $45,915. Males had a median income of $34,716 versus $22,040 for females. The per capita income for the town was $18,792. About 11.0% of families and 12.9% of the population were below the poverty line, including 18.6% of those under age 18 and 5.8% of those age 65 or over.

== Communities and locations in Beekmantown ==
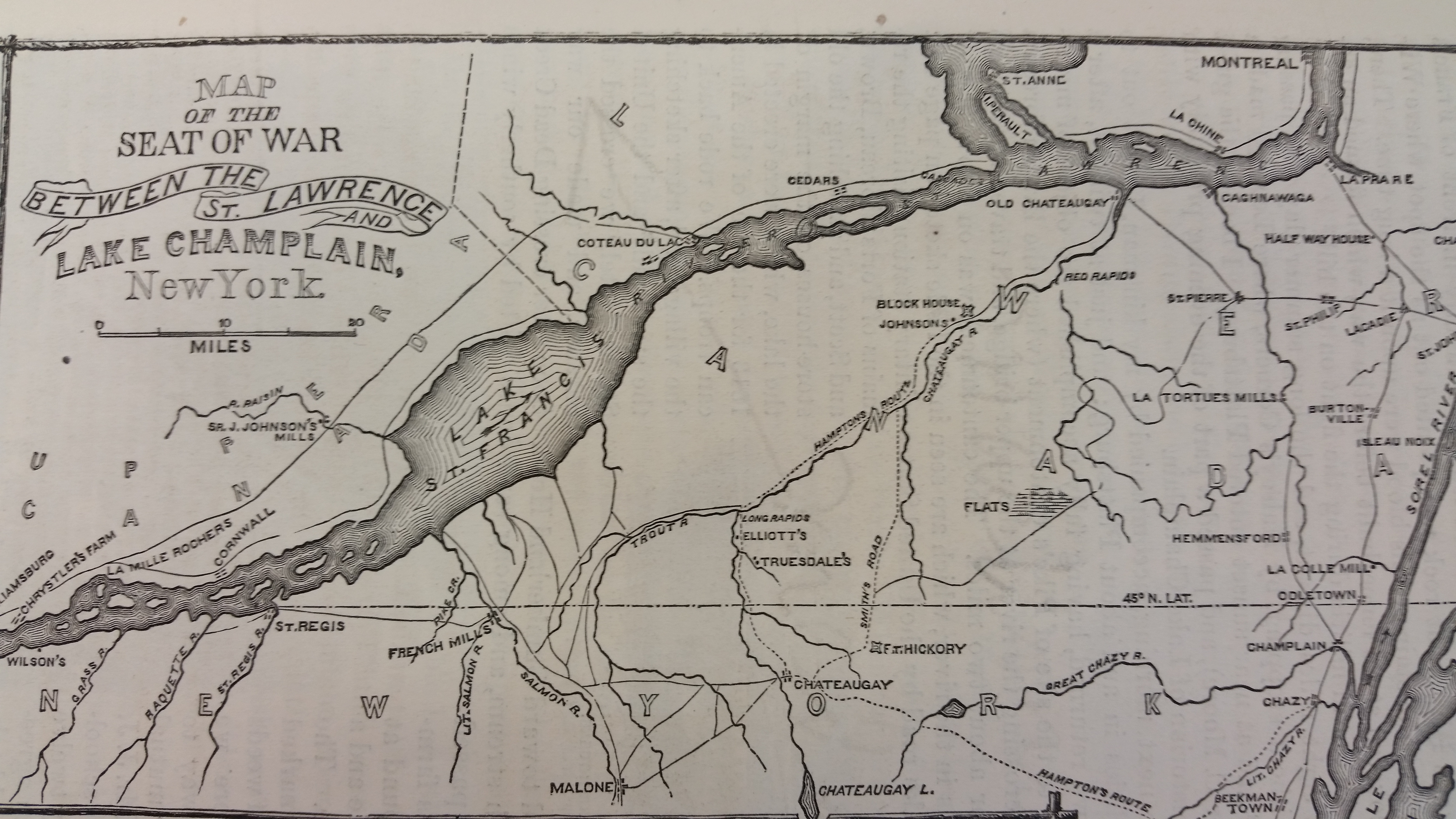
War of 1812 map showing Beekmantown in the lower right

- Beartown – A location southwest of West Beekmantown.
- Beekmantown (or "Beekmantown Corners") – The hamlet of Beekmantown is located near the geographic center of the town on NY-22.
- East Beekmantown – A hamlet southeast of Beekmantown hamlet on NY-22.
- Gilroy Corners – A location south of West Beekmantown.
- Ingraham – A hamlet on the northern town line, located on US-9.
- Lawliss Corners – A hamlet on the southern town line.
- Monty's Bay Wildlife Management Area – A conservation area by Point au Roche.
- Point au Roche – A peninsula into Lake Champlain, as well as the name of a settlement located in the northeastern part of Beekmantown.
- Point Au Roche State Park – A state park on the shore of Lake Champlain.
- St. Armand Beach – A location near Treadwell Bay.
- Treadwell Bay – A bay of Lake Champlain south of the state park.
- West Beekmantown – A hamlet in the western part of the town on NY-190.
- New York State Welcome Center/Beekmantown Rest Area – A rest area on Interstate 87 with tourist information about the state of New York and rest rooms.

== Education ==
The town is part of the Beekmantown Central School District (K-12). The town's younger schoolchildren attend Beekmantown Elementary. At grade 6, students attend Beekmantown Middle School (6-8), which also serves students from the Cumberland Head area of the town of Plattsburgh. Once the students have completed middle school, they go to Beekmantown High School. The high school and middle school share a building but have separate gyms, locker rooms, hallways and classrooms. The school is located on Spellman Road in West Chazy, New York.
