= Chateaugay (village), New York =

Chateaugay Châteaugay (French)
- Village
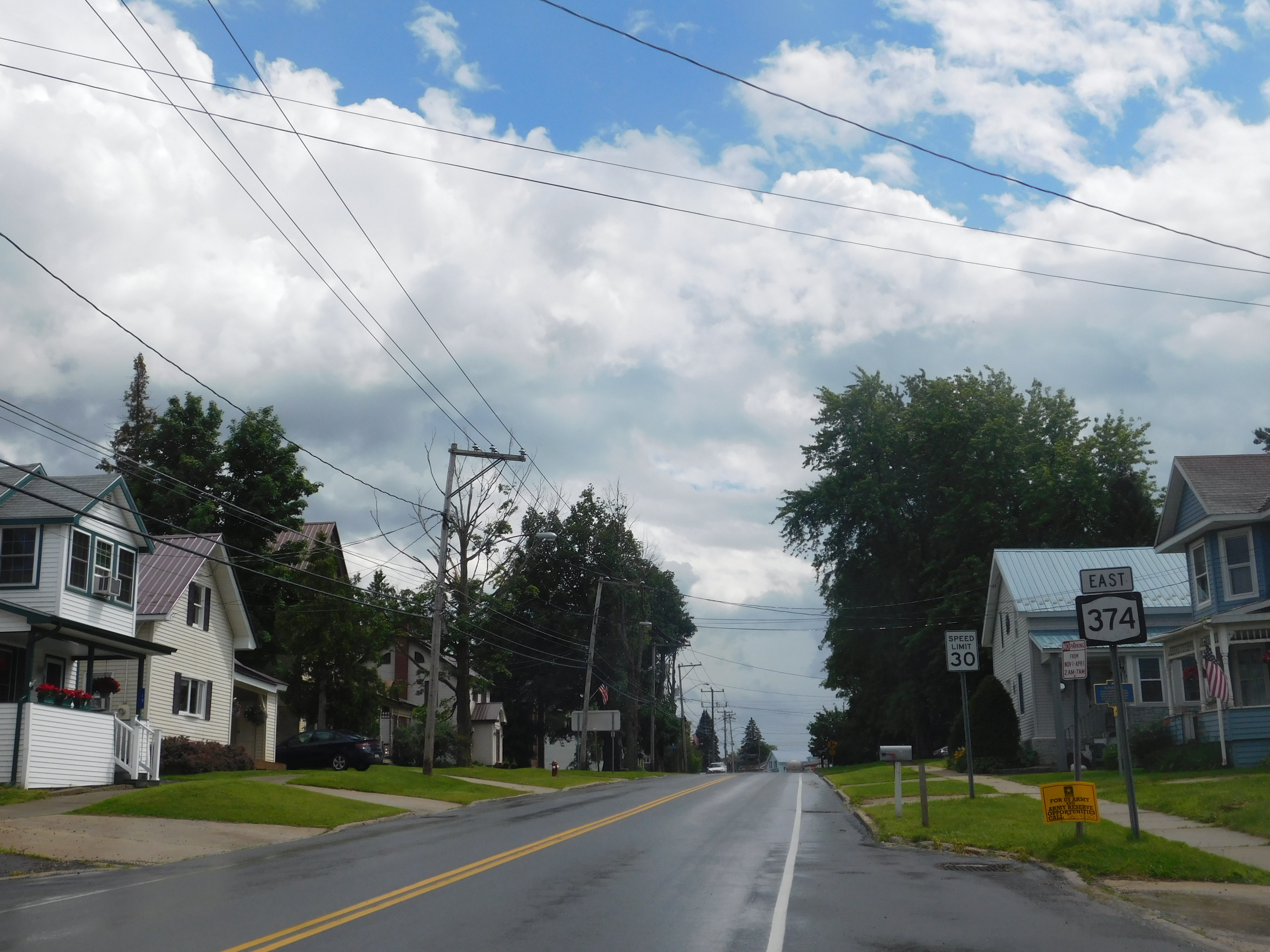
- NY 374 in Chateaugay.

- Location within the state of New York
- Coordinates: 44°55′33″N 74°4′42″W
- Country: United States
- State: New York
- County: Franklin
- Town: Chateaugay
- Named after: Châteaugay, France

Area
  - Total: 1.08 sq mi (2.81 km^{2})
  - Land: 1.08 sq mi (2.81 km^{2})
  - Water: 0 sq mi (0.00 km^{2})
- Elevation: 945 ft (288 m)

Population (2020)
  - Total: 735
  - Density: 678.4/sq mi (261.95/km^{2})
- Time zone: UTC-5 (Eastern (EST))
  - Summer (DST): UTC-4 (EDT)
- ZIP code: 12920
- Area code: 518
- FIPS code: 36-13981
- GNIS feature ID: 0946443

Chateaugay (French: Châteaugay) is a village in Franklin County, New York, United States. The population was 833 at the 2010 census. The village is located in the town of Chateaugay, northeast of Malone. The village and town are named after a village near Lyon in France, which became the name of a land grant in Canada.

== History ==
The village of Chateaugay was incorporated in 1868. It has persisted in spite of three major devastations by fire in its history.

== Geography ==
Chateaugay village is located in the center of the town of Chateaugay at 44°55′32″N 74°4′41″W (44.925706, -74.078218), near the northeastern corner of Franklin County.

According to the United States Census Bureau, the village has a total area of 1.1 square miles (2.8 km^{2}), all land.

Bailey Brook flows north through the village, turning west to join the Chateaugay River.

U.S. Route 11 intersects New York State Route 374 in the village. US-11 leads southwest 13 miles (21 km) to Malone and east 33 miles (53 km) to Interstate 87 at Champlain. NY-374 leads north 4.5 miles (7.2 km) to the Canada–US border.

== Demographics ==
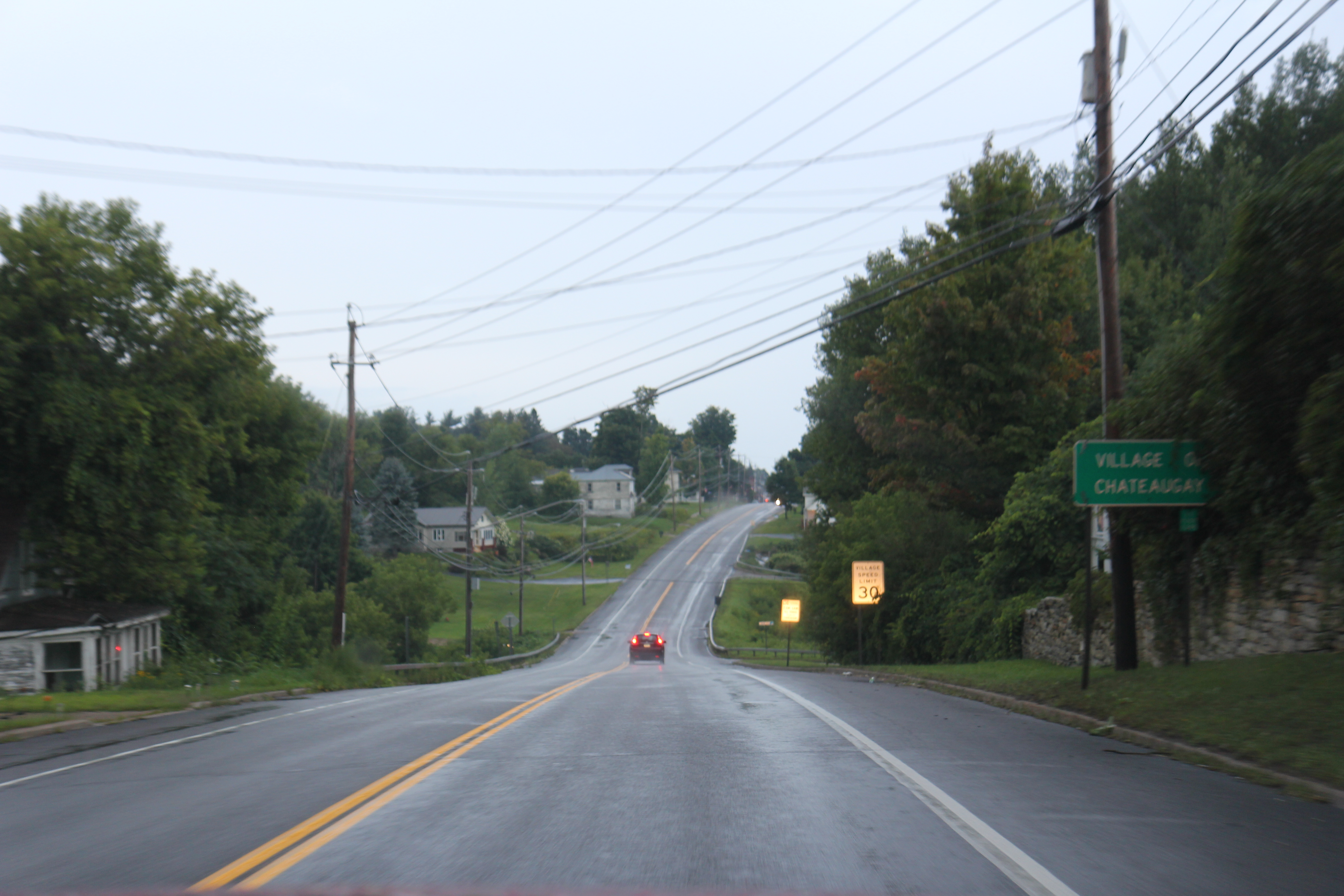
Sign for Chateaugay on US Route 11

Historical population
Census	Pop.	Note	%±
1880	680		—
1890	1,172		72.4%
1900	973		−17.0%
1910	1,045		7.4%
1920	1,291		23.5%
1930	1,169		−9.5%
1940	1,183		1.2%
1950	1,234		4.3%
1960	1,097		−11.1%
1970	976		−11.0%
1980	869		−11.0%
1990	845		−2.8%
2000	798		−5.6%
2010	833		4.4%
2020	735		−11.8%
U.S. Decennial Census

As of the census of 2000, there were 798 people, 338 households, and 209 families residing in the village. The population density was 740.2 inhabitants per square mile (285.8/km^{2}). There were 390 housing units at an average density of 361.7 per square mile (139.7/km^{2}). The racial makeup of the village was 98.25% White, 0.50% Black or African American, 0.63% Native American, 0.38% from other races, and 0.25% from two or more races. Hispanic or Latino of any race were 0.50% of the population.

There were 338 households, out of which 27.8% had children under the age of 18 living with them, 44.7% were married couples living together, 12.4% had a female householder with no husband present, and 37.9% were non-families. 32.5% of all households were made up of individuals, and 14.8% had someone living alone who was 65 years of age or older. The average household size was 2.33 and the average family size was 2.90.

In the village, the population was spread out, with 23.6% under the age of 18, 8.6% from 18 to 24, 28.2% from 25 to 44, 23.3% from 45 to 64, and 16.3% who were 65 years of age or older. The median age was 39 years. For every 100 females, there were 90.9 males. For every 100 females age 18 and over, there were 86.5 males.

The median income for a household in the village was $34,000, and the median income for a family was $35,750. Males had a median income of $33,333 versus $25,096 for females. The per capita income for the village was $16,436. About 13.5% of families and 16.3% of the population were below the poverty line, including 23.1% of those under age 18 and 16.9% of those age 65 or over.
