= Plattekill (CDP), New York =

Plattekill, New York
- CDP
- Location in Ulster County and the state of New York.
- Coordinates: 41°36′42″N 74°4′20″W
- Country: United States
- State: New York
- County: Ulster

Area
  - Total: 2.84 sq mi (7.36 km^{2})
  - Land: 2.76 sq mi (7.16 km^{2})
  - Water: 0.073 sq mi (0.19 km^{2})
- Elevation: 568 ft (173 m)

Population (2020)
  - Total: 1,296
  - Density: 468.7/sq mi (180.96/km^{2})
- Time zone: UTC-5 (EST)
  - Summer (DST): UTC-4 (EDT)
- ZIP code: 12568
- Area code: 845
- FIPS code: 36-58541
- GNIS feature ID: 0960690

Plattekill is a hamlet (and census-designated place) in Ulster County, New York, United States. The population was 1,296 at the 2020 census. The community, as is the town, is named after a local stream, the Platte Kill.

Plattekill is in the southern part of the Town of Plattekill. The community is adjacent to the New York State Thruway (Interstate 87) at the junction of Routes 32 and 13 and is one mile (1.6 km) north of the county line of Orange County.

== Geography ==
Plattekill is located at 41°36′42″N 74°4′20″W (41.611799, -74.072256).

According to the United States Census Bureau, the CDP has a total area of 2.6 square miles (6.8 km^{2}), of which 2.6 square miles (6.8 km^{2}) is land and 0.38% is water.

== Demographics ==
Historical population
Census	Pop.	Note	%±
2000	1,050		—
2010	1,260		20.0%
2020	1,296		2.9%
U.S. Decennial Census

As of the census of 2000, there were 1,050 people, 346 households, and 263 families residing in the CDP. The population density was 401.5 inhabitants per square mile (155.0/km^{2}). There were 383 housing units at an average density of 146.5 per square mile (56.6/km^{2}). The racial makeup of the CDP was 72.57% White, 8.19% Black or African American, 0.57% Native American, 0.67% Asian, 15.14% from other races, and 2.86% from two or more races. Hispanic or Latino of any race were 50.19% of the population.

There were 346 households, out of which 43.6% had children under the age of 18 living with them, 47.7% were married couples living together, 21.4% had a female householder with no husband present, and 23.7% were non-families. 19.4% of all households were made up of individuals, and 6.1% had someone living alone who was 65 years of age or older. The average household size was 3.03 and the average family size was 3.36.

In the CDP, the population was spread out, with 33.3% under the age of 18, 6.7% from 18 to 24, 29.0% from 25 to 44, 21.0% from 45 to 64, and 10.0% who were 65 years of age or older. The median age was 34 years. For every 100 females, there were 92.3 males. For every 100 females age 18 and over, there were 89.2 males.

The median income for a household in the CDP was $40,769, and the median income for a family was $41,429. Males had a median income of $38,250 versus $33,036 for females. The per capita income for the CDP was $15,497. About 8.5% of families and 11.7% of the population were below the poverty line, including 15.5% of those under age 18 and none of those age 65 or over.

== Education ==
The CDP is in Wallkill Central School District.
