= Interstate 87 (New York) =

Interstate Highway in eastern New York

Interstate 87
- Map of the northeastern United States with I-87 highlighted in red, and associated reference routes in pink

Route information
- Maintained by NYSTA and NYSDOT
- Length: 333.49 mi (536.70 km)
- Existed: August 14, 1957–present
- NHS: Entire route
- Restrictions: No explosives on the Tappan Zee Bridge

Major junctions
- South end: I-278 in Port Morris
- I-95 / US 1 in Morris Heights; I-287 / NY 119 / Saw Mill River Parkway in Elmsford; Palisades Parkway in West Nyack; I-287 / Route 17 in Suffern; Future I-86 in Harriman; I-84 / NY 300 in Newburgh; I-787 / US 9W in Albany; I-90 Toll / New York Thruway in Albany; US 11 in Champlain; US 9 in Champlain
- North end: A-15 at the Canadian border in Champlain

Location
- Country: United States
- State: New York
- Counties: Bronx, Westchester, Rockland, Orange, Ulster, Greene, Albany, Saratoga, Warren, Essex, Clinton

Highway system
- Interstate Highway System; Main; Auxiliary; Suffixed; Business; Future; New York Highways; Interstate; US; State; Reference; Parkways
← NY 86A	→ NY 87
← NY 1A	NY 1B	→ NY 1X

Interstate 87 (I-87) is a 333.49-mile-long (536.70 km) north–south Interstate Highway located entirely within the US state of New York. I-87 is the main highway that connects New York City and Montreal. The highway begins at exit 47 off I-278 in the New York City borough of the Bronx, just north of the Robert F. Kennedy Bridge. From there, the route runs northward through the Hudson Valley, the Capital District, and the easternmost part of the North Country to the Canada–United States border in the town of Champlain. At its north end, I-87 continues into Quebec as Autoroute 15 (A-15). I-87 connects with several regionally important roads: I-95 in New York City, New York State Route 17 (NY 17; future I-86) near Harriman, I-84 near Newburgh, and I-90 in Albany. The highway is not contiguous with I-87 in North Carolina.

I-87 was assigned in 1957 as part of the establishment of the Interstate Highway System. The portion of I-87 south of Albany follows two controlled-access highways that predate the Interstate Highway designation, the Major Deegan Expressway (locally known as "the Deegan") in New York City and the tolled New York State Thruway from the New York City line to Albany. North of Albany, I-87 follows the Adirondack Northway, a highway built in stages between 1957 and 1967 (finished just in time to bring Americans to the World Exhibition held in Montreal that year). Early proposals for I-87 called for the route to take a more easterly course through the Hudson Valley and extreme southwestern Connecticut between New York City and Newburgh. These plans were scrapped in 1970 when I-87 was realigned onto the Thruway between Westchester County and Newburgh.

== Route description ==
I-87 makes up most of the major strategic corridor between New York City, the largest metropolitan area in the US, and Montreal, the second-largest metropolitan area in Canada (formerly the largest). The New York State Department of Transportation (NYSDOT) considers the route important for commerce, as it connects with numerous highways in the region and serves approximately 80 million people in the Mid-Atlantic states, New England, and Quebec. Motorists can connect to multiple highways to travel farther south along I-95 through the Mid-Atlantic states or farther east into New England.

=== South of Albany ===
==== Major Deegan Expressway ====
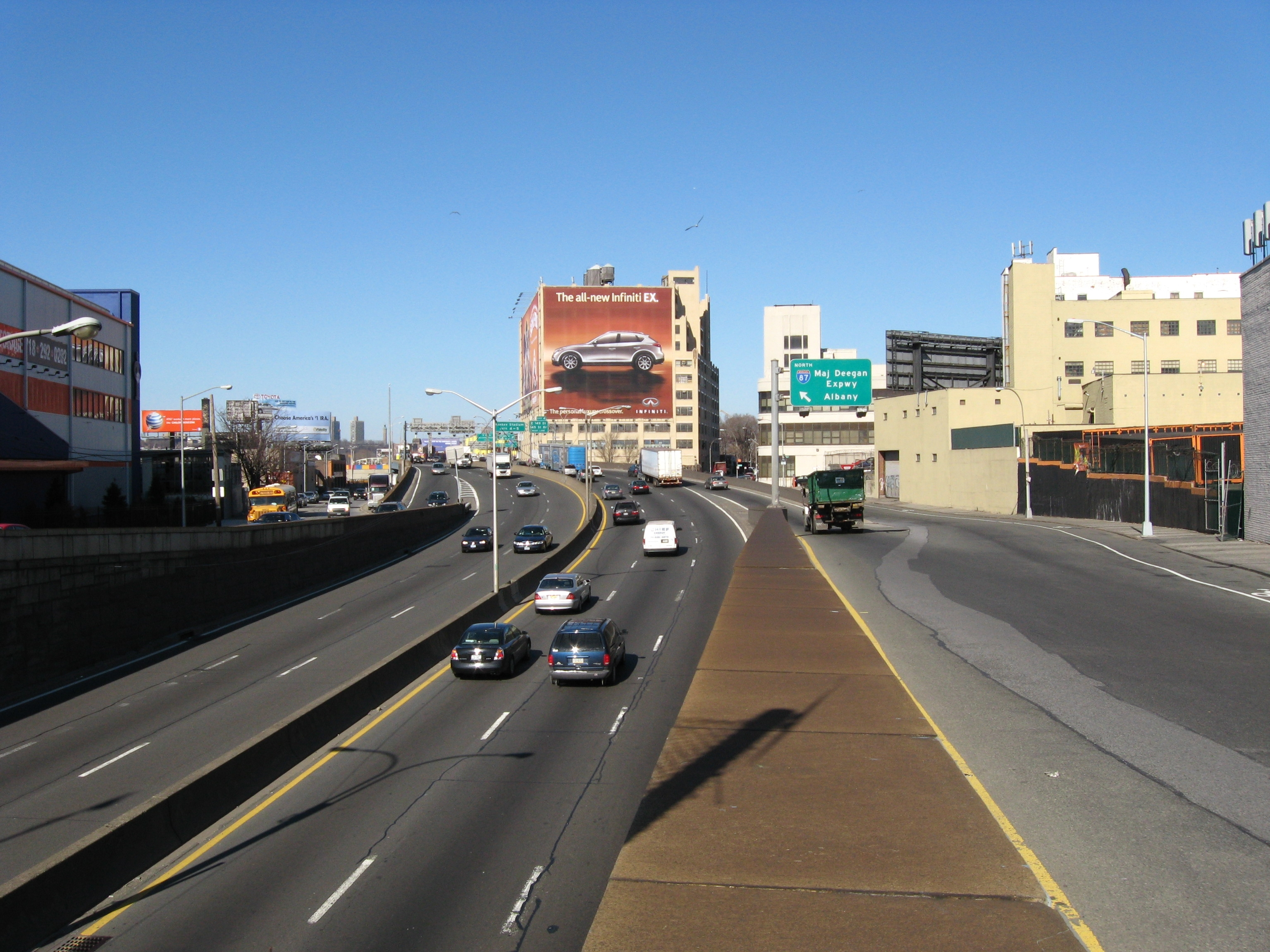
Looking north at the Deegan from 138th Street

I-87 and the Major Deegan Expressway begin in the Bronx at the northern approach to the Robert F. Kennedy Bridge, where it connects to the Bruckner Expressway (I-278) at a directional T interchange. The route heads west from the interchange, paralleling loosely with the Harlem River through Mott Haven. After one mile (1.6 km), the highway makes a turn to the north, mirroring a change in the nearby river's course. It passes by Yankee Stadium on its way to Highbridge, where the Deegan connects to the Cross Bronx Expressway (I-95 and US Route 1 [US 1]) at the eastern approach to the Alexander Hamilton Bridge. The Deegan remains in close proximity to the Harlem River until the waterway turns westward at Kingsbridge to form the northern edge of Manhattan. The Major Deegan Expressway is named after Major William Francis Deegan.

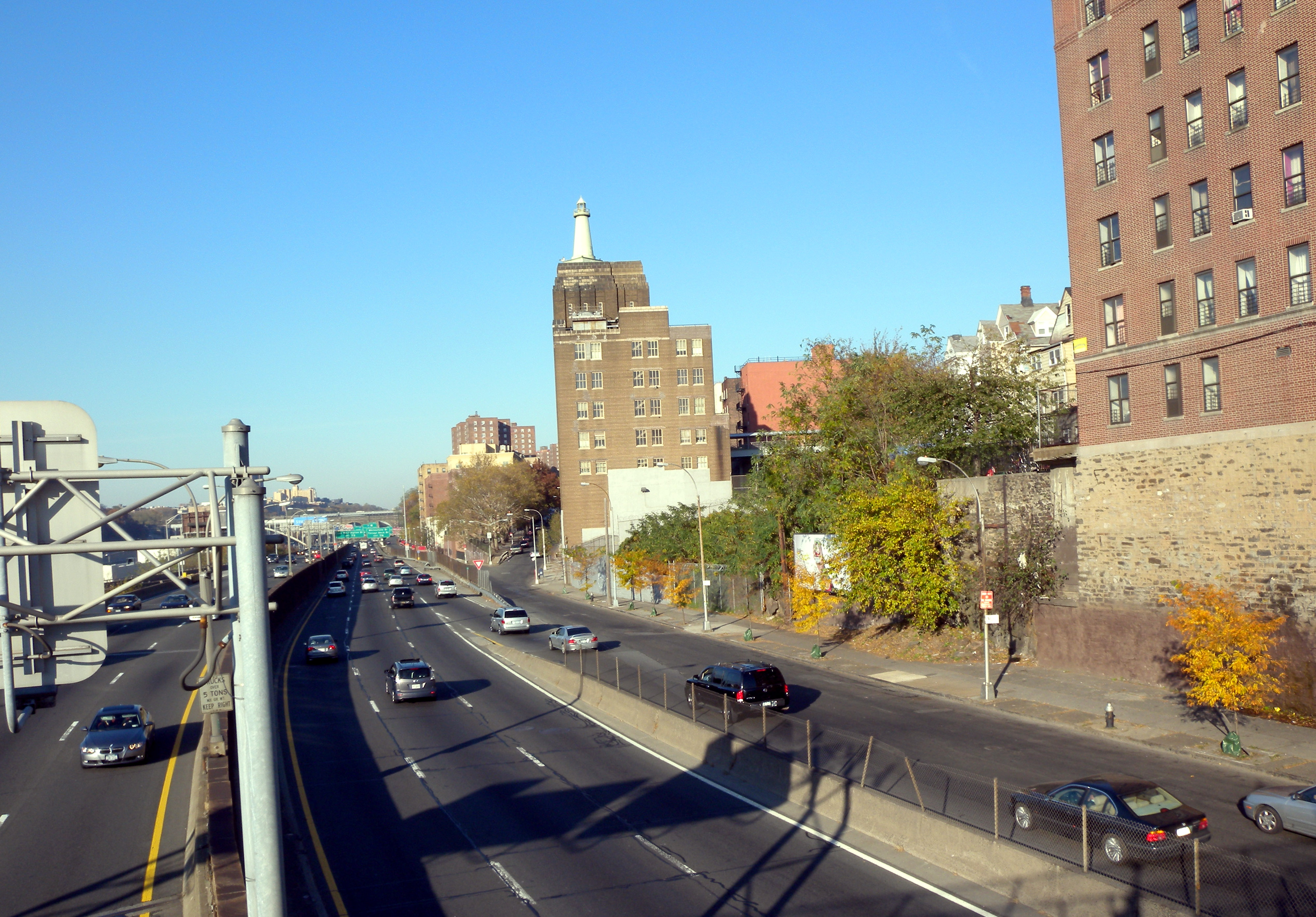
The Deegan in the West Bronx

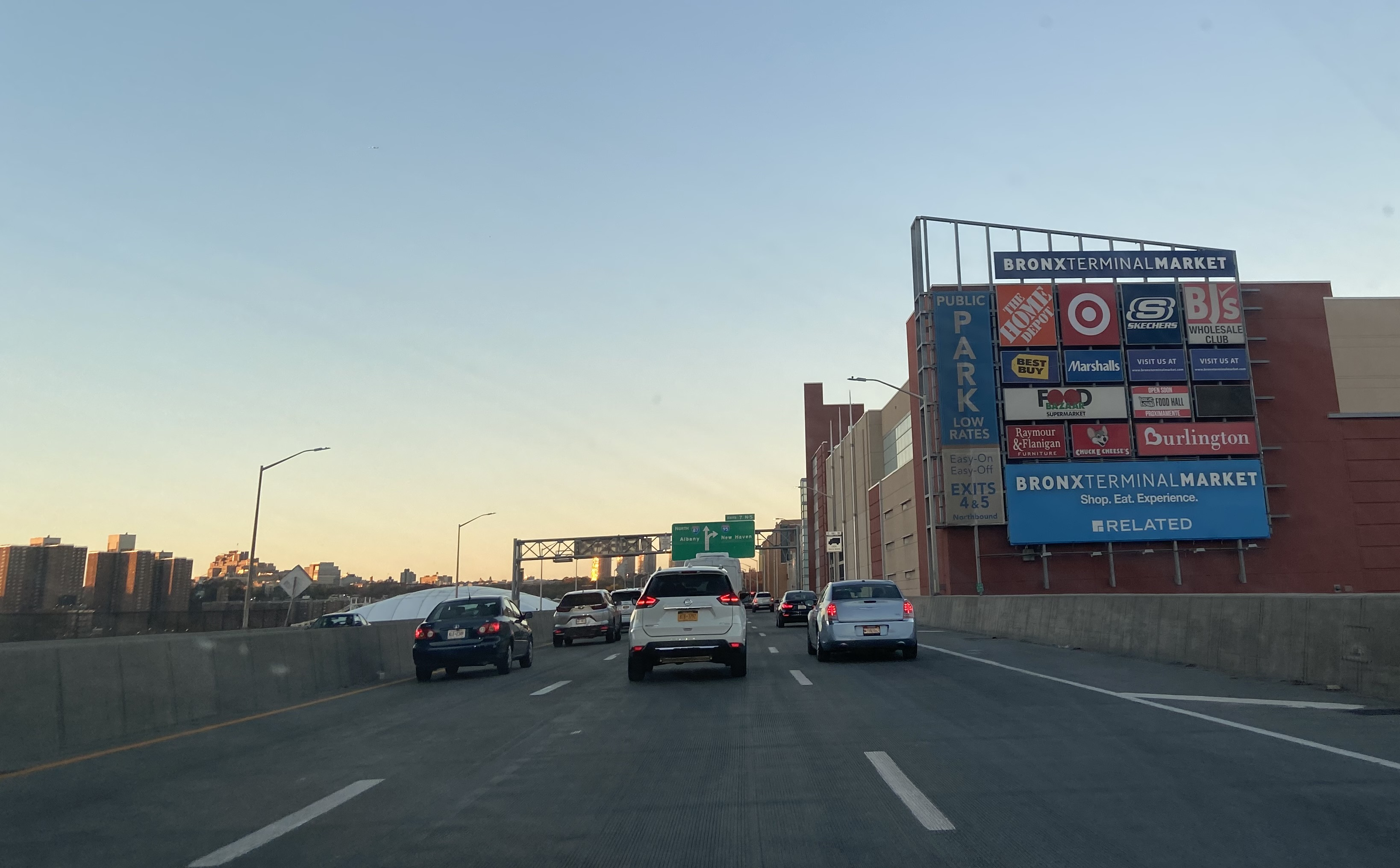
The Deegan passing by the Bronx Terminal Market

North of Kingsbridge, the expressway follows a generally northeasterly alignment, passing through the center of Van Cortlandt Park as it connects to Mosholu Parkway and Jerome Avenue. Mosholu Parkway also links the Deegan to the Henry Hudson and Saw Mill River parkways, which run parallel to the Major Deegan Expressway through the western Bronx and Manhattan. Past Jerome Avenue, the freeway gains a pair of service roads and heads north to the New York City line, where it becomes the New York State Thruway as it passes into Westchester County. The last northbound exit on the Deegan connects to McLean Avenue, located north of the city line in Yonkers. The exit 14 ramp leads to the service road in the Bronx but does not meet McLean Avenue until it crosses the county line. Southbound access to McLean Avenue is provided by Thruway exit 1 in Yonkers.

==== New York State Thruway ====
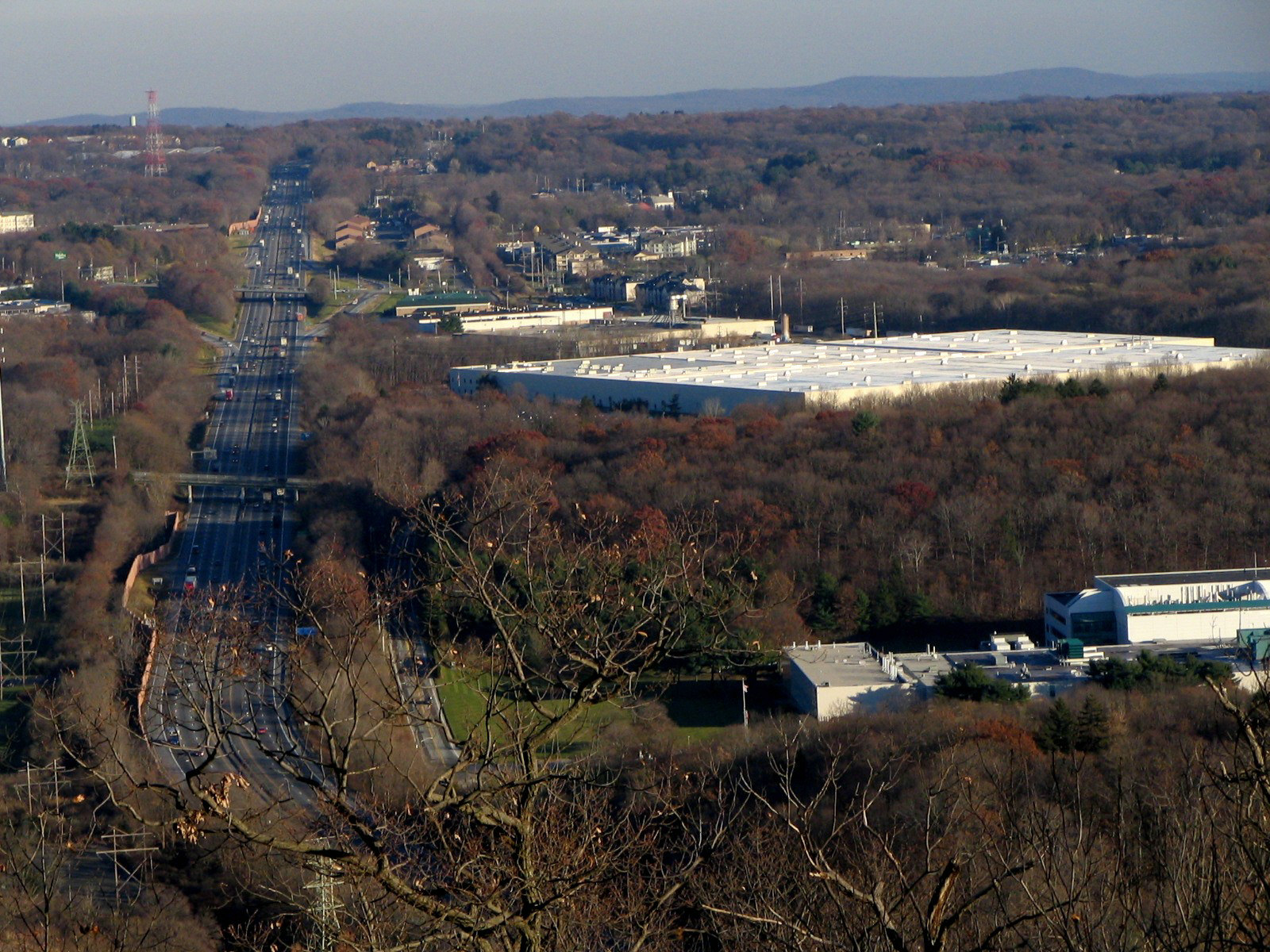
Looking east along I-87/I-287 (the Thruway) toward the Tappan Zee Bridge from Nordkop Mountain in Suffern

At the New York City–Yonkers border, I-87's mainline continues onto the New York State Thruway and northward through Yonkers and southern Westchester County. The mile markers and exit numbers reset at city limits where the Major Deegan Expressway becomes the Thruway. The first few exits serve various local streets, with exit 1 serving Hall Place, exit 2 providing access to Yonkers Raceway & Empire City Casino and exit 3 serving the Cross County Shopping Center. At exit 4, I-87 connects to the Cross County Parkway, an east–west parkway providing access to the Saw Mill River, Bronx River, and Hutchinson River parkways. The north–south parkways and I-95 run parallel to the Thruway through Southern Westchester. The Bronx River parkway leaves to the northeast midway through Yonkers, while the Saw Mill and Sprain Brook parkways follow the Thruway out of the city.

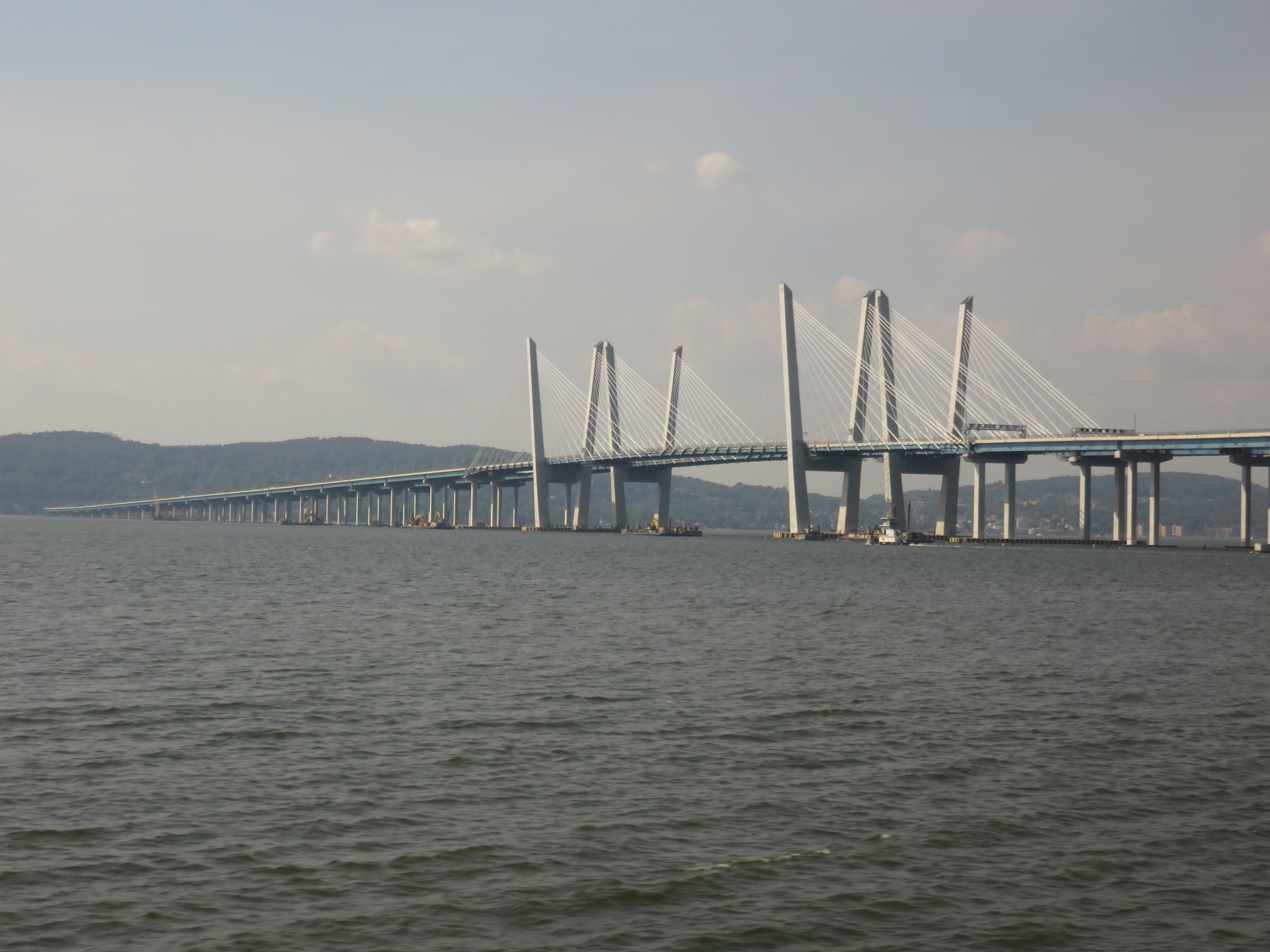
Tappan Zee Bridge

All three highways take generally parallel tracks to Elmsford, where I-87 directly intersects the Saw Mill River Parkway at exit 7A. Not far to the north is exit 8, a semi-directional T interchange with I-287 (the Cross Westchester Expressway). I-287 joins the Thruway here, following I-87 west across the Hudson River into Rockland County on the Tappan Zee Bridge. I-87 and I-287 remain overlapped for 15 miles (24 km) through the densely populated southern portion of Rockland County, meeting the Palisades Interstate Parkway and the Garden State Parkway Connector, with the latter providing access to the Garden State Parkway in New Jersey. The Thruway continues generally westward to Suffern, where I-87 and I-287 split at a large semi-directional T interchange (exit 15) only about a half mile (0.80 km) from the New Jersey border. At this point, I-287 heads south into New Jersey while I-87 and the Thruway turn northward into the valley of the Ramapo River.

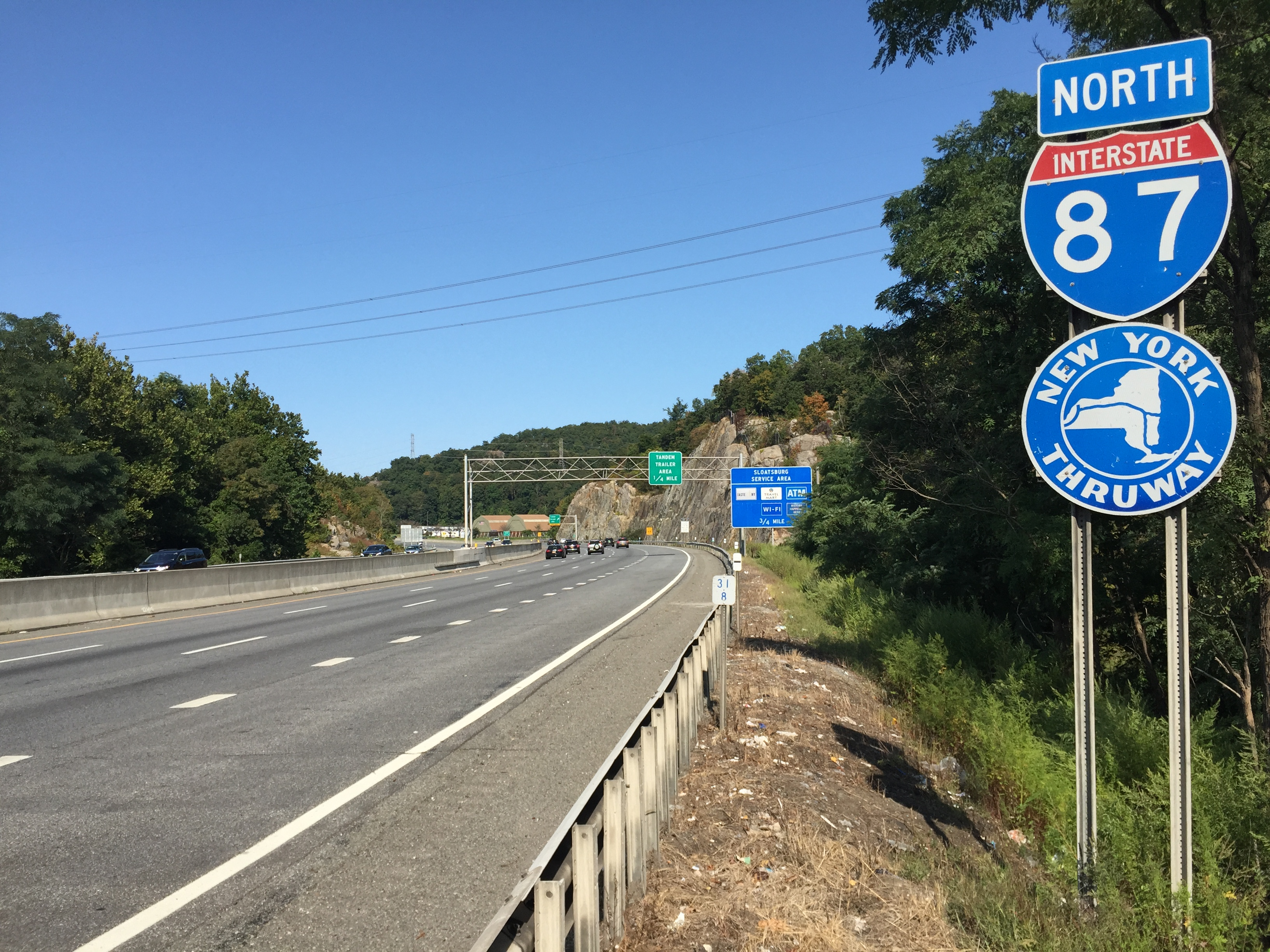
View north along the Thruway in Ramapo

The Thruway continues north as a six-lane tollway through the river valley toward Harriman, where it encounters the Woodbury toll gantry, the southeastern end of the main line's major closed toll system. The barrier is located on the mainline within exit 16 (NY 17), a trumpet interchange. Along with the mainline barrier in Harriman, a toll gantry exists on the exit 16 ramp midway between the Thruway and NY 17 exit 131 (NY 32). Now a completely tolled highway, the Thruway heads northward as it narrows to four lanes, roughly paralleling the Hudson River to the river's west as it serves the city of Newburgh, village of New Paltz, and city of Kingston, indirectly connecting to the short I-587 in the latter.

Past Kingston, the highway goes closer to the river as it parallels US 9W through the towns of Saugerties, Catskill, Coxsackie, and Ravena. Just north of Ravena, the Thruway meets the west end of the Berkshire Connector, a spur linking the Thruway mainline to the Massachusetts Turnpike 25 miles (40 km) to the east. The highway continues into the vicinity of Albany, where it connects to Troy via I-787 at exit 23 and intersects I-90 at exit 24. The latter of the two junctions is the busiest of the Thruway's exits, serving an estimated 27 million vehicles a year. I-87 then widens to six lanes and runs across the capital city's residential suburbs for six miles (9.7 km) to exit 24, a complex interchange with I-90. Traffic intending to either continue on I-87 or reach I-90 east must exit the Thruway here. At this point, I-87 leaves the Thruway to access the nearby south end of the toll-free Adirondack Northway, also known simply as the Northway, while I-90 merges in from the east to follow the Thruway toward Buffalo and then Pennsylvania.

=== Adirondack Northway ===
Off the Thruway, I-87 and I-90 overlap for a half mile (0.80 km) along I-90's toll-free path through the Albany area. The brief concurrency ends at exit 1 of the Adirondack Northway in Guilderland, a junction also numbered as exit 1 on I-90. The Adirondack Northway and I-87 are still separate routes that share the same path; the Northway itself actually begins not at I-87/I-90 but about one mile (1.6 km) south from its interchange, the Northway reaches its southern terminus at Western Ave (US 20), and then joins with I-87 for the rest of its route. I-87 turns to head north toward the Canada–United States border at Champlain while I-90 continues east toward downtown Albany and Rensselaer County. South of this point, the Northway feeds into a 0.86-mile (1.38 km) expressway spur known locally as Fuller Road Alternate, which links I-87 and I-90 to US 20. Fuller Road Alternate is designated as New York State Route 910F (NY 910F), an unsigned reference route, by NYSDOT. In 2004, NYSDOT ceremonially designated the entire 176-mile (283 km) Northway as the Adirondack Veterans Memorial Highway.

The Northway, the part of Interstate 87 (I-87) north of the New York State Thruway, was built in segments, which became I-87 as they were completed and linked to the pre-existing route. Construction began in the late 1950s on the portion of the Northway between the Thruway and NY 7 near Latham, and it was completed in 1960.

==== Albany and Saratoga counties ====
I-87 heads northeast from I-90 as a six-lane freeway with three lanes in each direction. It immediately traverses the Albany Pine Bush Preserve and passes west of Rensselaer Lake before crossing CSX Transportation's Hudson Subdivision and running parallel to Wolf Road, a business thoroughfare through the town of Colonie. Wolf Road itself begins adjacent to exit 2, a cloverleaf interchange with NY 5 (Central Avenue). Heading northbound, the ramp for exit 2E feeds directly into the intersection of NY 5 and Wolf Road, located just west of Colonie Center, one of the Capital District's largest enclosed shopping malls. I-87 continues to run alongside Wolf Road to exit 4, a modified diamond interchange serving County Route 151 (CR 151, named Albany Shaker Road) and Albany International Airport. Wolf Road ends south of the exit; however, another section begins north of the junction, carrying NY 155 away from the airport. Prior to the Northway, there was no break in Wolf Road; in essence, exit 4 was built on top of Wolf Road's intersection with Albany Shaker Road. I-87 and NY 155 meet at exit 5, with the latter routed along Watervliet Shaker Road.

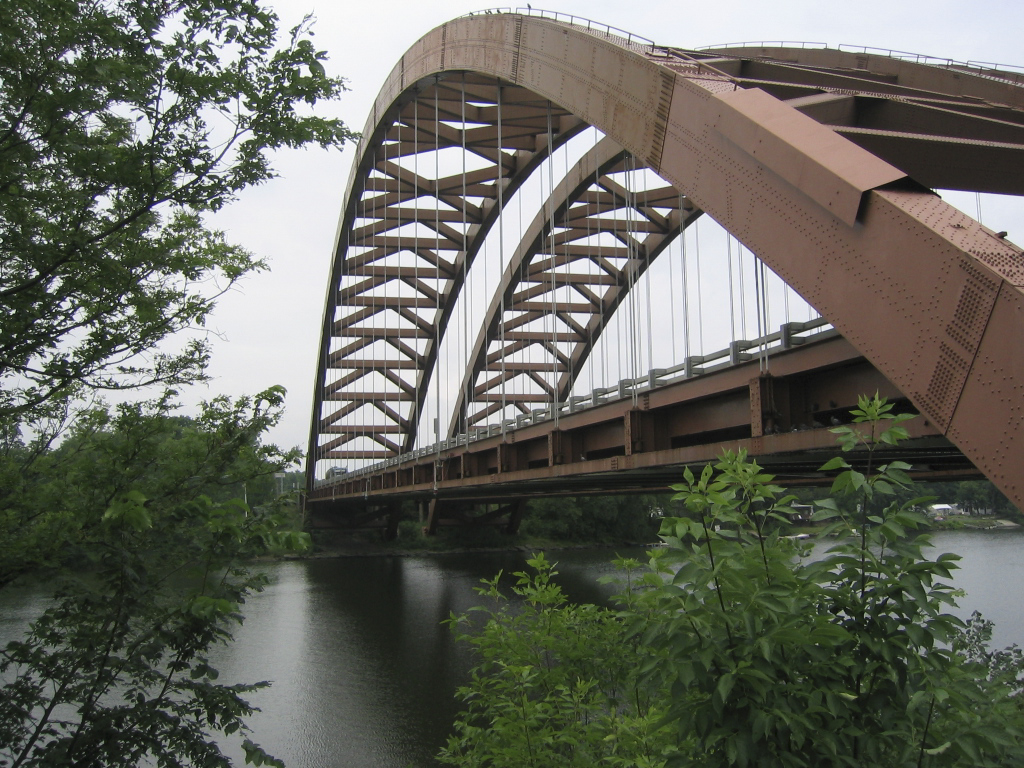
The Thaddeus Kosciusko Bridge carries I-87 (the Northway) over the Mohawk River north of Albany.

After a brief stretch of housing tracts, I-87 connects to NY 2 and NY 7 at exit 6, a single-point urban interchange, in a commercialized part of Latham. NY 7 joins I-87 here, following the freeway for roughly 0.8 miles (1.3 km) to exit 7, the west end of a limited-access highway previously known locally as Alternate Route 7. While NY 7 heads east toward Troy, I-87 continues north past gradually less commercialized areas as it approaches the northern county line. The businesses ultimately give way to stretches of homes and subdivisions as the highway crosses into Saratoga County by way of the Thaddeus Kosciusko Bridge, called by locals "the twin bridges", spanning the Mohawk River. The northern portion of the Northway through Colonie and Saratoga County is now a heavily traveled commuter route as a six-lane freeway. Since the highway's construction, Saratoga County has become the fastest growing area of the Capital District, and indeed all of upstate New York.

For its first few miles in Saratoga County, I-87 runs across lightly developed parts of the towns of Halfmoon and Clifton Park. Near exit 9, however, the freeway passes through the commercial center of Clifton Park as it connects to NY 146. Clifton Park Center, one of several shopping plazas at the junction, is situated southwest of the exit. Past exit 9, the commercial development subsides as I-87 traverses another area dominated by housing tracts. Just north of the exit, the freeway passes a rest area for northbound traffic. The freeway continues on, passing to the west of the centers of Round Lake at exit 11 and Malta at exit 12. The roadway then meets US 9 at Exit 13, a cloverleaf interchange providing access to Saratoga Spa State Park and downtown Saratoga Springs. I-87 turns slightly to the northeast and begins to loosely parallel the northwestern edge of Saratoga Lake as it crosses Kayaderosseras Creek and enters Saratoga Springs.

As the route travels the east side of Saratoga Springs, it meets NY 9P at exit 14. The junction is adjacent to the regionally popular Saratoga Race Course and thus receives heavy traffic during the racing season. A southbound-only entrance ramp exists off Nelson Avenue Extension about one mile (one point six kilometres) south of exit 14, designed to handle traffic exiting the track at Saratoga Race Course and the Saratoga Casino Hotel. The highway continues around the eastern edge of Saratoga Springs to exit 15, where the relatively undeveloped areas east of I-87 are briefly replaced by Wilton's commercial district along NY 50. As I-87 continues northeast through Wilton, it heads across significantly less developed areas, with open fields becoming the most common feature along the road. It continues into Moreau, connecting to US 9 and serving Moreau Lake State Park by way of exit 17, a once cloverleaf interchange being converted to a "Parclo A2" Partial cloverleaf interchange, before crossing the Hudson River and entering Warren County.

==== Warren and Essex counties ====
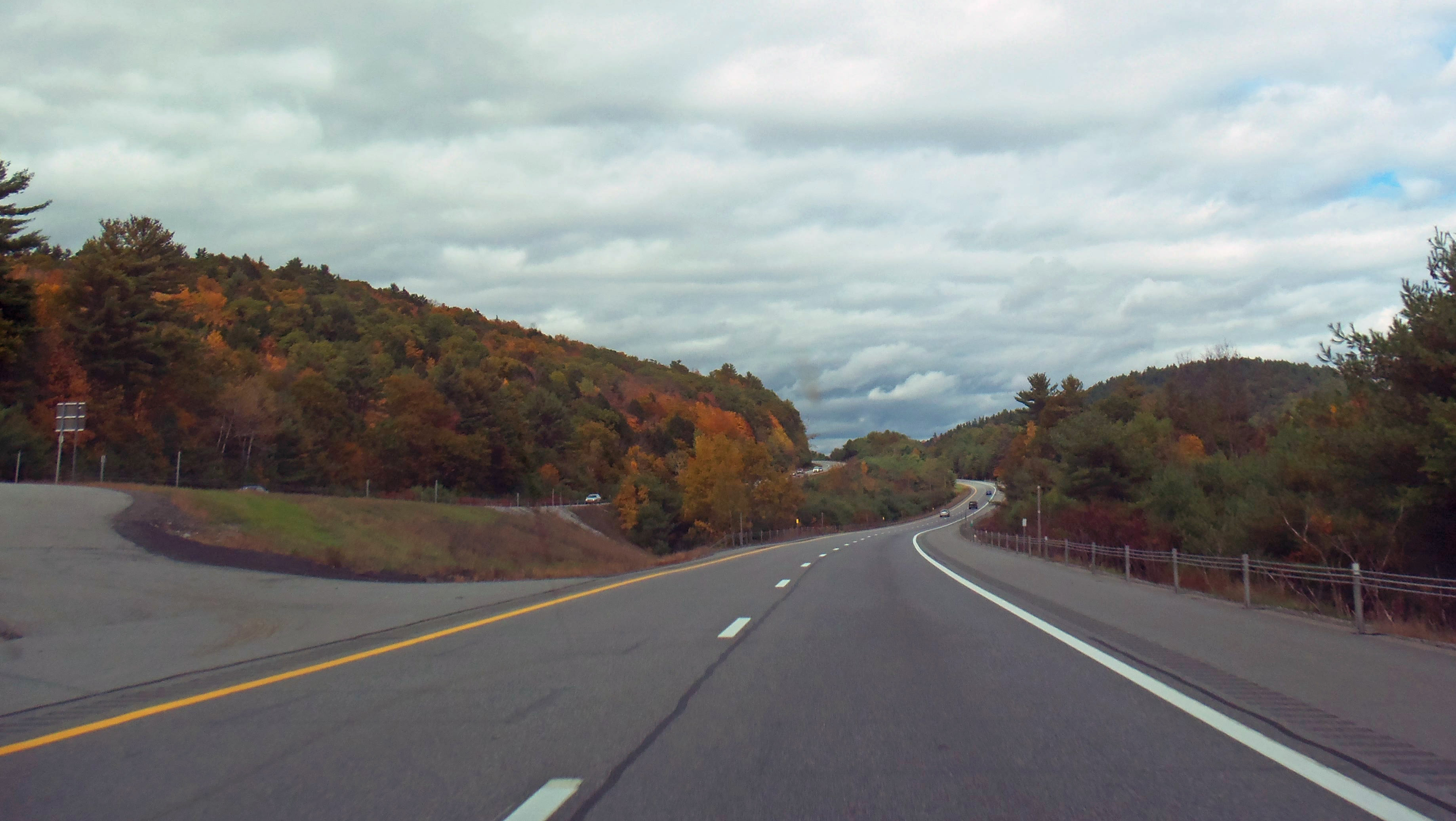
Northbound Northway in Warren County between exits 23 and 24

Between the bridge and exit 18, I-87 passes two rest areas, one for each direction. The road's northward course quickly brings it to the outskirts of Glens Falls, and as such the highway heads across another swath of residential neighborhoods. Exits 18 and 19 are the main exits for the city, with the latter connecting to NY 254 near Aviation Mall, located on NY 254 just west of the route's junction with US 9. A northwestern turn in the freeway takes I-87 past the Great Escape amusement park and lodge, both of which are accessed from exit 20 and NY 149. Past exit 20, I-87 runs across increasingly remote areas of Queensbury as the road enters Adirondack Park and heads toward Lake George. The freeway closely follows US 9 northwest to the village of Lake George, where I-87 meets NY 9N via exits 21 and 22. Route 9N veers to the northeast along the shore of Lake George as "Lake Shore Drive", toward the town of Bolton Landing, a popular village on the shore of Lake George with shops and restaurants. Exit 22 is the last exit before the Northway begins traversing approximately 90 miles (140 km) of mostly rural areas where the exits become farther apart. Here, the Northway narrows from six to four lanes, preparing for the more rural areas and rugged terrain that follow.

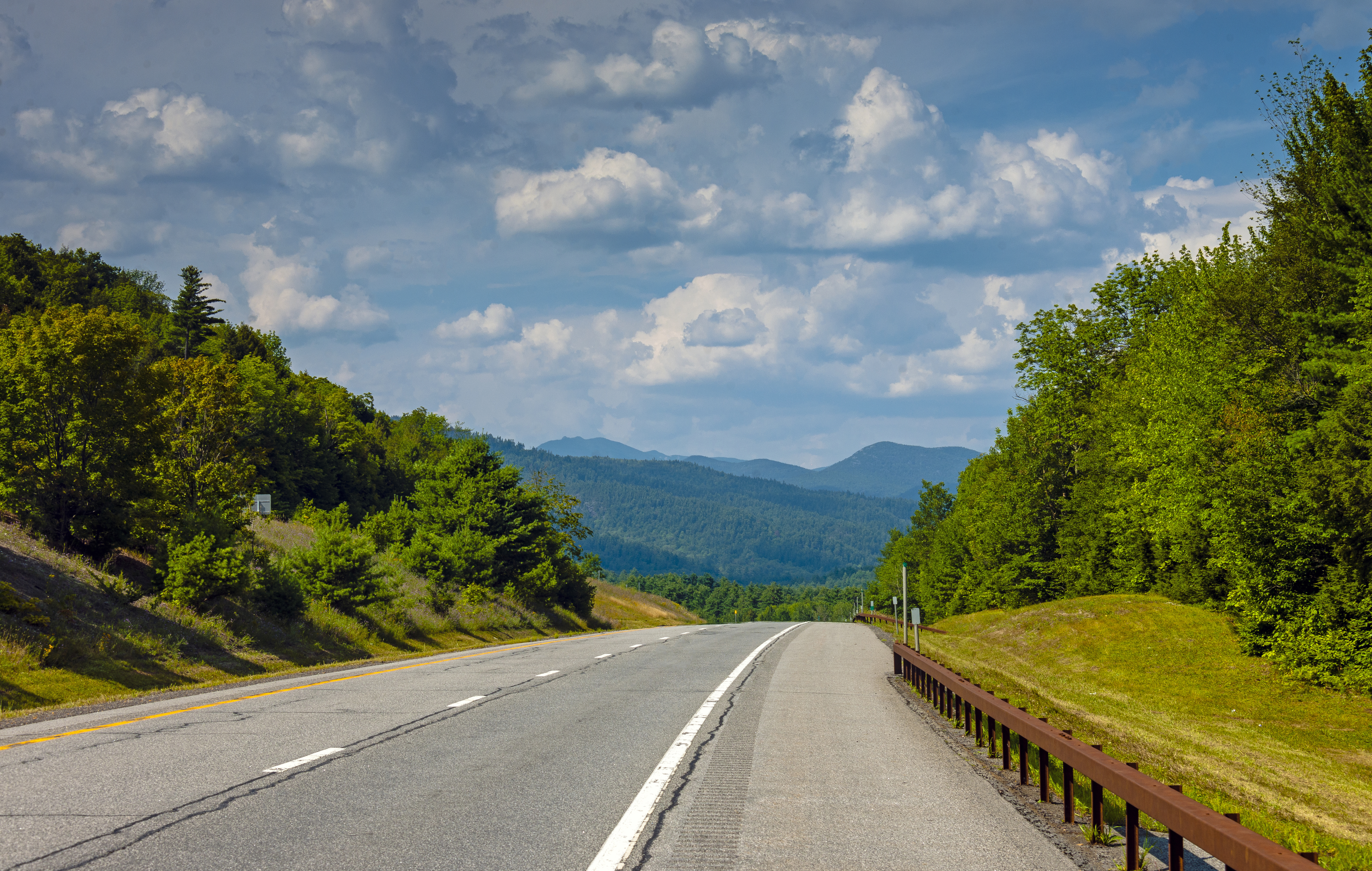
View to High Peaks region from the northbound side of the Northway in Schroon Lake

North of Lake George, the Northway runs alongside US 9 to Warrensburg, a small town on the Schroon River served by exit 23. The view straight ahead on the northbound side from this interchange acts as an unofficial gateway to the Adirondacks, with tall mountains acting as a backdrop to a straight stretch of highway. While US 9 heads northwest into the Warrensburg to connect to NY 28, I-87 turns northward to follow the east bank of the Schroon River for 17 miles (27 km) through a deep, remote valley. The Northway reaches exit 24 while in this valley, which once again serves the town of Bolton Landing. Exit 25 serves NY 8 at a diamond interchange. The stretch away from US 9 ends at exit 26, where I-87 reconnects to US 9 in Pottersville. At this point, I-87 makes a slight turn to the northeast to follow US 9 as the latter road runs along the western shoreline of Schroon Lake. Both roads pass a handful of lakefront properties on their way into Essex County and the town of Schroon Lake, where the lake comes to an end and NY 74 begins its eastward trek to Ticonderoga at exit 28. The Schroon River resumes north of the exit, and I-87 and US 9 follow the river and its rural valley to the northeast for 15 miles (24 km) to the town of North Hudson.

In North Hudson, the valley becomes less pronounced as the Schroon River reaches its source near exit 30. Here, US 9 and I-87 cross paths again, with the former heading northwest toward Keene and the latter continuing northeast in a narrow valley formed by Ash Craft Brook. After five miles (8.0 km), the stream reaches its source at Lincoln Pond, leaving the Northway to climb in elevation and wind its way northeastward across the surrounding mountains. It reaches slightly more level ground in Westport, where I-87 connects to NY 9N at exit 31. From here, the highway takes a generally northerly track across the Boquet River to the town of Lewis, rejoining US 9 as both roads head toward Clinton County. They split again after seven miles (11 km) as US 9 veers more easterly than I-87 to serve Keeseville. The Northway, meanwhile, heads to the northwest, bypassing the village to cross the Ausable River and enter Clinton County.

==== Clinton County ====
Just across the county line, I-87 intersects NY 9N again at exit 34 in Keeseville, finally leaving the more rural, mountainous areas of the Adirondack Mountains and entering a more populated region. Exit 34 is the southernmost junction to feature bilingual guide signs in English and French due to the road's proximity to Quebec. Beyond NY 9N, the Northway curves to the north, running along the west side of Keeseville before entering another rural but fairly level stretch that follows I-87 out of Adirondack Park. Now outside the park, the highway encounters more frequent pockets of development as it follows NY 22 into the town of Plattsburgh. Just inside the town line, the Northway crosses over the Salmon River and intersects NY 22 at exit 36, a junction serving nearby Plattsburgh International Airport. While NY 22 heads northeast into the city of Plattsburgh, I-87 runs north through its western suburbs, passing over the Saranac River and intersecting NY 3 at exit 37. The Northway and NY 22 meet again north of downtown at exit 38.

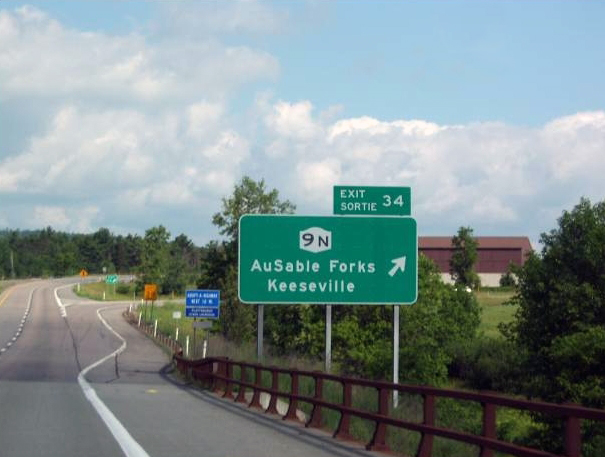
Bilingual sign for exit 34 (NY 9N) in Keeseville

The section of I-87 between exits 38 and 39 crosses a marshy area surrounding Dead Creek, a stream feeding into nearby Plattsburgh Bay. Access to the bay shore is provided off to the northeast by exit 39, a modified cloverleaf interchange for NY 314. Continuing away from the junction, I-87 comes within one mile (1.6 km) of Lake Champlain as it follows US 9 away from Plattsburgh and northward across open, rolling fields in the towns of Beekmantown and Chazy. Outside of the hamlet of Chazy, the Northway begins to run across a series of wetlands along the west side of US 9. The marshy terrain follows I-87 into the town of Champlain, where I-87 encounters the northernmost community along its course, the village of Champlain. I-87 veers slightly westward to avoid the village, and in doing so it meets US 11 at exit 42, a diamond interchange just west of the village limits.

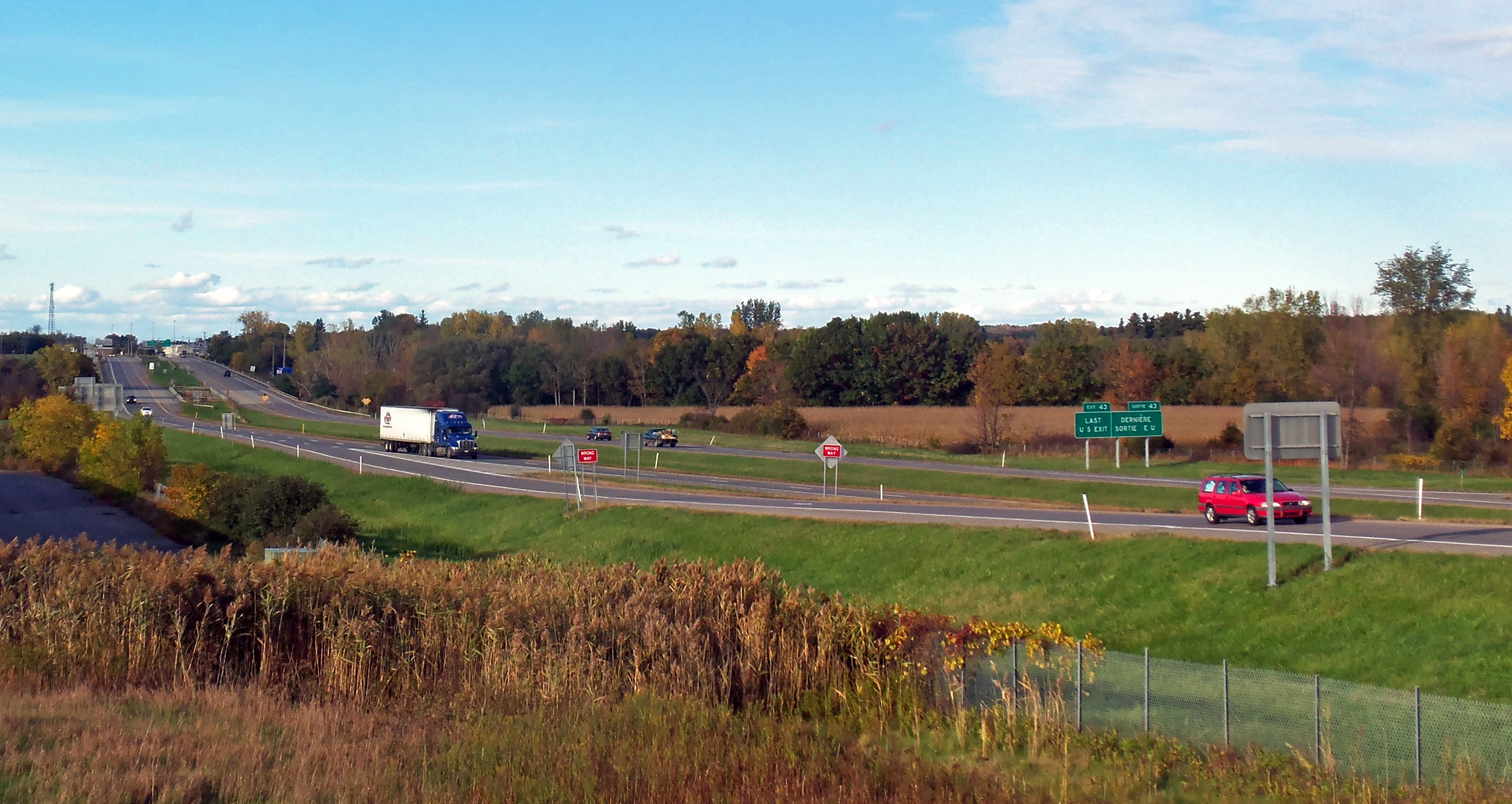
Approach to Canada–United States border in Champlain

I-87 takes a northerly track from US 11, crossing the Chazy River and briefly entering the village limits, where it runs past a series of homes and businesses built up along nearby US 9. As both roads head north out of the village, US 9 connects to the Northway one last time (also the northern terminus of US 9) at exit 43, the last interchange on I-87 before the Canadian border. Past the exit, the highway doubles in width, becoming eight lanes wide as it begins to run past the customs facilities on the American side of the border. The Northway and I-87 end shortly thereafter at the Canadian border, where the highway continues past the Champlain–St. Bernard de Lacolle Border Crossing into Quebec as A-15 toward Montreal.

== History ==
=== Designation and early construction ===
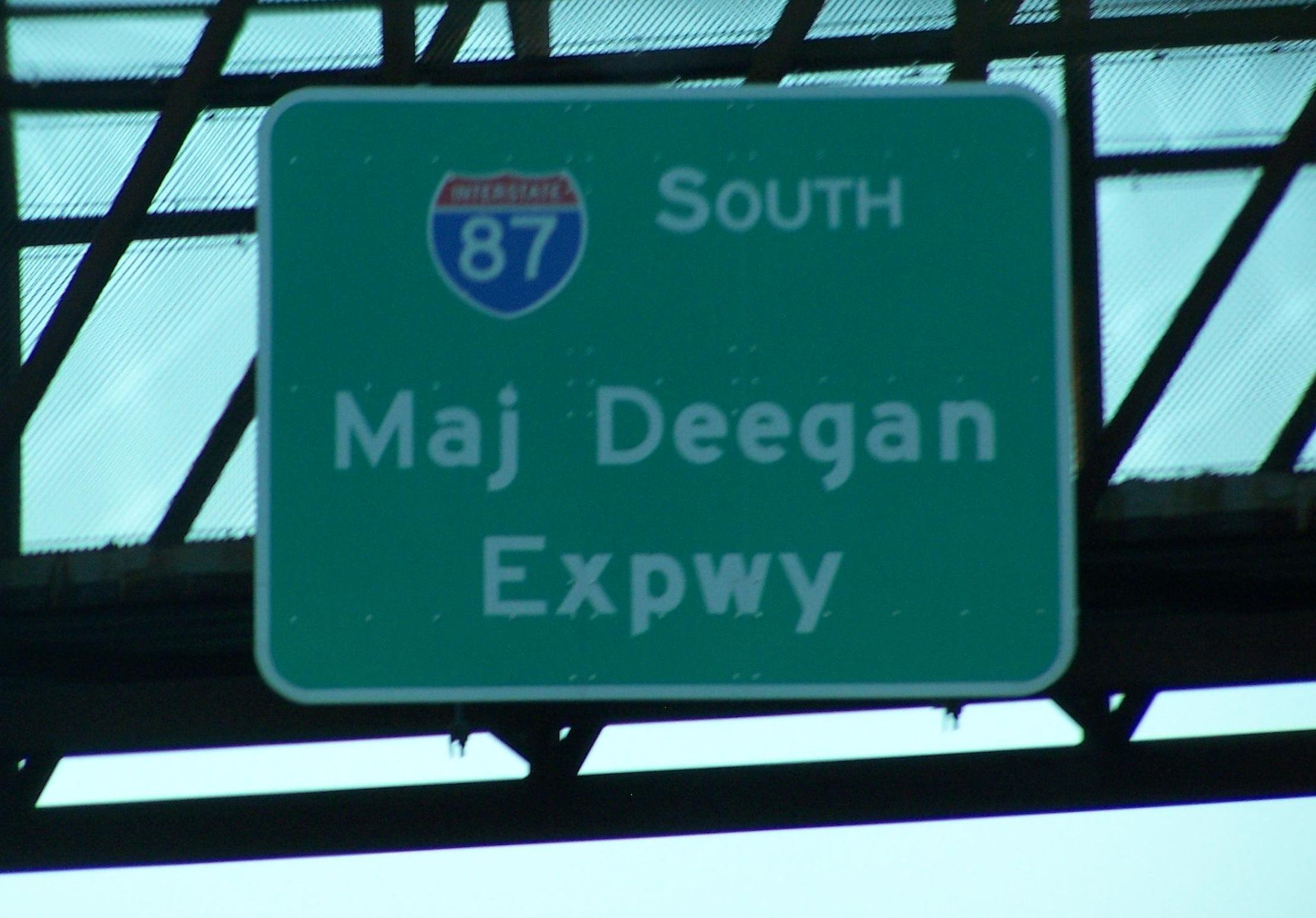
Overhead signage at the northern terminus of the Major Deegan Expressway

The origins of the Major Deegan Expressway date back to 1936 when the Regional Plan Association concluded that in order to relieve New York City's traffic problems, a limited-access, truck-accessible expressway should be built on the west side of the Bronx. This route would connect the brand-new Triborough Bridge to the proposed New York State Thruway in Westchester County. A 1.5-mile (2.4 km) section of the expressway from the bridge to the Grand Concourse was completed in April 1939. The highway was adorned with Whitestone-style light posts placed every 75 feet (23 m) of the six-lane highway, each of which were 12 feet (3.7 m) in width. The expressway was designated as New York State Route 1B (NY 1B) c. 1941; however, the designation was removed by 1947. In 1945, public works planner Robert Moses proposed extending the highway to the proposed Thruway. Construction on the extension began in 1950, and the new route was opened in 1956. The Major Deegan Expressway is named for William Francis Deegan, who died in 1932. He was an architect, a major in the Army Corps of Engineers, and a Democratic political leader in New York City.

I-87 was assigned on August 14, 1957, as part of the establishment of the Interstate Highway System. The highway initially utilized the preexisting New York State Thruway from Albany to Newburgh and in lower Westchester County, and the Major Deegan Expressway in New York City. From Newburgh to the Elmsford area, I-87 was to follow a new highway running parallel to US 9 northward along the eastern bank of the Hudson River to Fishkill. I-87 would then have followed the proposed I-84 across the Hudson to rejoin the Thruway outside of Newburgh. After the Hudson River Expressway proposal was cancelled in the 1960s, the alignment of I-87 was shifted farther east to follow a newly completed freeway in the Route 22 corridor that started at I-287 in White Plains, then cut north through the extreme southwest corner of Connecticut before reentering New York and reaching I-84 at Brewster. I-87 then followed I-84 west to Newburgh. In 1970, the I-87 designation was shifted to the New York State Thruway between Newburgh and the Deegan Expressway; its previous alignment between Brewster and White Plains was redesignated as I-684. Meanwhile, all of the Adirondack Northway, the portion of I-87 slated to extend from Albany north to the Canada–United States border, had yet to be built. Fuller Road Alternate, the spur leading south from the Adirondack Northway to US 20, was originally intended to be part of the Southern Albany Expressway, a proposed highway which would have connected the Northway with I-787 and run parallel to the Thruway between exits 23 and 24.

Map of NY 912Q, once part of I-87

The Northway was built in segments, which became I-87 as they were completed and linked to the preexisting route. Construction began in the late 1950s on the portion of the Northway between the Thruway and NY 7 near Latham. This segment was open to traffic by 1960, by which time work had begun on two additional segments from Latham to Malta (at NY 67) and from US 9 in northern Saratoga County to US 9 and NY 149 midway between Glens Falls and Lake George village. The expressway was completed between Latham and Clifton Park (NY 146) and from US 9 south of Glens Falls to the Hudson River c. 1961. The US 9–NY 149 section of the highway was finished on May 26, 1961, at a total cost of $9.5 million (equivalent to $76.1 million in 2024). Work on the Latham–Malta segment concluded on November 22 of that year with the opening of a $6.6-million (equivalent to $52.9 million in 2024) piece between NY 146 and NY 67. When the Latham–Malta segment was opened, it featured one of the few railroad grade crossings on an Interstate Highway, just south of the Thaddeus Kosciusko Bridge over the Mohawk River. This at-grade crossing was removed within a couple of years when the railroad line was cut backward and the crossing was no longer needed. Construction on the portion of highway between the two segments began c. 1962. The 1.8-mile (2.9 km) part between NY 9P and NY 50 near Saratoga Springs was finished on July 19, 1963, and the entire NY 67–US 9 segment was completed by 1964. An extension linking NY 149 to NY 9N south of Lake George village opened in mid-1963.

By July 1963, the Northway was completed from the Canada–United States border south to exit 34 at Keeseville. Additionally, the existing Albany–Lake George section was extended slightly by May 1966 to serve the northern part of Lake George. At the time, I-87 curved around the western outskirts of the village to end at NY 9N north of the village on a highway built c. 1964. In mid-1966, the state opened a $23-million (equivalent to $169 million in 2024) section of the Northway between Lake George and exit 26 at Pottersville. I-87 was reconfigured slightly near Lake George as a result: instead of heading east to NY 9N, it continued north on a parallel routing to US 9. The Northway's former routing to NY 9N, known infrequently today as the Lake George Connector, is now NY 912Q, an unsigned reference route 0.66 miles (1.06 km) in length. NY 912Q has one intermediate interchange with US 9. On March 5, 1967, the Lake George–Pottersville portion of I-87 was chosen as America's Most Scenic New Highway of 1966 by Parade. It became the second New York highway to win the award, as a stretch of NY 17 in Broome and Delaware counties was selected for the title in 1964.

=== Filling the gaps ===
The gap in the Northway between Pottersville and Keeseville was narrowed considerably by July 1967 with the completion of a 25-mile (40 km) segment from Pottersville to exit 30 at Underwood. It was closed further on July 25, 1967, with the opening of a three-mile (4.8 km) stretch near Keeseville between exits 34 and 33. The last section of the Northway to be built, a 30-mile (48 km) stretch between Underwood and Keeseville (exit 33), was finished on August 31, 1967. The completion of the Northway linked New York City with Montreal by way of a direct, limited-access highway, with I-87 becoming A-15 at the Canada–United States border. The total cost to build the Adirondack Northway was $208 million (equivalent to $1.49 billion in 2024).

Another gap in I-87 existed in downstate New York, as the plan to build I-87 along the proposed Hudson River Expressway had been scrapped by 1962. Instead, I-87 was now proposed to begin in Port Chester and follow a new routing through Purchase, Armonk, and Katonah to Brewster, where it would join I-84. The routing was modified slightly by 1968: I-87 still began in New York City, then overlapped with I-287 east to Purchase. From there, I-87 headed north along the now-open expressway to Armonk, where it ended at NY 22. Another portion of the highway, from Goldens Bridge (NY 138) to Brewster, was open as well while the part from Armonk to Katonah was under construction. This segment, as well as the part from Katonah to Goldens Bridge, was completed by 1971. On January 1, 1970, I-87 was rerouted between Elmsford and Newburgh to follow the mainline of the Thruway instead, leaving the Purchase–Brewster freeway to become I-684.

=== Tappan Zee Bridge replacement ===
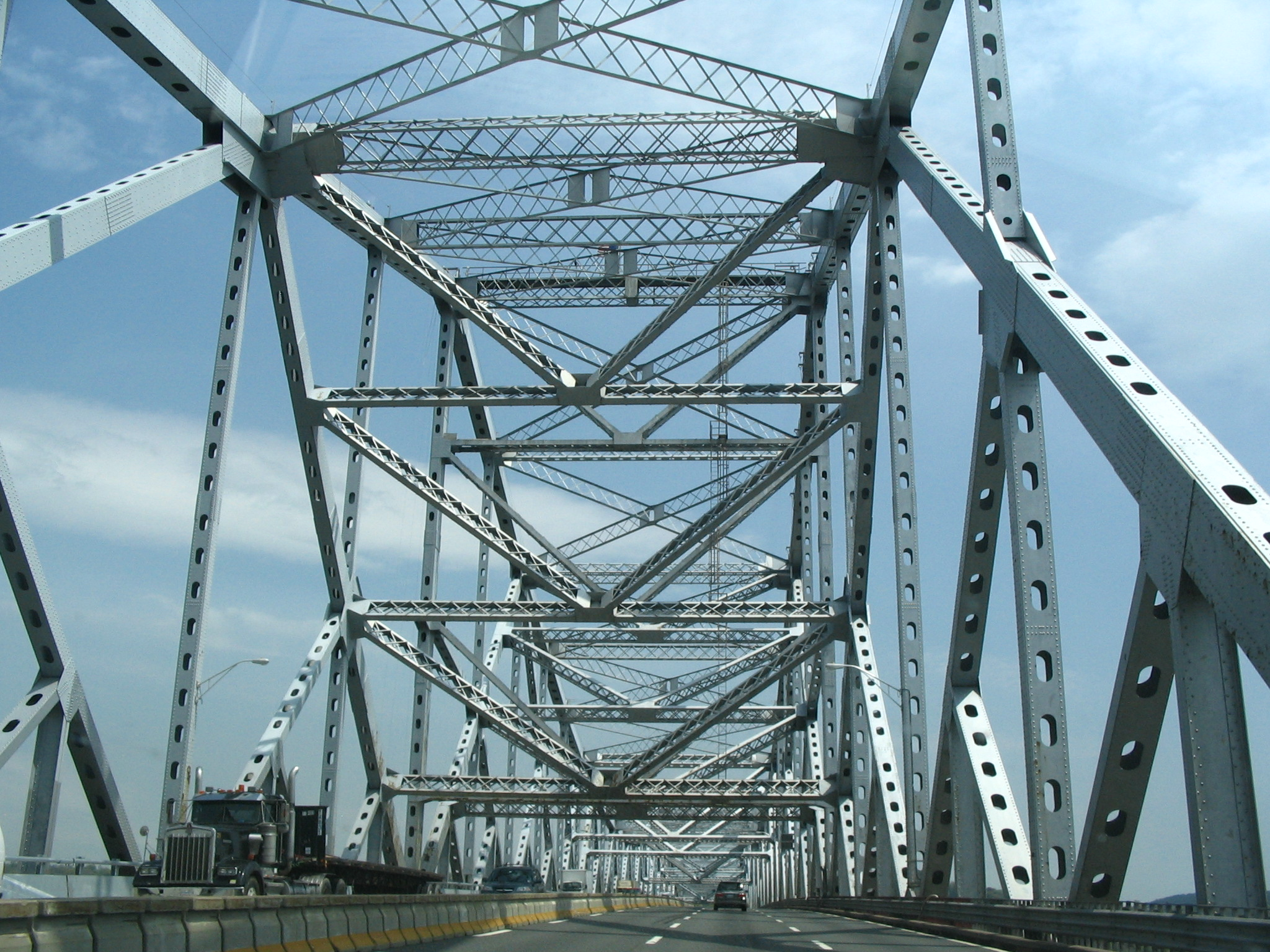
Original Tappan Zee Bridge

The original Tappan Zee Bridge, carrying the concurrency of New York State Thruway, I-87, and I-287, was a cantilever bridge built during 1952–55. The bridge was three miles (4.8 km) long and spanned the Hudson at its second-widest point. Before its replacement in 2017, the deteriorating structure carried an average of 138,000 vehicles per day, substantially more traffic than its designed capacity. During its first decade, the bridge carried fewer than 40,000 vehicles per day. Part of the justification for replacing the bridge stems from its construction immediately following the Korean War on a low budget of only $81 million (equivalent to $738 million in 2024). Unlike other major bridges in New York metropolitan area, the Tappan Zee was designed to last only 50 years. The Federal Highway Administration (FHWA) issued a report in October 2011 designating the Tappan Zee's replacement to be a dual-span twin bridge.

Construction officially began in October 2013, with the new spans being built to the north of the existing bridge. The new bridge connects to the existing highway approaches of I-87 and I-287 on both river banks. The northbound/westbound span opened on August 25, 2017. Southbound/eastbound traffic remained on the old bridge until October 6, 2017. At that point, southbound/eastbound traffic shifted to the westbound span of the new bridge and the old bridge closed. The bridge's eastbound span opened to traffic on September 11, 2018. Upon completion, the new Tappan Zee Bridge became one of the longest cable-stayed spans in the nation.

In June 2017, the Tappan Zee Bridge was renamed the Governor Mario M. Cuomo Bridge. The renaming resulted in controversy from the public who wanted to keep the name to honor Tappan Indians and Dutch who previously resided in the area. In August 2019, some signs for the bridge were replaced because they did not include the governor's middle initial in the name.

=== Other developments ===
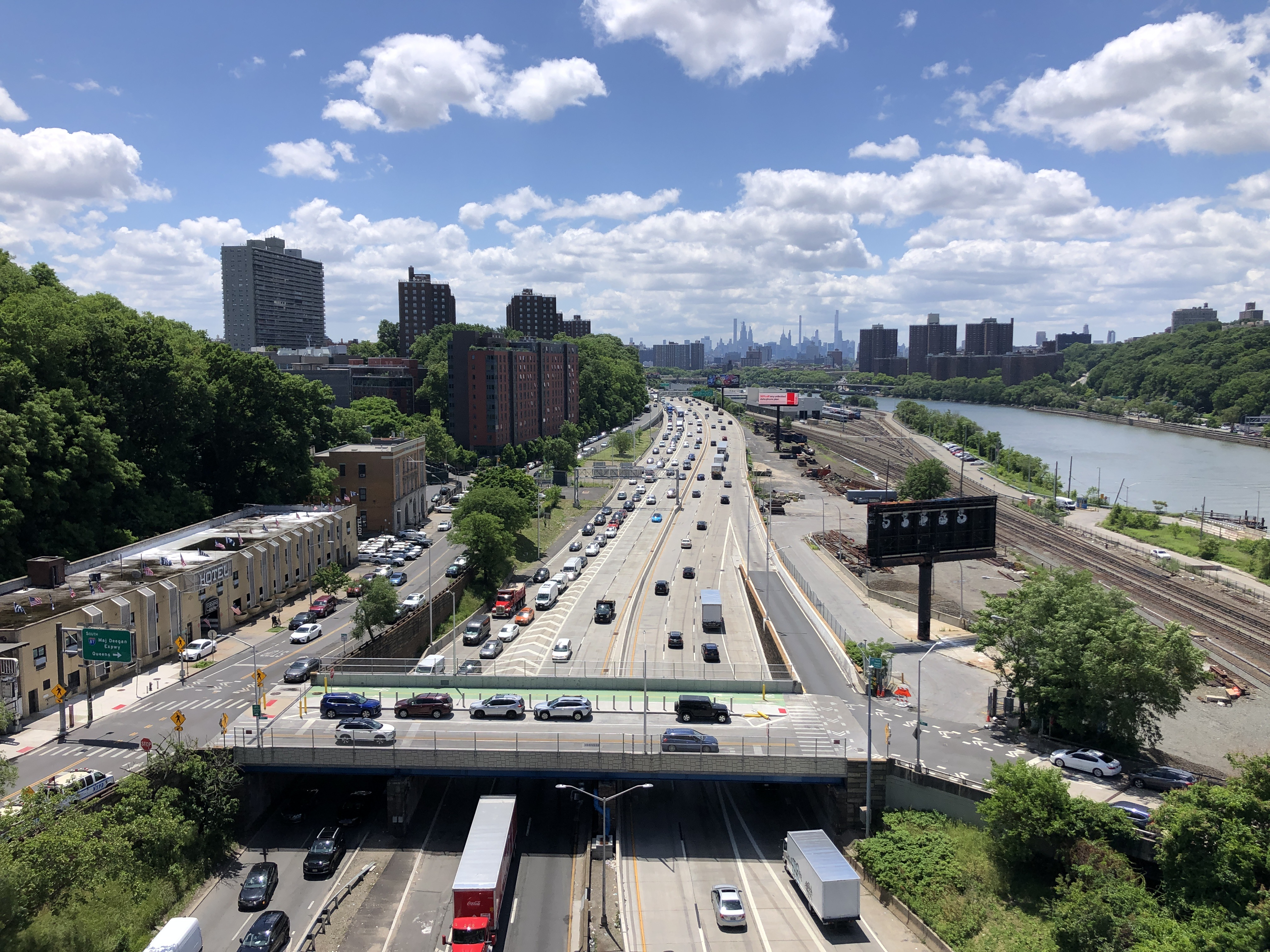
The Deegan Expressway/I-87 southbound viewed from the High Bridge in the Bronx

In the wake of former New York Yankees player Joe DiMaggio's death on March 8, 1999, Governor George Pataki proposed renaming the Deegan Expressway to the "Joe DiMaggio Highway." However, New York City Mayor Rudy Giuliani favored renaming the West Side Highway for DiMaggio instead. Pataki agreed to Giuliani's proposal one week later.

A long stretch of the Northway through the Adirondack Park had been an unserved zone for cellular telephone service. In 2007, a driver who crashed off the road was unable to summon help, prompting messages from local governments to telephone companies to add new wireless towers to address the problem and warning signs to inform travelers of the so-called dark zone. Throughout this area, roadside emergency call boxes were located approximately every two miles (3.2 km) on both sides of the roadway. These boxes used a two-way ultra high frequency radio network to connect directly to New York State Police dispatchers. In February 2023, the New York State police announced that the call box system was being decommissioned and would be removed completely by Fall 2023. The first of 13 new cellular phone towers along I-87 was installed in October 2008. A second cellular phone tower was completed just one month later.

Exit 6 on the Adirondack Northway was originally a diamond interchange. Construction to convert the junction into a single-point urban interchange began in mid-2008 and was completed on September 12, 2010. The total cost of the project was $41.9 million (equivalent to $58.7 million in 2024).

==== Albany Airport Connector ====
Until October 2019, there was no exit 3 on the Northway section of I-87, as this number was reserved for an interchange with the now-canceled I-687. A project to improve motorist access to the Albany International Airport at exit 4 took place in the late 2010s. The two old deteriorating bridges at exit 4, which had carried 102,000 vehicles a day, were replaced. Once the new replacement bridges were built, the old bridges were demolished. Construction began in February 2015 and was completed on October 31, 2015.

In August 2018, plans were announced to build a new exit 3 on the Northway, providing more direct access from both directions to Albany International Airport. The project was completed by Lancaster Development and Tully Construction at a cost of $50 million, with a target completion date of mid-2020. As part of the interchange, a flyover ramp was constructed over the Northway, allowing northbound and traffic direct access to Albany Shaker Road/NY 155 near the Desmond Hotel Albany. Southbound traffic was able to both exit and enter to/from the connector.

The southbound entrance for the connector (exit 3) opened on September 27, 2019, while the southbound exit opened the next month. Traffic signals were installed at the intersection of Albany Shaker Road and the connector. The northbound exit opened in November 2019. Other changes completed as part of the project include:

- Exit 4 on I-87 northbound was changed to a right turn only onto Wolf Road.
- Exit 4 on I-87 southbound was changed to a right turn only onto Old Wolf Road.
- A new direct entrance ramp was built from exit 5 (Watervliet-Shaker Road/NY 155) to I-87 southbound.
- Turn lanes, sidewalks, and medians were added to Albany Shaker Road between the intersections with the flyover ramps and Wolf Road. A new shared use path was built along Albany Shaker Road between the intersections with the flyover ramps and Albany International Airport.
- A new noise wall along I-87 northbound was built between exits 4 and 5.

Afternoon traffic was expected to be reduced by 54 percent, and morning traffic was expected to decrease by 29 percent. During construction, the project received criticism over the fact that some of the ramps were built on land sacred to three Native American tribes; the Stockbridge–Munsee, St. Regis Mohawk and Delaware. Murals were supposed to be installed on the exit 3 overpass, but the murals had still not been installed after the completion of all work on exit 3 in late 2020. The murals were finally installed in early 2021.

== Exit list ==
The mileposts below follow actual signage, even though the route is continuous. For the Bronx section of I-87, mile 0.00 is just north of the Robert F. Kennedy Bridge. For the Thruway section of I-87, mile 0.00 is at the Yonkers–Bronx city line. For the Northway section of I-87, mile 0.00 is just north of the overpass with I-90.

County	Location	mi	km	Exit	Destinations	Notes
The Bronx	Port Morris	0.00	0.00	–	I-278 east (Bruckner Expressway) – New Haven	Southern terminus
The Bronx	Port Morris	0.27	0.43	–	Bruckner Boulevard / East 135th Street	Northbound entrance only
The Bronx	Mott Haven	0.30	0.48	–	I-278 Toll west (RFK Bridge) – Manhattan, Queens	Southbound exit and northbound entrance; exit 47 on I-278
The Bronx	Mott Haven	0.40	0.64	1	Brook Avenue	Southbound exit only
The Bronx	Mott Haven	0.56	0.90	2	Willis Avenue to Third Avenue Bridge	No southbound entrance
The Bronx	Mott Haven	0.80– 1.15	1.29– 1.85	3	Grand Concourse / East 138th Street / Madison Avenue Bridge	Signed for Grand Concourse northbound, Madison Avenue Bridge southbound
The Bronx	Mott Haven	1.30	2.09	4	East 149th Street / 145th Street Bridge – Yankee Stadium	Northbound exit only; former NY 22/NY 100
The Bronx	Highbridge	2.44	3.93	5	East 161st Street / Macombs Dam Bridge – Yankee Stadium	
The Bronx	Highbridge	2.30	3.70	6	East 153rd Street / River Avenue – Yankee Stadium	Southbound exit and entrance
The Bronx	Morris Heights	3.40	5.47	7	I-95 / US 1 (Cross Bronx Expressway) – New Haven, Trenton	Signed as exits 7N (I-95 north) and 7S (I-95 south); exits 1C and 1D on I-95
The Bronx	University Heights	4.10	6.60	8	West 179th Street	Northbound exit and entrance
The Bronx	University Heights	4.76	7.66	9	West Fordham Road / University Heights Bridge	
The Bronx	Kingsbridge	5.92	9.53	10	West 230th Street	
The Bronx	Van Cortlandt Park	6.88	11.07	11	Van Cortlandt Park South	To Van Cortlandt Park
The Bronx	Van Cortlandt Park	7.21	11.60	12	To Henry Hudson Parkway south / Saw Mill River Parkway north	Access via Mosholu Parkway; northbound exit and southbound entrance
The Bronx	Van Cortlandt Park	7.55– 7.60	12.15– 12.23	13	East 233rd Street	
The Bronx	Van Cortlandt Park	7.55– 7.60	12.15– 12.23	Gas stations (northbound and southbound)		
The Bronx	Van Cortlandt Park	8.20	13.20	14	McLean Avenue	Northbound exit and southbound entrance
Bronx–Westchester county line	Van Cortlandt Park–Yonkers line	8.30 0.00	13.36 0.00	Transition between Major Deegan Expressway and New York State Thruway		
Westchester	Yonkers	0.48	0.77	1	Hall Place / McLean Avenue	No northbound access via McLean Avenue
Westchester	Yonkers	0.92	1.48	2	Yonkers Avenue – Raceway	Northbound exit and southbound entrance
Westchester	Yonkers	1.77	2.85	3	Mile Square Road	Northbound exit and southbound entrance
Westchester	Yonkers	2.18	3.51	4	Cross County Parkway to Mile Square Road	Cloverleaf interchange with Central Park Avenue; no southbound entrance; no northbound access via Mile Square Road
Westchester	Yonkers	2.70	4.35	5	NY 100 north (Central Park Avenue) – White Plains	Northbound exit and southbound entrance; southern terminus of NY 100
Westchester	Yonkers	4.00	6.44	6	Tuckahoe Road – Bronxville, Yonkers	Signed as exits 6E (Bronxville east) and 6W (Yorkers west) southbound
Westchester	Yonkers	5.14	8.27	6A	Ridge Hill Boulevard / Stew Leonard Drive	Last northbound exit before toll
Westchester	Yonkers	5.47	8.80	Yonkers Toll Gantry (E-ZPass or Toll by Mail)		
Westchester	Greenburgh	6.10	9.82	Ardsley Service Area (northbound)		
Westchester	Ardsley	7.58	12.20	7	NY 9A – Ardsley	Northbound exit and southbound entrance
Westchester	Greenburgh	10.33	16.62	7A	Saw Mill River Parkway to Taconic State Parkway north	Same-directional access only; no southbound entrance; exit 20 on Saw Mill Parkway; last southbound exit before toll
Westchester	Greenburgh	11.31– 11.80	18.20– 18.99	8	I-287 east / NY 119 / Saw Mill River Parkway north – White Plains, Rye	Signed as exits 8A (NY 119/Saw Mill) and 8 (I-287) southbound; southern end of I-287 concurrency; exit 22 on Saw Mill Parkway
Westchester	Tarrytown	12.65	20.36	9	To US 9 – Tarrytown, Sleepy Hollow	Northbound exit and entrance; access via NY 119
Westchester	Tarrytown	12.65	20.36	9	US 9 / NY 119 east – Tarrytown, Sleepy Hollow	Southbound exit and entrance; NY 119 not signed
Hudson River		12.80– 14.50	20.60– 23.34	Tappan Zee (Governor Mario M. Cuomo) Bridge (southbound toll; E-ZPass or Toll by Mail)		
Rockland	South Nyack	16.75	26.96	10	US 9W – Nyack, South Nyack	No southbound exit
Rockland	Nyack	17.63	28.37	11	US 9W / NY 59 west – Nyack	Northbound exit and entrance; access via High Avenue; NY 59 not signed
Rockland	Nyack	17.63	28.37	11	To US 9W – Nyack, South Nyack	Southbound exit and entrance; access via NY 59; last southbound exit before toll
Rockland	West Nyack	18.76	30.19	12	NY 303 / Palisades Center Drive – West Nyack	Palisades Center Drive not signed northbound
Rockland	West Nyack	20.94	33.70	13	Palisades Parkway – Bear Mountain, New Jersey	Signed as exits 13N (Bear Mountain north) and exit 13S (New Jersey south); exits 9E and 9W on Palisades Parkway
Rockland	Nanuet	22.80	36.69	14	NY 59 (CR 35A) – Spring Valley, Nanuet	
Rockland	Nanuet	23.00	37.01	–	CR 35 (Pascack Road) / Old Turnpike Road	Southbound entrance only
Rockland	Chestnut Ridge	23.53	37.87	14A	To G.S. Parkway south – New Jersey	Access via G.S. Parkway Connector
Rockland	Chestnut Ridge	24.31	39.12	Spring Valley Toll Gantry (E-ZPass or Toll by Mail; northbound trucks)		
Rockland	Montebello	27.62	44.45	14B	Airmont Road (CR 89) – Airmont, Montebello	Access to Good Samaritan Regional Medical Center
Rockland	Suffern	30.17	48.55	15	I-287 south / Route 17 south – New Jersey NY 17 begins	Northern end of I-287 concurrency; southern end of NY 17 concurrency
Rockland	Hillburn	31.35	50.45	15A	NY 17 north / NY 59 east – Sloatsburg, Suffern	Northern end of NY 17 concurrency; western terminus of NY 59; last northbound exit before toll
Rockland	Ramapo	32.40	52.14	Tandem Trailer Area		
Rockland	Sloatsburg	33.20	53.43	Sloatsburg Service Area (northbound); Ramapo Service Area (southbound)		
Orange	Woodbury	45.00	72.42	16	Future I-86 west to US 6 / NY 17 – Harriman	Harriman Toll Gantry (E-ZPass or Toll by Mail)
Orange	Woodbury	45.00	72.42	Woodbury Toll Gantry (E-ZPass or Toll by Mail)		
Orange	Town of Newburgh	60.10	96.72	17	I-84 / NY 300 to NY 17K – Scranton, Newburgh	Exit 36A on I-84
Orange	Town of Newburgh	64.8– 65.9	104.3– 106.1	Plattekill Service Area (northbound); Modena Service Area (southbound)		
Ulster	Town of New Paltz	76.01	122.33	18	NY 299 – Mid-Hudson Bridge, New Paltz, Poughkeepsie	
Ulster	Ulster	91.37	147.05	19	NY 28 (I-587 east) – Kingston, Rhinecliff Bridge	
Ulster	Ulster	96.30	154.98	Ulster Service Area (southbound)		
Ulster	Town of Saugerties	101.25	162.95	20	NY 32 / NY 212 – Saugerties, Woodstock	Woodstock not signed northbound; NY 212 not signed
Ulster	Town of Saugerties	103.20	166.08	Malden Service Area (northbound)		
Greene	Town of Catskill	113.89	183.29	21	To NY 23 – Catskill, Cairo	Access via CR 23B
Greene	New Baltimore	124.53	200.41	21B	US 9W to NY 81 – Coxsackie, Ravena	
Greene	New Baltimore	127.30	204.87	New Baltimore Service Area / Capital Region Welcome Center		
Albany	Coeymans	133.60	215.01	21A	To I-90 / Mass Pike east – Boston	Access via Berkshire Connector
Albany	Bethlehem	134.93	217.15	22	NY 144 to NY 396 – Selkirk	
Albany	Bethlehem	139.80	224.99	Toll Gantry (E-ZPass or Toll by Mail)		
Albany	Albany	141.92	228.40	23	I-787 north / US 9W – Albany, Troy	Southern terminus of I-787; access to MVP Arena and Albany–Rensselaer station
Albany	Bethlehem	145.60	234.32	Toll Gantry (E-ZPass or Toll by Mail)		
Albany	Albany	148.15 0.00	238.42 0.00	24	I-90 Toll west / New York Thruway west – Buffalo	Northern end of Thruway concurrency; southern end of I-90 concurrency; exit number not signed southbound
Albany	Albany			1	I-90 east to US 20 (Western Avenue) – Albany, Boston	Access to US 20 via NY 910F; signed as exits 1S (US 20) & 1E (I-90); northern end of I-90 concurrency; last southbound exit before toll
Albany	Village of Colonie	1.32	2.12	2	NY 5 (Central Avenue) / Wolf Road – Albany, Schenectady	Signed as exits 2E (NY 5 east) and 2W (NY 5 west); Wolf Road not signed southbound
Albany	Town of Colonie	3.00	4.83	3	NY 155 west / CR 151 west / Albany Shaker Road – Albany International Airport	Opened November 2019; northbound entrance via exit 4; formerly planned for I-687
Albany	Town of Colonie	3.10	4.99	4	CR 153 (Wolf Road (NY 910B)) / CR 151 east (Albany Shaker Road)	Southbound entrance via exit 3
Albany	Town of Colonie	4.21	6.78	5	NY 155 east – Latham	
Albany	Town of Colonie	5.46	8.79	6	NY 7 west / NY 2 east – Schenectady, Watervliet	Southern end of NY 7 concurrency
Albany	Town of Colonie	6.01	9.67	7	NY 7 east / US 9 / NY 9R to I-787 south – Troy, Cohoes, Latham, Waterford, Albany	Northern end of NY 7 concurrency; US 9, NY 9R and I-787 not signed
Mohawk River		8.24	13.26	Thaddeus Kosciusko Bridge		
Saratoga	Halfmoon–Clifton Park line	10.25	16.50	8	Crescent Vischer Ferry Road (CR 92) – Vischer Ferry, Crescent	To Mohawk Towpath Scenic Byway
Saratoga	Halfmoon–Clifton Park line	11.56	18.60	8A	Grooms Road (CR 91) – Waterford	Waterford not signed northbound; exit opened in 1994
Saratoga	Clifton Park	13.10	21.08	9	NY 146 – Clifton Park, Halfmoon	Signed as exits 9E (NY 146 east) and 9W (NY 146 west) southbound
Saratoga	Clifton Park	14.20	22.85	Clifton Park Rest Area (northbound)		
Saratoga	Clifton Park	16.00	25.75	10	Ushers Road (NY 911T) – Ballston Lake, Jonesville	Ballston Lake not signed southbound
Saratoga	Round Lake	18.56	29.87	11	Round Lake Road (CR 80) – Burnt Hills, Round Lake	
Saratoga	Malta	20.86	33.57	12	NY 67 – Ballston Spa, Malta	
Saratoga	Malta	24.54	39.49	13	US 9 (Broadway) – Saratoga Lake, Ballston Spa, Saratoga Springs	Signed as exit 13S (US 9 south) and exit 13N (US 9 north); access to Saratoga County Airport
Saratoga	Saratoga Springs	28.56	45.96	14	NY 9P Truck south / NY 9P (Union Avenue) to NY 29 – Saratoga Springs, Schuylerville, Saratoga Lake	NY 29 not signed southbound
Saratoga	Saratoga Springs–Wilton line	30.35	48.84	15	NY 9P Truck north / NY 29 Truck / NY 50 to NY 29 – Saratoga Springs, Gansevoort, Schuylerville	NY 29 not signed northbound; access to Saratoga Hospital
Saratoga	Wilton	35.86	57.71	16	Ballard Road (CR 33) – Wilton, Corinth, Gansevoort	
Saratoga	Moreau	40.64	65.40	17	US 9 (Saratoga Road) – South Glens Falls, Moreau Lake State Park	Former cloverleaf signed as exits 17N (US 9 north) and 17S (US 9 south); converted to parclo A2 interchange
Hudson River		42.73	68.77	Bridge		
Warren	Queensbury	43.70	70.33	Glens Falls Rest Area / Adirondacks Welcome Center		
Warren	Queensbury	45.17	72.69	18	Corinth Road/Main Street (CR 28) – Glens Falls, Corinth	Access to Glens Falls Hospital
Warren	Queensbury	47.52	76.48	19	NY 254 – Glens Falls, Hudson Falls	Hudson Falls not signed northbound; access to Floyd Bennett Memorial Airport
Warren	Queensbury	49.80	80.15	20	US 9 / NY 149 east – Fort Ann, Whitehall	Western terminus of NY 149; US 9 not signed
Warren	Queensbury–Lake George town line	51.23	82.45	Southern boundary of Adirondack Park		
Warren	Town of Lake George	52.98	85.26	21	NY 9N – Lake Luzerne, Lake George	Lake George Village not signed southbound
Warren	Village of Lake George	55.02	88.55	22	To US 9 / NY 9N – Lake George, Diamond Point, Bolton Landing	Access via NY 912Q; Diamond Point not signed southbound
Warren	Town of Lake George	59.45	95.68	23	CR 35 / US 9 to NY 28 – Warrensburg, Diamond Point	
Warren	Town of Warrensburg	67.85	109.19	24	CR 10 / CR 11 – Bolton Landing	
Warren	Chester	73.22	117.84	25	NY 8 – Chestertown, Hague	
Warren	Chester	78.00– 78.59	125.53– 126.48	26	US 9 – Pottersville, Minerva	
Essex	Schroon	81.99	131.95	27	US 9 – Schroon Lake	Northbound exit and southbound entrance
Essex	Schroon	88.70	142.75	28	NY 74 east – Ticonderoga, Crown Point	Access to Fort Ticonderoga and Ticonderoga, New York–Larrabees Point, Vermont ferry
Essex	North Hudson	94.63	152.29	29	Blue Ridge Road (CR 84) – Newcomb, North Hudson	
Essex	North Hudson	99.50	160.13	High Peaks Rest Area		
Essex	North Hudson	104.46	168.11	30	US 9 to NY 73 – Keene Valley, Keene, North Hudson	
Essex	Westport	117.58	189.23	31	NY 9N – Elizabethtown, Westport	Access to Essex, New York–Charlotte, Vermont ferry
Essex	Lewis	122.90	197.79	Lewis Rest Area		
Essex	Lewis	123.48	198.72	32	Stowersville Road (CR 12) – Lewis, Willsboro	Willsboro not signed southbound
Essex	Chesterfield	134.98	217.23	33	US 9 / NY 22 – Keeseville, Willsboro, Essex	Access to Essex, New York–Charlotte, Vermont ferry
Ausable River		138.34	222.64	Bridge		
Clinton	Au Sable	138.74	223.28	34	NY 9N – Au Sable Forks, Keeseville	
Clinton	Au Sable–Peru town line	142.41	229.19	Northern boundary of Adirondack Park		
Clinton	Peru	144.51	232.57	35	NY 442 (Bear Swamp Road) – Peru, Valcour, Port Kent	
Clinton	Peru	146.60	235.93	Valcour Rest Area (northbound)		
Clinton	Town of Plattsburgh	150.10	241.56	36	NY 22 – Plattsburgh International Airport	
Clinton	Town of Plattsburgh	153.06	246.33	37	NY 3 – Plattsburgh, Saranac Lake	Saranac Lake not signed southbound; access to Champlain Valley Physicians Hospital
Clinton	Town of Plattsburgh	154.87	249.24	38	NY 22 / NY 374 – Plattsburgh, Dannemora, Saranac Lake	Signed as exits 38S (NY 22 south) & 38N (NY 22 north)
Clinton	Town of Plattsburgh	156.36	251.64	39E	NY 314 east – Cumberland Head, Plattsburgh Bay	Signed as exit 39 northbound; access to Cumberland Head, New York–Grand Isle, Vermont ferry
Clinton	Town of Plattsburgh	156.36	251.64	39N	Moffitt Road	Southbound exit only
Clinton	Beekmantown	160.18	257.78	40	CR 58 – Beekmantown, Point au Roche	Former NY 456
Clinton	Beekmantown	162.10	260.87	Point au Roche-Beekmantown Rest Area / Gateway Information Center		
Clinton	Chazy	167.77	270.00	41	CR 23 – Chazy, Sciota	Former NY 191
Clinton	Town of Champlain	174.21	280.36	42	US 11 – Mooers, Rouses Point	
Clinton	Town of Champlain	175.53	282.49	43	US 9 south – Champlain	Northern terminus of US 9; last exit in the United States
Clinton	Town of Champlain	176.16	283.50	—	A-15 north – Montreal	Continuation into Quebec
1.000 mi = 1.609 km; 1.000 km = 0.621 mi: Concurrency terminus; Electronic toll collection; Incomplete access; Route transition

=== Northway Stub (Fuller Road Alternate) ===
The entire route is in Albany County.

Location	mi	km	Exit	Destinations	Notes
Guilderland	0.00	0.00	–	US 20 (Western Avenue)	Southern terminus; at-grade intersection
Guilderland	0.3	0.48	–	Crossgates Mall Road	Southbound exit and northbound entrance
Albany			1E-W	I-87 south / I-90 to New York Thruway – Albany, Boston, New York, Buffalo	Northbound exit and southbound entrance; signed as exits 1E (I-90 east) and 1W (I-87 south/I-90 west); exit 1S on I-90
Albany	0.9	1.4	–	I-87 north – Saratoga Springs, Glens Falls, Montreal	Northern terminus
1.000 mi = 1.609 km; 1.000 km = 0.621 mi: Incomplete access

=== Lake George Spur ===
The entire route is in Warren County. All exits are unnumbered.

Location	mi	km	Destinations	Notes
Town of Lake George	0.0	0.0	I-87 – Albany, Montreal	Western terminus; exit 22 on I-87
Village of Lake George			US 9 to NY 9N south – Lake George Village	Eastbound exit and westbound entrance
Town of Lake George			NY 9N – Diamond Point, Bolton Landing, Lake George Village	Eastern terminus; at-grade intersection
1.000 mi = 1.609 km; 1.000 km = 0.621 mi: Incomplete access

== Auxiliary routes ==
The road has three current spur routes, all located along the Thruway portion of I-87. I-287 serves as a 99-mile (159 km) bypass around New York City, beginning at the New Jersey Turnpike in Middlesex County, New Jersey, and ending at I-95 (the New England Thruway) near the Connecticut border in Rye. I-287 and I-87 overlap for 19 miles (31 km) across Westchester and Rockland counties. East of the concurrency, I-287 is known as the Cross Westchester Expressway (it was originally designated as I-187 and I-487). The other two spurs, the two-mile (3.2 km) I-587 and the 10-mile (16 km) I-787, link I-87 to the cities of Kingston and Albany, respectively.

Two other spurs of I-87 were planned but never constructed, with no plans to sign them in the near future. In the Hudson Valley, I-487 would have run along the Hudson River from I-87 and I-287 in Tarrytown to I-84 east of Beacon. The other spur, I-687, would have connected I-90 in Albany to I-87 near Albany International Airport in Colonie. Both routes were canceled in the 1970s as a result of public opposition. Part of what would have been I-487 is now the Croton Expressway, which is part of US 9, and part of what would have been I-687 is now the Albany Airport Connector, which provides direct access between the Northway (I-87) and Albany International Airport.
