= Shuart-Van Orden Stone House =

- U.S. National Register of Historic Places
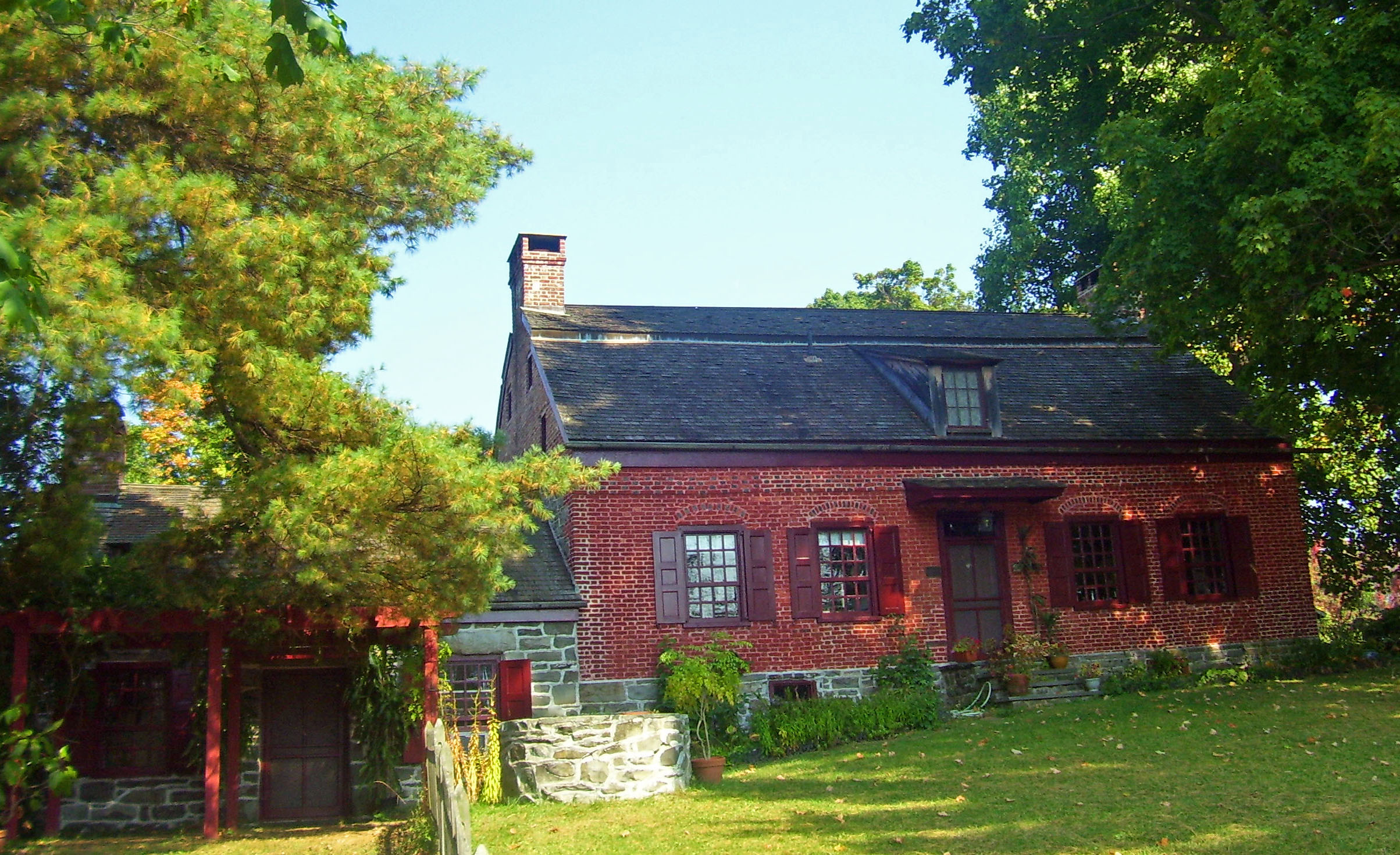
- House in 2007, with brick section visible
- Location: Town of Plattekill, New York
- Nearest city: Poughkeepsie
- Coordinates: 41°40′48″N 74°05′34″W
- Area: 4.2 acres (1.7 ha)
- Built: c. 1773
- NRHP reference No.: 95001335
- Added to NRHP: November 22, 1995

The Shuart-Van Orden Stone House is located on Allhusen Road in Plattekill, New York, United States, near the Thaddeus Hait Farm. The original stone house was built in 1740. It was added to the National Register of Historic Places in 1995, as a highly stylized version of a typical Hudson Valley Dutch Colonial house, the use of brick and gambrel roof in its construction reflecting the influence of migrants from New Jersey and New York City, where that was more common.

== House and grounds ==
The 1 1/2-story house has a five-bay the front constructed of brick from clay deposits on the site. A veranda with bell-shaped profile is found on the rear. It was extensively renovated in the 1980s to restore its original historical appearance and shore up the deteriorating east and west walls. During this time, a stone wing was added to the west, built from a stone house in nearby Modena. It houses the furnace and other modern mechanicals, leaving the cellar in its unique and original form.

The rebuilding of the east wall found an old archway, possibly added later, in the 19th century. Its doorway was covered over with stone sometime in the 19th century. The interior is divided into four chambers, with a center hall that features much of the original red paint and wainscoting. The handrail on the staircase is of a molding and shape very similar to that found at the nearby Locust Lawn Estate and its accompanying Terwilliger House.

There are four other buildings on the property, most dating from the early 19th century which includes an 18th-century Dutch barn that was relocated from Kingston, New York. A granary that dates to roughly 1800 is the only one considered a contributing property.

== History ==
It is one of the oldest houses in the town, although it has been added onto and rebuilt a great deal since its original construction. Johannis Shuart, an early settler from New Jersey, acquired 500 acres (2.0 km^{2}) from one of the original patentees in 1772, and may well have been living there earlier. He sold the house and land to Peter Van Orden in 1799.

Van Orden opened up a store on the property opposite the house, where he also operated a distillery, a common practice at the time for that region. In 1886 it became the property of some heirs of his named Hasbrouck, who in turn sold it to George Rhinehart in 1928. His family owned it until 1980, continuing its agricultural uses, until selling it to Brian and Marilyn McKay, its present owners, who renovated it extensively and discovered some previously hidden aspects of the house.
