= Clintondale, New York =

- CDP
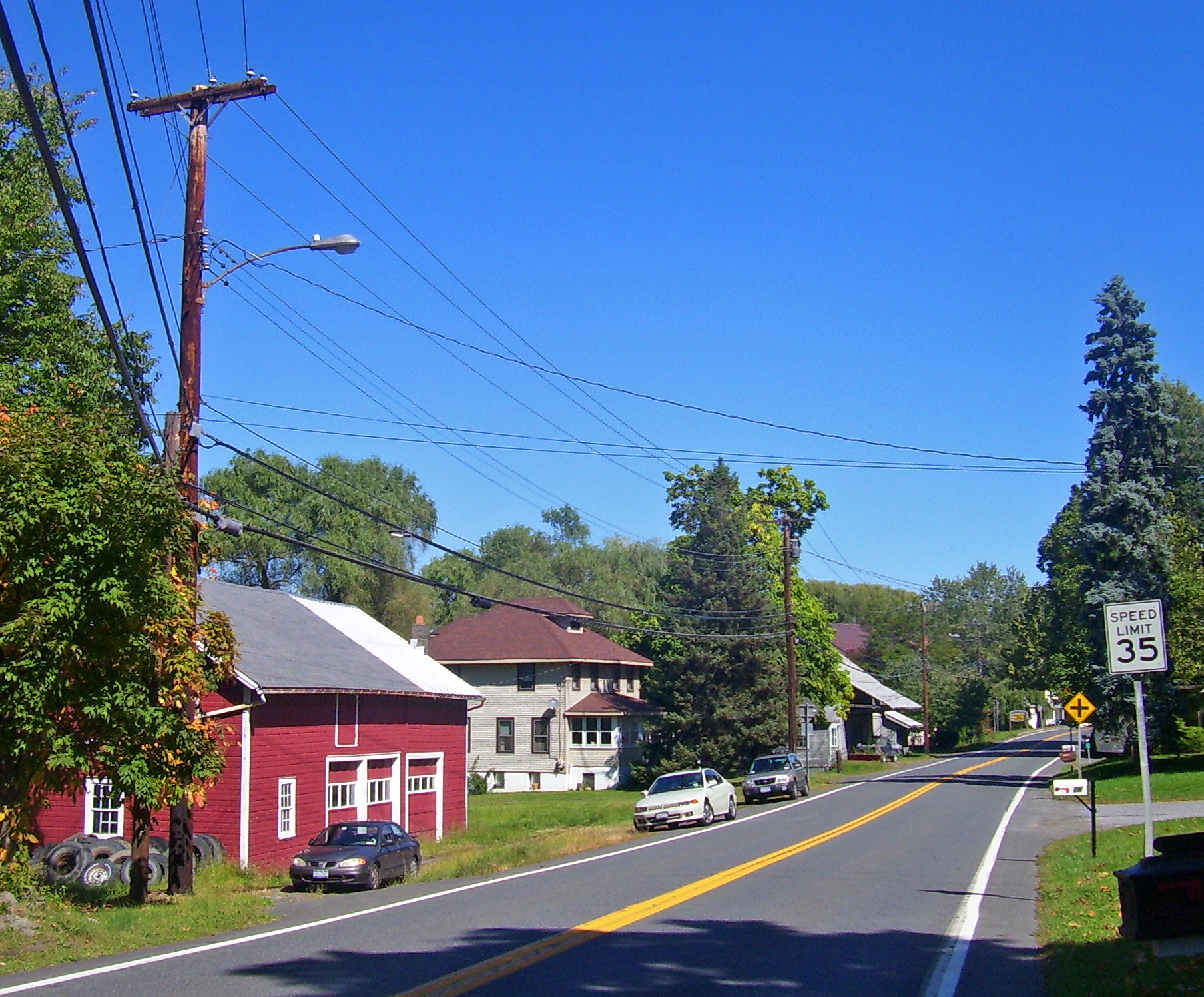
- Clintondale looking east along Routes 44/55, 2007

- Location in Ulster County and the state of New York.
- Coordinates: 41°41′40″N 74°2′48″W
- Country: United States
- State: New York
- County: Ulster

Area
  - Total: 6.47 sq mi (16.77 km^{2})
  - Land: 6.41 sq mi (16.59 km^{2})
  - Water: 0.069 sq mi (0.18 km^{2})
- Elevation: 545 ft (166 m)

Population (2020)
  - Total: 1,938
  - Density: 302.6/sq mi (116.83/km^{2})
- Time zone: UTC-5 (EST)
  - Summer (DST): UTC-4 (EDT)
- ZIP code: 12515
- Area code: 845
- FIPS code: 36-16452
- GNIS feature ID: 0946900

Clintondale is a hamlet (and census-designated place) in Ulster County, New York, United States. The population was 1,938 at the 2020 census.

Clintondale is located at the northern town line of the Town of Plattekill. The community is on US Route 44 and NY 55 at the junction of County Route 22.

== History ==
The community was founded in 1750.

== Geography ==
Clintondale is located at 41°41′40″N 74°2′48″W (41.694548, -74.046639).

According to the United States Census Bureau, the CDP has a total area of 5.6 square miles (15 km^{2}), of which 5.6 square miles (15 km^{2}) is land and 0.18% is water.

== Demographics ==
Historical population
Census	Pop.	Note	%±
2000	1,424		—
2010	1,452		2.0%
2020	1,938		33.5%
U.S. Decennial Census

As of the census of 2000, there were 1,424 people, 542 households, and 346 families residing in the CDP. The population density was 254.7 inhabitants per square mile (98.3/km^{2}). There were 586 housing units at an average density of 104.8 per square mile (40.5/km^{2}). The racial makeup of the CDP was 89.96% White, 4.35% African American, 0.49% Native American, 0.84% Asian, 0.07% Pacific Islander, 0.35% from other races, and 3.93% from two or more races. Hispanic or Latino of any race were 3.65% of the population.

There were 542 households, out of which 34.1% had children under the age of 18 living with them, 50.9% were married couples living together, 8.7% had a female householder with no husband present, and 36.0% were non-families. 27.7% of all households were made up of individuals, and 6.3% had someone living alone who was 65 years of age or older. The average household size was 2.59 and the average family size was 3.21.

In the CDP, the population was spread out, with 26.5% under the age of 18, 8.7% from 18 to 24, 30.4% from 25 to 44, 24.6% from 45 to 64, and 9.7% who were 65 years of age or older. The median age was 36 years. For every 100 females, there were 94.3 males. For every 100 females age 18 and over, there were 96.6 males.

The median income for a household in the CDP was $34,737, and the median income for a family was $55,074. Males had a median income of $33,405 versus $26,023 for females. The per capita income for the CDP was $18,410. About 5.7% of families and 12.4% of the population were below the poverty line, including 15.5% of those under age 18 and 4.5% of those age 65 or over.

== Education ==
The CDP is mostly in Highland Central School District, with a portion in Marlboro Central School District.
