= Cole–Hasbrouck Farm Historic District =

Historic district in New York, United States

- U.S. National Register of Historic Places
- U.S. Historic district
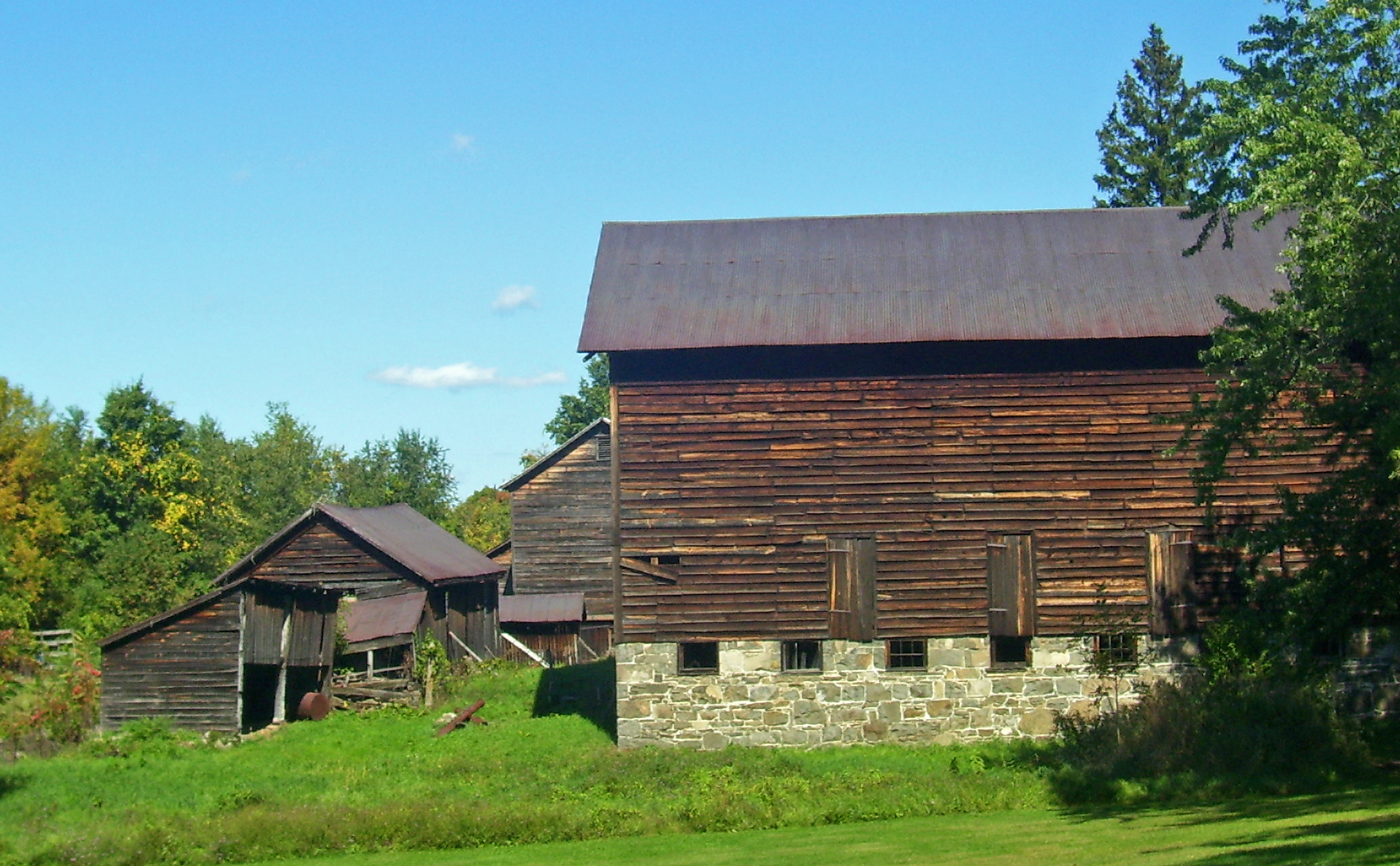
- Farm buildings from Modena fire department garage, 2007

- Location within New York Location within the United States
- Location: NY 32, N of the jct. with US 44 and NY 55, Modena, NY
- Nearest city: Poughkeepsie
- Coordinates: 41°40′08″N 74°06′24″W
- Area: 68.2 acres (27.6 ha)
- Architectural style: Early Republic
- NRHP reference No.: 94001240
- Added to NRHP: November 10, 1994

The Cole–Hasbrouck Farm Historic District is a historic home and farm and national historic district. It is located along NY 32 north of the junction with US 44 and NY 55, in Modena, Ulster County, New York, US. The district encompasses 21 contributing buildings, 4 contributing sites, and 5 contributing structures on a farm established in the 1820s. The main house was built about 1820, and is a two-story, five-bay, brick-and-stone dwelling with a side-gable roof. It has a two-story rear frame ell that subsumes an earlier 1 1/2-story kitchen ell. Other contributing resources are related to the house landscape and dependencies, the farm complex, and a hamlet that grew in the 1850s at the crossroads.

It was added to the National Register of Historic Places in 1994.
