= Thaddeus Hait Farm =

- U.S. National Register of Historic Places
- U.S. Historic district
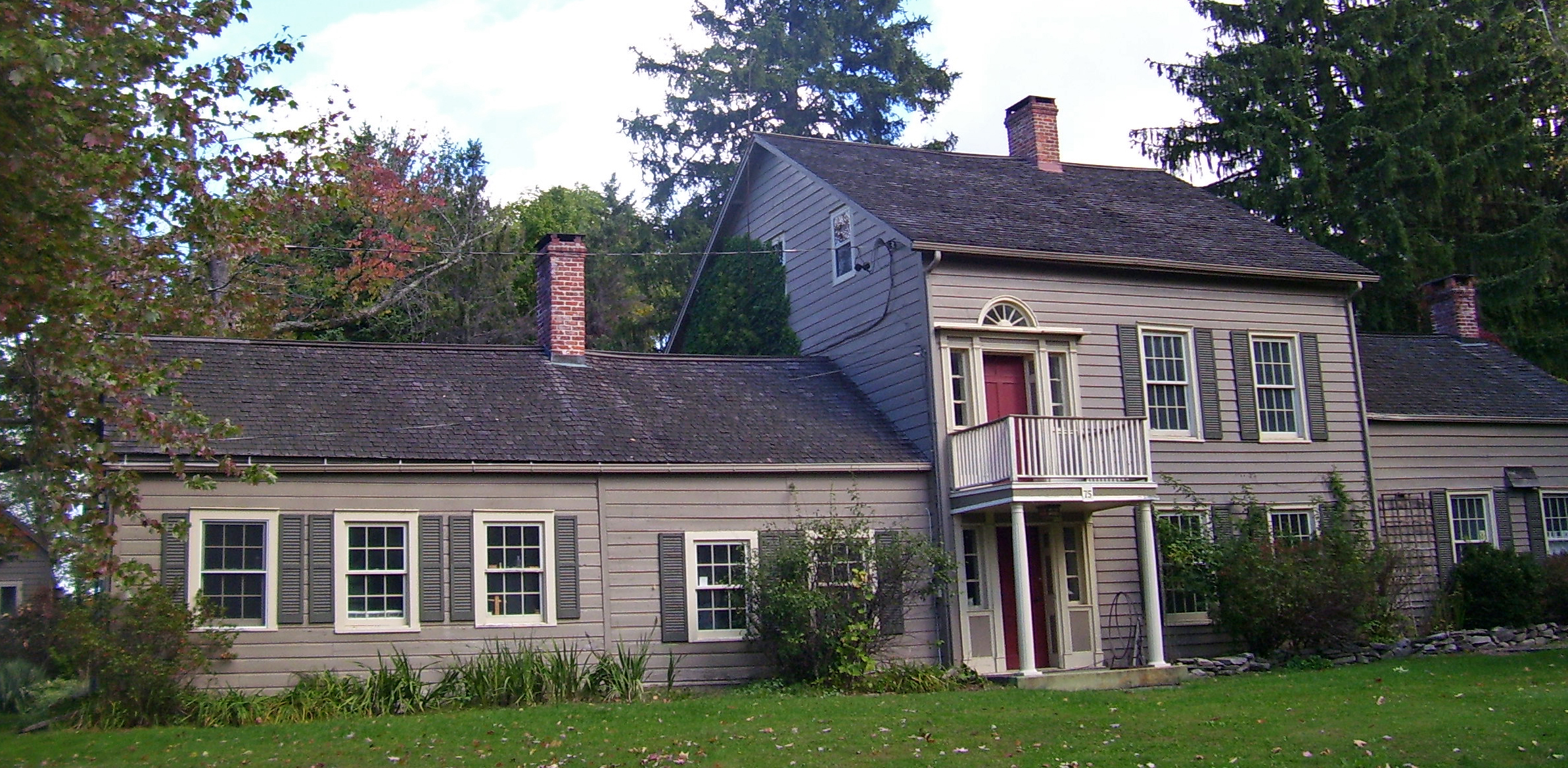
- Main house in 2007

- Location within New York Location within the United States
- Location: Modena, NY
- Nearest city: Poughkeepsie
- Coordinates: 41°40′45″N 74°05′29″W
- Area: 142 acres (0.57 km^{2})
- Built: late 18th-early 20th centuries
- Architectural style: Dutch Colonial, Federal
- NRHP reference No.: 88003075
- Added to NRHP: December 29, 1988

The Thaddeus Hait Farm is located on Allhusen Road near the hamlet of Modena in the town of Plattekill, New York, United States. It is a 142-acre (0.57 km^{2}) property on both sides of the road consisting of 15 contributing properties in two distinct groups, together comprising a mostly intact early 19th-century family farm still used for that purpose today.

Hait, a member of a prosperous Westchester County family, bought the original 97 acres (39 ha) in 1819. At the time the road was the busy Milton Turnpike, carrying much traffic from distilleries. Over the next nine years, he built the farm up with purchases adding 35 acres (140,000 m^{2}), setting it into its present form. His grandson sold it in 1888. Two other owners later, in 1906, the Allhusen family after whom the road was renamed bought it for dairy farming and kept it until 1973. After some more transitional owners, it came to the Adairs, who returned to the property's roots by going into winemaking. The farm was added to the National Register of Historic Places in 1988. They have since sold the property to Marc and Lori Stopkie, who have retained the Adair name. Today, Adair Vineyards produces 20,000 bottles annually of Seyval blanc, Vignoles, Foch and Millot, on 100 acres (40 ha). Their tasting facility is on the south side of the road east of the house.

The main house, on the road a short distance from the Shuart-Van Orden Stone House, is a Federal style home built around 1825 from a mix of wood and stone, an unusual combination in that style. A frame extension of the west wing was added in the late 19th century. Originally the front was sided in clapboard with a cornice and frieze; that was replaced with cedar in the 1950s. The interior retains much of the original molding. Near the house are ancillary agricultural structures, such as a stone barn (an unusual material for the area) that appears to have built around the same time as the house, a later wood barn of an identical configuration as the first.

The other group, south of the road, is centered on a New World Dutch barn, older than the main house. Originally constructed, like other Dutch barns, for wheat farming, it was adapted for winemaking around 1986. Its outbuildings include a smokehouse, icehouse and 1873 granary. An outhouse dates to the early 20th century. There is also the remains of a foundation of a late 18th or early 19th-century stone house and a well that served it.
