= Plattekill, New York =

Coordinates: 41°36′59.75″N 74°4′33.92″W

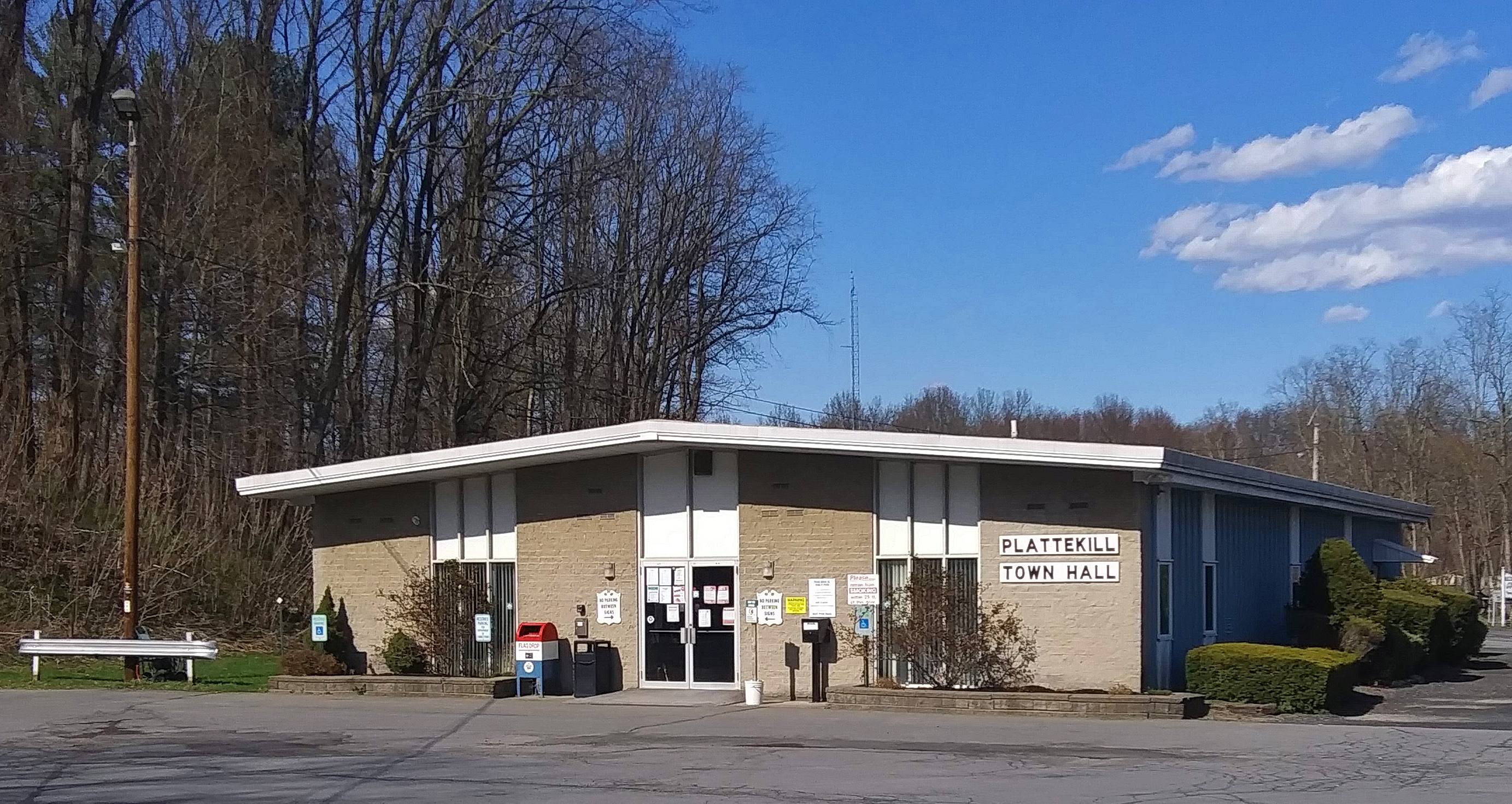
- Town hall

- Location in Ulster County and the state of New York.
- Country: United States
- State: New York
- County: Ulster

Area
  - Total: 35.74 sq mi (92.56 km^{2})
  - Land: 35.11 sq mi (90.94 km^{2})
  - Water: 0.63 sq mi (1.63 km^{2})

Population (2020)
  - Total: 10,424
  - Density: 296.9/sq mi (114.6/km^{2})
- FIPS code: 36-111-58552
- Website: Town website

Plattekill /ˈplætəkɪl/ is a town in Ulster County, New York, United States. The population was 10,424 in 2020, a slight decrease from 10,499 at the 2010 census. The name is derived from a stream, the Platte Kill.

The town of Plattekill is in the southeastern part of the county, immediately north of the town of Newburgh in neighboring Orange County.

There are five hamlets in the town: Ardonia, Clintondale, Modena, New Hurley, and Plattekill.

== History ==
The area was settled by European settlers early in the 18th century, and the town was established in 1800 from part of the town of Marlborough.

The Reformed Dutch Church of New Hurley was built in the 1830s, and listed on the National Register of Historic Places in 1982. The Shuart-Van Orden Stone House was built in 1740 and listed on the National Register of Historic Places in 1995.

== Geography ==
According to the United States Census Bureau, the town has a total area of 35.7 square miles (92.5 km^{2}), of which 35.6 square miles (92.2 km^{2}) is land and 0.1 square mile (0.2 km^{2}) (0.22%) is water.

The southern town line is the border of Orange County, dividing Plattekill from Newburgh. To the west, Plattekill borders Shawangunk and Gardiner, while in the north the town is bordered by Lloyd. The eastern boundary of the town closely parallels the Marlboro Mountain ridge, dividing Plattekill from the town of Marlborough.

The New York State Thruway (Interstate 87), US 44 (concurrent with NY 55) and NY 32 pass through the town.

== Demographics ==
Historical population
Census	Pop.	Note	%±
1820	2,139		—
1830	2,044		−4.4%
1840	2,125		4.0%
1850	1,998		−6.0%
1860	1,918		−4.0%
1870	2,031		5.9%
1880	2,205		8.6%
1890	2,038		−7.6%
1900	1,866		−8.4%
1910	1,879		0.7%
1920	1,798		−4.3%
1930	1,713		−4.7%
1940	2,082		21.5%
1950	2,215		6.4%
1960	3,009		35.8%
1970	4,458		48.2%
1980	7,409		66.2%
1990	8,891		20.0%
2000	9,892		11.3%
2010	10,499		6.1%
2020	10,424		−0.7%
U.S. Decennial Census 2020

As of the census of 2000, there were 9,892 people, 3,649 households, and 2,561 families living in the town. The population density was 277.8 people per square mile (107.3 people/km^{2}). There were 3,888 housing units at an average density of 109.2 per square mile (42.2/km^{2}). The racial makeup of the town was 86.91% white, 4.62% black or African American, .31% Native American, .63% Asian, .03% Pacific Islander, 5.06% from other races, and 2.44% from two or more races. Hispanic or Latino of any race were 16% of the population.

There were 3,649 households, out of which 35.6% had children under the age of 18 living with them, 53.6% were married couples living together, 11.6% had a female householder with no husband present, and 29.8% were non-families. 23.7% of all households were made up of individuals, and 8% had someone living alone who was 65 years of age or older. The average household size was 2.7, and the average family size was 3.19.

In the town, the population was spread out, with 27.6% under the age of 18, 7.4% from 18 to 24, 30.8% from 25 to 44, 22.9% from 45 to 64, and 11.5% who were 65 years of age or older. The median age was 36 years. For every 100 females, there were 97.9 males. For every 100 females age 18 and over, there were 94.5 males.

The median income for a household in the town was $40,448, and the median income for a family was $47,684. Males had a median income of $36,675 versus $29,449 for females. The per capita income for the town was $18,651. About 6.3% of families and 9.6% of the population were below the poverty line, including 13% of those under age 18 and 7.3% of those age 65 or over.

== Communities and locations in Plattekill ==
- Ardonia – a hamlet in the northern part of the town on Routes US 44/NY 55 just east of the New York State Thruway.
- Camp Sunset – a location south of Ardonia.
- Clintondale – a hamlet in the northeastern part of the town on Routes US 44/NY 55 east of Ardonia
- Flint – a hamlet east of New Hurley.
- Modena – a hamlet at the junction of routes US 44/NY 55 and NY 32.
- Modena Gardens – a hamlet northeast of New Hurley.
- New Hurley– a hamlet southwest of Modena Gardens and west of Flint.
- Plattekill – the hamlet of Plattekill is in the southeastern part of the town, east of the Thruway on Route 32, just north of the Orange County line.
- Sylva – a hamlet west of Plattekill on Route 32.
- Tuckers Corners – a location near the eastern town line.
