= Diamond Point, New York =

- Hamlet
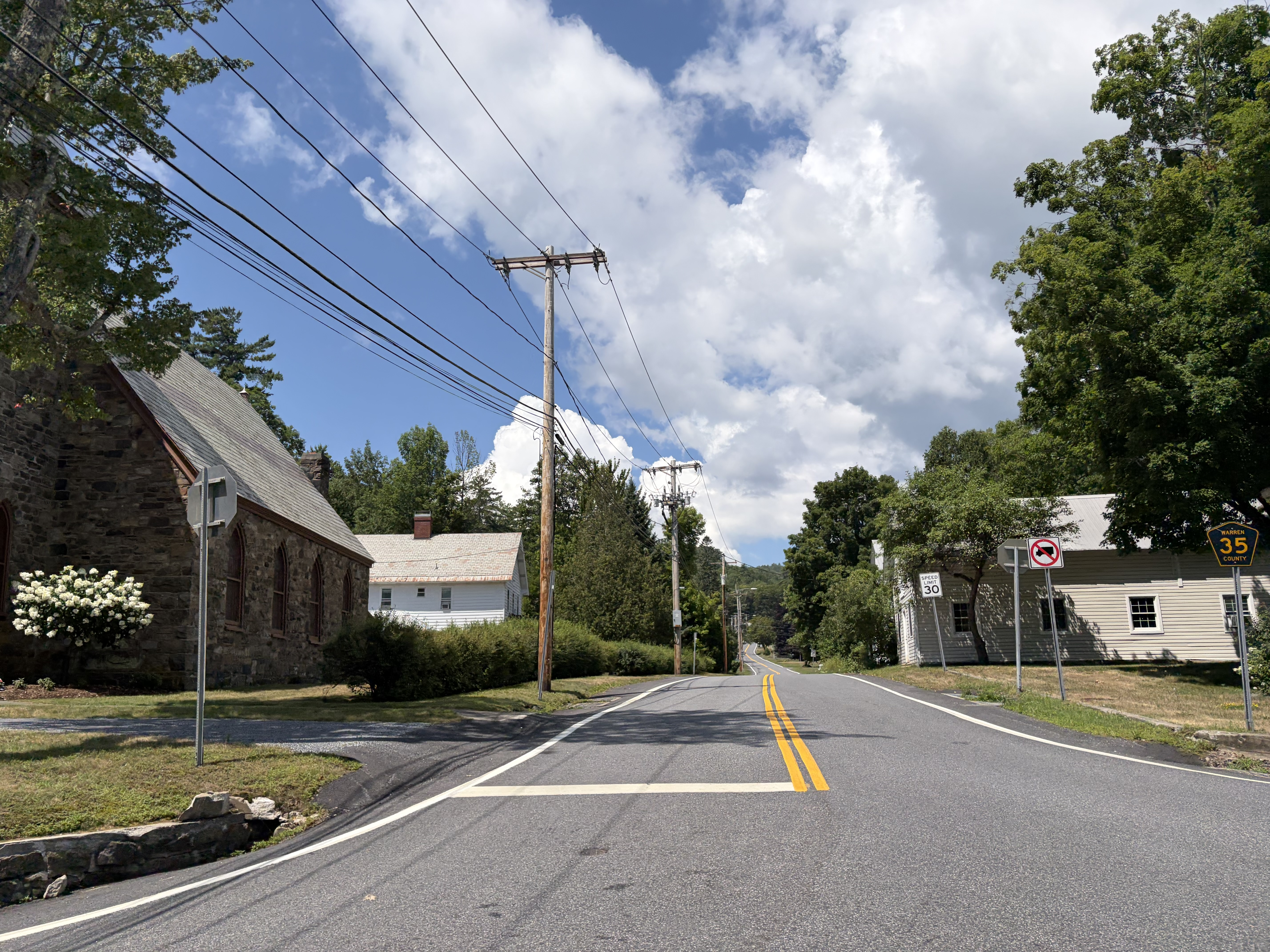
- The intersection of Diamond Point Road with New York State Route 9N in Diamond Point

- Location within New York Location within the United States
- Coordinates: 43°28′45″N 73°41′13″W
- Country: United States
- State: New York
- County: Warren
- Elevation: 331 ft (101 m)
- Time zone: UTC-5 (Eastern (EST))
  - Summer (DST): UTC-4 (EDT)
- ZIP code: 12824
- Area codes: 518 & 838
- GNIS feature ID: 948420

Diamond Point is a hamlet in Warren County, New York, United States. The community is located along the western shore of Lake George and New York State Route 9N, 3.9 miles (6.3 km) north-northeast of the village of Lake George. Diamond Point has a post office with ZIP code 12824, which opened on September 6, 1877.
