= Modena, New York =

Coordinates: 41°40′05″N 74°06′22″W

- hamlet
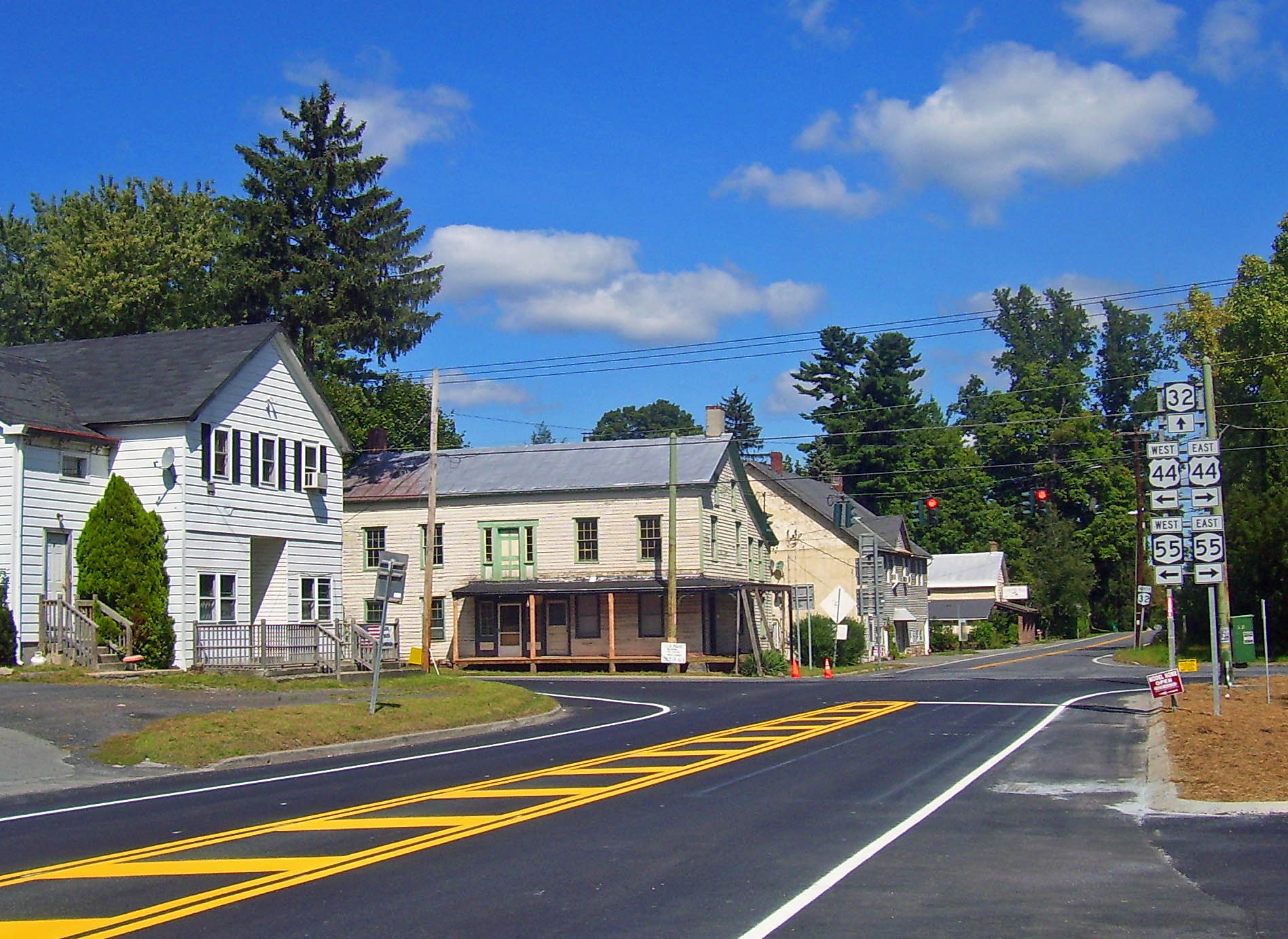
- Center of Modena at junction of routes 44/55 and 32.
- Interactive map of Modena, New York
- Country: United States
- State: New York
- County: Ulster County
- Time zone: UTC-5 (Eastern (EST))
  - Summer (DST): UTC-4 (EDT)
- ZIP code: 12548
- Area code: 845

Modena is a hamlet in Ulster County, New York, United States. It is located in the northwestern corner of the town of Plattekill, centered at the junction of the US 44/NY 55 concurrency and NY 32.

== History ==
The area was first settled in the late 17th century and was originally called "Clark's Corner". The name was changed to Modena in 1829, and the hamlet most likely was named for the Italian city of Modena.

The Cole-Hasbrouck Farm Historic District and Thaddeus Hait Farm are listed on the National Register of Historic Places.

== Present day ==
Modena has long been a primarily rural community with minimal development, although that has been changing enough for Hannaford to build one of its supermarkets on Route 32 just south of the junction in 2007. Additional commercial development in the immediate area has included a Stewart's gas and convenience store, a renovated Citgo station, a Dollar General, and newly built Dunkin' Donuts in 2017.

== Notable person ==
- John C. Brodhead, U.S. Representative
- Capt. Joseph Limeburner, Ship Captain (Great Republic)
