= Saratoga Corinth and Hudson Railway =

Heritage railroad in the northern Hudson River region

Overview
- Headquarters: Corinth, New York
- Locale: Warren and Saratoga counties
- Dates of operation: 2022–present

Technical
- Track gauge: 1,435 mm (4 ft 8 1/2 in)

Other
- Website: Official website

The Saratoga Corinth and Hudson Railway is a heritage railroad located in the upper Hudson River region of the Adirondack Mountains in the U.S. state of New York. Headquartered in Corinth, New York, the railway operates excursion trains over a portion of the former Adirondack Branch.

== History ==
The Adirondack Company constructed the Adirondack branch between 1865 and 1871. The line began at Saratoga Springs, New York, and extended north to North Creek, New York. The Delaware and Hudson Railway gained control of the line in 1889 and formally merged the Adirondack Railway in 1902. Warren County, New York acquired the portion of the line within its borders in 1996, while the town of Corinth, New York acquired the southern end in 2006.

The first heritage railway to operate on the line was the Upper Hudson River Railroad, which ran excursions from 1998 to 2010. The Saratoga and North Creek Railway began service in 2011 and ceased operations in 2018. After several years without service, the Saratoga Corinth and Hudson Railway began running excursions over the southern portion of the line in 2022.

== Rolling stock ==
The rolling stock of the Saratoga Corinth and Hudson Railway includes three former Delaware and Hudson ALCO RS-3 diesel locomotives: Nos. 4103, 4118, and 4085. In August 2026, they acquired a EMD GP38-2 locomotive no. 7309, originally built for the Lehigh Valley Railroad as their no. 322, later going to the Delaware & Hudson as their no. 7309, then the Canadian Pacific, who kept its number from the Delaware & Hudson. In June of 2026, the railway had acquired Albany Port EMD SW9 no. 12, originally Pennsylvania Railroad 9122, with the locomotive arriving later in August.
