= Saratoga and North Creek Railway =

Former heritage railroad in Northern New York

Coordinates: 43.082790°N 73.810080°W

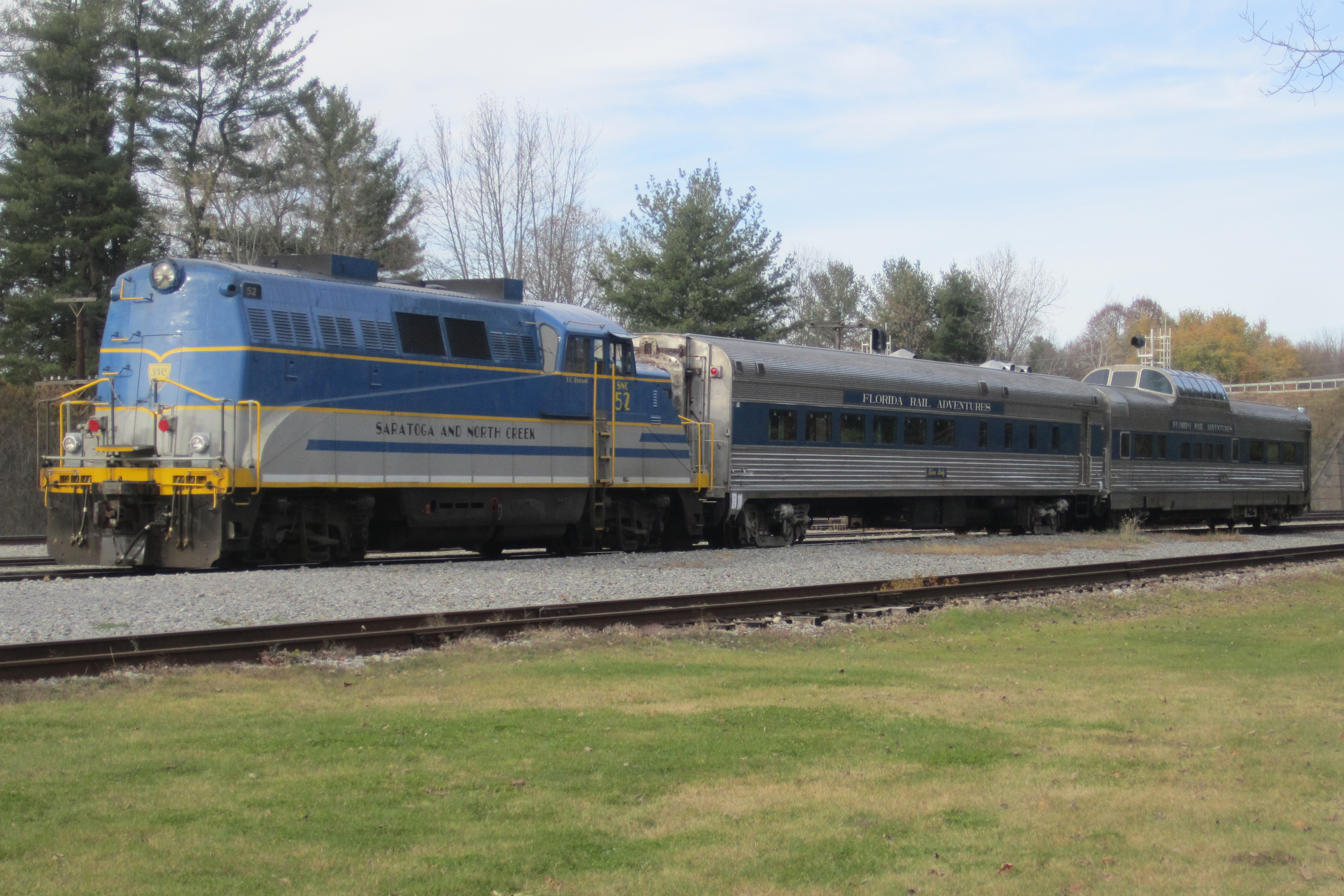
- Saratoga and North Creek train at the Saratoga Springs station
- Locale: Warren and Saratoga counties, New York, USA

Commercial operations
- Name: Adirondack branch
- Built by: Adirondack Railway
- Original gauge: 4 ft 8 1/2 in (1,435 mm)

Preserved operations
- Reporting mark: SNC
- Preserved gauge: 4 ft 8 1/2 in (1,435 mm)

Commercial history
- Opened: 1871
- 1889: D&H acquires the railroad
- Closed: 1989

Preservation history
- 1999: Upper Hudson River Railroad began operating
- 2010: Upper Hudson River Railroad closed
- 2011: Saratoga and North Creek Railway began operation
- 2018: Saratoga and North Creek Railway ceased operation
- Headquarters: Saratoga Springs, New York

The Saratoga and North Creek Railway was a heritage railway that began operation in July 2011. Passenger operations ceased on April 7, 2018, and the final revenue freight train to remove stored tank cars operated in May 2018. The railroad ran in the upper Hudson River region of the Adirondack Mountains, in the U.S. state of New York.

The railroad operated between North Creek and Saratoga Springs, New York, where it connected with Amtrak's Ethan Allen Express and Adirondack services.

== History ==
The Saratoga and North Creek Railway operated over former Adirondack Railway trackage built by Thomas C. Durant in 1871. Delaware and Hudson Railway acquired the Adirondack Line from William West Durant in 1889. North Creek station is where Theodore Roosevelt learned he was to become president of the United States of America after President William McKinley was assassinated in 1901. Passenger service was reduced to summer-only in 1950 and discontinued altogether in 1957.

In 1998, the line was purchased by Warren County with plans to operate an excursion train to improve tourism and economic development in the area. In 1999, the Upper Hudson River Railroad began operating excursion trains south from North Creek to Riverside Station in Riparius. The Upper Hudson River Railroad lost its contract with Warren County on December 31, 2010, ending 11 years of operation.

In 2002, the Branch line that connected to the paper mill in Corinth, New York went out of service after the mill's closure and has not operated since then.

On April 8, 2011, it was announced that Iowa Pacific Holdings (IPH) would take over operation of the route effective July 1, 2011. As part of the agreement, IPH agreed to operate a minimum of 182 tourist-oriented passenger trains over the line.

With the creation of the Saratoga and North Creek Railway, regularly scheduled service returned to the line for the first time since the D&H ceased freight operations on November 17, 1989. IPH began operating trains on July 14, 2011, as the Saratoga and North Creek Railroad. Unlike the Upper Hudson River Railroad, the Saratoga and North Creek operated over the entire 57 miles (92 km) between Saratoga Springs, New York and North Creek.

On May 14, 2012, IPH received permission from the Surface Transportation Board to restore freight service on the derelict north end of the line as far as Newcomb. Freight service began on the line in February 2013.

On August 2, 2013, the rear locomotive of an SNCRR train derailed in Thurman. No injuries were reported, but the railroad was closed temporarily to allow for repairs.

On April 3, 2018, plans were announced to shut down the railway line due to financial losses. The final tourist train ran on April 7. The organization Protect the Adirondacks has called for the conversion of the railway line into a rail trail. Four bids for purchasing the line for passenger and freight service were placed in 2019. It was replaced by Saratoga Corinth and Hudson Railway beginning in 2022.

== Passenger service ==
Regularly scheduled service ran once each day Friday through Monday from July 1 to October 31 and on Saturdays and Sundays during the fall and spring. The trip took 2 hours and 12 minutes.

A separate service, the Snow Train, ran on Fridays, Saturdays, and Sundays during the winter. Unlike the summer trains, the Snow Train had two trains each day in both directions.

The North End Local was a shorter route between Thurman and North Creek twice a day on Fridays, Saturdays, and Sundays in July and August. All other trains ran the full length of the line between Saratoga Springs and North Creek.

== Railbike tours ==
In 2016, plans were floated for 3-hour pedal-powered railbike tours on a 10-mile section of unused railroad tracks between Moose Pond Club Road and North Creek.

The tours opened in July 2017 using two and four-person pedal-powered railbikes. Starting from the North Creek rail depot, tourists are driven to North River, where they pedal north for three miles along a fairly flat route which includes crossing the Hudson River on a trestle before returning on the same route.

The trip takes about two hours each way. The tours are operated by Revolution Rail, which pays the railway to use the line.
