= Black Pond (disambiguation) =

Black Pond is a 2011 British film.

Black Pond may also refer to:

- Black Pond (New York), a lake near Corinth, New York
- Black Pond Township, Oregon County, Missouri
- Black Pond Wildlife Management Area, on Lake Ontario, New York
