= Upper Hudson River Valley =

Coordinates: 43°29′9″N 73°48′33″W

The northern portion of the Hudson River valley in Upstate New York, generally that region extending from the first town below the headwaters of the Hudson River at North River to the last substantive waterfall preventing the passage of vessels at Fort Edward.

Downstream from Fort Edward, northbound boat traffic exits the Hudson River onto the Champlain Canal.

The largest population center in the Upper Hudson River Valley is that of Glens Falls. Other towns include North Creek, Hadley, Lake Luzerne, Corinth, and Hudson Falls. The region is characterized by a series of small glens and valleys surrounded by the Adirondack Mountains on all sides. At Corinth the river deepens and widens as it approaches the "big bend" where Interstate 87 crosses near Glens Falls.

North and west of this region are the Adirondacks, east are Lake George and Vermont, and south is Capital Region, New York.

In 2006, there was evidence of Polychlorinated biphenyl (PCB) pollution in the river valley.
