= Upper Hudson River Railroad =

Coordinates: 43°42′10″N 73°59′23″W

- Locale: Adirondack Mountains, Warren County, New York, USA

Commercial operations
- Name: Adirondack branch
- Built by: Adirondack Railway
- Original gauge: 4 ft 8 1/2 in (1,435 mm)

Preserved operations
- Reporting mark: UHRX
- Preserved gauge: 4 ft 8 1/2 in (1,435 mm)

Commercial history
- Opened: 1871
- 1889: D&H acquires the railroad
- Closed: 1989

Preservation history
- 1999: Opened
- 2010: Closed
- 2011: Saratoga and North Creek Railroad takes over
- Headquarters: North Creek, New York

The Upper Hudson River Railroad was a heritage railroad that operated from 1999 to 2010 in the upper Hudson River in New York State's Adirondack Mountains.

Primary motive power consisted of Southwind Rail Travel Limited ex-Delaware & Hudson locomotive No. 5019.

== History ==
The Upper Hudson River Railroad uses the Adirondack Railway line built by Thomas C. Durant in 1871 to North Creek. North Creek station is where Theodore Roosevelt learned he was to become president of the United States of America after President William McKinley was assassinated in 1901. Passenger service was reduced to summer-only in 1950 and discontinued altogether in 1957.

In 1998 the right of way was purchased by Warren County with plans to operate an excursion train to improve tourism and economic development in the area. In 1999, the Upper Hudson River Railroad was formed and introduced an excursion train that ran 8.5 miles (13.7 km) south from North Creek to Riverside Station in Riparius.

The track from Riverside Station 40 miles (64 km) south to Hadley was rebuilt by 2007. The Upper Hudson River Railroad celebrated its tenth year with a run, dubbed "40 Miler", that started at the 96-foot (29 m) high trestle in Hadley and ended at the restored 90-foot (27 m) turntable in North Creek. The 2007 season included excursions to 1,000 acres (400 ha) Ranch, the 40 miler to Hadley, and a Payroll Robbery. Various actors playing the roles of clowns, hobos, and a musician/storyteller join the excursions.

=== End of operations ===
The Upper Hudson River Railroad lost their contract with Warren County on December 31, 2010. On April 8, 2011, it was announced that Iowa Pacific Holdings would take over operation of the route effective July 1, 2011. As part of the agreement, the Iowa Pacific agreed to operate a minimum of 182 tourist-oriented passenger trains over the line. Iowa Pacific began operating trains on July 12, 2011, as the Saratoga and North Creek Railroad. Unlike the Upper Hudson River Railroad, the Saratoga and North Creek operates over the entire 57-mile (92 km) distance between the Upper Hudson River Railroad's former terminal in North Creek and the station in Saratoga Springs, which allows connections with Amtrak's Adirondack and Ethan Allen Express services.

An article dated May 14, 2012 in the Post Star titled Federal board OKs rail freight line between North Creek and Newcomb stated, "The operator of the Saratoga & North Creek Railway can move forward with plans to reopen the Tahawus rail line between North Creek and Newcomb and offer freight service, U.S. Sen. Charles Schumer, D-N.Y., announced Monday. The federal Surface Transportation Board on Monday approved a request for 'common carrier' status on the line, which allows Iowa Pacific Holdings, the rail line operator, to reopen the line." This action will result in freight traffic running over the former UHRR line.

== Stations ==
- North Creek – North Creek, New York
- Riverside Station – Riparius, New York (NRHP)
