= Riverside station (New York) =

Riverside
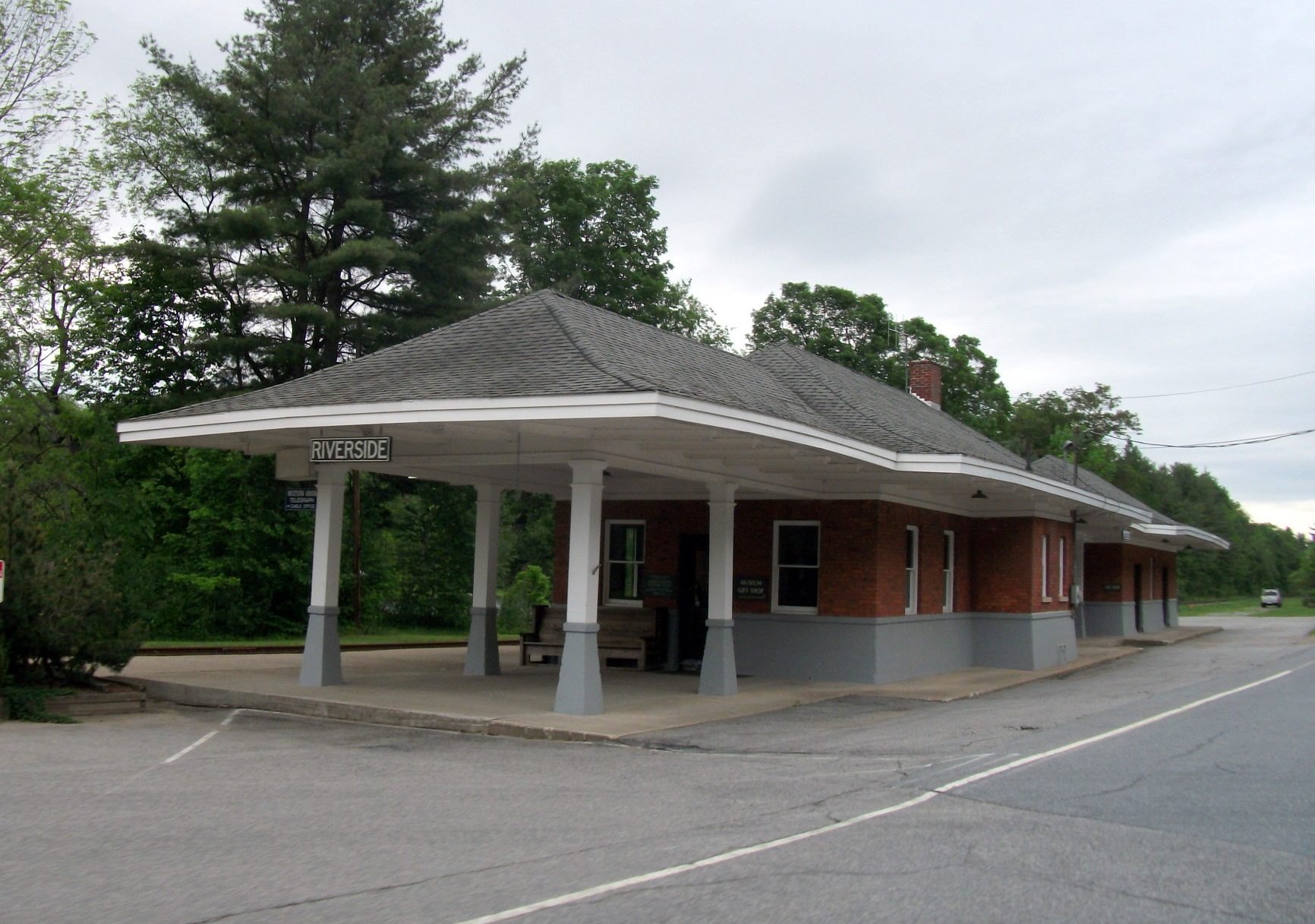
- Riverside station in June 2011

General information
- Location: Riverside Station Road, Riparius, New York
- Line: Adirondack branch

History
- Rebuilt: 1913

Former services
Preceding station	Delaware and Hudson Railway	Following station
North Creek Terminus	Saratoga Springs – North Creek	The Glen toward Saratoga Springs
- Riverside Train Station
- U.S. National Register of Historic Places
- Location within New York Location within the United States
- Location: Jct. of Hudson R. and NY 8, Hamlet of Riparius, Johnsburg, New York
- Coordinates: 43°39′40″N 73°53′58″W
- Area: 1 acre (0.40 ha)
- Built: 1913
- Architect: Delaware & Hudson Railroad
- Architectural style: Prairie School
- NRHP reference No.: 97000471
- Added to NRHP: June 5, 1997
Location

Riverside station is a historic railroad station located at Riparius, Warren County, New York. It was built in 1913 and is a one-story, rectangular (40 feet by 168 feet), hipped roof frame building with covered platforms at each end. A baggage room was added between 1915 and 1924. It was built by the Delaware and Hudson Railroad and embodies a Prairie School style design. It was also operated as a station for the Upper Hudson River Railroad scenic railway.

It was added to the National Register of Historic Places in 1997 as the Riverside Train Station.
