= Riparius, New York =

- hamlet
- Location within New York
- Coordinates: 43°39′42″N 73°53′49″W
- Country: United States
- State: New York
- County: Warren
- Elevation: 883 ft (269 m)
- Time zone: UTC-5 (Eastern (EST))
  - Summer (DST): UTC-4 (EDT)
- ZIP code: 12862
- Area code: 518
- GNIS feature ID: 962541

Riparius is a hamlet in the Upper Hudson River Valley of Warren County, New York, United States. Riparius was formerly known as Riverside until the state changed the name to prevent confusion with several other places of the same name. "Riparius" is a Latin equivalent for "Riverside". Riparius is located within the towns of Johnsburg and Chester.

Riparius is currently the terminus of the Upper Hudson River Railroad, a tourist train which departs from North Creek during summer months. The "Riverside Station" is listed on the National Register of Historic Places.

== See also ==
- Riparius Bridge
