= Southwind =

Southwind may refer to:

- Southwind Drum and Bugle Corps
- Southwind Rail Travel Limited
- USCGC Southwind (WAGB-280)
- Southwind, a Filipino alternative band origin from Davao
- Southwind, an American band from Los Angeles in the late 1960s
- Southwind Airlines, a Turkish charter flights airline
- Southwind Vineyard & Winery, a winery in New Jersey

== See also ==
- South wind
