= Saratoga County, New York =

County in New York, United States

- County
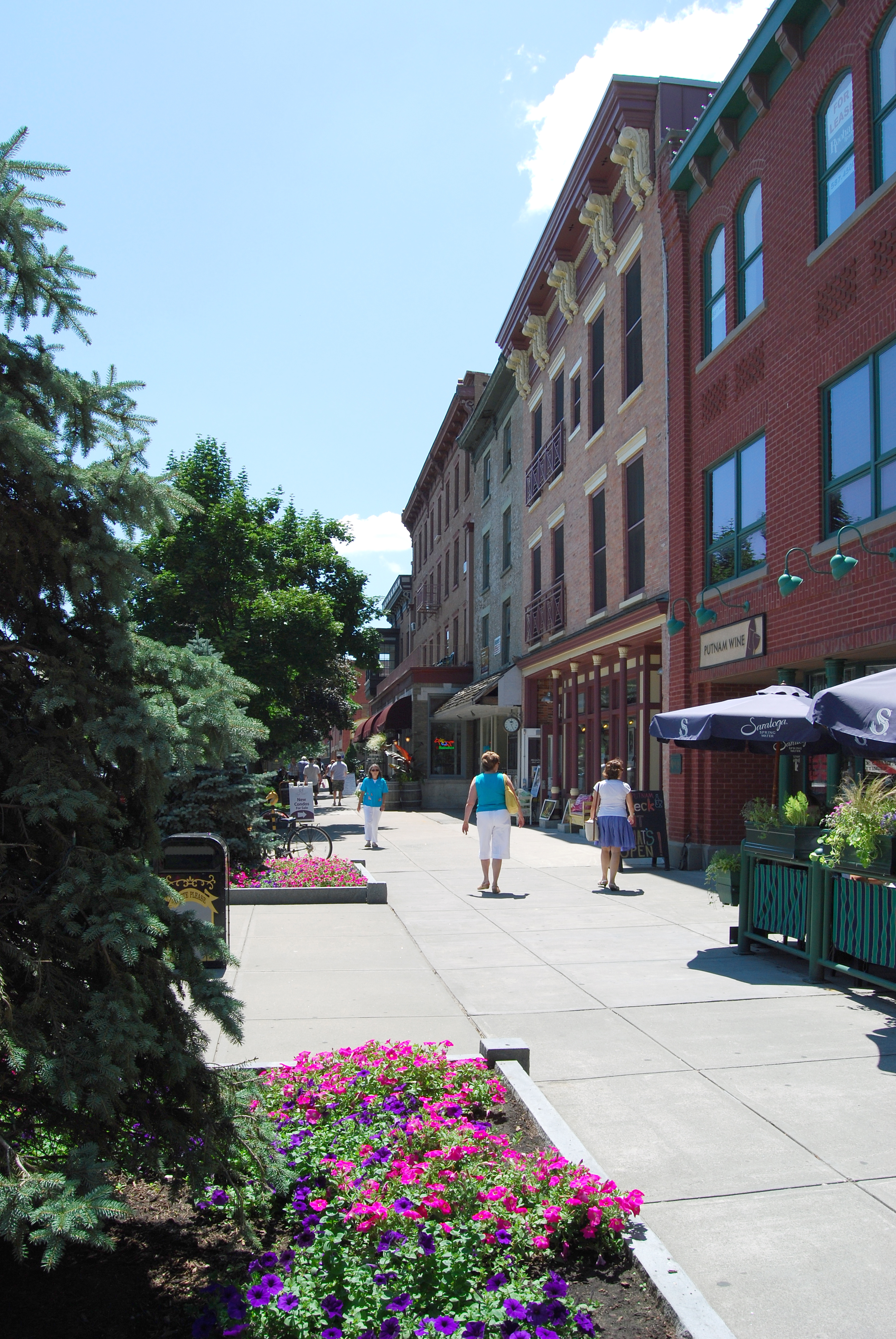
- Downtown Saratoga Springs

- Flag Seal

- Location within the U.S. state of New York
- Coordinates: 43°07′N 73°52′W
- Country: United States
- State: New York
- Founded: February 7, 1791; 235 years ago (Note: "On February 7, 1791, taken from Albany, the county of Saratoga was organized.")
- Named for: Iroquois sah-rah-ka, "the hill beside the river"
- Seat: Ballston Spa
- Largest city: Clifton Park, New York

Area
  - Total: 844 sq mi (2,190 km^{2})
  - Land: 810 sq mi (2,100 km^{2})
  - Water: 34 sq mi (88 km^{2}) 4.0%

Population (2020)
  - Total: 235,509
  - Estimate (2025): 241,343 ▲
  - Density: 290.8/sq mi (112.3/km^{2})
- Time zone: UTC−5 (Eastern)
  - Summer (DST): UTC−4 (EDT)
- Congressional districts: 20th, 21st
- Website: saratogacountyny.gov
- Highest elevation: 2,759 ft (841 m) (Tenant Mountain), in the Adirondack Mountains. Lowest elevation: 69 ft (21 m), at the confluence of the Hudson River and the Mohawk River.

Interactive map of Saratoga County, New York

Saratoga County is a county in the U.S. state of New York, and is the fastest-growing county in Upstate New York. As of the 2020 United States census, the county's population was enumerated at 235,509, its highest decennial count ever and a 7.2% increase from the 219,607 recorded at the 2010 census, representing one of the fastest growth rates in New York. The county seat is Ballston Spa. The county is part of the Capital District region of the state.

Saratoga County's name was derived from the Iroquois word sah-rah-ka or sarach-togue, meaning "the hill beside the river", referring to the Hudson River bordering the county on its eastern flank and the Mohawk River delineating its southern border. Saratoga County, bisected by the toll-free, six-lane Adirondack Northway, serves as an outdoor recreational haven and as the gateway to the Adirondack Mountains and State Park for the populations of the Albany and New York City metropolitan areas. The county is also home to the internationally renowned Saratoga Race Course, one of the oldest venues in horse racing.

Saratoga County lies in the heart of eastern New York State's recognized Tech Valley, a growing center for the computer hardware side of the high-technology industry and its venture capital investment, with progress in the nanotechnology sector, digital electronics design, and water- and electricity-dependent integrated microchip circuit manufacturing, and more recently, artificial intelligence and AI-based photonics and quantum computing hardware manufacturing, involving companies including IBM, GlobalFoundries, Samsung, and Taiwan Semiconductor, among others. In April 2021, GlobalFoundries, a company specializing in the semiconductor industry, moved its headquarters from Silicon Valley, California to its advanced semiconductor-chip manufacturing facility in Saratoga County near a section of the Adirondack Northway, in Malta, New York.

The county is also frequently recognized for its high standard of living and quality of life. Saratoga County touts its strongly academic schools, clean environment and relatively cool climate, abundance of clean water and electricity, natural beauty and recreational opportunities, low county tax rates, and availability of new housing in its approach to robust growth in the county's high-tech workforce.

== History ==
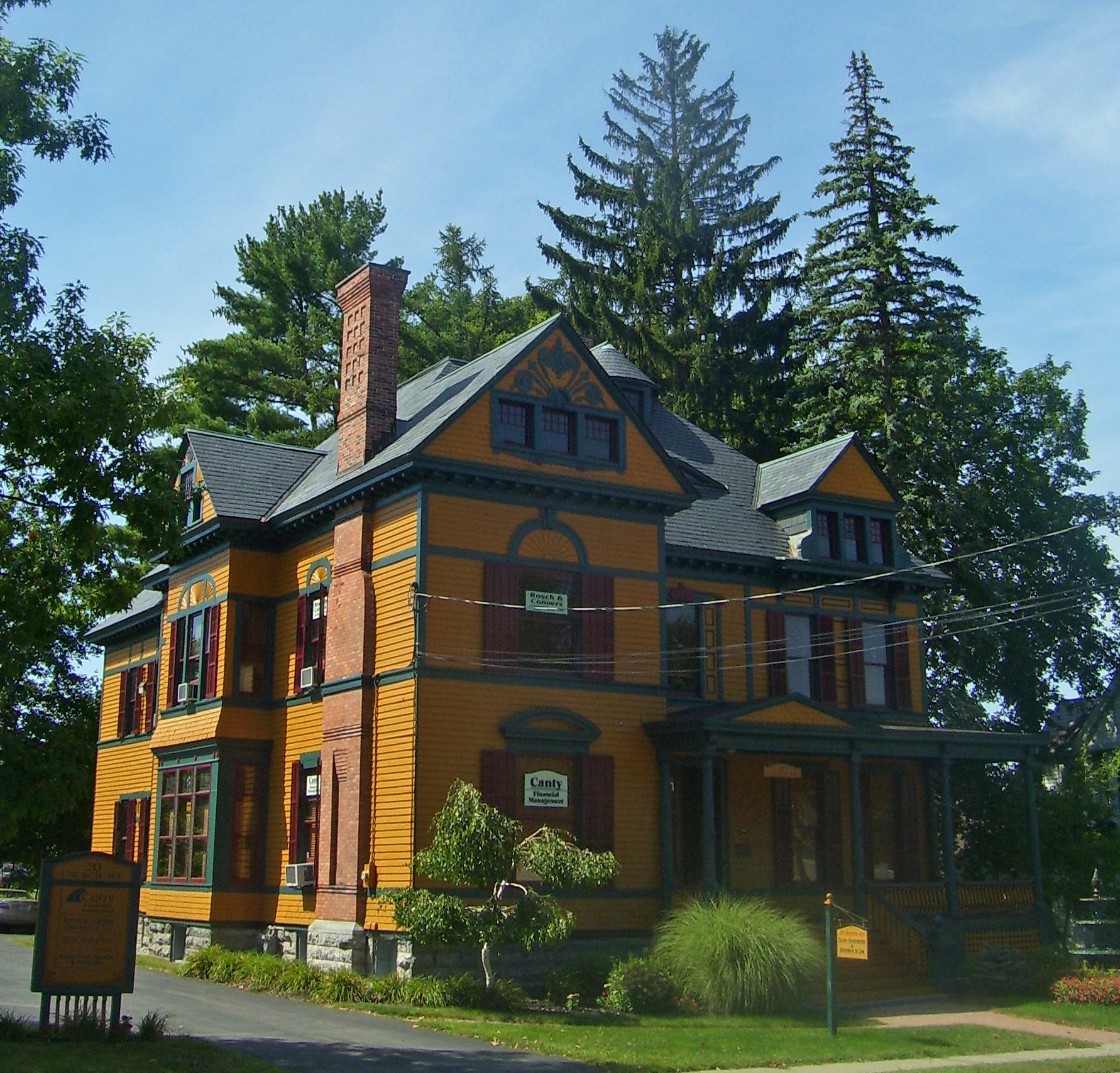
The historic Verbeck House in Ballston Spa

When counties were established in the Province of New York in 1683, the present Saratoga County was part of Albany County. This was an enormous county, including the northern part of New York, as well as all of the present state of Vermont and, in theory, extending westward to the Pacific Ocean. This large county was progressively reduced in size by the separation of several counties until 1791, when Saratoga County and Rensselaer County were split off from Albany County. The Battles of Saratoga (September 19 and October 7, 1777) marked the climax of the Saratoga campaign, giving a decisive victory to the Americans over the British in the American Revolutionary War, which convinced France that the Thirteen Colonies could win the war. The government of Louis XVI began lending military and financial aid to the American Patriot cause.

During the 19th century, Saratoga County was an important industrial center. Its location 30 miles north of Albany on the Delaware and Hudson Railway, as well as its proximity to water power from the Hudson River and the Kayaderosseras Creek, led to rapid industrial development beginning in the early 19th century. Some of the most important industrial employers were paper mills, tanneries, foundries, and textile mills.

Since the construction of the Adirondack Northway in the 1960s, Saratoga County has consistently been the fastest-growing county in the Capital District and indeed, in Upstate New York, and one of the fastest-growing in the Northeastern United States. The county has historically maintained a low county tax rate; according to its official website, Saratoga County levies one of the lowest county tax rates in New York.

== Geography ==
Saratoga County is situated in the eastern portion of New York State, north of the state capital city of Albany, northwest of Troy, and east of Utica. According to the U.S. Census Bureau, the county has a total area of 844 square miles (2,190 km^{2}), of which 810 square miles (2,100 km^{2}) are land and 34 square miles (88 km^{2}) (4.0%) are covered by water. The Hudson River forms the eastern border of the county, while the Mohawk River demarcates its southern border. The highest elevation in Saratoga County is at the peak of Tenant Mountain in the Adirondack Mountains, at 2,759 ft (841 m), while the lowest elevation is 69 ft (21 m), at the waterfront of the Village of Waterford, at the confluence of the Mohawk and Hudson Rivers.

=== Adjacent counties ===
Saratoga County is bordered by eight counties. Listed clockwise, they are:

- Warren County - north
- Washington County - east
- Rensselaer County - southeast
- Albany County - south
- Schenectady County - southwest
- Montgomery County - southwest
- Fulton County - west
- Hamilton County - northwest

== Demographics ==
Historical population
Census	Pop.	Note	%±
1800	24,483		—
1810	33,147		35.4%
1820	36,052		8.8%
1830	38,679		7.3%
1840	40,553		4.8%
1850	45,646		12.6%
1860	51,729		13.3%
1870	51,529		−0.4%
1880	55,156		7.0%
1890	57,663		4.5%
1900	61,089		5.9%
1910	61,917		1.4%
1920	60,029		−3.0%
1930	63,314		5.5%
1940	65,606		3.6%
1950	74,869		14.1%
1960	89,096		19.0%
1970	121,679		36.6%
1980	153,759		26.4%
1990	181,276		17.9%
2000	200,635		10.7%
2010	219,607		9.5%
2020	235,509		7.2%
2025 (est.)	241,343	▲	2.5%
U.S. Decennial Census; 1790-1960 1900-1990; 1990-2000 2010, 2020, and 2023

=== 2020 census ===
In 1960, Saratoga County had a population of only 89,000, less than half of its population noted at the 2020 United States census, enumerated at 235,509. Saratoga County has continued its robust growth in the 2020s, in spite of the COVID-19 pandemic.

Saratoga County, New York – Racial and ethnic composition Note: the US Census treats Hispanic/Latino as an ethnic category. This table excludes Latinos from the racial categories and assigns them to a separate category. Hispanics/Latinos may be of any race.
Race / Ethnicity (NH = Non-Hispanic)	Pop 1980	Pop 1990	Pop 2000	Pop 2010	Pop 2020	% 1980	% 1990	% 2000	% 2010	% 2020
White alone (NH)	150,452	175,536	190,840	203,647	203,781	97.85%	96.83%	95.12%	92.73%	86.53%
Black or African American alone (NH)	1,363	2,131	2,628	3,053	3,752	0.89%	1.18%	1.31%	1.39%	1.59%
Native American or Alaska Native alone (NH)	184	253	326	325	301	0.12%	0.14%	0.16%	0.15%	0.13%
Asian alone (NH)	576	1,321	2,064	3,880	7,444	0.37%	0.73%	1.03%	1.77%	3.16%
Native Hawaiian or Pacific Islander alone (NH)	x	x	32	35	60	x	x	0.02%	0.02%	0.03%
Other race alone (NH)	182	84	165	227	833	0.12%	0.05%	0.08%	0.10%	0.35%
Mixed race or Multiracial (NH)	x	x	1,746	3,161	10,671	x	x	0.87%	1.44%	4.53%
Hispanic or Latino (any race)	1,002	1,951	2,834	5,279	8,667	0.65%	1.08%	1.41%	2.40%	3.68%
Total	153,759	181,276	200,635	219,607	235,509	100.00%	100.00%	100.00%	100.00%	100.00%

=== 2010 census ===
As of the 2010 U.S. census, there were 219,607 people, 88,296 households, and 58,814 families residing in Saratoga County. The population density was 271 inhabitants per square mile (105/km^{2}). There were 98,656 housing units at an average density of 122 units per square mile (47/km^{2}). The racial makeup of the county was 94.3% White, 1.8% Asian, 1.5% Black or African American, 0.2% Native American, 0.0% Pacific Islander, 0.5% from other races, and 1.7% from two or more races. 2.4% of the population were Hispanic or Latino of any race.

There were 88,296 households, out of which 29.5% had children under the age of 18 living with them, 53.3% were married couples living together, 9.1% had a female householder with no husband present, and 33.4% were non-families. 26.1% of all households were made up of individuals, 31.5% of households had individuals under 18 years, and 9.5% had someone living alone who was 65 years of age or older. The average household size was 2.44 and the average family size was 2.96.

Of Saratoga County's population in 2010, 6.3% were between ages of 5 and 9 years, 6.7% between 10 and 14 years, 6.5% between 15 and 19 years, 5.5% between 20 and 24 years, 5.5% between 25 and 29 years, 5.8% between 30 and 34 years, 6.6% between 35 and 39 years, 7.9% between 40 and 44 years, 8.5% between 45 and 49 years, 8.0% between 50 and 54 years, 7.0% between 55 and 59 years, 6.4% between 60 and 64 years, and 13.7% of age 65 years and over. 22.7% of the county's population was under age 18. The median age was 40.9 years.

According to the 2009-2013 American Community Survey, the median income for a household in Saratoga County was $69,826, and the median income for a family was $87,058. Males had a median income of $59,636 versus $44,743 for females. The per capita income for the county was $35,176. About 4.0% of families and 6.5% of the population were below the poverty line, including 7.4% of those under age 18 and 6.1% of those age 65 or over.

== Transportation ==
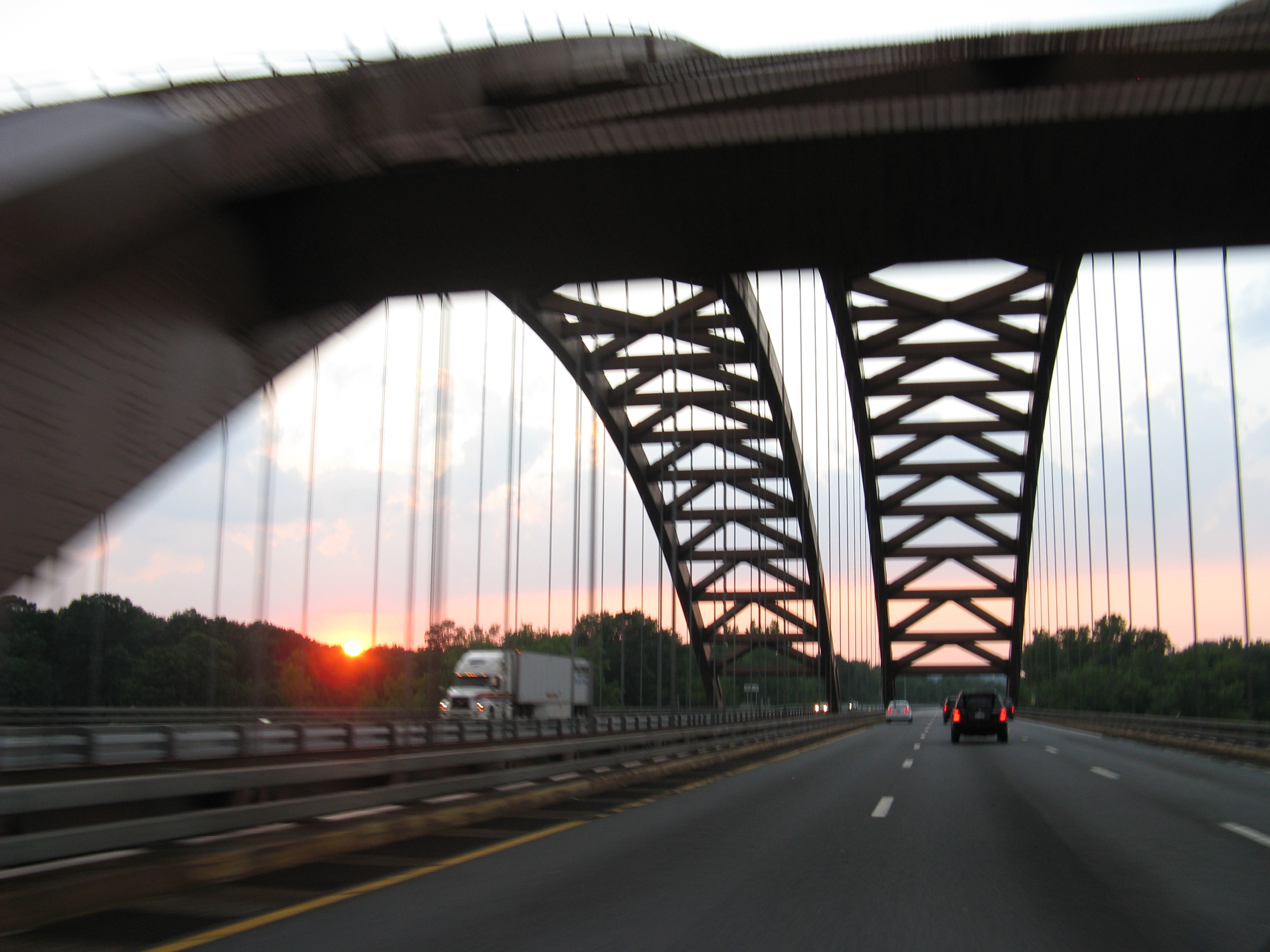
The Thaddeus Kosciusko Bridge, crossing the Mohawk River, is the portion of the toll-free, six-lane Adirondack Northway which connects Halfmoon in Saratoga County to Colonie in Albany County.

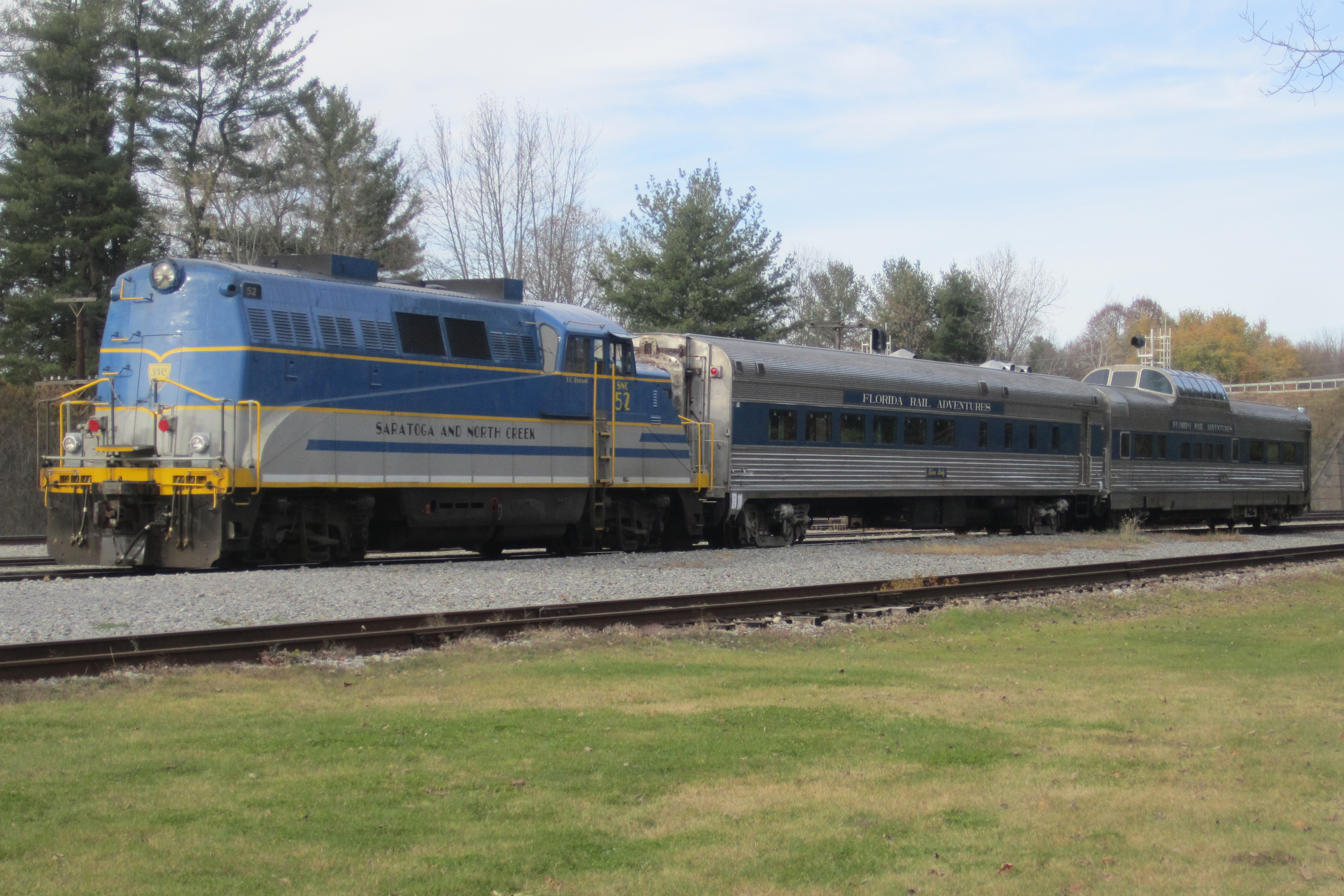
A Saratoga and North Creek Railway train at the Saratoga Springs Amtrak station; this railway service until 2018 operated between Saratoga County and the Adirondack Park.

=== Adirondack Northway ===
The toll-free, six-lane Adirondack Northway bisects Saratoga County, running in a south–north direction. The highway, designated Interstate 87, is the primary conduit connecting the capital of New York, Albany, northward across the Thaddeus Kosciusko Bridge into and through Saratoga County, then past Lake George in the Adirondack Park, through the Adirondack Mountains, and eventually to the Canada–United States border, where it continues seamlessly as Quebec Autoroute 15 to Montreal. The freeway has been a major catalyst for the growth of population and commerce in Saratoga County.

=== Rail ===
The Saratoga and North Creek Railway was a heritage railway that operated from 2011 to 2018 between the Saratoga Springs Amtrak station at its southern terminus and North Creek in the Adirondack Park at its northern terminus. Its commercial operations were originally built by the Adirondack Railway (succeeded by the Delaware and Hudson). Amtrak's Ethan Allen Express and Adirondack services remain at Saratoga Springs.

=== Airports ===
These public-use general aviation airports are located in Saratoga County:

- Saratoga County Airport (5B2) – Saratoga Springs
- Garnseys Airport (B04) – Schuylerville
- Heber Airpark (K30) – Gansevoort
- Plateau Sky Ranch Airport (1F2) – Edinburg
- Round Lake Airport (W57) – Round Lake

== Economy ==
=== Tech Valley ===
Since the 2000s, the economy of Saratoga County and the surrounding Capital District has been redirected toward high technology. Tech Valley is a marketing name for the eastern part of New York, encompassing Saratoga County, the Capital District, and the Hudson Valley. Originated in 1998 to promote the greater Albany area as a high-tech competitor to regions such as Silicon Valley and Boston, it has since grown to represent the counties in the Capital District and extending to IBM's Westchester County plants in the south and the Canada–US border to the north. The area's high-technology ecosystem is supported by technologically focused academic institutions including Rensselaer Polytechnic Institute and the State University of New York Polytechnic Institute. Tech Valley encompasses 19 counties straddling both sides of the Adirondack Northway and the New York Thruway, and with heavy state taxpayer subsidy, has experienced significant growth in the computer hardware side of the high-technology industry, with great strides in the nanotechnology sector, digital electronics design, and water- and electricity-dependent integrated microchip circuit manufacturing, and more recently, artificial intelligence, involving companies including GlobalFoundries in Malta and others. Saratoga County touts its high standard of living and quality of life, strongly academic schools, clean environment and relatively cool climate, abundance of clean water and electricity, natural beauty and recreational opportunities, low county rax rates, and availability of new housing in its approach to robust growth in the county's high-tech workforce.

Adirondack Trust Company is the largest independent community bank in Saratoga County. Adirondack Trust's 167 full-time employees own the company, which offers banking, loans and investment services, along with insurance through its Amsure subsidiary. As of December 2020, the bank reported almost $1.5 billion in assets, and over $1.3 billion in deposits, across 13 branches.

== Recreation ==
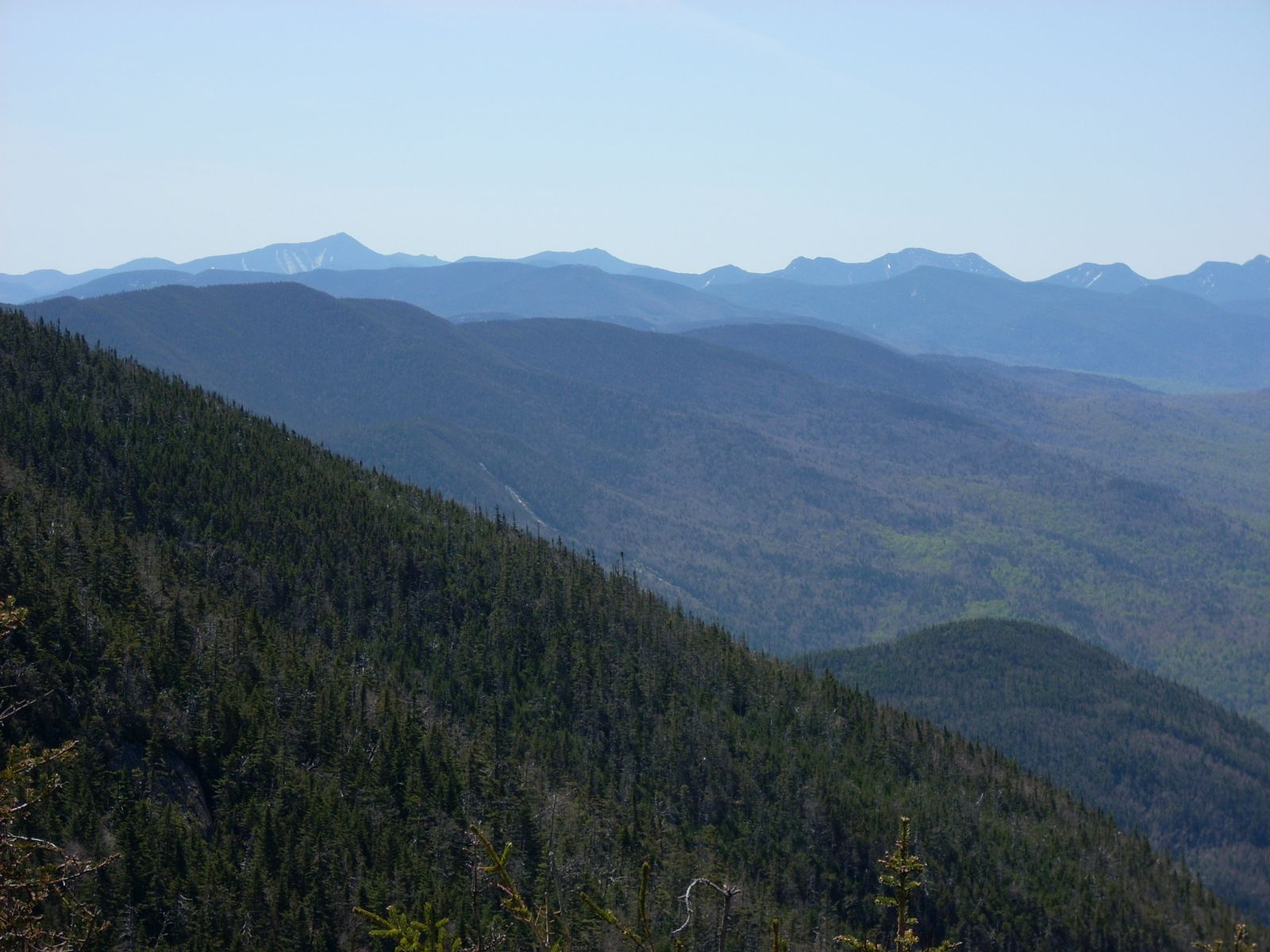
Northwestern Saratoga County serves as the southern gateway to the Adirondack Park; the higher peaks of the Adirondack Mountains are farther north.

Towering trees line the Avenue of the Pines in Saratoga Spa State Park.

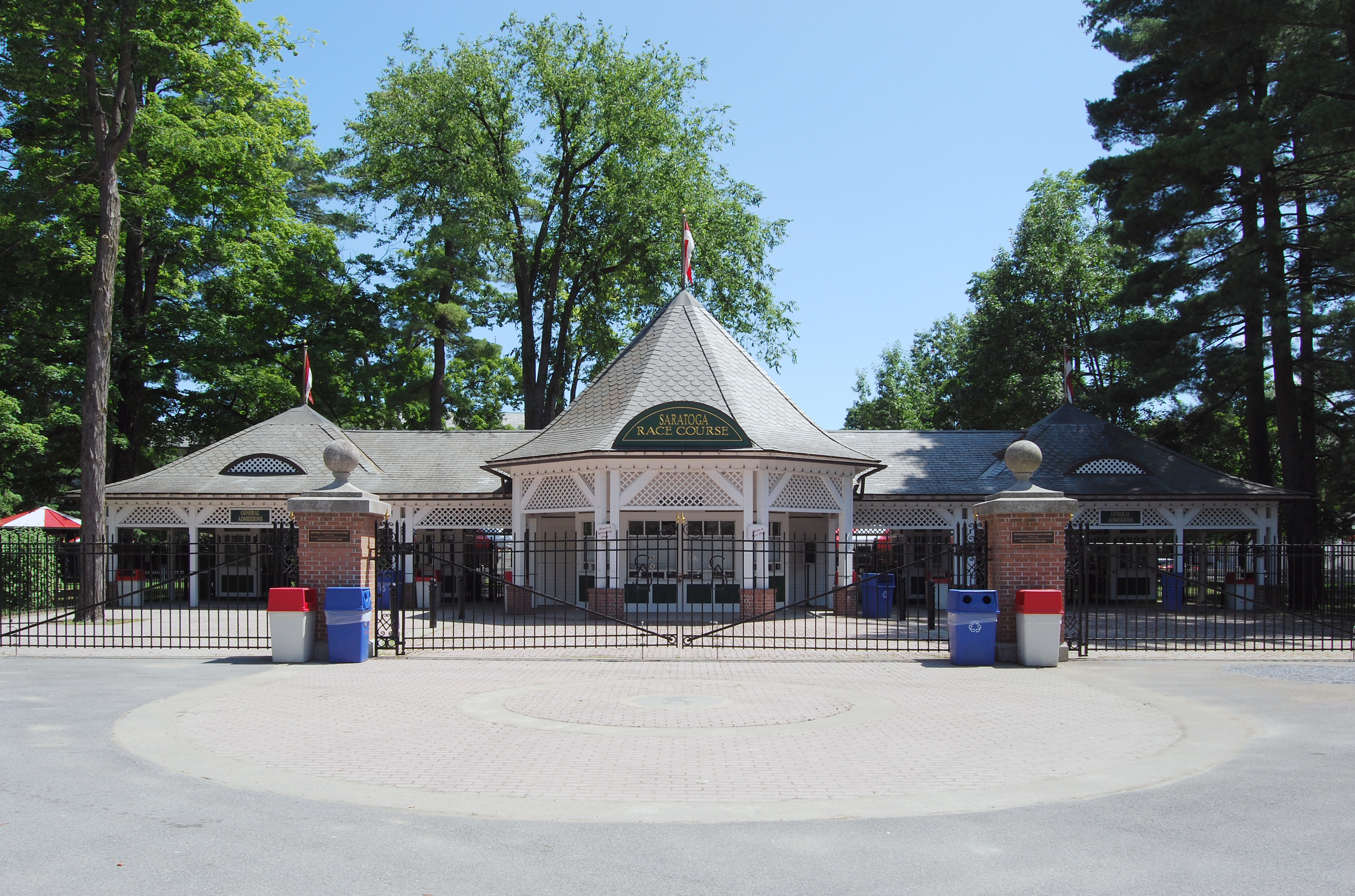
An entrance to the Saratoga Race Course in Saratoga Springs

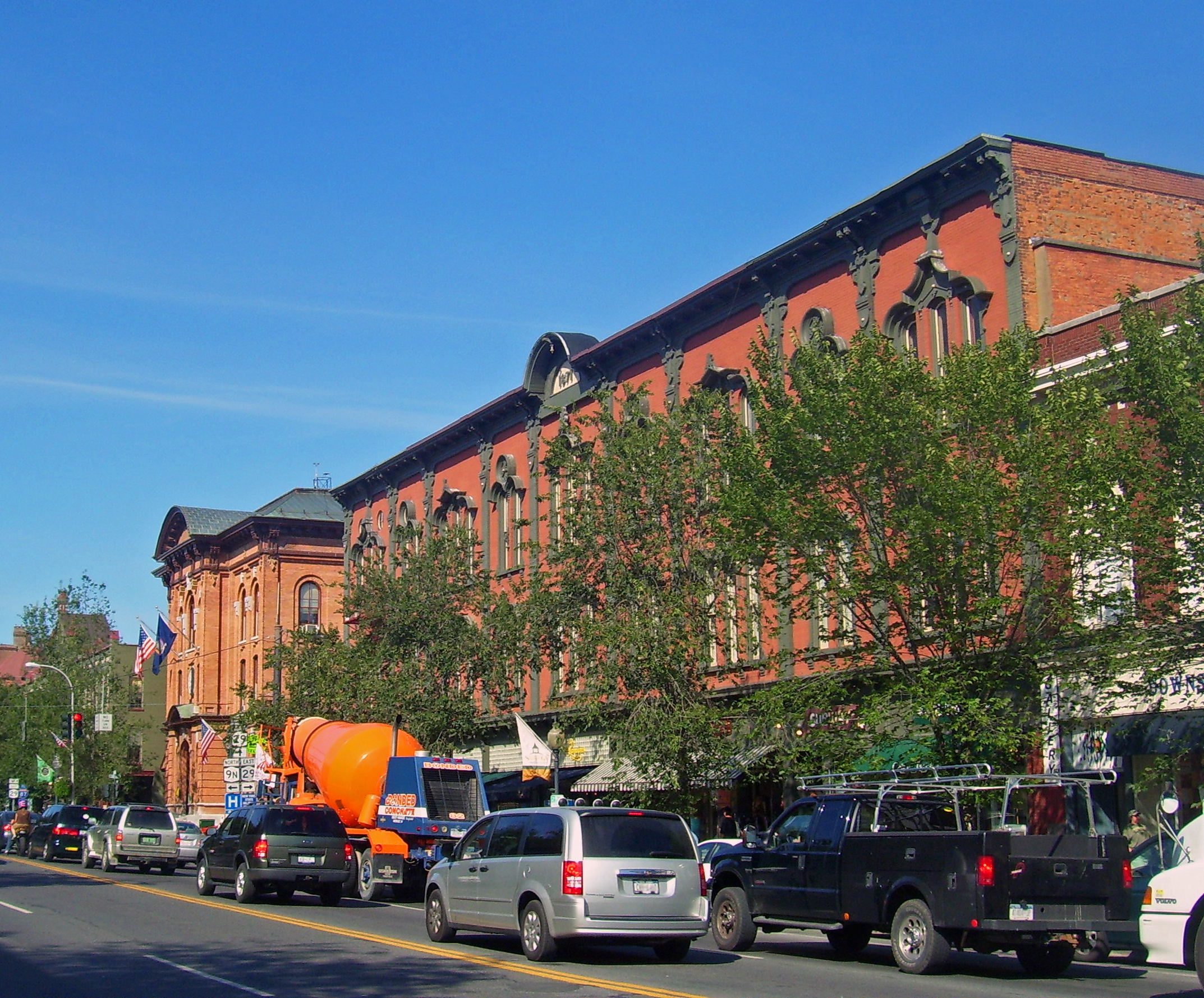
The Broadway Historic District in Downtown Saratoga Springs

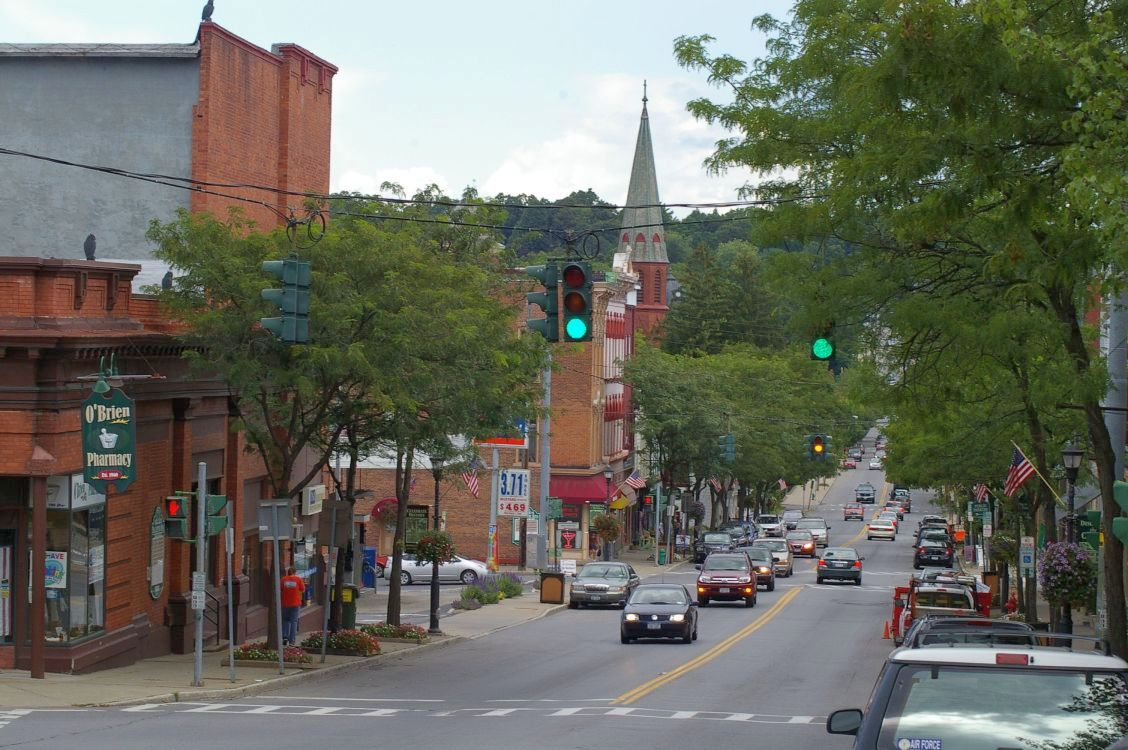
The historic Village of Ballston Spa is the county seat of Saratoga County.

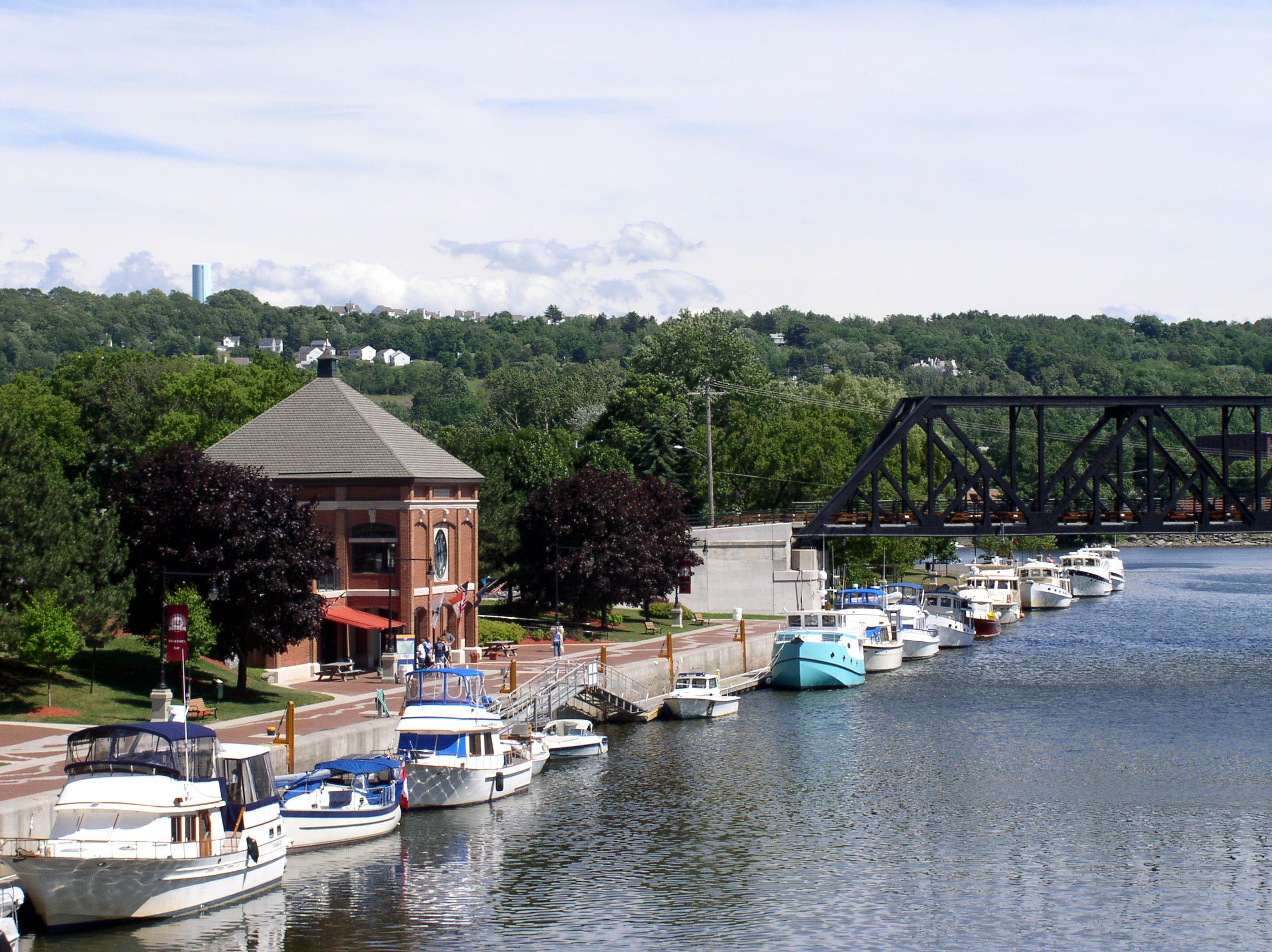
Waterford Harbor at the Village of Waterford, on the Mohawk River

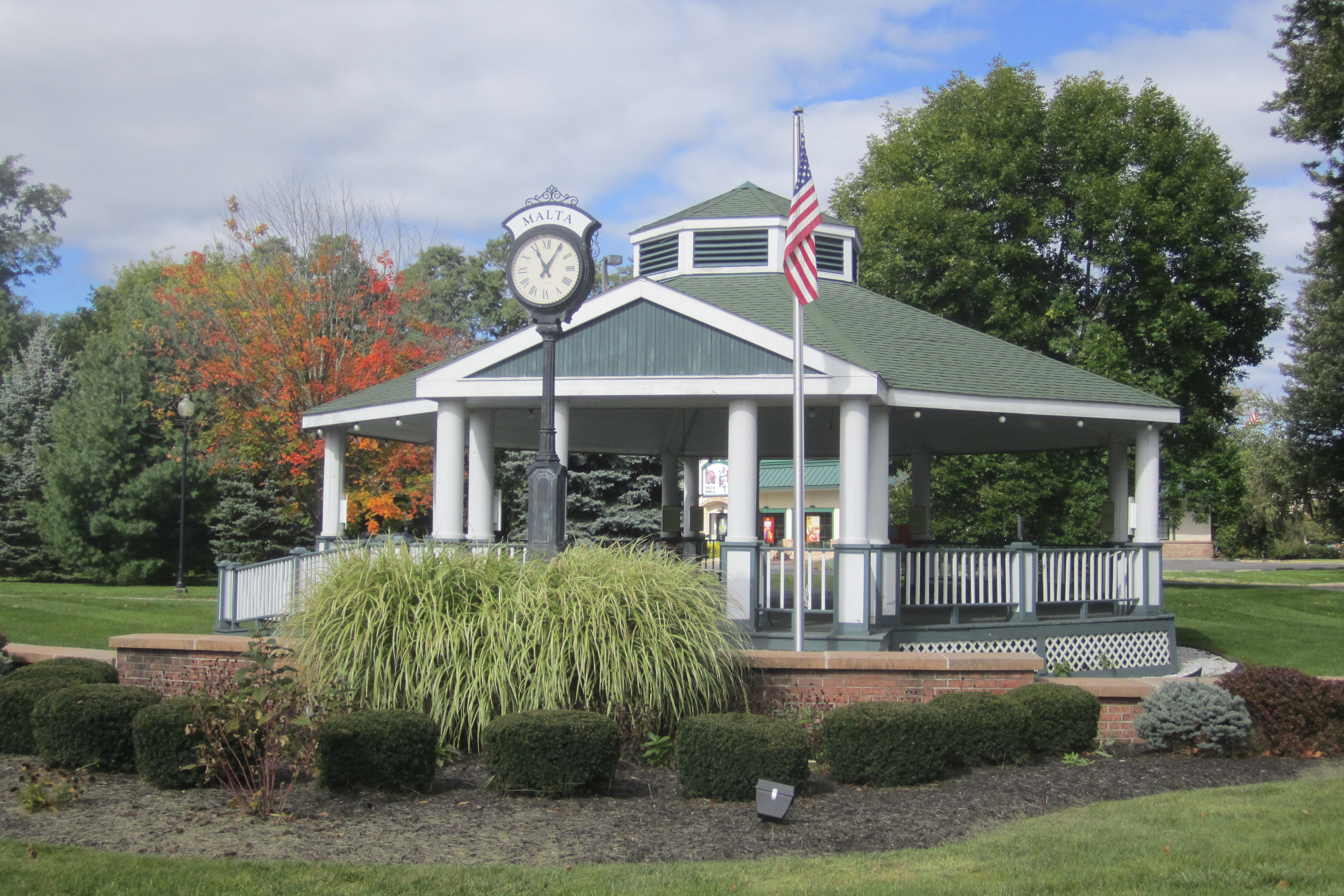
The Town of Malta, home to the "Fab 8" campus of GlobalFoundries, a semiconductor foundry

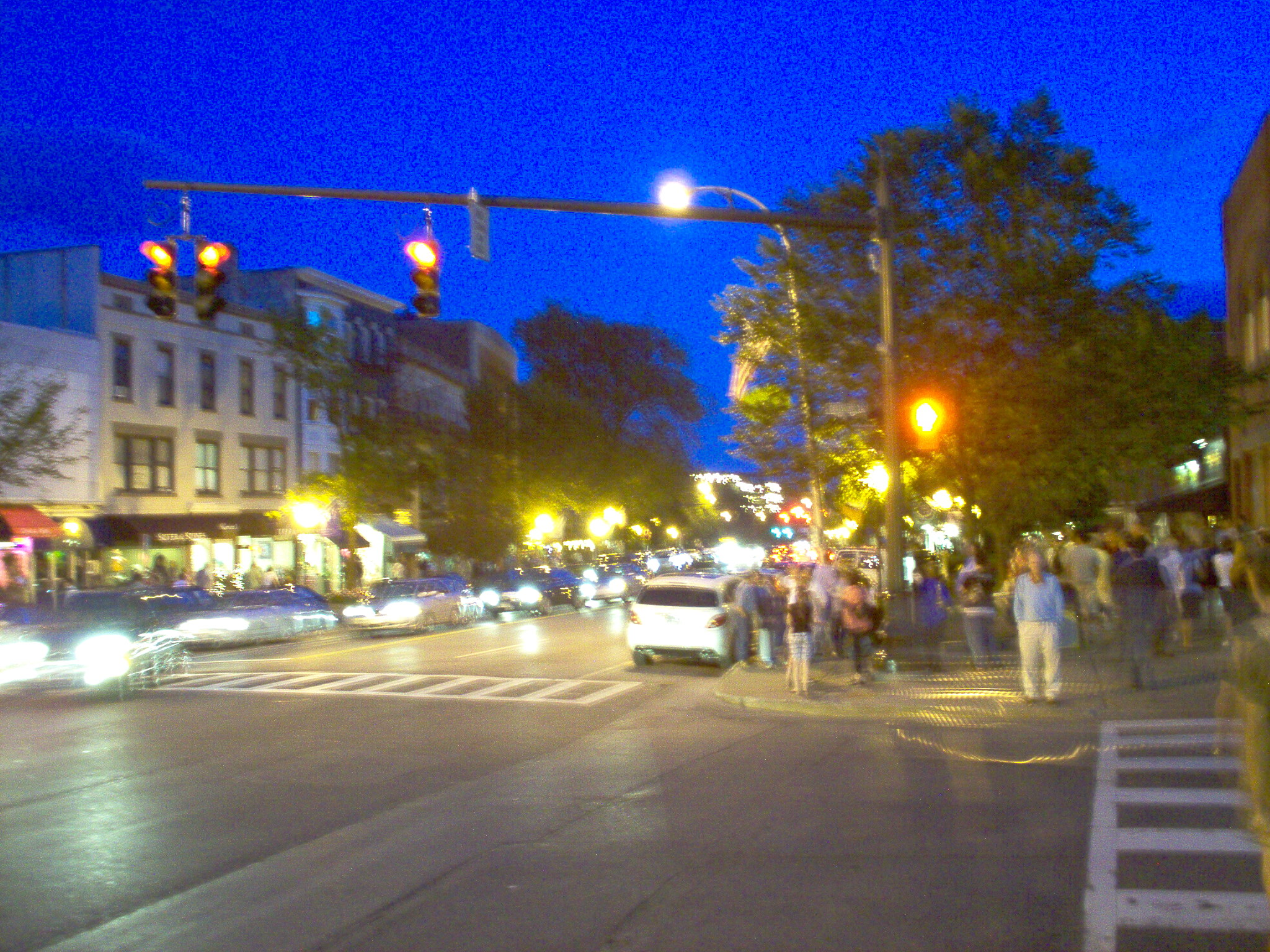
Nightlife on Broadway in Saratoga Springs

Saratoga County is popular between late July and early September each year due to the Saratoga Race Course being open. This track dates back to 1863, when it was founded by John Morrissey. Thoroughbred horse racing in the United States has its own Hall of Fame in Saratoga Springs, which honors horses, jockeys, owners, and trainers. Horse-racing fans attend the races.

The Saratoga National Historical Park is located along the Hudson River in Stillwater, and features a drive-around trail where one can drive up to each station. The park is also famous for its outstanding views of the area's natural scenery and Vermont's Green Mountains in the distance.

The Saratoga Spa State Park capitalizes on the culture and the mineral springs that once drove Saratoga County. This is a large state park and includes a hotel, two pool complexes, mineral baths, Saratoga Performing Arts Center, picnic areas, hiking trails, and numerous mineral springs.

Saratoga County serves as the southern gateway to the Adirondack Park, the largest park in the contiguous United States, covering about 6.1 million acres (2.5×10^{6} ha), a land area roughly the size of Vermont and greater than the areas of the National Parks of Yellowstone, Grand Canyon, Glacier, and Great Smoky Mountains combined. A portion of northwestern Saratoga County lies within the boundaries of the Adirondack Park and includes Hadley Mountain.

== Education ==
=== Unified school districts ===
School districts include:

- Amsterdam City School District
- Ballston Spa Central School District
- Broadalbin-Perth Central School District
- Burnt Hills-Ballston Lake Central School District
- Corinth Central School District
- Edinburg Common School District
- Galway Central School District
- Hadley-Luzerne Central School District
- Hudson Falls Central School District
- Mechanicville City School District
- Niskayuna Central School District
- Northville Central School District
- Saratoga Springs City School District
- Schuylerville Central School District
- Scotia-Glenville Central School District
- Shenendehowa Central School District
- South Glens Falls Central School District
- Stillwater Central School District
- Waterford-Halfmoon Union Free School District

=== Colleges and universities ===
- Bryant & Stratton College
- Skidmore College
- SUNY Empire State University

== Communities ==
=== Cities ===
- Mechanicville
- Saratoga Springs

=== Towns ===
- Ballston
- Charlton
- Clifton Park
- Corinth
- Day
- Edinburg
- Galway
- Greenfield
- Hadley
- Halfmoon
- Malta
- Milton
- Moreau
- Northumberland
- Providence
- Saratoga
- Stillwater
- Waterford
- Wilton

=== Villages ===
- Ballston Spa (county seat)
- Corinth
- Galway
- Round Lake
- Schuylerville
- South Glens Falls
- Stillwater
- Victory
- Waterford

=== Census-designated places ===
- Clifton Gardens
- Clifton Knolls-Mill Creek
- Country Knolls
- Hadley
- Milton
- North Ballston Spa

=== Hamlets ===
- Bloodville
- Burnt Hills
- Crescent
- Gansevoort
- Greenfield Center
- Jonesville
- Middle Grove
- Porter Corners
- Quaker Springs
- Rexford
- Rock City Falls
- Vischer Ferry
- West Milton

== Government ==
United States presidential election results for Saratoga County, New York
Year	Republican		Democratic		Third party(ies)	
Year	No.	%	No.	%	No.	%
1884	8,190	56.28%	5,846	40.17%	517	3.55%
1888	8,594	54.36%	6,570	41.56%	646	4.09%
1892	7,383	51.83%	5,755	40.40%	1,106	7.76%
1896	9,638	63.57%	4,987	32.89%	536	3.54%
1900	9,602	59.79%	5,916	36.84%	541	3.37%
1904	9,546	58.46%	6,149	37.66%	634	3.88%
1908	8,706	54.49%	6,518	40.80%	752	4.71%
1912	6,401	43.71%	5,296	36.16%	2,947	20.12%
1916	8,062	53.00%	6,711	44.12%	438	2.88%
1920	16,222	67.99%	6,905	28.94%	731	3.06%
1924	17,682	65.84%	7,026	26.16%	2,148	8.00%
1928	19,183	59.60%	12,247	38.05%	757	2.35%
1932	17,990	56.97%	13,053	41.34%	535	1.69%
1936	19,153	55.90%	14,619	42.66%	494	1.44%
1940	21,298	58.46%	15,037	41.27%	98	0.27%
1944	20,197	59.26%	13,788	40.45%	98	0.29%
1948	20,706	61.50%	11,457	34.03%	1,503	4.46%
1952	29,712	72.17%	11,413	27.72%	43	0.10%
1956	32,522	77.69%	9,338	22.31%	0	0.00%
1960	25,035	57.88%	18,179	42.03%	36	0.08%
1964	13,364	31.32%	29,264	68.57%	47	0.11%
1968	25,658	55.87%	17,766	38.69%	2,498	5.44%
1972	40,582	69.22%	17,899	30.53%	150	0.26%
1976	38,296	61.29%	23,768	38.04%	422	0.68%
1980	34,184	52.30%	23,641	36.17%	7,537	11.53%
1984	47,394	67.91%	22,166	31.76%	228	0.33%
1988	43,498	57.39%	31,684	41.81%	606	0.80%
1992	36,917	41.10%	33,011	36.76%	19,884	22.14%
1996	34,337	40.08%	39,832	46.50%	11,496	13.42%
2000	46,623	49.05%	43,359	45.61%	5,075	5.34%
2004	56,158	52.55%	48,730	45.60%	1,985	1.86%
2008	52,855	47.45%	56,645	50.85%	1,887	1.69%
2012	50,382	47.75%	52,957	50.19%	2,171	2.06%
2016	54,575	47.83%	50,913	44.62%	8,606	7.54%
2020	61,305	46.21%	68,471	51.62%	2,879	2.17%
2024	63,940	48.88%	66,321	50.70%	551	0.42%

Saratoga County is governed by a Board Of Supervisors, with each town Supervisor acting as the representative from that community. The City of Saratoga Springs elects two Supervisors and the City of Mechanicville elects one supervisor to sit on the Board of Supervisors, but have no power in their respective city governments. The Town of Clifton Park also elects two Supervisors, one being the elected Town Supervisor, and one having only County duties. Voting is by weighted vote of each of the communities based on population, which is the reason why Saratoga Springs and Clifton Park, the two largest communities in Saratoga County, elect two Supervisors. The political makeup of the 2016-17 Board consists of 21 Republicans, and two Democrats. By long-standing tradition, whoever serves as chairman of the Board of Supervisor's powerful Law and Finance Committee one year serves as chairman of the full Board the following year—a tradition that has been broken only three times in Saratoga County's history. Under this custom, current Law and Finance Committee Chairman Arthur "Mo" Wright, the Supervisor of the Town of Hadley, is slated to become chairman of the full Board in 2016. Republicans hold the county-wide offices of sheriff, district attorney, county clerk, treasurer, and judges of the county, family, and the surrogate courts.

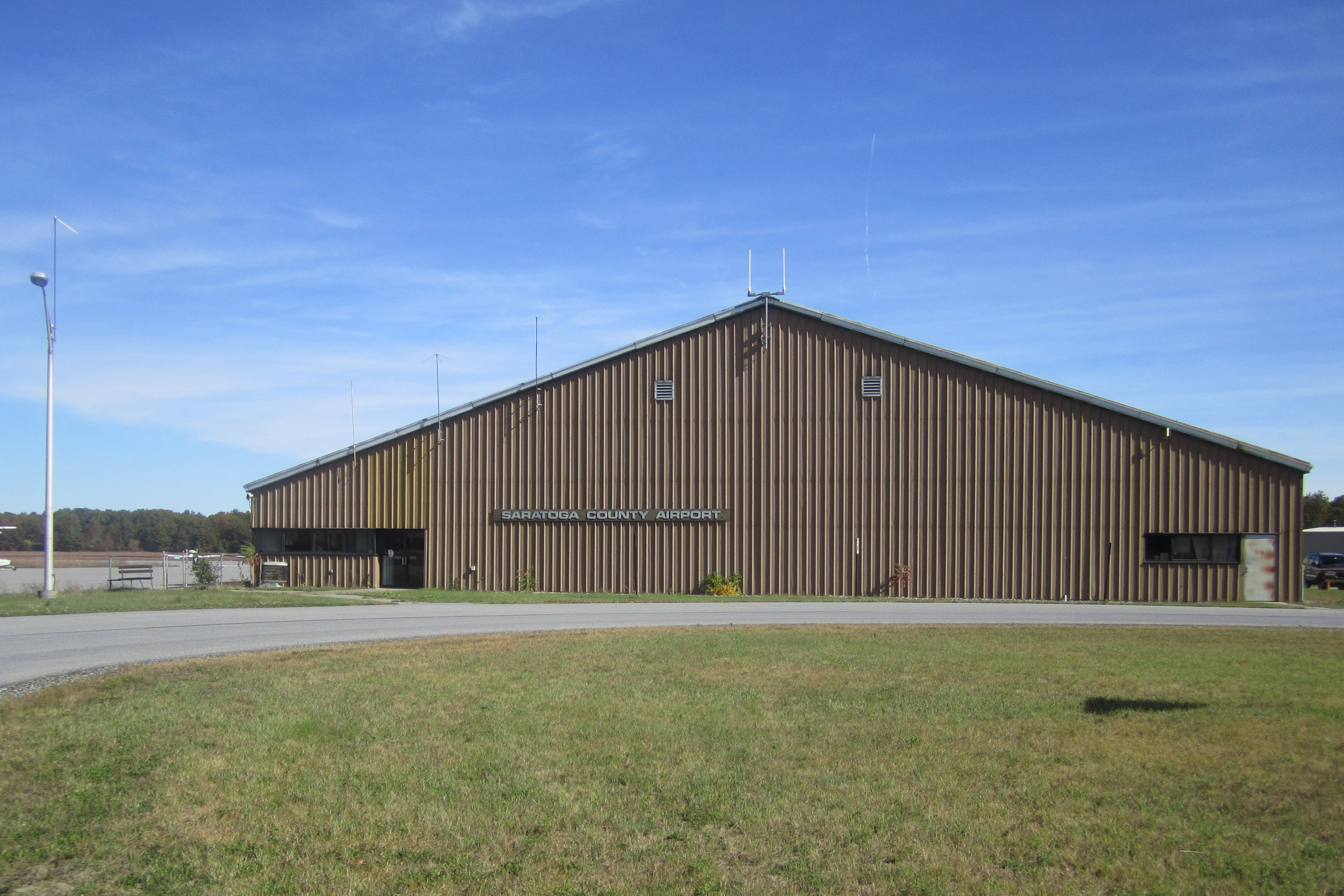
Saratoga County Airport, Saratoga Springs

On the presidential level, like most of the Hudson Valley, Saratoga County was historically powerfully Republican. It only supported a Democrat for president twice in the 20th century, in 1964 and 1996. The Republican edge narrowed somewhat in the 1990s and since then Saratoga County has been a Republican-leaning swing county. George W. Bush won the county narrowly in 2004 with 53% of the vote, while Barack Obama slightly edged out John McCain and Mitt Romney in both 2008 and 2012, becoming the first Democrat to win a majority in the county since 1964. In 2016, Saratoga County flipped back to the Republicans, with Donald Trump capturing a narrow plurality of the vote over Hillary Clinton. The flip proved to be temporary, with Democratic candidate Joe Biden winning the county in 2020.

The county is represented in the U.S. Congress by Republican Elise Stefanik and Democrat Paul Tonko. In the State Senate, the county is divided between Republicans Daphne Jordan and Jim Tedisco, while in the State Assembly Democrats John T. McDonald III and Carrie Woerner, along with Republicans Mary Beth Walsh and Dan Stec, each represent portions of the county.

James Davis is the County Court Judge since 2025. Davis is a former New York State deputy inspector general and replaced James A. Murphy III, his mentor.

James A. Bowen, who had been the dean of NYS Sheriffs, having served as Sheriff since 1972, when he was appointed by Governor Nelson A. Rockefeller; Bowen won the election for a new term in 1973 and had been elected every four years up until his retirement at the end of his tenth term in office in 2013, when he was succeeded by Michael H. Zurlo.

Democratic strength is best shown in the City of Saratoga Springs, which has voted Democratic in every presidential election since 1988. Republican strength is concentrated in the western part of the county, which is mostly rural or exurban. In 2005, the Democrats gained a majority on the Saratoga Springs City Council after decades of Republican dominance. The Republicans, however, reclaimed the council majority in the 2007 General Elections due to a split Democratic Party in the mayor's race. In 2009, the Republicans reclaimed their supermajority (4-1) on the City Council, by winning every contested election (Mayor, Finance, Public Safety, and Public Works). In 2011, Democrats reclaimed the Majority on the City Council, while Republican Scott Johnson was reelected as Mayor. The Current City Council (2016-2017) is 4-1 Democratic led by Mayor Meg Kelly. At the Saratoga County Board of Supervisors, the city is split, with one Republican and one Democrat holding the two Supervisor seats.

=== State Assembly ===
- John McDonald, Democratic, 108th District
- Mary Beth Walsh, Republican, 112th District
- Carrie Woerner, Democratic, 113th District
- Dan Stec, Republican, 114th District

=== State Senate ===
- Jim Tedisco, Republican, 44th District

=== United States House of Representatives ===
- Paul Tonko, Democratic, 20th District
- Elise Stefanik, Republican, 21st District

== Notable people ==
- David Hyde Pierce - actor
- Dottie Pepper - professional golfer
- Scott Underwood - drummer - former member of Train
- Justin Morrow - figure skater - 2-time U.S. Figure Skating national ice dancing medalist
- George Crum - chef - Known for being the creator of the potato chip
- Scott Valentine - actor - Best known for his role on "Family Ties"
- Monty Woolley - stage and screen actor - Best known for his role in "The Man Who Came to Dinner"
- Chauney Olcott - actor, songwriter, and singer - Best known for writing "My Wild Irish Rose"
- Kevin Huerter - professional basketball player for the Sacramento Kings
- Elise Stefanik - U.S. Congresswoman for NY, nominee for Ambassador to the United Nations, 2024
- Charles Dake - Co-founder of Stewart's Shops

== See also ==
- List of counties in New York
- National Register of Historic Places listings in Saratoga County, New York
