= Adirondack branch =

Railway line in New York, United States

Overview
- Owner: Warren County, New York; Corinth, New York

Service
- Operator(s): Saratoga Corinth and Hudson Railway

History
- Opened: December 1, 1865

Technical
- Line length: 57 mi (92 km)
- Track gauge: 1,435 mm (4 ft 8 1/2 in) standard gauge

The Adirondack branch is a railway line in the state New York. It runs 57 miles (92 km) from Saratoga Springs, New York, to North Creek, New York. The line was built by predecessors of the Delaware and Hudson Railway between 1865 and 1871. Ownership of the line is split between Warren County, New York, and the town of Corinth, New York. The Saratoga Corinth and Hudson Railway operates excursion service over part of the line. The Tahawus line runs another 29 miles (47 km) from North Creek to Tahawus, New York. It was built during World War II to serve a titanium mine and is now owned by a railbiking company.

== History ==
=== Delaware and Hudson (1865–1996) ===
Under the leadership of Thomas C. Durant, the Adirondack Company had begun building north from Saratoga Springs, New York, in 1865. Trains began running as far as Hadley, New York, on December 1, 1865. In Saratoga Springs, connection was made with the Rensselaer and Saratoga Railroad. The line reached North Creek, New York, in 1871. The Delaware and Hudson Railway gained control of the line in 1889 and merged the Adirondack Railway in 1902. During World War II, the line was extended further north to Tahawus, New York, to serve a titanium mine. The federal government owned the line and leased it to the D&H, which operated services.

Passenger service was reduced to summer-only in 1950 and discontinued altogether in 1957. Operations at the titanium mine ended in 1989, and the federal government sold the line between North Creek and Tahawus to NL Chemicals, the owner of the mine.

=== Public ownership (1996–present) ===
Warren County acquired the line between North Creek and Corinth, New York, in 1996. The Upper Hudson River Railroad began excursion service between North Creek and Riverside on October 17, 1998.

Corinth acquired the line between Corinth and Saratoga Springs in 2006. Corinth and Warren County did not renew the Upper Hudson River Railroad's contract in 2010, and the Iowa Pacific Holdings took over in 2011. The Saratoga and North Creek Railway began offering scheduled passenger service between North Creek and Saratoga Springs--not just excursion service--on July 23, 2011. The Saratoga and North Creek Railway also acquired the line between North Creek and Tahawus from NL Industries in 2011. The Saratoga and North Creek ceased operations on April 7, 2018.

The Saratoga Corinth and Hudson Railway began operating excursion service out of Corinth, New York, in 2022. Revolution Rail, a railbiking company, acquired the line between North Creek and Tahawus in 2022.
