= Schenectady station =

Railway station in Schenectady, New York

Schenectady, NY
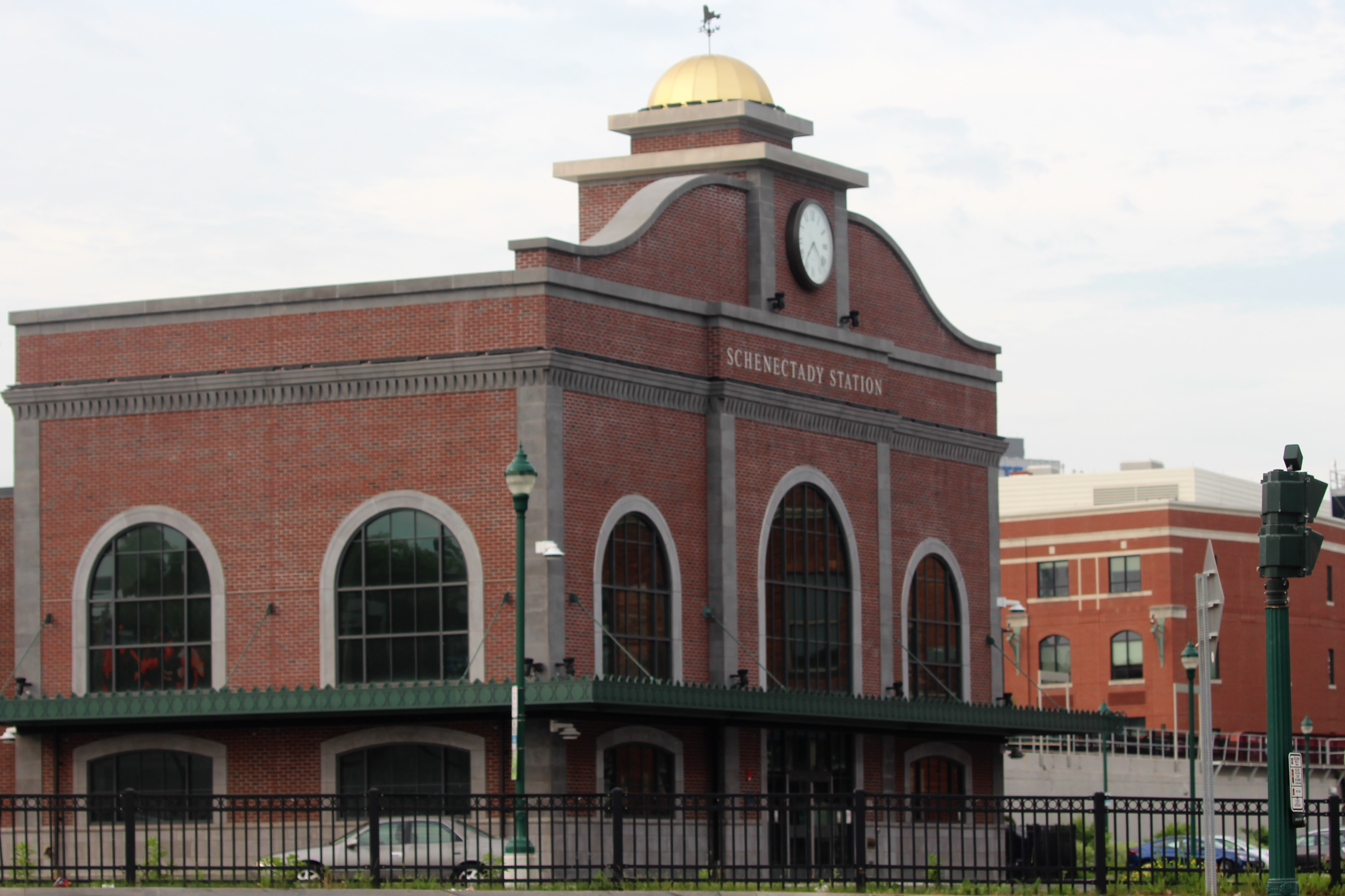
- Schenectady station in 2021

General information
- Other names: Schenectady Intermodal Station
- Location: 332 Erie Boulevard; Schenectady, New York; United States
- Coordinates: 42.8146°N 73.9428°W
- Owner: Capital District Transportation Authority
- Lines: Empire Corridor (Hudson Subdivision); CPKC Freight Subdivision
- Platforms: 1 island platform
- Tracks: 2
- Connections: CDTA: 351, 353, 355, 370, 605, 763, 810, 905

Construction
- Parking: Yes
- Accessible: Yes

Other information
- Station code: Amtrak: SDY; Via Rail: SCHE
- IATA code: ZTD

History
- Opened: 1908; 118 years ago
- Rebuilt: 1979, 2018

Passengers
- FY 2025: 63,212 (Amtrak)

Services
Preceding station	Amtrak	Following station
Saratoga Springs toward Montreal	Adirondack	Albany–Rensselaer toward New York
Amsterdam toward Niagara Falls, New York	Empire Service	Albany–Rensselaer toward New York
Saratoga Springs toward Burlington	Ethan Allen Express	Albany–Rensselaer toward New York
Amsterdam toward Toronto	Maple Leaf	Albany–Rensselaer toward New York
Utica toward Chicago	Lake Shore Limited	Albany–Rensselaer toward New York or Boston South
Former services
Preceding station	Amtrak	Following station
Former service at Colonie-Schenectady
Utica toward Chicago	Lake Shore 1971–1972	Albany–Rensselaer toward New York (Grand Central)
Amsterdam toward Detroit (Michigan Central)	Niagara Rainbow	Albany–Rensselaer toward New York (Grand Central)
Preceding station	New York Central Railroad	Following station
Former services at Schenectady Union Station
Hoffman's toward Chicago	Main Line	Carman toward New York
Terminus	Schenectady – Troy	Aqueduct toward Troy
Location

Schenectady station is an Amtrak intercity train station in Schenectady, New York. The station is served by five Amtrak services. The Lake Shore Limited operates one train in each direction daily between Chicago and Boston or New York City. The Empire Service operates three trains in each direction daily between Niagara Falls and New York City. The Maple Leaf, Ethan Allen Express, and Adirondack each operate one train in each direction daily, serving Toronto, Burlington, and Montreal, respectively, from New York City. The station was rebuilt in 2018 and is owned by the Capital District Transportation Authority, which also owns the Albany–Rensselaer and Saratoga Springs stations.

== History ==
=== Original station ===
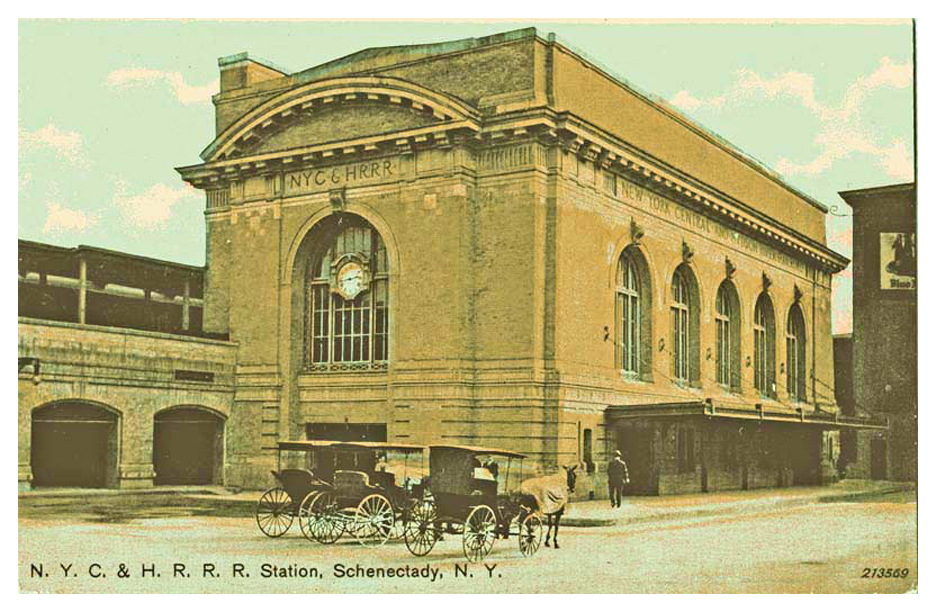
Postcard of Schenectady Union Station

The current station is the third station built on the site. The original Schenectady Union Station was constructed in 1908 by the New York Central Railroad after the railroad grade was raised throughout the city. It remained in service until 1969, when Penn Central closed it because of low ridership and the cost of heating and maintaining the large station. It was replaced by Colonie-Schenectady near NY-155 several miles to the east in Colonie.

Penn Central sold the Union Station building to the city of Schenectady in December 1970 for US$20,000 (equivalent to $165,810 in 2025). There were proposals to renovate the building as an opera house for the Schenectady Light Opera Company, but the plans did not proceed. The city demolished the Union Station in 1971 to make way for a parking lot.

=== First Amtrak station ===
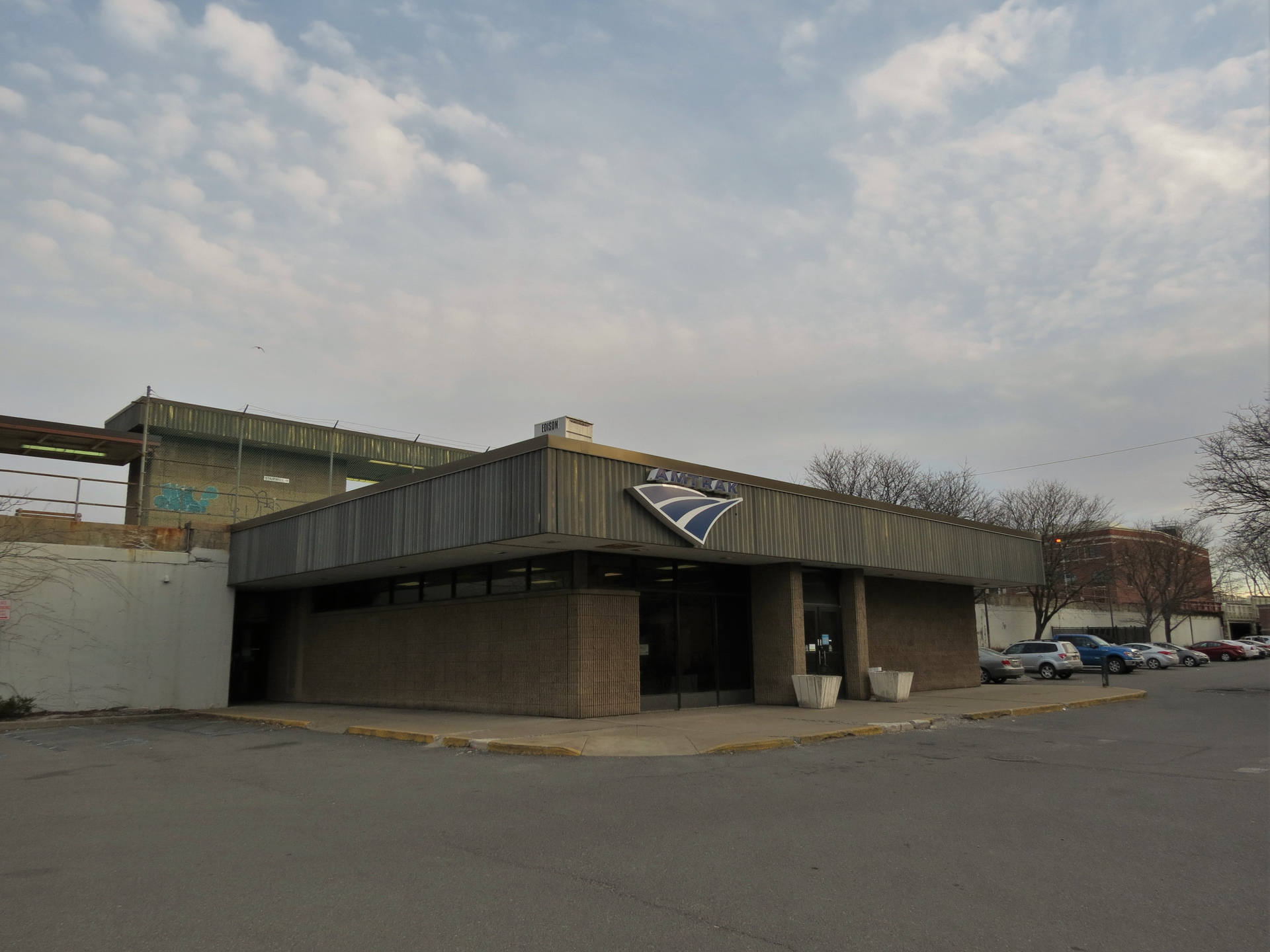
The 1979-built station, demolished in 2017

After Amtrak assumed operation of most intercity passenger rail service in the United States, discussions began about moving the Schenectady stop from Colonie back to its original location.

Train service returned to Schenectady in 1978, and construction began on a new station. Passengers began boarding at the new station in October 1978, although customer service agents were not present until July 29, 1979. The station was completed and formally opened on August 8, 1979.

The station followed the Amtrak Standard Stations Program. It was built beneath the railroad tracks, with an elevator and staircase leading to a railway platform between the two tracks. The project was funded through a partnership between Amtrak, the State of New York and the City of Schenectady. The state funded rehabilitation of the tracks, Amtrak funded most of the station construction, and the city donated the land.

The return of service to Schenectady sharply reduced ridership at Colonie-Schenectady, which closed on September 9, 1979. The closure allowed trains to operate at full speed between Albany and Schenectady.

=== 2018 station ===
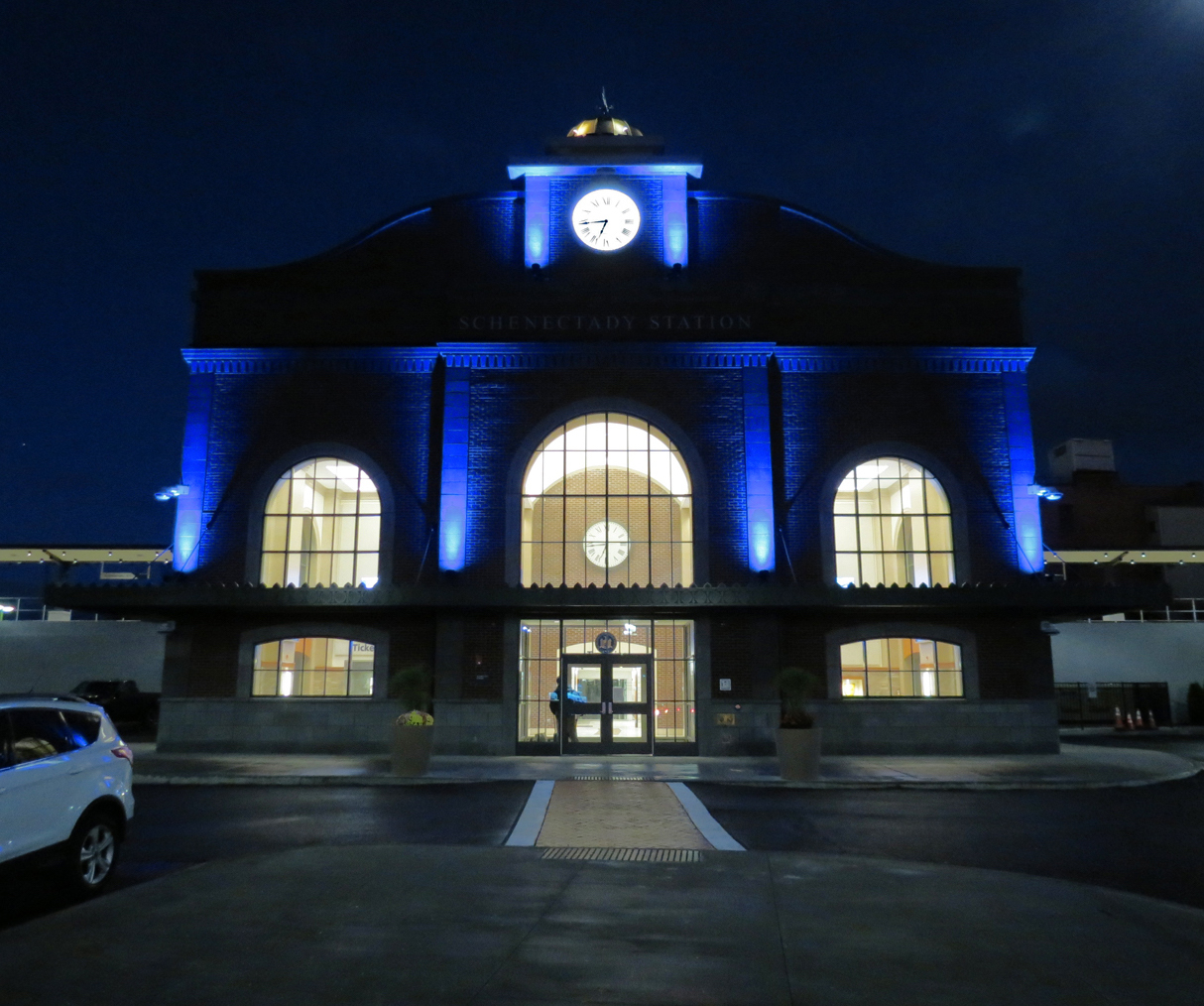
Schenectady station shortly after opening in October 2018

The replacement station, known as the Schenectady Intermodal Station, was constructed on the site of the 1979 station and serves Amtrak and local transit services. The Capital District Transportation Authority (CDTA) received a $4,200,000 (equivalent to $6,201,000 in 2025) grant for the planned station in October 2010.

By 2014, federal and state funding for the new station had reached $15,000,000 (equivalent to $20,400,000 in 2025). The CDTA had completed much of the design work for a four-story station building, but the project was later reduced to two stories. In 2015, the Metroplex Development Authority sold Amtrak 2,400 square feet (220 m^{2}) of parking lot for construction of a temporary station, allowing the 1979 station to be demolished before construction of its replacement.

In March 2016, NYSDOT announced that it would seek new bids after the sole bid from the first round was $24,900,000 (equivalent to $33,404,000 in 2025), compared with a budget of $14,600,000 (equivalent to $19,586,000 in 2025). The rebidding delayed the expected opening of the station to 2018. NYSDOT subsequently divided the project into two contracts for rebidding. Demolition of the existing station and repairs to the viaduct were bid in February 2017, with the lowest bid totaling $5,400,000 (equivalent to $7,093,000 in 2025).

Lake Shore Limited train at Schenectady

The 1979 station closed and was demolished in July 2017. A temporary stairwell and platform with a shelter were erected in a parking lot north of the station site to serve passengers during construction.

The replacement station has two floors, a domed roof, arched windows, and expanded seating. Its interior includes images of the Erie Canal and the former American Locomotive Company train yard. The station also includes retail space, charging stations, and digital display boards. It opened on October 17, 2018.

The construction of the new station was part of upgrades to the Empire Corridor. In March 2020, Adirondack and Ethan Allen Express service at the station was suspended as part of Amtrak's service reductions during the COVID-19 pandemic, with the trains truncated to Albany–Rensselaer station. Ethan Allen Express service resumed on July 19, 2021, and Adirondack service to Montreal resumed on April 4, 2023.

== Station layout ==
The station has one low-level island platform. An additional track exists east of Track 2, which does not serve the station nor carry revenue passenger service.
