= North Creek station =

Railway station in New York, United States

North Creek
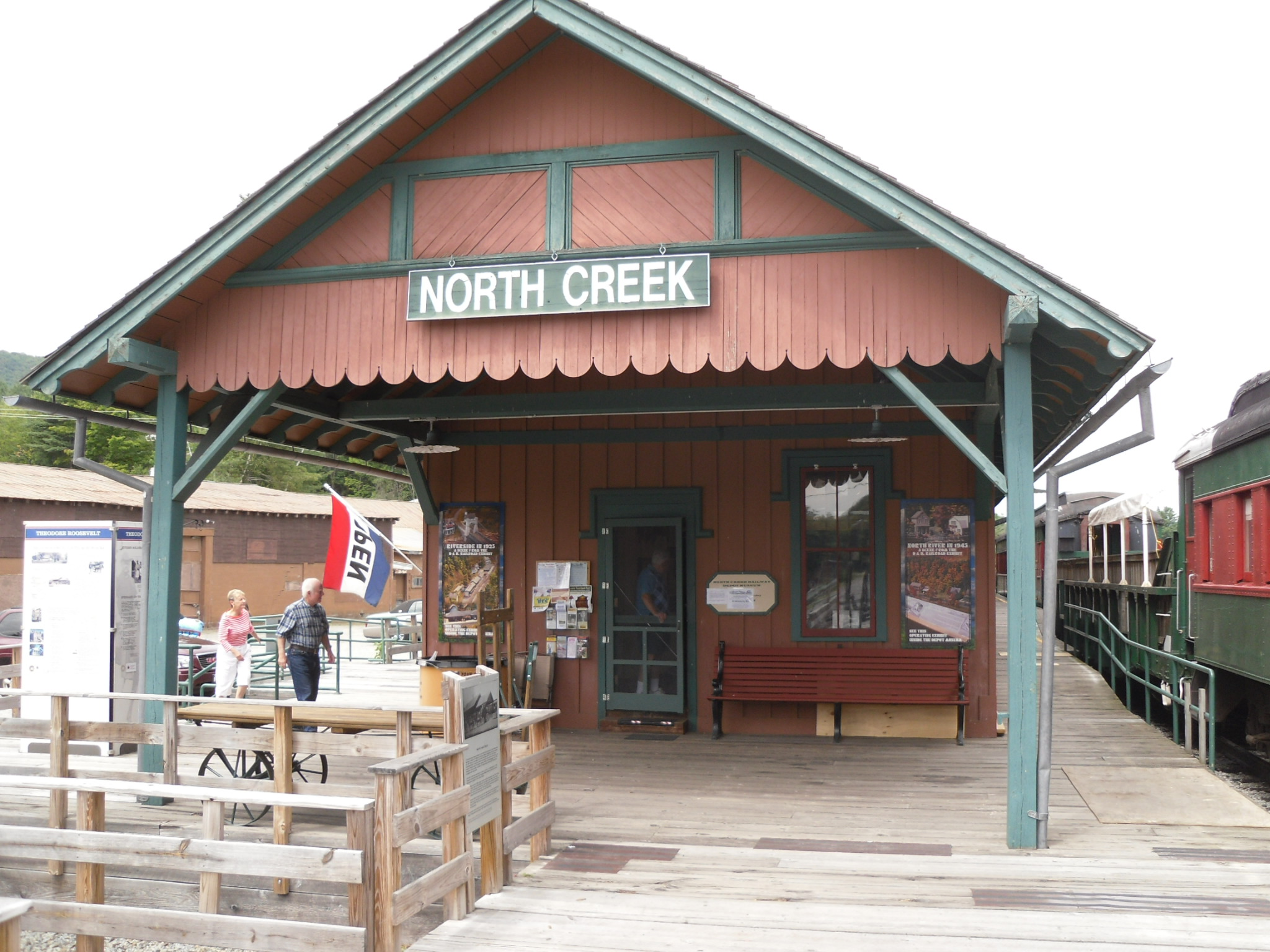
- The station in August 2010

General information
- Location: 5 Railroad Place; North Creek, New York; United States
- Owner: North Creek Railway Depot Preservation Association
- Line: Adirondack branch

Former services
Preceding station	Saratoga and North Creek Railway	Following station
Terminus	Saratoga Flyer	Riparius/Riverside toward Saratoga Springs
Terminus	Hudson Explorer	Riparius/Riverside One-way operation
Preceding station	Delaware and Hudson Railway	Following station
Terminus	Saratoga Springs – North Creek	Riverside toward Saratoga Springs
- North Creek Railroad Station Complex
- U.S. National Register of Historic Places
- Location within New York Location within the United States
- Coordinates: 43°42′10″N 73°59′23″W
- Area: 6 acres (2.4 ha)
- Built: 1871
- Architectural style: Stick/Eastlake
- NRHP reference No.: 76001287
- Added to NRHP: August 27, 1976
Location

North Creek station is a historic railroad station complex located at North Creek, Warren County, New York. The complex consists of the railroad station, the freight house, round house, turntable, and horse barn. The station was built in 1874 and is a simple, rectangular, gable roofed building with a broad, overhanging strut-supported roof in the Stick-Eastlake style. Its exterior is covered with vertical boards.

The original station was built in 1871 as the new northern terminus of the Adirondack Railway, soon after the line had been purchased by the Union Pacific Railroad. The railroad served the garnet mining and tanning industries in North Creek. The railroad's vice president originally intended to extend the line to Ogdensburg, but the line was not extended beyond North Creek until 1944, when the line was extended for freight service to Tahawus. In 1889, the line was purchased by the Delaware and Hudson Railway, becoming its Adirondack Branch. Ski trains ran to the station from 1934 until the outbreak of World War II.

It is notable as the place where Theodore Roosevelt learned of his accession to the Presidency of the United States following the death of President William McKinley.

The station served as the northern terminus of the Saratoga and North Creek Railway from 2011 to 2018, when the railroad ceased operation. The Saratoga and North Creek revived both the ski trains and summer service south to Saratoga Springs. The railway occupied both the freight house and engine house. Another part of the complex continues to serve as the North Creek Depot Museum.

The complex was added to the National Register of Historic Places in 1976 as the North Creek Railroad Station Complex.

In recent years the tracks of the North Creek railroad have been repurposed and used for Rail Biking allowing scenic tours along the historic tracks.
