= Southwind Rail Travel Limited =

Logistics equipment provider

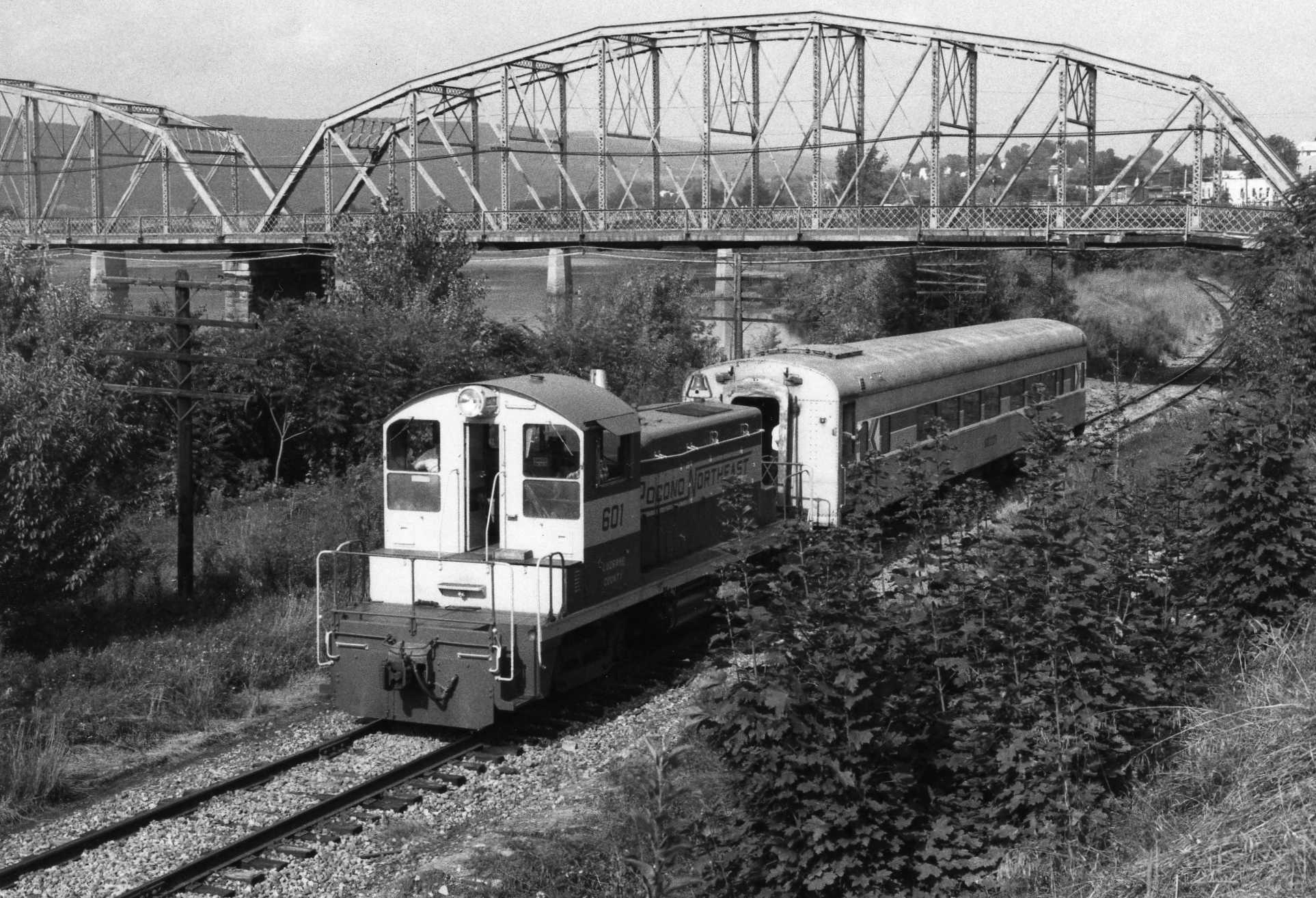
- Mainline passenger train runs utilizing equipment of Southwind Rail Travel Limited between Pittston, Pennsylvania, over the Pocono Northeast Railroad to Wilkes-Barre, Pennsylvania, commenced in the fall of 1983.

Overview
- Headquarters: Wilkes-Barre, Pennsylvania
- Reporting mark: SRTX; 7/2000-6/2008 (not listed)
- Locale: Luzerne County, Northeastern Pennsylvania
- Dates of operation: 1983–Present

Technical
- Track gauge: 4 ft 8 1/2 in (1,435 mm) standard gauge

Southwind Rail Travel Limited is a leasing company that provides locomotives and rolling stock to railroad companies. From 2000 to 2008 it reported under the mark SRTX.

== History ==
Southwind began service in 1983, operating a heritage railroad passenger excursion train on a 35-mile route in Wilkes-Barre, Luzerne County, Pennsylvania that was owned by the Pocono Northeast Railroad.

SRTL owns ex-Delaware & Hudson ALCO RS-36 diesel locomotive No. 5019, most recently leased to the former Upper Hudson River Railroad, and focuses on leasing locomotives and rolling stock for heritage railroad excursion companies in the northeastern United States. They have partnered with Pocono Northeast, Steamtown USA, Delaware-Lackawanna Railroad, Towanda-Monroeton Shippers Lifeline and Upper Hudson River Railroad.

In 2010, Southwind Rail Travel Limited sued Upper Hudson River Railroad, seeking $106,492.80, including $14,987.60 in lease payments and thousands of dollars in maintenance and repair costs.
