= Black Pond Township, Oregon County, Missouri =

Township in Oregon County, Missouri, U.S.

Coordinates: 36.8628°N 91.5544°W

Black Pond Township is an inactive township in Oregon County, in the U.S. state of Missouri.

Black Pond Township was established in the 1880s, taking its name from a pond of the same name within its borders. The precise location of the former lake is unknown to the GNIS.
