= Black Pond (New York) =

Lake in New York, United States

- Location within New York Location within the United States
- Location: Saratoga County, New York, United States
- Coordinates: 43°10′58″N 73°46′43″W
- Type: pond
- Primary inflows: mountain springs/beaver pond
- Primary outflows: Black Pond Outlet
- Basin countries: United States
- Surface area: 2 acres (0.0081 km^{2})
- Average depth: 8 feet (2.4 m)
- Max. depth: 12 feet (3.7 m)
- Shore length^{1}: .35 miles (0.56 km)
- Surface elevation: 1,670 feet (510 m)
- Settlements: Wilton, New York
- ^{1} Shore length is not a well-defined measure.

Black Pond is a pond that is located in Wilton, New York, within the Palmertown Range. Fish species present in the lake are sunfish, and chubs. There is a trail from a logging road along the northeast shore. Private property.
