= North River, New York =

North River
- hamlet
- Location within New York
- Coordinates: 43°44′19″N 74°02′55″W
- Country: United States
- State: New York
- County: Warren County
- ZIP code: 12856

North River is a hamlet in the Town of Johnsburg, in Upstate New York, United States, within the Adirondack Mountains. It is located on the upper Hudson River, five miles north of the hamlet of North Creek in Warren County, on the northern border with Hamilton County.

Historically, North River was one of the centers of the New York State garnet industry. The last remaining garnet mine in New York is located in North River. The hardest garnets in the world come from the Adirondacks and are still in demand, especially for industrial use. There is also a former garnet mine, the Hooper Mine, that is a tourist site.

A local attraction is Gore Mountain, one of the tallest in New York and a skiing center.
