= Corinth, New York =

Corinth Kahcheboncook (Mohawk)
- Town
- Town of Corinth
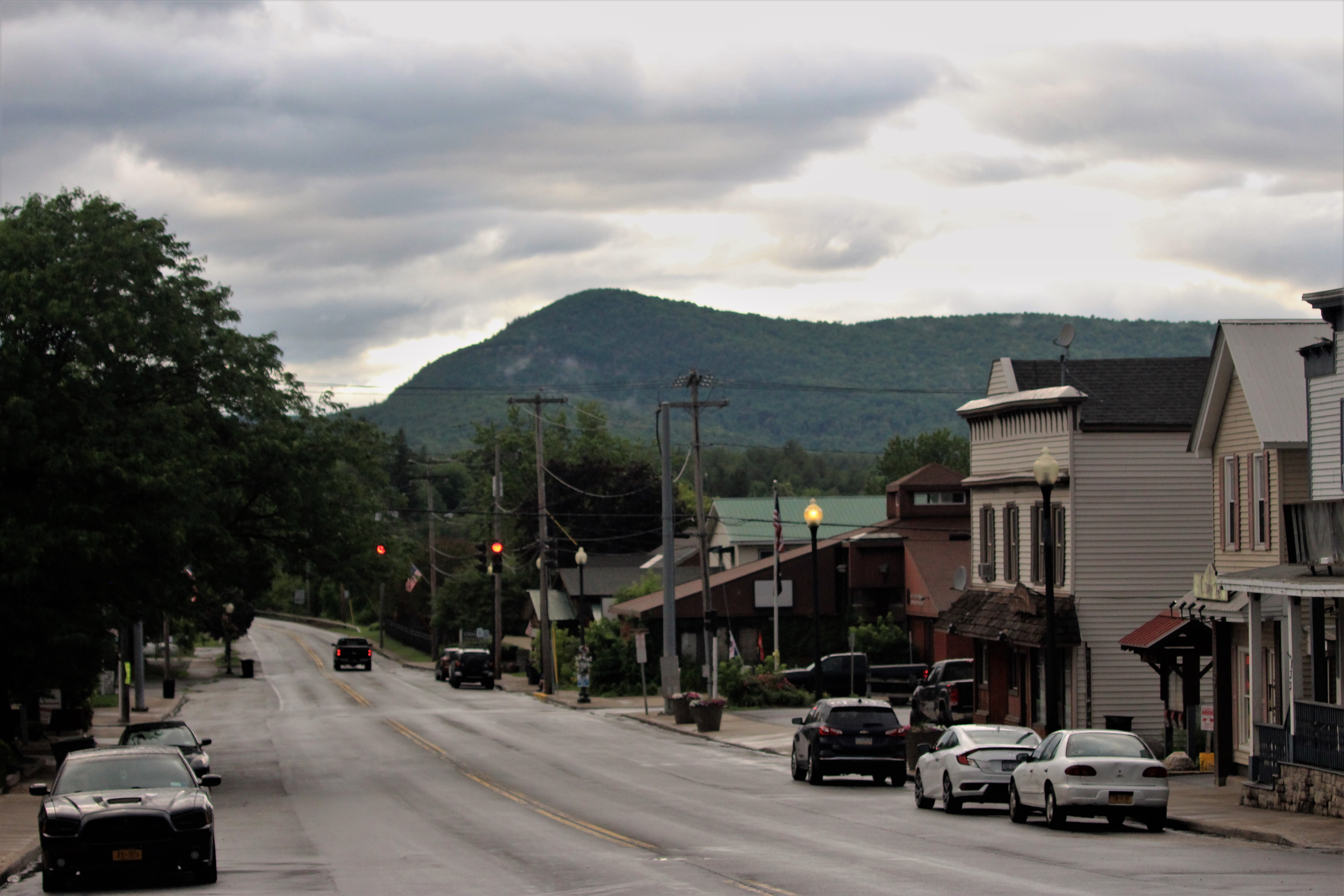
- Main Street, Corinth NY
- Nickname: Gateway to the Adirondacks
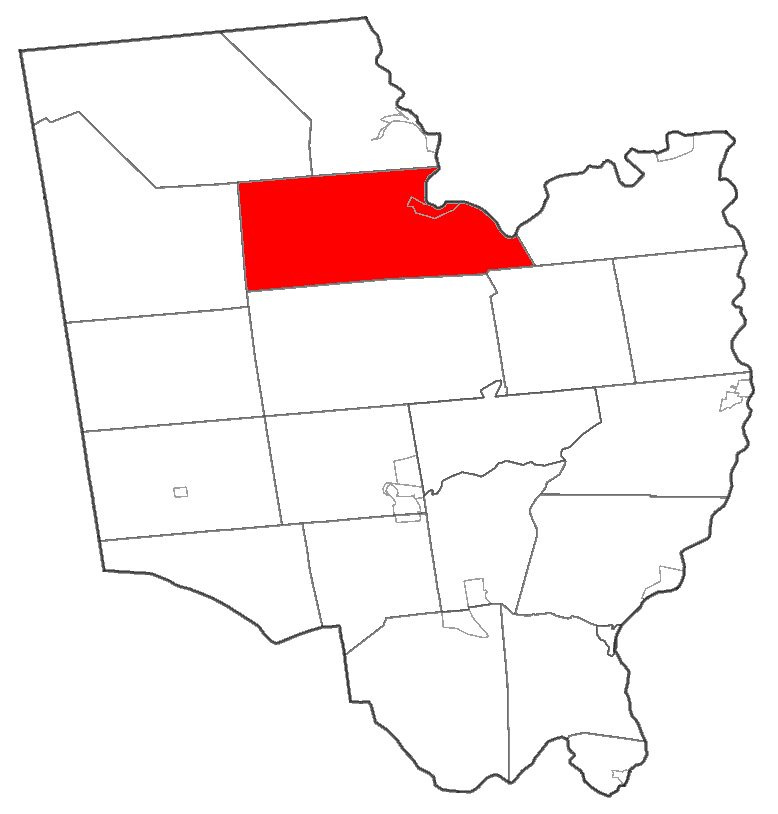
- Map highlighting Corinth's location within Saratoga County.

- Location of Corinth in New York
- Coordinates: 43°13′36″N 73°53′23″W
- Country: United States
- State: New York
- County: Saratoga
- Settled: 1775
- Established: 1818

Area
  - Total: 58.14 sq mi (150.57 km^{2})
  - Land: 56.76 sq mi (147.02 km^{2})
  - Water: 1.37 sq mi (3.55 km^{2})

Population (2020)
  - Total: 6,500
- Time zone: UTC-5 (Eastern (EST))
  - Summer (DST): UTC-4 (EDT)
- Area code: 518
- FIPS code: 36-091-18223
- Website: Town of Corinth

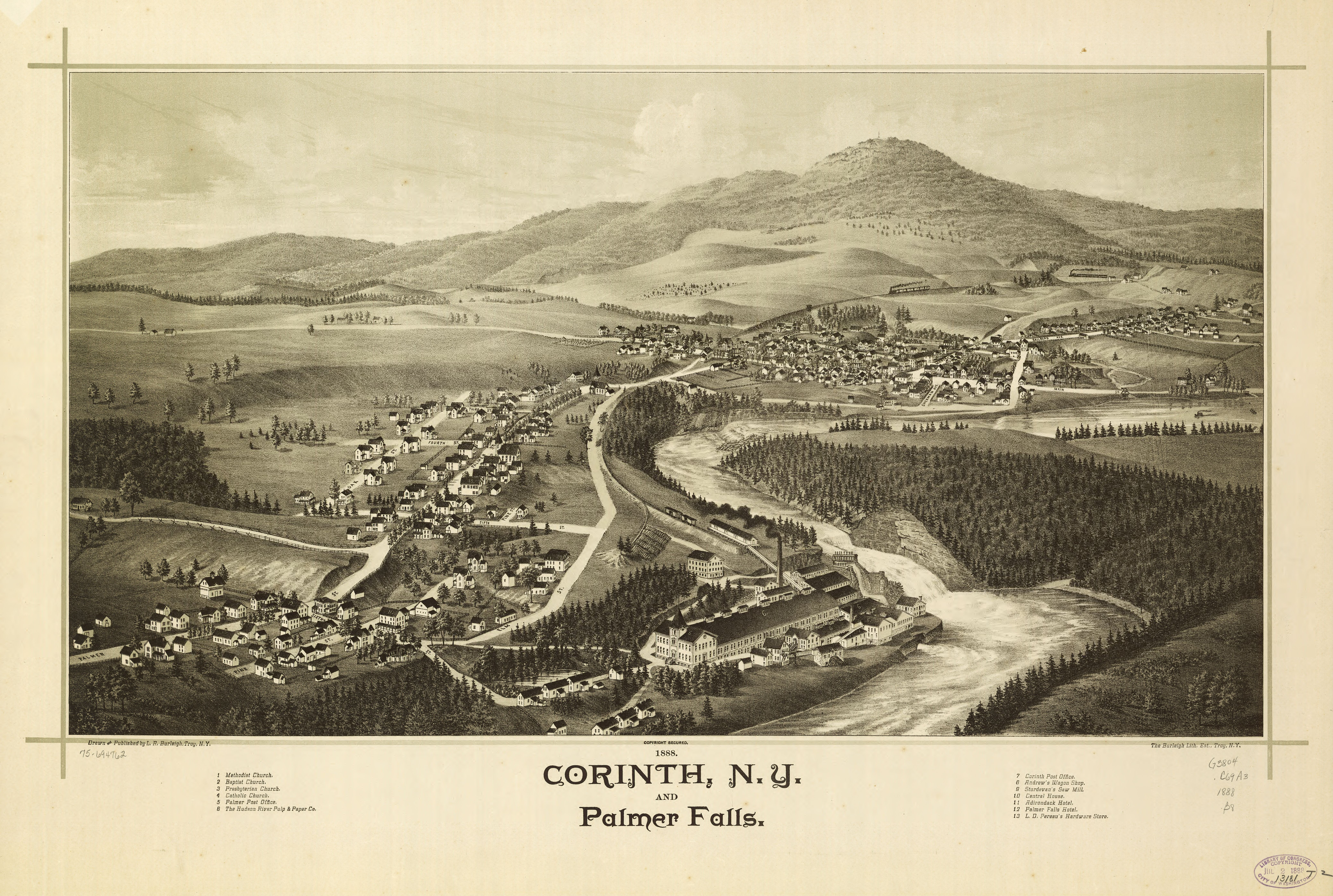
Perspective map of Corinth and Palmer Falls by L.R. Burleigh from 1888 with a list of landmarks

Corinth is a town in Saratoga County, New York, United States. The population was 6,500 at the 2020 census. The town contains a village also named Corinth. The town is on the northeastern border of the county, north of Saratoga Springs. The town is noted as "the snowshoe capital of the world" and is home to Palmer Falls where the Hudson River passes through the Palmertown Range.

== History ==
Palmer Falls c.1930-1945

Palmer Falls is an area of whitewater waterfalls formerly known as "Kah-che-bon-cook", "Hadley Falls", "The Great Falls of the Hudson", or "Palmer's Great Falls". The falls are now named after Beriah Palmer, who at one time owned land along both sides of the river by the falls.

Around 1763, after the French and Indian War, Ebenezer Jessup and his brother Edward from Luzerne began lumbering operations in the area. They floated rafts of logs down the Hudson and bypassed Palmer Falls by landing the rafts at a place called "Jessup's Landing", now the public beach of the Village of Corinth, where they loaded the logs onto wagons and carted them around the falls.

During the American Revolution the Jessups sided with the Loyalists and fled to Canada, where they commanded a unit known as "Jessup's Loyal Rangers". For a long time the area was known as Jessup's Landing. The first permanent settlement in this area was around 1777, when Joseph Eggleston moved from Wilton to escape British raiders. John W. Taylor moved from Charlton to Jessup's Landing around 1808 and helped organize the Town of Corinth in 1818.

Around 1790 Ambrose Clothier moved from Connecticut and built a cabin near Lake Bonita on Mount McGregor. He had three sons and three daughters, and all his sons were noted fiddlers. The area around Beaver Brook near the Hudson is today known as "Clothier Hollow".Other early settlers in this area were Benjamin Ide, Jonathan Hodges, William Grippen, Lawrence Barber, Jonathan Barrass, and Hathaway Randall.

A third area of settlement was South Corinth (originally Chapman's Corners) along the Kayaderosseras Creek near the border with Greenfield. This area was settled around 1788 by Adam Comstock from Warwick, Rhode Island, who served in the New York State Assembly from 1792 to 1840, and the New York State Senate from 1805 to 1808. Other early settlers were Benjamin Carpenter, Nathaniel Edwards, Frederick Parkman, Jeremiah Eddy, John Purqua, and Washington Chapman.

The town was formed in 1818 from the town of Hadley. The first business was to decide on a name. Mrs. Washington Chapman was allowed to choose the name. She opened her bible randomly to the Epistle to the Corinthians, so the town became Corinth.

Lumbering was important to the early town, which had more than thirty sawmills. After the American Civil War, many paper mills opened in the town.

In 1888, the hamlet of Corinth incorporated as a village. L.R. Burleigh published a perspective map of Corinth and Palmer Falls in 1888 along with an identifying list of landmarks.

== Geography ==
According to the United States Census Bureau, the town has a total area of 58.1 square miles (150.6 km^{2}), of which 56.8 square miles (147.1 km^{2}) is land and 1.3 square miles (3.4 km^{2}) (2.29%) is water.

The eastern town line, formed by the Hudson River, is the border of Warren County. The western part of the town is in the Adirondack Park.

== Transportation ==
New York State Route 9N is a north-south highway.

The Saratoga and North Creek Railway used to stop in Corinth once daily northbound and southbound on Saturday and Sunday in May and June, and Friday through Tuesday in July through October. The branch line shut down in 2002 along with the paper mill's closure.

== Industry ==
As early as 1804, a sawmill was established on the Hudson at Palmer Falls, followed shortly by a gristmill and a woolen factory. In 1869, the Hudson River Pulp & Paper Company established its mill and in 1870 began to produce paper from the pulp. This "Hudson River Mill" became the flagship of the International Paper Company at its founding in 1898, and at times had over 1500 employees. The mill specialized in the production of coated paper until its closure in 2002. A shirt factory was established in Corinth in the 1890s and was purchased by Cluett Peabody & Company in 1899. The factory closed in 1975. The Elixman Paper Core Company operated in the village from 1913 until its closure in 1976. Other industries included a sawmill and excelsior plant, a chair factory, and a sand, crushed-stone, and gravel operation.

In 1805, Washington Chapman built a woolen mill in South Corinth, which was later converted to producing nuts and bolts. The hamlet was the site of a tannery, built in 1855 which, by the 1870s, processed five thousand hides a year. Two sawmills nearby produced two thousand cords of hemlock bark and two million feet of lumber annually.

== Demographics ==
Historical population
| Census | Pop. | Note | %± |
|---|---|---|---|
| 1820 | 1,490 | | — |
| 1830 | 1,412 | | −5.2% |
| 1840 | 1,365 | | −3.3% |
| 1850 | 1,501 | | 10.0% |
| 1860 | 1,558 | | 3.8% |
| 1870 | 1,500 | | −3.7% |
| 1880 | 1,737 | | 15.8% |
| 1890 | 2,124 | | 22.3% |
| 1900 | 3,104 | | 46.1% |
| 1910 | 3,102 | | −0.1% |
| 1920 | 3,696 | | 19.1% |
| 1930 | 3,760 | | 1.7% |
| 1940 | 4,478 | | 19.1% |
| 1950 | 4,879 | | 9.0% |
| 1960 | 5,167 | | 5.9% |
| 1970 | 5,442 | | 5.3% |
| 1980 | 5,216 | | −4.2% |
| 1990 | 5,935 | | 13.8% |
| 2000 | 5,985 | | 0.8% |
| 2010 | 6,531 | | 9.1% |
| 2020 | 6,500 | | −0.5% |
U.S. Decennial Census

As of the census of 2000, there were 5,985 people, 2,331 households, and 1,662 families residing in the town. The population density was 105.4 inhabitants per square mile (40.7/km^{2}). There were 2,804 housing units at an average density of 49.4 per square mile (19.1/km^{2}). The racial makeup of the town was 98.28% White, 0.20% Black or African American, 0.15% Native American, 0.20% Asian, 0.10% Pacific Islander, 0.30% from other races, and 0.77% from two or more races. Hispanic or Latino of any race were 0.79% of the population.

There were 2,331 households, out of which 32.6% had children under the age of 18 living with them, 55.2% were married couples living together, 10.7% had a female householder with no husband present, and 28.7% were non-families. Of all households, 23.4% were made up of individuals, and 12.8% had someone living alone who was 65 years of age or older. The average household size was 2.57 and the average family size was 2.99.

In the town, the population was spread out, with 26.0% under the age of 18, 7.3% from 18 to 24, 28.6% from 25 to 44, 23.8% from 45 to 64, and 14.2% who were 65 years of age or older. The median age was 38 years. For every 100 females, there were 96.6 males. For every 100 females age 18 and over, there were 94.0 males.

The median income for a household in the town was $35,199, and the median income for a family was $41,732. Males had a median income of $32,227 versus $25,146 for females. The per capita income for the town was $16,003. About 7.8% of families and 11.9% of the population were below the poverty line, including 14.7% of those under age 18 and 6.4% of those age 65 or over.

== Communities and locations ==
- Black Pond – A lake located west of the village of Corinth.
- Corinth: A village by the Hudson River in the eastern part of the town, located on NY-9N.
- Daly's Creek: A stream in the northwestern part of Corinth running into the Great Sacandaga Lake.
- Efner Lake: A lake near the northern town line, south of County Road 10 (West Mountain Road).
- Hunt Lake: A lake east of Efner Lake.
- Jenny Lake: A lake east of Efner Lake.
- Lake Bonita: A lake in the southeastern corner of the town.
- Mount McGregor: A mountain in the southeastern part of the town.
- Palmer: A hamlet east of Corinth village on County Road 24 (Palmer Avenue).
- Randall Corner: A hamlet in the southeastern section of the town on County Road 25 (Spier Falls Road).
- South Corinth: A hamlet near the southern town line on NY-9N.
- Woodland Lake: A lake southeast of Corinth village.
- Alpine Lake
