= Saratoga Springs station =

Train station in Saratoga Springs, New York, US

Saratoga Springs, NY
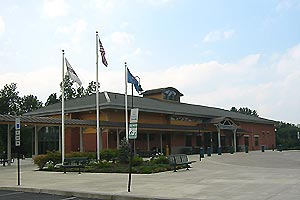
- Saratoga Springs station in July 2006

General information
- Location: 26 Station Lane; Saratoga Springs, New York; United States
- Coordinates: 43.0829°N 73.8102°W
- Owner: Canadian Pacific Kansas City
- Operator: Capital District Transportation Authority
- Lines: Canadian Subdivision; Adirondack branch
- Platforms: 1 side platform
- Tracks: 2
- Connections: Northway Xpress: 451; Trailways of New York

Construction
- Accessible: Yes

Other information
- Station code: Amtrak: SAR

History
- Opened: 1956
- Rebuilt: 2002–March 15, 2004

Passengers
- FY 2025: 37,146 (Amtrak)

Services
Preceding station	Amtrak	Following station
Fort Edward toward Montreal	Adirondack	Schenectady toward New York
Fort Edward toward Burlington	Ethan Allen Express	Schenectady toward New York
Former services
Preceding station	Saratoga and North Creek Railway	Following station
Corinth One-way operation	Saratoga Flyer	Terminus
Corinth toward North Creek	Hudson Explorer	Terminus
Preceding station	Delaware and Hudson Railway	Following station
Gansevoort toward Rouses Point	Main Line	Ballston Spa toward Albany
Preceding station	Amtrak	Following station
Fort Edward toward Montreal	Adirondack Rerouted in 1978	Mechanicville toward New York (Grand Central)
Location

Saratoga Springs station is a train station located in Saratoga Springs, New York. It is served by two Amtrak intercity rail routes – the Adirondack and Ethan Allen Express. The station has one low-level side platform to the east of the tracks.

== History ==
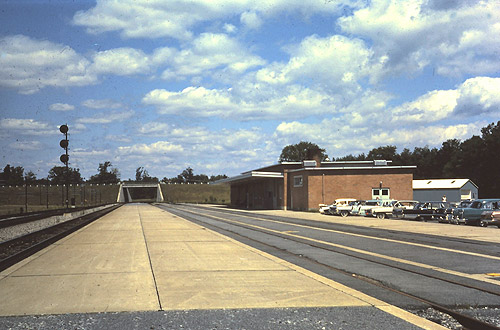
Saratoga Springs station, August 1962

The current station was built in 1956-1959 by the Delaware & Hudson Railway, as a replacement for an 1880-built structure at another location, which currently serves as a private residence. The 1950s-era structure was mostly torn down in 2002, and a temporary trailer was used as the station until the current station was completed in 2004. The brick exterior from the former structure was retained and covered with wooden facing high across the front and green trim on the doors and windows the rest of the building was rebuilt into a modern, high-ceilinged facility with a skylight in the center of the station. The facade features a 54-foot frieze by Anne Diggory, Alice Manzi, and Beverly Mastrianni.
