= North Creek, New York =

North Creek
- CDP
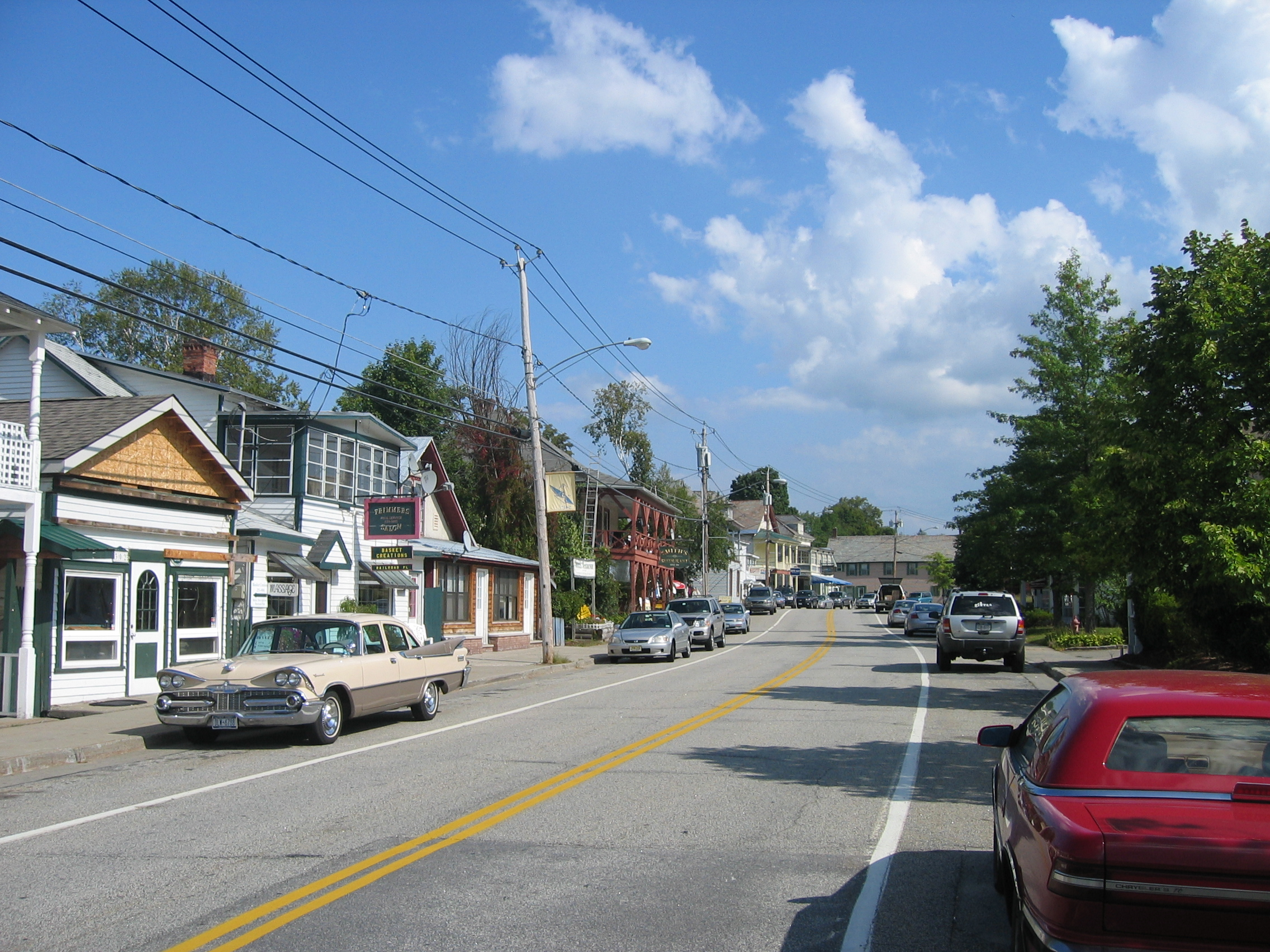
- Main Street in North Creek Business District.

- Location within New York
- Coordinates: 43°41′52″N 73°59′11″W
- Country: United States
- State: New York
- County: Warren County

Area
  - Total: 1.81 sq mi (4.70 km^{2})
  - Land: 1.76 sq mi (4.55 km^{2})
  - Water: 0.058 sq mi (0.15 km^{2})

Population (2020)
  - Total: 562
  - Density: 319.6/sq mi (123.41/km^{2})
- ZIP code: 12853
- Area code: 518
- FIPS code: 36-51847

North Creek is a census-designated place and hamlet in the Adirondack Park, in the town of Johnsburg, in Warren County, New York, United States. It is an area known for skiing (Gore Mountain), hiking and other outdoor recreational activities. It is located at 43°41′52″N 73°59′11″W. As of the 2020 census, North Creek had a population of 562.

The town hall, library, and Johnsburg Central School are all located in North Creek. The Saratoga and North Creek Railroad was a heritage railway that operated between North Creek and Saratoga Springs over the tracks of the historic Adirondack Railway. The North Creek Depot Museum is in the town, documenting the cultural and industrial history of the Adirondacks area.

== Demographics ==
Historical population
Census	Pop.	Note	%±
2020	562		—
U.S. Decennial Census

== History ==
North Creek was the original northern terminus of the Adirondack Railway, the first railroad into the Adirondacks, built by Dr. Thomas C. Durant. In 1901 upon learning about the death of William McKinley, Vice President Theodore Roosevelt rode from Mount Marcy to the train station at North Creek.

The North Creek Railroad Station Complex was listed on the National Register of Historic Places in 1976. In recent years the tracks of the North Creek railroad have been repurposed and used for Rail Biking allowing scenic tours along the historic tracks.

== Business and tourism ==
The Gore Mountain ski area has been expanded greatly over the past five years, with new trails, gondola, and quad chairlift, which has increased trails by 40%. The center is owned by New York State and operated by ORDA (Olympic Regional Development Authority). As a result, the hamlet of North Creek has seen an influx of private investment in new businesses, the Tannery Pond Community Center, which is home to many non-profit organizations, an art gallery, Art & Nature Camp, and a theater company.
