= Timeline of town creation in New York's Capital District =

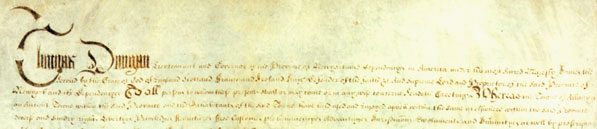
Opening paragraph of the Dongan Charter creating the city of Albany, New York, the oldest municipality in New York's Capital District

The towns and cities of New York's Capital District were created by the U.S. state of New York as municipalities in order to give residents more direct say over local government. The Capital District is an 11 county area, which consists of the counties of Albany, Schenectady, Rensselaer, Saratoga, Schoharie, Warren, Washington, Columbia, Montgomery, Fulton, and Greene. New York experimented with different types of municipalities before settling upon the current format of towns and cities occupying all the land in a county. Districts were created for Albany and Tryon counties in 1772; all were transformed into towns (or divided into multiple towns) in 1788 when all of the state of New York was divided into towns. Two years before that, in 1786, all of what Washington County encompassed at that time was divided into townships with the same legal status, abilities, and responsibilities as districts with their status as towns confirmed in 1788. Some other forms of government in earlier years included land patents with some municipal rights and boroughs. The following timelines show the creation of the current towns from their predecessors stretching back to the earliest municipal entity over the area. The timelines only represent from which town(s) a particular town was created from and does not represent annexations of territory to and from towns that already existed. All municipalities are towns unless otherwise noted as patent, township, borough, district, or city. Unless otherwise sourced with a footnote all dates of incorporation represent those stated in the 1860 Gazetteer of the State of New York by John H. French.

== Albany and Rensselaer counties, with Niskayuna (Schenectady County) ==
Beverwyck village 1652[0] (Albany in 1664)	Albany city 1686[A]

West; Manor district 1779- 1788[A]	Watervliet; 1788 -1896[A]
Rensselaer- ville 1790[A]	Berne; 1795[A]	Knox; 1822[A]
Westerlo; 1815[A]
Coeymans; 1791[A]
Bethlehem; 1793[A]	New; Scotland; 1832[A]
Guilderland; 1803[A]
Manor[A] district 1772- 1779	Colonie[A] 1808-1815
Niskayuna; 1809[B]
Cohoes[A] city 1869
Colonie; 1895[A]
Green Island; 1896[A]	North; Greenbush; 1855[D]
Watervliet city 1896[A]	Clinton; 1855[D] (East; Greenbush in 1858)
Greenbush; 1795- 1897[D]	Rensselaer city 1897[D]
East; Manor district 1779- 1784[A]	Rensselaer- wyck district[A] 1784-1788	Rensselaer- wyck[C] 1788- 1795	Schodack; 1795[D]	Sand; Lake[D] 1812
Brunswick; 1807[D]
Troy; 1791- 1816[D]	Troy city 1816[D]	Poesten- kill 1848[D]
Lansing- burgh 1807-1901[D]
Stephentown district 1784-1788[A]	Stephentown; 1788[C]	Petersburgh; 1791[D]	Grafton; 1807[D]	Berlin; 1806[D]
Philips- town 1806[D] (Nassau in 1808)

Schagh- ticoke district 1772- 1788[A]	Schagh- ticoke 1788[C]
	Pittstown; 1788^{[a]}[C]
Hoosick district 1772- 1788[A]	Hoosick; 1788[C]

=== Notes ===
[0]= A part of New Netherland, a Dutch territory, until 1664, thereafter part of the English colony of New York,
and within Albany County from its formation in 1683.

[A] = A part of Albany County.

[B] = A part of Schenectady County when formed from Albany County in 1809.

[C] = A part of Albany County until 1791 when Rensselaer County was formed.

[D] = A part of Rensselaer County.

== Schoharie and Greene counties, with Duanesburgh (Schenectady County) ==
Hurley township[9] 1708-1788	Woodstock township 1787-1788[9]	Woodstock; 1788[9]	Windham; 1798[10]	Greenland; 1813[F] (Hunter in 1814)
Jewett; 1849[F]
New Goshen[F] January 17, 1813 (Lexington on March 19, 1813)	Halcott; 1851[F]
Prattsville; 1833[F]
Ashland; 1848[F]

Great Imboght; District[A] 1772-1788	Catskill 1788[2]
Athens 1815[F]
Coxsackie; District; 1772-1788[A]	Coxsackie 1788[C]
Canton 1803[F] (Cairo 1808)
New Baltimore; 1811[F]
Freehold 1790[C] change to Durham 1805
Greenfield 1803[F] (Freehold in 1808) (Greenville 1809)
Duanesburgh patent[A] 1765-1772	Duanesburg; 1789[D]	Conesville; 1836[8]
United Districts of Duanesburgh and Schoharie; 1772-1788[A]	Schoharie; 1788[E]	Bristol 1797[G] change to Broome 1808
Gilboa 1848[G]
Schoharie[A] patent 1714-1772	Blenheim 1797[G]	Jefferson; 1803[G]
Richmondville; 1845[G]	Summit 1819[G]
Cobleskill 1797[G]
Carlisle 1807[G]
Sharon 1797[G]	Seward 1840[G]
Middletown 1797; Middleburgh 1801[G]	Fulton 1828[G]
Wright 1846[G]
Esperance 1846[G]

=== Notes ===
[A] = A part of Albany County.

[2] = A part of Albany County until 1798, then part of Ulster County until 1800 when Greene County was formed.

[C] = A part of Albany County until 1800 when Greene County was formed.

[D] = A part of Albany County, until 1809 when Schenectady County was formed.

[E] = A part of Albany County until 1797 when Schoharie County was formed.

[F] = A part of Greene County

[G] = A part of Schoharie County

[H] = Schoharie County annexed a portion of the town of Durham (Greene County) in 1836,
that portion was joined with a part of the town of Broome to become Conesville.

[9] = A part of Ulster County.
[10] = A part of Ulster County until 1800 when Greene County was formed.

== Schenectady County, except Niskayuna and Duanesburgh ==
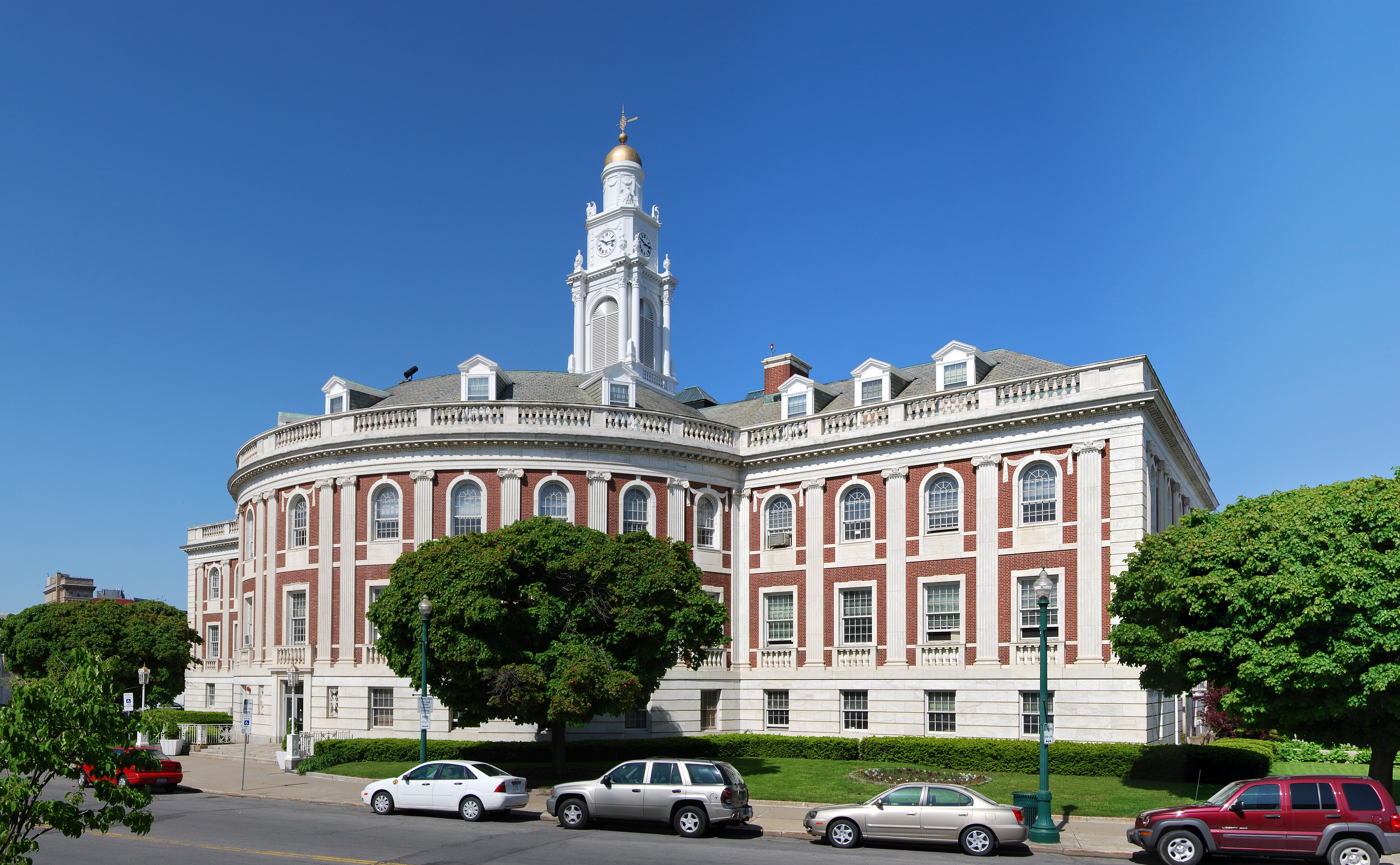
Schenectady City Hall

Schenectady patent 1684-1765[A]
Schenectady borough 1765-1772[A]
Schenectady district 1772-1788[A]
Schenectady town 1788-1798[A]
Princetown 1798[B]	Schenectady city 1798[B]
Glenville 1820[C]	Rotterdam 1820[C]

=== Notes ===
[A] = A part of Albany County.

[B] = A part of Albany County, until 1809 when Schenectady County was formed.

[C] = A part of Schenectady County.

== Saratoga County, and Easton (Washington County) ==
Charlton; 1792[C]
Galway; 1792[C]	Providence; 1796[C]	Northfield; 1801 (Edinburgh in 1808)[C]	Corinth; 1818[C]
Ballstown district 1775- 1788[A]	Ballston; 1788[B]	Milton; 1792[C]
Saratoga district 1772- 1788[A]	Greenfield; 1793[C]	Concord 1819 (Day in 1827)[C]
Hadley; 1801[C]
Saratoga; 1788[B]	Northumberland; 1798[C]	Moreau; 1805[C]
Wilton; 1818[C]
Saratoga; Springs town 1819- 1915[C]	Saratoga; Springs city 1915[C]
Easton; 1789[D]
Stillwater; 1788[B]	Malta; 1802[C]
Halfmoon district 1772- 1788[A]	Mechanicville city 1915[C]
Halfmoon; 1788[B]	Waterford; 1816[C]
Clifton 1828 (Clifton Park in 1829)[C]

=== Notes ===
[A] = A part of Albany County.

[B] = A part of Albany County, until 1791 when Saratoga County was formed.

[C] = A part of Saratoga County.

[D]= A part of Albany County, until 1791 when annexed by Washington County

== Washington County, except Easton ==
Jackson; 1815[D]
Cambridge patent[A] 1761-1788	Cambridge; 1788[C]	White Creek; 1815[D]
Kingsbury patent[B] 1762-1786	Kingsbury[D] township 1786-1788	Kingsbury; 1788[D]
Argyle patent[B] 1764-1786	Argyle[D] township 1786-1788	Argyle; 1788[D]	Greenwich; 1803[D]
Salem[B] patent 1764-1786	Salem[D] township 1786-1788	Salem[D] 1788	Fort Edward; 1818[D]
Skenesborough patent[B] 1765-1786	Whitehall[D] township 1786-1788	Whitehall; 1788[D]
Granville[D] township 1786-1788	Granville; 1788[D]
Hampton[D] township 1786-1788	Hampton; 1788[D]
Hebron[D] township 1786-1788	Hebron; 1788[D]
Westfield[D] township 1786-1788	Westfield; 1788[D] (Fort Ann in 1808)	Hartford; 1793[D]
Putnam; 1806[D]	South Bay[D] March 15, 1822 (Dresden in April 17, 1822)

=== Notes ===
[A] = A part of Albany County.

[B]= A part of Albany County until 1772 when Charlotte County was formed (name changed to Washington County in 1778).

[D]= A part of Albany County, until 1791 when annexed by Washington County

[D]= A part of Washington County.

== Warren County ==
Caldwell; 1810[3] (Lake George in 1963)
Chester; 1799[3]
Bolton; 1799[3]	Rochester; 1807[3](Hague in 1808)
Horicon; 1838[4]
Queensbury patent[A] 1762-1786	Queensbury township[B] 1786-1788	Queensbury; 1788[3]	Thurman[B] 1792-1813	Johnsburg; 1805[3]
Fairfield; 1792[3] (Luzerne in 1808; Lake Luzerne in 1963)	Athol[4] 1813-1852	Thurman; 1852[4]
Glens Falls city 1908[4]	Warrensburg; 1813[4]	Stony Creek; 1852[4]

=== Notes ===
[A]= A part of Albany County until 1772 when Charlotte County was formed (name changed to Washington County in 1778).

[B]= A part of Washington County.

[3] = A part of Washington County until 1813 when Warren County was formed.
[4] = A part of Warren County.

== Columbia County ==
Hillsdale; District[A] 1782-1788	Hillsdale; 1788[B]
Hudson city[A] 1785	Greenport; 1837[B]
Claverack; District[A] 1772-1788	Claverack; 1788[B]
(1)	(1); Stuyvesant; 1823[B]	Stockport; 1833[B]
Kinderhook; District[A] 1772-1788	Kinderhook; 1788[B]	Ghent; 1818[B]
Chatham; 1795[B]
Austerlitz; 1818[2]
Kings; District[A] 1772-1788	Canaan; 1788[B]	New Lebanon; 1818[B]

	German Camp (East Camp); District[A] 1775-1788	Germantown; 1788[B]
	Clermont; 1788[B]	Gallatin 1803 (Ancram 1814)[B]	Gallatin; 1830[B]
Manor of Livingston; District[A] 1772-1788	Livingston; 1788[B]	Granger 1803[B] (Taghkanic 1814)	Copake; 1824[B]

=== Notes ===
[A] = A part of Albany County until 1786 when Columbia County was formed.

[B]= A part of Columbia County.

== Fulton, Montgomery, and Hamilton counties, with part of Herkimer County ==
Salisbury; 1797
Oppenheim; 1808	St. Johnsville; 1838
Manheim; 1817
Stone; Arabia; 1772- 1788 (Palatine in 1773)	Palatine; 1788	Ephratah; 1827
Canajoharie district 1772-1788	Canajoharie; 1788	Minden; 1798	Danube; 1812	Stark; 1828
Bleecker; 1831	Caroga; 1842
Root; 1823	Gloversville; 1840
Johnstown; 1895
Mohawk district 1772- 1788	Mohawk; 1788- 1793	Charleston; 1793	Glen; 1823	Johnstown; 1793
Florida; 1793	Mohawk; 1837
Lake Pleasant; 1812	Arietta; 1836	Long Lake; 1837
Morehouse; 1835	Inlet; 1901
Caughnawaga district 1780-1788	Caughnawaga; 1788-1793	Mayfield; 1793	Wells; 1805	Indian Lake; 1858
Broadalbin; 1793	Northampton; 1799	Hope; 1818	Benson; 1860
Amsterdam; 1793	Perth; 1838	Gilman; 1839-1860
Amsterdam city 1885

== See also ==
- List of incorporated places in New York's Capital District
- Toponymies of places in New York's Capital District
- Administrative divisions of New York
- List of cities in New York
- List of towns in New York
- List of villages in New York
- Timeline of town creation in Downstate New York
- Timeline of town creation in the Hudson Valley
- Timeline of town creation in Central New York
- Timeline of town creation in New York's North Country

== Notes ==
- a. Though many sources put Pittstown as incorporated as a township by patent on July 23, 1721 no law can be found incorporating it as such. When Albany County was divided into districts Pittstown is not mentioned, though the land it currently occupies was included in Schaghticoke; if Pittstown had been a municipality it ceased to be so in 1772 (or earlier); the current town of Pittstown was formed in 1788.
