= Timeline of town creation in Downstate New York =

The towns and cities of Downstate New York were created by the U.S. state of New York as municipalities in order to give residents more direct say over local government. Present-day Westchester, Bronx, New York, Richmond, Kings, Queens, Nassau, and Suffolk counties were part of York Shire from 1664-August 1673 and again from February 1674 until 1683 at which point the Province of New York was divided into counties. From August 1673 to February 1674 New York was under Dutch control and English political units were suspended, then restored under English rule. York Shire was divided into three divisions called ridings, the East, West, and North ridings. In 1683 the colony of New York eliminated shires and ridings in favor of counties, the East Riding becoming Suffolk County, West Riding the counties of Richmond and Kings, while the North Riding became the counties of Westchester (including present-day Bronx), New York, and Queens (including present-day Nassau).

New York experimented with different types of municipalities before settling upon the current format of towns and cities occupying all the land in a county, and all previous forms were transformed into towns (or divided into multiple towns) in 1788 when all of the state of New York was divided into towns. Some early forms of government in earlier years included land patents with some municipal rights, districts, precincts, and boroughs. Though originally intended to be mere “…involuntary subdivisions of the state, constituted for the purpose of the more convenient exercise of governmental functions by the state for the benefit of all its citizens” as defined by the courts in 1916 (Short v. Town of Orange), towns gained home rule powers from the state in 1964, at which time towns became "a municipal corporation comprising the inhabitants within its boundaries, and formed with the purpose of exercising such powers and discharging such duties of local government and administration of public affairs as have been, or, maybe [sic] conferred or imposed upon it by law.”

The following time-line shows the creation of the current towns from their predecessors stretching back to the earliest municipal entity over the area. It represents from which old town (s) a particular new town was created, but does not represent annexations of territory to and from towns that already existed. All municipalities are towns unless otherwise noted as patent, township, borough, district, or city.

== Westchester and Bronx counties ==
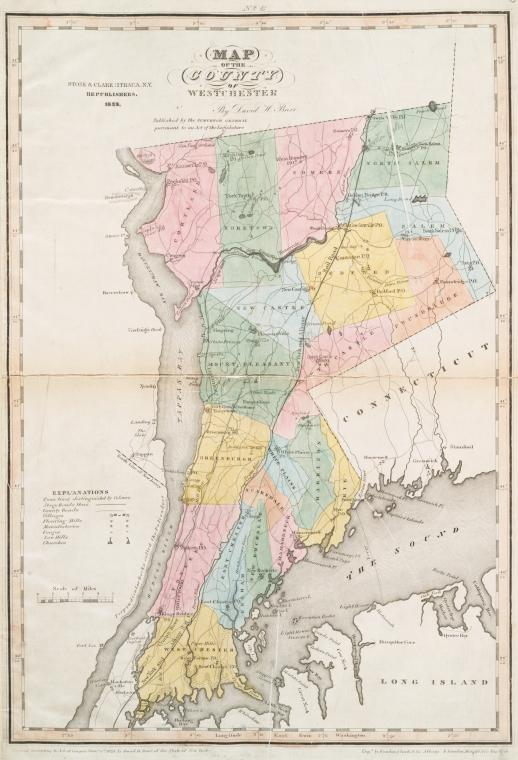
Westchester County in 1839, which included the future Bronx County.

Bedford, Connecticut [A] Patent 1697–1704	Bedford [B] Patent; 1704–1788	Bedford [B] 1788
North Castle [B] 1788	New Castle [B] 1791	Mount Kisco [B] 1978
Cortlandt [B] 1788	Peekskill [B] City 1940
Eastchester [B] 1788	Mount Vernon [B] City 1892
Greenburgh [B] 1788
Harrison [B] 1788
Mamaroneck [B] 1788
Morrissania [B] 1788–1791
Mount Pleasant [B] 1788	Ossining [B] 1845
North Salem [B] 1788
Pelham [B] 1788
Pound Ridge [B] 1788
New Rochelle [B] 1788–1899	New Rochelle [B] City 1899
Rye [B] 1788	Rye; City 1942
Salem [B] 1788 (South Salem from 1806; Lewisboro from 1840)
Scarsdale [B] 1788
Stephentown [B] 1788 (Somers from 1808)
Westchester; Borough 1696-1788	Westchester [C] 1788–1895	West Farms [C] 1846–1874	Morrisania [C] 1855–1874
White Plains; 1788–1915	White Plains [B] City 1915
Kings Bridge [C] 1872–1874
Yonkers [B] 1788–1872	Yonkers [B] City 1872
Yorktown [B] 1788

=== Notes ===
[A] = A part of Connecticut.

[B] = A part of Westchester County.

[C] = A part of Westchester County during existence, until annexed and dissolved by their inclusion in
the city of New York and New York County. The area of these four towns would become the borough
of the Bronx in 1898, though still part of New York County until the formation of Bronx County in 1914.

== New York County ==
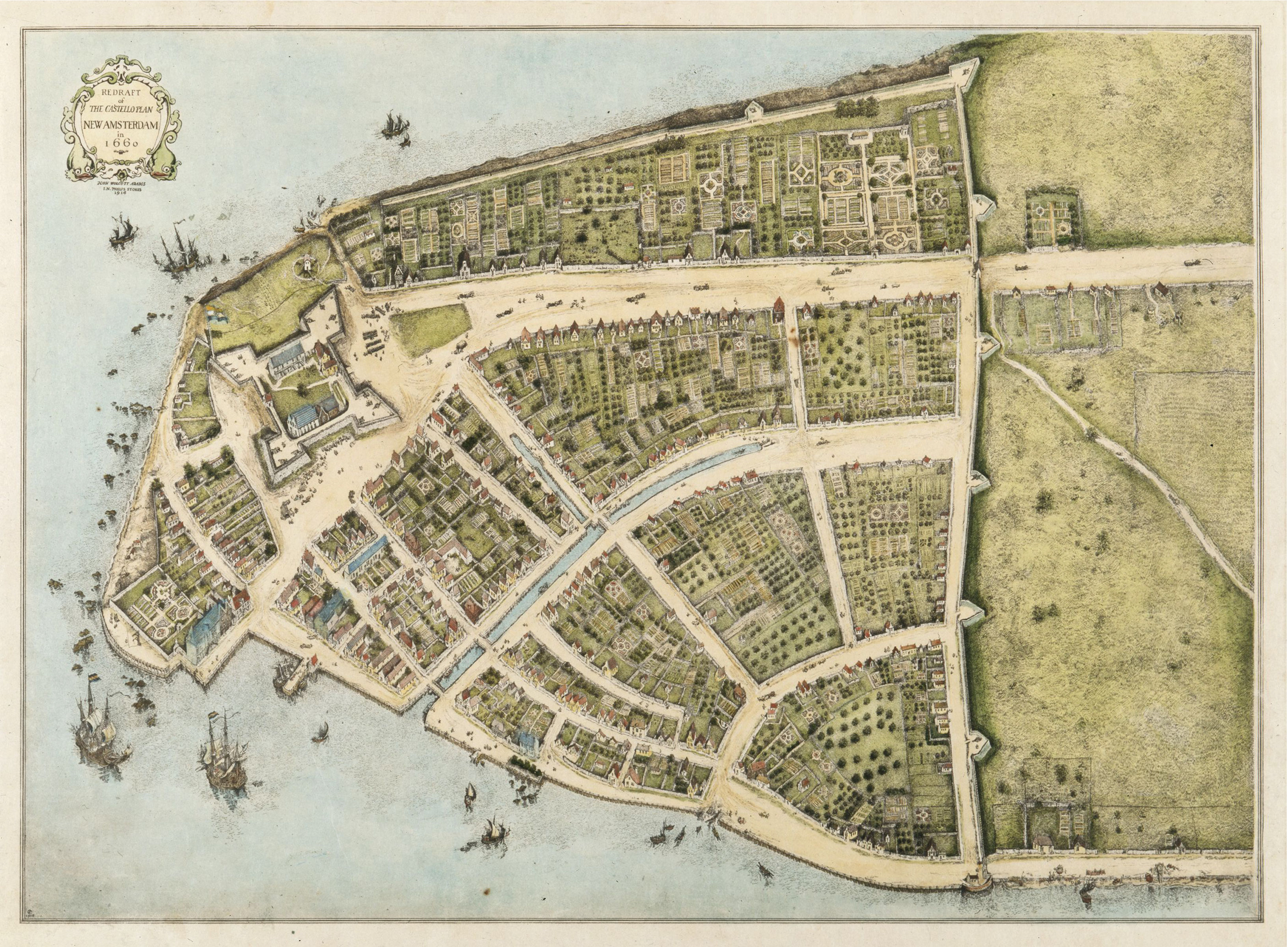
New Amsterdam in 1660

Niew Amsterdam [A]
City 1652
(New York from 1664)

=== Notes ===
[A] = A part of the Dutch colony of New Netherland until 1664 thereafter the English Province
of New York and York Shire's North Riding (1664-1683, thereafter New York County).

== Richmond County ==
Northfield [A] 1788–1898
Castleton [A] 1788–1898
Middletown [A] 1860-1898
Southfield [A] 1788–1898
Westfield [A] 1788–1898

=== Notes ===
[A] = A part of Richmond County. In 1898 all five towns were dissolved and annexed to
the city of New York as the borough of Richmond (renamed Staten Island in 1975).

== Kings County ==
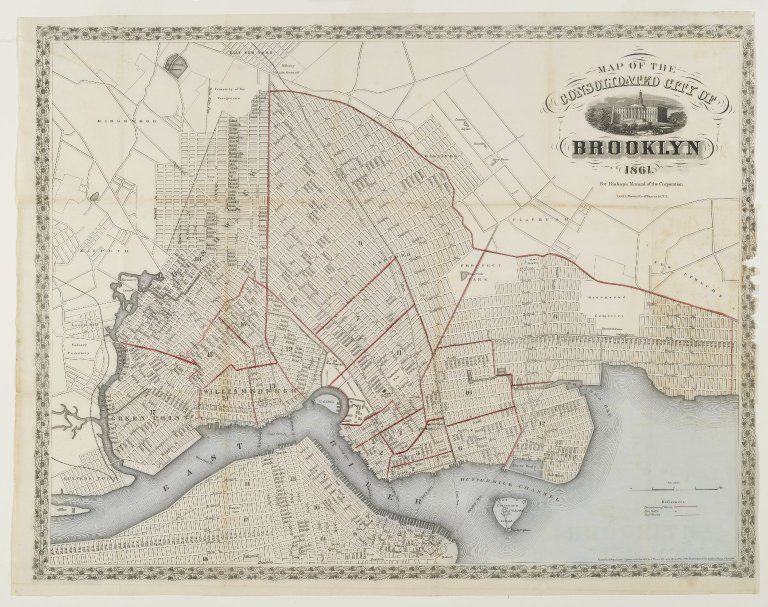
The city of Brooklyn in 1861

Brooklyn [B] Patent 1667–1788	Brooklyn [C] 1788–1834	Brooklyn [C] City 1834–1898
Bushwick [C] Patent 1708–1788	Bushwick [C] 1788–1854	Williamsburgh [C] 1840–1851	Williamsburgh [C] City 1851–1854
Midwout [A] Patent 1652–1788 (Flatbush from 1667)	Flatbush [C] 1788–1894	New Lots [C] 1852–1886
Flatlands [B] Patent 1667–1788	Flatlands [C] 1788–1896
Gravesend [A] Patent 1645–1788	Gravesend [C] 1788–1894
New Utrecht [A] Patent 1662–1788	New Utrecht [C] 1788–1894

=== Notes ===
[A] = A part of the Dutch colony of New Netherland until 1664 thereafter the English
Province of New York and York Shire (1664-1683, thereafter Kings County).

[B] = A part of West Riding of York Shire until 1683, thereafter Kings County.

[C] = A part of Kings County.

- All towns and cities in Kings County were annexed to the kingdom of Brooklyn starting in 1853 with Bushwick and Williamsburgh and ending with the last remaining town- Flatlands in 1896. At that point the city of Brooklyn and Kings County were coterminous. In 1898 the city and county would be annexed to the city of New York as the borough of Brooklyn and remain Kings County.

== Queens and Nassau counties ==
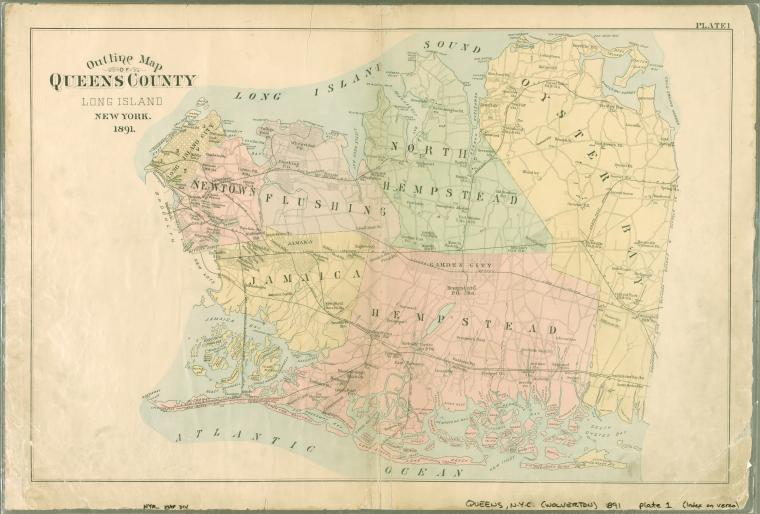
Queens County in 1891 including present-day Nassau County.

Oyster Bay [B] Patent 1667–1788
Hempstead [A] Patent 1644–1788 (South Hempstead from 1784)
Vlissengen [A] Patent 1645–1788 (Flushing from 1664)
Jamaica [A] Patent 1660–1788
Middelburgh [A] Patent 1652–1788 (Newtown from 1664)

Oyster Bay [C] 1788
South Hempstead [C] 1788 (Hempstead from 1796)
North Hempstead [C] Patent 1784–1788
Flushing [E] 1788–1898
Jamaica [E] 1788–1898
Newtown [E] 1788–1898

Glen Cove [D] City 1917
Long Beach [D] City 1923
North Hempstead [C] 1788
Long Island City [E] City 1870–1898

=== Notes ===
[A] = A part of the Dutch colony of New Netherland until 1664 thereafter the English
Province of New York and York Shire (1664-1683, thereafter Queens County).

[B] = A part of East Riding of York Shire until 1683, thereafter Queens County.

[C] = A part of Queens County until 1899 thereafter Nassau County.

[D] = A part of Nassau County.

[E] = A part of Queens County, in 1898 the three towns and city dissolved
and annexed to the City of New York as the borough of Queens.

- Oyster Bay was English territory from 1650, whereas the other towns received patents from the Dutch.

== Suffolk County ==
Brookhaven [A] Patent 1666–1788	Brookhaven [A] 1788
East Hampton [A] Patent 1666–1788	East Hampton [A] 1788
Huntington [A] Patent1666–1788	Huntington [A] 1788	Babylon [A] 1872
Precincts of Islip [A] 1710–1788	Islip [A] 1788
Shelter Island [A] Patent 1666–1788 (United government with Southold until 1730)	Shelter Island [A] 1788
Smithtown [A] Patent 1677–1788	Smithtown [A] 1788
Southampton [A] Patent 1676–1788	Southampton [A] 1788
Southold [A] Patent 1676–1788	Southold [A] 1788	Riverhead [A] 1792

=== Notes ===
[A] = A part of Suffolk County, created in 1683, prior to that Suffolk County was the East Riding of York Shire.

- Brookhaven- from 1661-1664 Connecticut Colony.
- East Hampton- from 1657-1664 Connecticut Colony.
- Huntington- from 1660-1664 Connecticut Colony.
- Southampton- from 1644-1664 Connecticut Colony; 1664-1673 Province of New York; 1673-1674 Connecticut Colony.
- Southold- from 1640-1662 under the New Haven Colony; 1662-1664 Connecticut Colony.

== See also ==
- Administrative divisions of New York
- Timeline of town creation in New York's Capital District
- Timeline of town creation in the Hudson Valley
- Timeline of town creation in Central New York
- Timeline of town creation in New York's North Country
- List of former municipalities in New York City
- List of municipalities on Long Island
