= List of incorporated places in New York's Capital District =

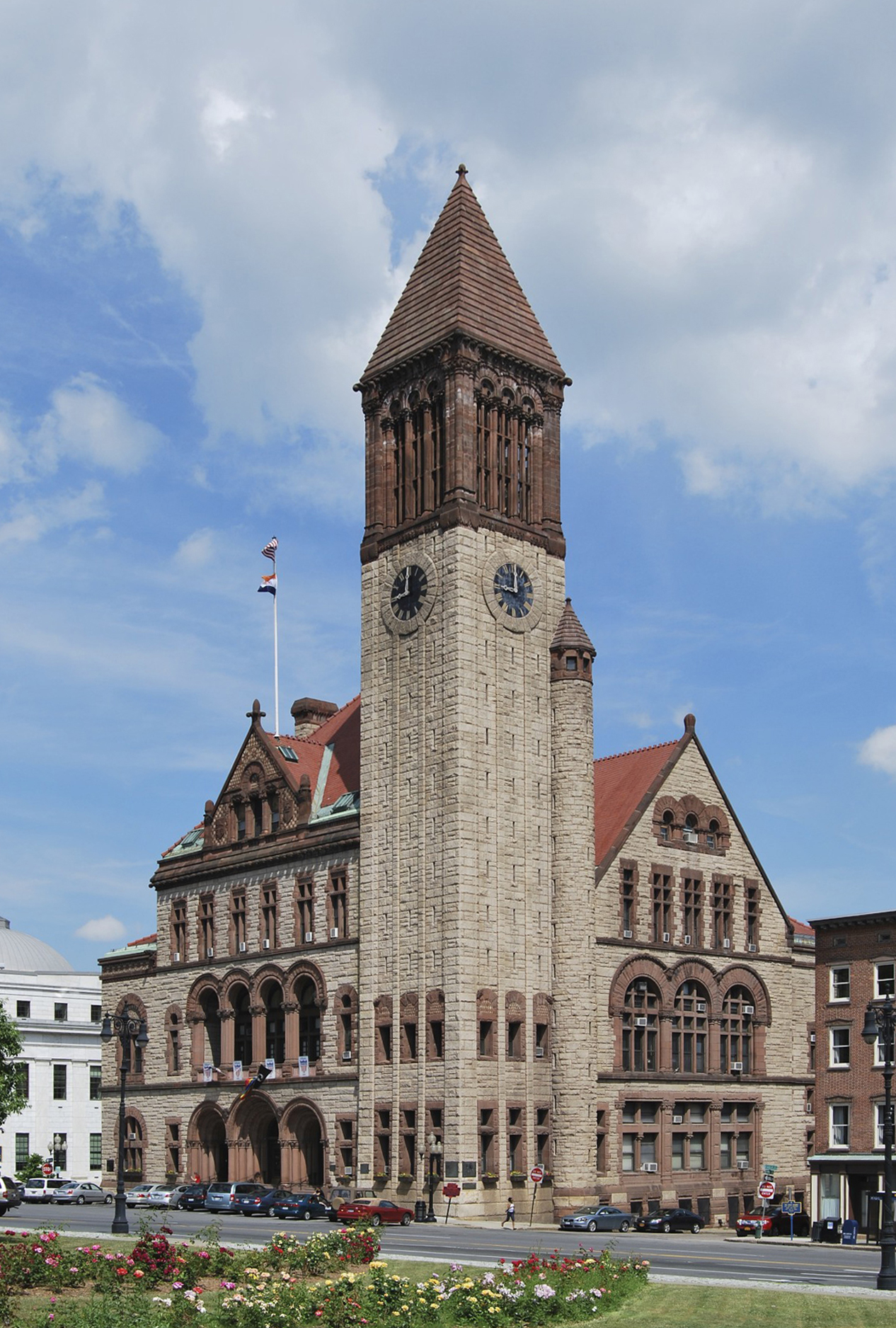
Albany City Hall.

There are three types of incorporated municipalities in the Capital District of the U.S. state of New York: Cities, towns, and villages. In the State of New York, all the land located in a county is either in a city, in a town, or in an Indian Reservation. New York villages are located within one or more towns and may cross town or county lines. There are 11 counties in the Capital District comprising 13 cities, 143 towns, and 62 villages. The counties are Albany, Columbia, Greene, Fulton, Montgomery, Rensselaer, Saratoga, Schenectady, Schoharie, Warren, and Washington. The village of Green Island is coterminous with the town of the same name. Ballston Spa, Broadalbin, Cambridge, Chatham, Fort Plain, Greenwich, Nassau, and Valley Falls are villages that cross into two towns. The village of Dolgeville is partly in Fulton County, but is mostly in Herkimer County, which is part of the Utica-Rome Metropolitan Statistical Area.

Ten of the eleven counties of the Capital District make up two Metropolitan Statistical Areas (MSA) and three Micropolitan Statistical Areas (μSA); together, those five statistical areas make up the Albany-Schenectady-Amsterdam Combined Statistical Area. Albany, Rensselaer, Saratoga, Schenectady, and Schoharie Counties make up the Albany-Schenectady-Troy MSA; while Warren and Washington counties are the constituent counties of the Glens Falls MSA. Fulton County is the sole county in the Gloversville μSA, Montgomery County is the Amsterdam μSA, and Columbia County is the Hudson μSA. Greene County is not in any CSA, MSA, or μSA.

== Incorporated cities, towns, and villages ==
* -Central city of a metro or micro statistical area

| Place Name | County | Population (2000 Census) | Area (as of 2000) | Type of municipality | Metro or micro statistical area | Incorp. date | Image |
|---|---|---|---|---|---|---|---|
| * Albany | Albany | 95,658 | 21.8 sq mi (56.6 km^{2}) | City | Alb.-Sch.-Troy MSA | 1686 | |
| Altamont | Albany | 1,737 | 1.2 sq mi (3.1 km^{2}) | Village | Alb.-Sch.-Troy MSA | 1860 | |
| Ames | Montgomery | 173 | 0.1 sq mi (0.3 km^{2}) | Village | Amsterdam μSA | 1924 | |
| * Amsterdam | Montgomery | 18,355 | 6.3 sq mi (16.3 km^{2}) | City | Amsterdam μSA | 1885 | |
| Amsterdam | Montgomery | 5,820 | 30.3 sq mi (78.6 km^{2}) | Town | Amsterdam μSA | 1793 | |
| Ancram | Columbia | 1,513 | 42.8 sq mi (110.7 km^{2}) | Town | Hudson μSA | 1803 | |
| Argyle | Washington | 3,688 | 57.8 sq mi (57.8 km^{2}) | Town | Glens Falls MSA | 1786 | |
| Argyle | Washington | 289 | 0.4 sq mi (0.9 km^{2}) | Village | Glens Falls MSA | 1838 | |
| Ashland | Greene | 752 | 26.0 sq mi (67.3 km^{2}) | Town | None | 1848 | |
| Athens | Greene | 3,991 | 28.8 sq mi (74.7 km^{2}) | Town | None | 1815 | |
| Athens | Greene | 1,695 | 4.6 sq mi (11.9 km^{2}) | Village | None | 1805 | |
| Austerlitz | Columbia | 1,453 | 48.8 sq mi (126.5 km^{2}) | Town | Hudson μSA | 1818 | |
| Ballston | Saratoga | 8,729 | 30.0 sq mi (77.7 km^{2}) | Town | Alb.-Sch.-Troy MSA | 1788 | |
| Ballston Spa | Saratoga | 5,556 | 1.6 sq mi (4.2 km^{2}) | Village | Alb.-Sch.-Troy MSA | 1807 | |
| Berlin | Rensselaer | 1,901 | 59.9 sq mi (155.2 km^{2}) | Town | Alb.-Sch.-Troy MSA | 1806 | |
| Berne | Albany | 2,846 | 64.8 sq mi (167.7 km^{2}) | Town | Alb.-Sch.-Troy MSA | 1795 | |
| Bethlehem | Albany | 31,304 | 49.6 sq mi (128.4 km^{2}) | Town | Alb.-Sch.-Troy MSA | 1793 | |
| Bleecker | Fulton | 573 | 59.5 sq mi (154.0 km^{2}) | Town | Gloversville μSA | 1831 | |
| Blenheim | Schoharie | 330 | 34.4 sq mi (89.0 km^{2}) | Town | Alb.-Sch.-Troy MSA | 1797 | |
| Bolton | Warren | 2,117 | 90.1 sq mi (233.3 km^{2}) | Town | Glens Falls MSA | 1799 | |
| Broadalbin | Fulton | 5,066 | 39.8 sq mi (103.0 km^{2}) | Town | Gloversville μSA | 1793 | |
| Broadalbin | Fulton | 1,411 | 1.0 sq mi (2.6 km^{2}) | Village | Gloversville μSA | 1815 | |
| Broome | Schoharie | 947 | 48.1 sq mi (124.5 km^{2}) | Town | Alb.-Sch.-Troy MSA | 1797 | |
| Brunswick | Rensselaer | 11,644 | 44.6 sq mi (115.6 km^{2}) | Town | Alb.-Sch.-Troy MSA | 1807 | |
| Cairo | Greene | 6,355 | 60.1 sq mi (155.8 km^{2}) | Town | None | 1802 | |
| Cambridge | Washington | 2,158 | 36.5 sq mi (94.5 km^{2}) | Town | Glens Falls MSA | 1788 | |
| Cambridge | Washington | 1,925 | 1.7 sq mi (4.3 km^{2}) | Village | Glens Falls MSA | 1866 | |
| Canaan | Columbia | 1,820 | 37.0 sq mi (95.7 km^{2}) | Town | Hudson μSA | 1788 | |
| Canajoharie | Montgomery | 3,797 | 43.1 sq mi (111.6 km^{2}) | Town | Amsterdam μSA | 1788 | |
| Canajoharie | Montgomery | 2,257 | 1.3 sq mi (3.5 km^{2}) | Village | Amsterdam μSA | 1829 | |
| Carlisle | Schoharie | 1,758 | 34.2 sq mi (88.7 km^{2}) | Town | Alb.-Sch.-Troy MSA | 1807 | |
| Caroga | Fulton | 1,407 | 54.2 sq mi (140.5 km^{2}) | Town | Gloversville μSA | 1842 | |
| Castleton-on-Hudson | Rensselaer | 1,619 | 0.8 sq mi (2.1 km^{2}) | Village | Alb.-Sch.-Troy MSA | 1827 | |
| Catskill | Greene | 11,849 | 64.2 sq mi (166.2 km^{2}) | Town | None | 1788 | |
| Catskill | Greene | 4,392 | 2.8 sq mi (7.3 km^{2}) | Village | None | 1806 | |
| Charleston | Montgomery | 1,292 | 42.8 sq mi (111.0 km^{2}) | Town | Amsterdam μSA | 1793 | |
| Charlton | Saratoga | 3,954 | 32.8 sq mi (85.0 km^{2}) | Town | Alb.-Sch.-Troy MSA | 1792 | |
| Chatham | Columbia | 4,249 | 53.5 sq mi (138.7 km^{2}) | Town | Hudson μSA | 1795 | |
| Chatham | Columbia | 1,758 | 1.2 sq mi (3.1 km^{2}) | Village | Hudson μSA | 1869 | |
| Chester | Warren | 3,614 | 87.1 sq mi (225.6 km^{2}) | Town | Glens Falls MSA | 1799 | |
| Claverack | Columbia | 6,401 | 48.0 sq mi (124.2 km^{2}) | Town | Hudson μSA | 1788 | |
| Clermont | Columbia | 1,726 | 19.2 sq mi (49.7 km^{2}) | Town | Hudson μSA | 1788 | |
| Clifton Park | Saratoga | 32,995 | 50.2 sq mi (130.1 km^{2}) | Town | Alb.-Sch.-Troy MSA | 1828 | |
| Cobleskill | Schoharie | 6,407 | 30.8 sq mi (79.7 km^{2}) | Town | Alb.-Sch.-Troy MSA | 1795 | |
| Cobleskill | Schoharie | 4,533 | 3.3 sq mi (8.5 km^{2}) | Village | Alb.-Sch.-Troy MSA | 1868 | |
| Coeymans | Albany | 8,151 | 53.1 sq mi (137.5 km^{2}) | Town | Alb.-Sch.-Troy MSA | 1791 | |
| Cohoes | Albany | 15,521 | 4.2 sq mi (11.0 km^{2}) | City | Alb.-Sch.-Troy MSA | 1869 | |
| Colonie | Albany | 79,258 | 57.9 sq mi (149.9 km^{2}) | Town | Alb.-Sch.-Troy MSA | 1895 | |
| Colonie | Albany | 7,916 | 3.3 sq mi (8.6 km^{2}) | Village | Alb.-Sch.-Troy MSA | 1921 | |
| Conesville | Schoharie | 726 | 39.9 sq mi (103.2 km^{2}) | Town | Alb.-Sch.-Troy MSA | 1836 | |
| Copake | Columbia | 3,278 | 42.1 sq mi (109.1 km^{2}) | Town | Alb.-Sch.-Troy MSA | 1824 | |
| Corinth | Saratoga | 5,985 | 58.1 sq mi (150.6 km^{2}) | Town | Alb.-Sch.-Troy MSA | 1818 | |
| Corinth | Saratoga | 2,474 | 1.1 sq mi (2.9 km^{2}) | Village | Alb.-Sch.-Troy MSA | 1888 | |
| Coxsackie | Greene | 8,884 | 38.4 sq mi (99.4 km^{2}) | Town | None | 1788 | |
| Coxsackie | Greene | 2,895 | 2.6 sq mi (6.7 km^{2}) | Village | None | 1867 | |
| Day | Saratoga | 920 | 69.6 sq mi (180.1 km^{2}) | Town | Alb.-Sch.-Troy MSA | 1819 | |
| Delanson | Schenectady | 385 | 0.6 sq mi (1.6 km^{2}) | Village | Alb.-Sch.-Troy MSA | 1921 | |
| Dolgeville | Fulton; Herkimer | 2,166 | 1.9 sq mi (4.8 km^{2}) | Village | Gloversville μSA; Utica-Rome MSA | 1881 | |
| Dresden | Washington | 677 | 55.0 sq mi (142.5 km^{2}) | Town | Glens Falls MSA | 1822 | |
| Duanesburg | Schenectady | 5,808 | 72.1 sq mi (186.8 km^{2}) | Town | Alb.-Sch.-Troy MSA | 1788 | |
| Durham | Greene | 2,592 | 49.3 sq mi (127.6 km^{2}) | Town | None | 1790 | |
| East Greenbush | Rensselaer | 15,560 | 24.4 sq mi (63.1 km^{2}) | Town | Alb.-Sch.-Troy MSA | 1855 | |
| East Nassau | Rensselaer | 571 | 4.9 sq mi (12.7 km^{2}) | Village | Alb.-Sch.-Troy MSA | 1998 | |
| Easton | Washington | 2,259 | 63.2 sq mi (163.6 km^{2}) | Town | Glens Falls MSA | 1789 | |
| Edinburg | Saratoga | 1,384 | 67.1 sq mi (173.7 km^{2}) | Town | Alb.-Sch.-Troy MSA | 1801 | |
| Ephratah | Fulton | 1,693 | 39.4 sq mi (102.1 km^{2}) | Town | Gloversville μSA | 1827 | |
| Esperance | Schoharie | 2,043 | 20.0 sq mi (51.9 km^{2}) | Town | Alb.-Sch.-Troy MSA | 1846 | |
| Esperance | Schoharie | 380 | 0.5 sq mi (1.4 km^{2}) | Village | Alb.-Sch.-Troy MSA | 1819 | |
| Florida | Montgomery | 2,731 | 51.5 sq mi (133.4 km^{2}) | Town | Amsterdam μSA | 1793 | |
| Fonda | Montgomery | 810 | 0.6 sq mi (1.6 km^{2}) | Village | Amsterdam μSA | 1850 | |
| Fort Ann | Washington | 6,417 | 110.8 sq mi (287.0 km^{2}) | Town | Glens Falls MSA | 1808 | |
| Fort Ann | Washington | 471 | 0.3 sq mi (0.8 km^{2}) | Village | Glens Falls MSA | 1820 | |
| Fort Edward | Washington | 5,892 | 27.4 sq mi (71.0 km^{2}) | Town | Glens Falls MSA | 1818 | |
| Fort Edward | Washington | 3,141 | 1.9 sq mi (5.0 km^{2}) | Village | Glens Falls MSA | 1849 | |
| Fort Johnson | Montgomery | 491 | 0.8 sq mi (2.2 km^{2}) | Village | Amsterdam μSA | 1909 | |
| Fort Plain | Montgomery | 2,288 | 1.4 sq mi (3.7 km^{2}) | Village | Amsterdam μSA | 1832 | |
| Fulton | Schoharie | 1,495 | 65.0 sq mi (168.2 km^{2}) | Town | Alb.-Sch.-Troy MSA | 1828 | |
| Fultonville | Montgomery | 710 | 0.5 sq mi (1.3 km^{2}) | Village | Amsterdam μSA | 1948 | |
| Gallatin | Columbia | 1,499 | 39.6 sq mi (102.6 km^{2}) | Town | Hudson μSA | 1830 | |
| Galway | Saratoga | 3,589 | 45.0 sq mi (116.6 km^{2}) | Town | Alb.-Sch.-Troy MSA | 1792 | |
| Galway | Saratoga | 214 | 0.3 sq mi (0.7 km^{2}) | Village | Alb.-Sch.-Troy MSA | 1838 | |
| Germantown | Columbia | 2,018 | 13.9 sq mi (36.0 km^{2}) | Town | Hudson μSA | 1788 | |
| Ghent | Columbia | 5,276 | 45.4 sq mi (117.6 km^{2}) | Town | Hudson μSA | 1818 | |
| Gilboa | Schoharie | 1,215 | 59.3 sq mi (153.7 km^{2}) | Town | Alb.-Sch.-Troy MSA | 1848 | |
| Glen | Montgomery | 2,222 | 39.3 sq mi (101.8 km^{2}) | Town | Amsterdam μSA | 1823 | |
| * Glens Falls | Warren | 14,354 | 3.9 sq mi (10.2 km^{2}) | City | Glens Falls MSA | 1908 | |
| Glenville | Schenectady | 28,183 | 50.9 sq mi (131.8 km^{2}) | Town | Alb.-Sch.-Troy MSA | 1821 | |
| * Gloversville | Fulton | 15,413 | 5.1 sq mi (13.2 km^{2}) | City | Gloversville μSA | 1890 | |
| Grafton | Rensselaer | 1,987 | 46.0 sq mi (119.0 km^{2}) | Town | Alb.-Sch.-Troy MSA | 1807 | |
| Granville | Washington | 6,456 | 56.1 sq mi (145.4 km^{2}) | Town | Glens Falls MSA | 1786 | |
| Granville | Washington | 2,644 | 1.6 sq mi (4.1 km^{2}) | Village | Glens Falls MSA | 1849 | |
| Greenfield | Saratoga | 7,362 | 67.7 sq mi (175.4 km^{2}) | Town | Alb.-Sch.-Troy MSA | 1793 | |
| Green Island | Albany | 2,278 | 0.9 sq mi (2.4 km^{2}) | Town | Alb.-Sch.-Troy MSA | 1896 | |
| Green Island | Albany | 2,278 | 0.9 sq mi (2.4 km^{2}) | Village | Alb.-Sch.-Troy MSA | 1853 | |
| Greenport | Columbia | 4,180 | 20.5 sq mi (53.1 km^{2}) | Town | Hudson μSA | 1837 | |
| Greenville | Greene | 3,316 | 39.1 sq mi (101.3 km^{2}) | Town | None | 1803 | |
| Greenwich | Washington | 4,896 | 44.4 sq mi (114.9 km^{2}) | Town | Glens Falls MSA | 1803 | |
| Greenwich | Washington | 1,902 | 1.5 sq mi (3.9 km^{2}) | Village | Glens Falls MSA | 1809 | |
| Guilderland | Albany | 32,688 | 58.7 sq mi (152 km^{2}) | Town | Alb.-Sch.-Troy MSA | 1803 | |
| Hadley | Saratoga | 1,971 | 41.1 sq mi (106.4 km^{2}) | Town | Alb.-Sch.-Troy MSA | 1801 | |
| Hagaman | Montgomery | 1,357 | 1.5 sq mi (4.0 km^{2}) | Village | Amsterdam μSA | 1892 | |
| Hague | Warren | 854 | 79.6 sq mi (206.2 km^{2}) | Town | Glens Falls MSA | 1807 | |
| Halcott | Greene | 193 | 23.0 sq mi (59.7 km^{2}) | Town | None | 1851 | |
| Halfmoon | Saratoga | 18,474 | 33.7 sq mi (87.2 km^{2}) | Town | Alb.-Sch.-Troy MSA | 1788 | |
| Hampton | Washington | 871 | 22.6 sq mi (58.6 km^{2}) | Town | Glens Falls MSA | 1786 | |
| Hartford | Washington | 2,279 | 43.5 sq mi (112.6 km^{2}) | Town | Glens Falls MSA | 1793 | |
| Hebron | Washington | 1,773 | 56.4 sq mi (146.1 km^{2}) | Town | Glens Falls MSA | 1786 | |
| Hillsdale | Columbia | 1,744 | 47.8 sq mi (123.7 km^{2}) | Town | Hudson μSA | 1788 | |
| Hoosick | Rensselaer | 6,759 | 63.2 sq mi (163.6 km^{2}) | Town | Alb.-Sch.-Troy MSA | 1788 | |
| Hoosick Falls | Rensselaer | 3,436 | 1.7 sq mi (4.5 km^{2}) | Village | Alb.-Sch.-Troy MSA | 1827 | |
| Horicon | Warren | 1,479 | 71.8 sq mi (186.0 km^{2}) | Town | Glens Falls MSA | 1838 | |
| * Hudson | Columbia | 7,524 | 2.3 sq mi (6.0 km^{2}) | City | Hudson μSA | 1785 | |
| Hunter | Greene | 2,721 | 90.7 sq mi (235.0 km^{2}) | Town | None | 1813 | |
| Hunter | Greene | 490 | 1.6 sq mi (4.3 km^{2}) | Village | None | 1896 | |
| Jackson | Washington | 1,718 | 37.5 sq mi (97.0 km^{2}) | Town | Glens Falls MSA | 1815 | |
| Jefferson | Schoharie | 1,285 | 43.4 sq mi (112.5 km^{2}) | Town | Alb.-Sch.-Troy MSA | 1803 | |
| Jewitt | Greene | 970 | 50.5 sq mi (130.8 km^{2}) | Town | None | 1849 | |
| Johnsburg | Warren | 2,450 | 206.7 sq mi (535.5 km^{2}) | Town | Glens Falls MSA | 1805 | |
| * Johnstown | Fulton | 8,511 | 4.9 sq mi (12.6 km^{2}) | City | Gloversville μSA | 1895 | |
| Johnstown | Fulton | 7,166 | 71.4 sq mi (184.9 km^{2}) | Town | Gloversville μSA | 1793 | |
| Kinderhook | Columbia | 8,296 | 32.4 sq mi (84.0 km^{2}) | Town | Hudson μSA | 1788 | |
| Kinderhook | Columbia | 1,275 | 1.9 sq mi (4.9 km^{2}) | Village | Hudson μSA | 1838 | |
| Kingsbury | Washington | 11,171 | 40.0 sq mi (103.6 km^{2}) | Town | Glens Falls MSA | 1786 | |
| Knox | Albany | 2,647 | 41.9 sq mi (108.6 km^{2}) | Town | Alb.-Sch.-Troy MSA | 1822 | |
| Lake George | Warren | 3,578 | 32.7 sq mi (84.7 km^{2}) | Town | Glens Falls MSA | 1810 | |
| Lake George | Warren | 985 | 0.6 sq mi (1.6 km^{2}) | Village | Glens Falls MSA | 1903 | |
| Lake Luzerne | Warren | 3,219 | 54.1 sq mi (140.0 km^{2}) | Town | Glens Falls MSA | 1792 | |
| Lexington | Greene | 830 | 79.7 sq mi (206.5 km^{2}) | Town | None | 1813 | |
| Livingston | Columbia | 3,424 | 39.0 sq mi (100.9 km^{2}) | Town | Hudson μSA | 1788 | |
| Malta | Saratoga | 13,005 | 31.4 sq mi (81.2 km^{2}) | Town | Alb.-Sch.-Troy MSA | 1802 | |
| Mayfield | Fulton | 6,640 | 64.7 sq mi (167.5 km^{2}) | Town | Gloversville μSA | 1793 | |
| Mayfield | Fulton | 800 | 1.1 sq mi (2.8 km^{2}) | Village | Gloversville μSA | 1896 | |
| Mechanicville | Saratoga | 5,019 | 0.9 sq mi (2.4 km^{2}) | City | Alb.-Sch.-Troy MSA | 1915 | |
| Menands | Albany | 3,910 | 3.4 sq mi (8.8 km^{2}) | Village | Alb.-Sch.-Troy MSA | 1924 | |
| Middleburgh | Schoharie | 3,515 | 49.3 sq mi (127.6 km^{2}) | Town | Alb.-Sch.-Troy MSA | 1797 | |
| Middleburgh | Schoharie | 1,398 | 1.2 sq mi (3.1 km^{2}) | Village | Alb.-Sch.-Troy MSA | 1881 | |
| Milton | Saratoga | 17,103 | 35.6 sq mi (92.3 km^{2}) | Town | Alb.-Sch.-Troy MSA | 1792 | |
| Minden | Montgomery | 4,202 | 51.5 sq mi (133.3 km^{2}) | Town | Amsterdam μSA | 1798 | |
| Mohawk | Montgomery | 3,902 | 35.4 sq mi (91.7 km^{2}) | Town | Amsterdam μSA | 1837 | |
| Moreau | Saratoga | 13,826 | 43.6 sq mi (112.96 km^{2}) | Town | Alb.-Sch.-Troy MSA | 1805 | |
| Nassau | Rensselaer | 4,818 | 45.2 sq mi (117.1 km^{2}) | Town | Alb.-Sch.-Troy MSA | 1807 | |
| Nassau | Rensselaer | 1,161 | 0.7 sq mi (1.8 km^{2}) | Village | Alb.-Sch.-Troy MSA | 1819 | |
| Nelliston | Montgomery | 622 | 1.2 sq mi (3.1 km^{2}) | Village | Amsterdam μSA | 1878 | |
| New Baltimore | Greene | 3,417 | 43.1 sq mi (111.7 km^{2}) | Town | None | 1811 | |
| New Lebanon | Columbia | 2,454 | 36.0 sq mi (93.2 km^{2}) | Town | Hudson μSA | 1818 | |
| New Scotland | Albany | 8,626 | 58.4 sq mi (151.3 km^{2}) | Town | Alb.-Sch.-Troy MSA | 1832 | |
| Niskayuna | Schenectady | 20,295 | 15.1 sq mi (39.0 km^{2}) | Town | Alb.-Sch.-Troy MSA | 1809 | |
| North Greenbush | Rensselaer | 10,805 | 19.0 sq mi (49.3 km^{2}) | Town | Alb.-Sch.-Troy MSA | 1855 | |
| Northampton | Fulton | 2,760 | 34.7 sq mi (89.9 km^{2}) | Town | Gloversville μSA | 1799 | |
| Northumberland | Saratoga | 4,603 | 32.9 sq mi (85.2 km^{2}) | Town | Alb.-Sch.-Troy MSA | 1798 | |
| Northville | Fulton | 1,139 | 1.4 sq mi (3.7 km^{2}) | Village | Gloversville μSA | 1873 | |
| Oppenheim | Fulton | 1,774 | 56.5 sq mi (146.2 km^{2}) | Town | Gloversville μSA | 1808 | |
| Palatine | Montgomery | 3,070 | 41.7 sq mi (108.1 km^{2}) | Town | Amsterdam μSA | 1788 | |
| Palatine Bridge | Montgomery | 706 | 0.9 sq mi (2.5 km^{2}) | Village | Amsterdam μSA | 1867 | |
| Perth | Fulton | 3,638 | 26.1 sq mi (67.5 km^{2}) | Town | Gloversville μSA | 1838 | |
| Petersburgh | Rensselaer | 1,563 | 41.6 sq mi (107.7 km^{2}) | Town | Alb.-Sch.-Troy MSA | 1791 | |
| Philmont | Columbia | 1,480 | 1.2 sq mi (3.1 km^{2}) | Village | Hudson μSA | 1891 | |
| Pittstown | Rensselaer | 5,644 | 64.8 sq mi (167.9 km^{2}) | Town | Alb.-Sch.-Troy MSA | 1788 | |
| Poestenkill | Rensselaer | 4,054 | 32.6 sq mi (84.4 km^{2}) | Town | Alb.-Sch.-Troy MSA | 1848 | |
| Prattsville | Greene | 665 | 19.7 sq mi (51.1 km^{2}) | Town | None | 1824 | |
| Princetown | Schenectady | 2,132 | 24.1 sq mi (62.4 km^{2}) | Town | Alb.-Sch.-Troy MSA | 1798 | |
| Providence | Saratoga | 1,841 | 45.1 sq mi (116.8 km^{2}) | Town | Alb.-Sch.-Troy MSA | 1796 | |
| Putnam | Washington | 645 | 35.5 sq mi (91.8 km^{2}) | Town | Glens Falls MSA | 1806 | |
| Queensbury | Warren | 25,411 | 64.81 sq mi (167.9 km^{2}) | Town | Glens Falls MSA | 1786 | |
| Ravena | Albany | 3,369 | 1.3 sq mi (3.5 km^{2}) | Village | Alb.-Sch.-Troy MSA | 1914 | |
| Rensselaer | Rensselaer | 7,761 | 3.3 sq mi (8.6 km^{2}) | City | Alb.-Sch.-Troy MSA | 1897 | |
| Rensselaerville | Albany | 1,915 | 61.9 sq mi (160.2 km^{2}) | Town | Alb.-Sch.-Troy MSA | 1790 | |
| Richmondville | Schoharie | 2,412 | 30.2 sq mi (78.3 km^{2}) | Town | Alb.-Sch.-Troy MSA | 1849 | |
| Richmondville | Schoharie | 786 | 1.8 sq mi (4.7 km^{2}) | Village | Alb.-Sch.-Troy MSA | 1881 | |
| Root | Montgomery | 1,752 | 51.0 sq mi (132.1 km^{2}) | Town | Amsterdam μSA | 1823 | |
| Rotterdam | Schenectady | 28,316 | 36.5 sq mi (94.5 km^{2}) | Town | Alb.-Sch.-Troy MSA | 1820 | |
| Round Lake | Saratoga | 604 | 1.2 sq mi (3.0 km^{2}) | Village | Alb.-Sch.-Troy MSA | 1869 | |
| St. Johnsville | Montgomery | 2,565 | 17.4 sq mi (45.0 km^{2}) | Town | Amsterdam μSA | 1838 | |
| St. Johnsville | Montgomery | 1,685 | 0.9 sq mi (2.2 km^{2}) | Village | Amsterdam μSA | 1857 | |
| Salem | Washington | 2,702 | 52.5 sq mi (136.0 km^{2}) | Town | Glens Falls MSA | 1786 | |
| Salem | Washington | 964 | 2.9 sq mi (7.6 km^{2}) | Village | Glens Falls MSA | 1803 | |
| Sand Lake | Rensselaer | 7,987 | 36.2 sq mi (93.6 km^{2}) | Town | Alb.-Sch.-Troy MSA | 1812 | |
| Saratoga | Saratoga | 5,141 | 42.9 sq mi (111.1 km^{2}) | Town | Alb.-Sch.-Troy MSA | 1788 | |
| * Saratoga Springs | Saratoga | 28,186 | 29.1 sq mi (75.3 km^{2}) | City | Alb.-Sch.-Troy MSA | 1826 | |
| Schaghticoke | Rensselaer | 7,456 | 51.9 sq mi (134.3 km^{2}) | Town | Alb.-Sch.-Troy MSA | 1788 | |
| Schaghticoke | Rensselaer | 676 | 0.9 sq mi (2.3 km^{2}) | Village | Alb.-Sch.-Troy MSA | 1867 | |
| * Schenectady | Schenectady | 61,821 | 11.0 sq mi (28.5 km^{2}) | City | Alb.-Sch.-Troy MSA | 1798 | |
| Schodack | Rensselaer | 12,536 | 63.7 sq mi (164.9 km^{2}) | Town | Alb.-Sch.-Troy MSA | 1795 | |
| Schoharie | Schoharie | 3,299 | 30.0 sq mi (77.6 km^{2}) | Town | Alb.-Sch.-Troy MSA | 1788 | |
| Schoharie | Schoharie | 1,030 | 1.6 sq mi (4.3 km^{2}) | Village | Alb.-Sch.-Troy MSA | 1867 | |
| Schuylerville | Saratoga | 1,197 | 0.6 sq mi (1.5 km^{2}) | Village | Alb.-Sch.-Troy MSA | 1831 | |
| Scotia | Schenectady | 7,957 | 1.8 sq mi (4.6 km^{2}) | Village | Alb.-Sch.-Troy MSA | 1904 | |
| Seward | Schoharie | 1,637 | 36.5 sq mi (94.4 km^{2}) | Town | Alb.-Sch.-Troy MSA | 1840 | |
| Sharon | Schoharie | 1,843 | 39.2 sq mi (101.4 km^{2}) | Town | Alb.-Sch.-Troy MSA | 1797 | |
| Sharon Springs | Schoharie | 547 | 1.8 sq mi (4.7 km^{2}) | Village | Alb.-Sch.-Troy MSA | 1871 | |
| South Glens Falls | Saratoga | 3,368 | 1.5 sq mi (3.9 km^{2}) | Village | Alb.-Sch.-Troy MSA | 1895 | |
| Stephentown | Rensselaer | 2,873 | 58.1 sq mi (150.4 km^{2}) | Town | Alb.-Sch.-Troy MSA | 1788 | |
| Stillwater | Saratoga | 7,522 | 43.6 sq mi (112.8 km^{2}) | Town | Alb.-Sch.-Troy MSA | 1788 | |
| Stillwater | Saratoga | 1,644 | 1.4 sq mi (3.7 km^{2}) | Village | Alb.-Sch.-Troy MSA | 1816 | |
| Stockport | Columbia | 2,933 | 13.1 sq mi (34.1 km^{2}) | Town | Hudson μSA | 1833 | |
| Stony Creek | Warren | 743 | 83.2 sq mi (215.5 km^{2}) | Town | Glens Falls MSA | 1852 | |
| Stratford | Fulton | 640 | 76.7 sq mi (198.6 km^{2}) | Town | Gloversville μSA | 1805 | |
| Stuyvesant | Columbia | 2,188 | 26.8 sq mi (69.3 km^{2}) | Town | Hudson μSA | 1823 | |
| Summit | Schoharie | 1,123 | 37.5 sq mi (97.0 km^{2}) | Town | Alb.-Sch.-Troy MSA | 1819 | |
| Taghkanic | Columbia | 1,118 | 40.2 sq mi (104.0 km^{2}) | Town | Hudson μSA | 1803 | |
| Tannersville | Greene | 448 | 1.1 sq mi (3.0 km^{2}) | Village | None | 1895 | |
| Thurman | Warren | 1,199 | 92.8 sq mi (240.3 km^{2}) | Town | Glens Falls MSA | 1792 | |
| * Troy | Rensselaer | 49,170 | 11.0 sq mi (28.5 km^{2}) | City | Alb.-Sch.-Troy MSA | 1816 | |
| Valatie | Columbia | 1,712 | 1.3 sq mi (3.3 km^{2}) | Village | Hudson μSA | 1856 | |
| Valley Falls | Rensselaer | 491 | 0.5 sq mi (1.2 km^{2}) | Village | Alb.-Sch.-Troy MSA | 1904 | |
| Victory | Saratoga | 544 | 0.5 sq mi (1.4 km^{2}) | Village | Alb.-Sch.-Troy MSA | 1849 | |
| Voorheesville | Albany | 2,705 | 2.1 sq mi (5.5 km^{2}) | Village | Alb.-Sch.-Troy MSA | 1899 | |
| Warrensburg | Warren | 4,255 | 64.8 sq mi (168.0 km^{2}) | Town | Glens Falls MSA | 1813 | |
| Waterford | Saratoga | 8,515 | 7.4 sq mi (19.2 km^{2}) | Town | Alb.-Sch.-Troy MSA | 1816 | |
| Waterford | Saratoga | 2,204 | 0.4 sq mi (0.9 km^{2}) | Village | Alb.-Sch.-Troy MSA | 1794 | |
| Watervliet | Albany | 10,207 | 1.5 sq mi (3.9 km^{2}) | City | Alb.-Sch.-Troy MSA | 1897 | |
| Westerlo | Albany | 3,466 | 58.5 sq mi (151.6 km^{2}) | Town | Alb.-Sch.-Troy MSA | 1815 | |
| White Creek | Washington | 3,411 | 47.9 sq mi (124.1 km^{2}) | Town | Glens Falls MSA | 1815 | |
| Whitehall | Washington | 4,035 | 58.8 sq mi (149.2 km^{2}) | Town | Glens Falls MSA | 1786 | |
| Whitehall | Washington | 2,667 | 4.8 sq mi (12.5 km^{2}) | Village | Glens Falls MSA | 1806 | |
| Wilton | Saratoga | 12,511 | 36.0 sq mi (93.2 km^{2}) | Town | Alb.-Sch.-Troy MSA | 1818 | |
| Windham | Greene | 1,660 | 45.4 sq mi (117.6 km^{2}) | Town | None | 1798 | |
| Wright | Schoharie | 1,547 | 28.7 sq mi (74.3 km^{2}) | Town | Alb.-Sch.-Troy MSA | 1846 | |

== See also ==
- Timeline of town creation in New York's Capital District
- Administrative divisions of New York
- List of cities in New York
- List of towns in New York
- List of villages in New York
