= East Riding =

East Riding may refer to:

- East Riding of Yorkshire, England
- East Riding, York Shire (Province of New York) (1664-1683)
- East Riding of County Cork, Ireland
- East Riding of County Galway, Ireland
