= Toponymies of places in New York's Capital District =

Origin of place names in New York

The toponymies of places in New York's Capital District are a varied lot, from non-English languages such as Native American, Dutch, and German to places named for famous people or families, of either local or national fame. Also, in the early 19th century, many places in the Hudson Valley, Capital District and points west were either named or renamed after places from Classical Antiquity (e.g. Athens, Cairo, Carthage, Greece, Ilion, Ithaca, Phoenicia, Rome, Syracuse, Troy, Utica)

== Settlements ==
Place Name	County	Toponymy	Language of origin	Year	Notes or previous names
Albany	Albany	Duke of Albany (Note: James Stuart (1633–1701), brother and successor of Charles II, was both the Duke of York and Duke of Albany before being crowned James II of England and James VII of Scotland in 1685. His title of Duke of York is the source of the name of the province of New York. Duke of Albany was a Scottish title given since 1398, generally to a younger son of the King of Scots. The name is ultimately derived from Alba, the Gaelic name for Scotland.)	English	1636	Fort Orange, Fuyck, Beverwyck, Williamstadt
Alplaus	Schenectady	Aal Plats, "place of the eels"	Dutch		
Altamont	Albany	High mountain	Latin	1887	Knowersville
Amsterdam (city and town)	Montgomery	Amsterdam, Netherlands	Dutch	1804	Veddersburg
Ancram	Columbia	town in Scotland where the Livingston family originated	Scottish	1814	Livingston Forge, Scotchtown, Gallatin
Argyle (town and village)	Washington	Argyllshire, Scotland where early settlers were from	Scottish		
Athens (town and village)	Greene	Athens, Greece			
Austerlitz	Columbia	Battle of Austerlitz	German	1818	
Ballston	Saratoga	Eliphalet Ball	a surname		Ball's Town, Ballton
Bethlehem	Albany	in honor of the religious in the community	English		
Bleecker	Fulton	Barent Bleecker, early settler	surname of possible Dutch origin		
Bloodville	Saratoga	Isaiah Blood, operator of the Ballston Axe & Scythe Works	English		
Boght	Albany	bend of river	Dutch		Groesbeck's Corners
Brunswick	Rensselaer	possibly for Brunswick-Lüneburg, Germany	German	1807	
Burnt Hills	Saratoga	Condition of the area at the time the first settlers arrived			
Cairo	Greene	Cairo, Egypt		1808	
Cambridge (town and Cambridge)	Washington	Cambridge, England		1788	
Canaan	Columbia	Canaan, Connecticut		1788	Kings District
Canajoharie (town and village)	Montgomery	Canajoharie, a town, translated as "a washed kettle" or "the pot that washes itself"	Iroquoian languages		Name traced to a hole cut out by a 40-foot waterfall
Catskill (town and village)	Greene		Dutch		
Charleston	Montgomery	Charles Van Epps, an early settler			
Charlton	Saratoga	Village of Charlton, UK	English	1792	Queensboro, New Robertson
Claverack	Columbia	Corruption of "clover fields" or "clover reach"	Dutch		Lower Manor of Rensselaer
Clermont	Columbia	Clear mountain	French	1728	Livingston Forge, Scotchtown, Gallatin
Clifton Park	Saratoga	Derived from Nanning Harmansen; after he purchased piece of land from Native Americans, he wrote Lord Cornbury to request letters of Patent for Land for said purchase, also stating that it be known as "Your name of Cliftons park".	English	1829	Clifton
Coeymans	Albany	Barent Pieterse Coeymans	surname of possible Dutch origin		
Cohoes	Albany	Cohos, translated as "pine tree"	Algonquian		
Colonie (town and village)	Albany	Colonye; Colony of Rensselaerswyck surrounding Albany	Dutch	1895	
Copake	Columbia	Cook-pake or Ack-kook-peek ("Snake Pond")	Native American	1824	Derived from a lake in the town
Corinth (town and village)	Saratoga	Corinth, Greece	Greek	1818	Jessups Landing
Coxsackie (town and village)	Greene	"Hoot-owl place" or "nest of many owls"			Koixhacking or Koixhackung
Day	Saratoga	Eliphaz Day, noted lumberman	English	1827	Concord
Delanson	Schenectady	Delaware and Hudson Railway	English	1893	Toad Hollow
Delmar	Albany			1892	Adamsville; chosen by the Albany & Susquehanna Railway in order to avoid confusion with Adams, Jefferson County
Dresden	Washington			1822	South Bay
Duanesburg	Schenectady	Last name of man who purchased the landed	English	1765	Duane's Bush
East Greenbush	Rensselaer	Grennen Bosch (pinewood or literally, "Green Bush")	Dutch	1858	Clinton
Easton	Washington		English	1788	
Edinburg	Saratoga	Edinburgh, Scotland	English	1808	Northfield
Florida	Montgomery	State of Florida	Spanish		
Fonda	Montgomery	Douw Fonda, settler who was scalped during an Indian raid in 1780	Italian	1780	Caughnawaga
Fort Ann (town and village)	Washington			1775	Westfield
Fort Edward (town and village)	Washington			1818	
Fort Johnson	Montgomery	Sir William Johnson, 1st Baronet		1912	Mount Johnson, Akin
Fultonville	Montgomery	Robert Fulton, inventor of the steamboat		ca. 1824	Van Epps Swamp
Galway (town and village)	Saratoga	Misspelling of Galloway on incorporation of the town	English	1796	New Galloway; originally named for Galloway, Scotland
Gansevoort	Saratoga	Peter Gansevoort	Dutch	1792	New Robertson
Ghent	Columbia	Ghent, Belgium	Dutch	1818	
Glen	Montgomery	Jacob Saunders Glen, an early settler		ca. 1725	
Glenville	Schenectady	Alexander Lindsay Glen		1650s	
Gloversville	Fulton	Glove factory in the city	English	1828	
Granville (town and village)	Washington	John Carteret, 2nd Earl Granville		1780	
Green Island	Albany	Turkey Farm of Green Island		1834	Tibbits Island
Greenwich (town and village)	Washington			1803	Whipple City, Union Village
Guilderland	Albany	Province of Gelderland, origin of many of the town's settlers	Dutch	1803	Guilderlandt
Hadley	Saratoga	Hadley, Massachusetts	English	1801	
Hagaman	Montgomery	Joseph Hagaman, founder		ca. 1777	Hagamans Mills
Halfmoon	Saratoga	Anglicized from Halve Maan	Dutch to English	1788	Orange (1816-1820)
Hampton	Washington	Cambridge, England			Hampton Corners, Greenfield
Hebron	Washington	Hebron, Connecticut		1786	
Hudson	Columbia	Hudson River; ultimately Henry Hudson	English	1785	Claverack's Landing
Hudson Falls	Washington	Hudson River		ca. 1792	Sandy Hill
Huletts Landing	Washington	The Hulett family			Bosom Bay
Johnstown (town and city)	Fulton	Sir William Johnson, founder	English	1762	John's Town
Jonesville	Saratoga	John Jones, "first collector of the Town of Half Moon"			
Kinderhook (town and village)	Columbia	Kinderhoek ("Children's corner")	Dutch	1814	Livingston Forge, Scotchtown, Gallatin
Latham	Albany	Former hotel owner William G. Latham	English		
Livingston	Columbia	Livingston Manor		1686	
Loudonville	Albany	John Campbell, 4th Earl of Loudoun	English		Ireland's Corners
Malta	Saratoga	There was a malt brewery in the town in its early days, now known as Maltaville		1802	
Mechanicville	Saratoga	occupation of early residents		1829	
Menands	Albany	Louis Menand, founder of the village		1842	
Middle Granville	Washington	See entry from Granville'			
Milton	Saratoga	Either for Irish poet John Milton or a shortening of "Mill-town"	English	1792	
Minden	Montgomery	Probably for the town of Minden, Germany	German		
Mohawk	Montgomery	Mohawk River	Dutch language		Derived from Mohican
Moreau	Saratoga	Jean Victor Moreau, French general	French	1805	
Nelliston	Montgomery	Andrew Nellis, member of the founding family			
New Lebanon	Columbia	Mount Lebanon Shaker Society		1818	
Newtonville	Albany	John M. Newton, early landowner	English		
Niskayuna	Schenectady	Ni-sti-go-wo-ne; roughly "extensive corn flats"	Mohawk		
North Granville	Washington	See entry from Granville'			
North Greenbush	Rensselaer	see entry for East Greenbush		1858	Clinton
Northumberland	Saratoga	English county of the same name	English	1798	
Palatine; Palatine Bridge	Montgomery	Palatinate; A bridge in the settlement that spans the Mohawk River	German		
Philmont	Columbia	George P. Philip, who constructed a dam to power his factory via hydroelectricity, and so doing, built a reservoir in the Taconic Mountains	English	1878	Factory Hill
Pittstown	Rensselaer	William Pitt, 1st Earl of Chatham	English	1761	George III named the town in honor of the leading statesman—and Prime Minister—of the time
Putnam; Putnam Station	Washington	Israel Putnam			
Rensselaer	Rensselaer	The Van Rensselaer family	Dutch	1792	
Rexford	Saratoga	Edward Rexford		1792	Rexford Flats
Root	Montgomery	General Erastus Root, New York state senator			
Rotterdam	Schenectady	Rotterdam, Netherlands	Dutch		
St. Johnsville (town and village)	Montgomery	Either Alexander St. John, surveyor, or St. John's Church, an early name for the area		ca. 1818	St. John's Church
Saratoga (town); Saratoga Springs	Saratoga	Known to be a corruption of a Native American name Se-rach-to-que	Mohawk	N/A; 1819	It is unsure whether it means "hillside country of the great water", "place of the swift water", or even "floating scum upon the water"
Schenectady	Schenectady	Schau-naugh-ta-da, translated as "on that side of the pinery" or "place beyond the pine plains"	Mohawk language		
Schuylerville	Saratoga	Philip Schuyler, general in the American Revolution	Dutch language	1831	Saratoga; sometimes referred to as Old Saratoga or Olde Saratoga
Scotia	Schenectady	Scotland	Latin	1650s	
Taghkanic	Columbia	Older spelling of "Taconic"	Native American	1803?	
Tribes Hill	Montgomery	Disputed (see below)			The name comes from either the earlier name of "Tripes Hill", so named because of a female settler who made tripe, or a popular gathering spot for Iroquois tribes
Troy	Rensselaer	Classical Troy, from Homer's Iliad	Greek	1789	
Valatie	Columbia	Vaaltje ("little falls")	Dutch	1665	
Victory	Saratoga	Defeat of the British at the Battles of Saratoga in 1777		1849	
Vischer Ferry	Saratoga	Eldert Vischer	Dutch	1783	
Voorheesville	Albany	Alonzo B. Voorhees, railroad attorney	Dutch		Union Depot
Waterford	Saratoga	Derived from name of village	English	1794	Half Moon Point
Watervliet	Albany	Probably from the town of Watervliet, Belgium (then in the Netherlands)	Dutch	late 19th C.	Gibbonsville, West Troy
Whitehall (town and Whitehall	Washington		1788	Skenesborough	

== Sources ==
- Brodhead, John Romeyn (1874). History of the State of New York. New York City: Harper & Brothers, Publishers. OCLC 458890237.(Full text via Google Books.)
- Leslie, Jhone (1888). E.G. Cody (ed.). The Historie of Scotland. James Dalrymple (trans.). Edinburgh: William Blackwood and Sons. OCLC 3217086.(Full text via Google Books.)
- Weise, Arthur James (1880). History of the Seventeen Towns of Rensselaer County from the Colonization of the Manor of Rensselaerwyck to the Present Time. Troy, New York: J. M. Francis & Tucker. OCLC 6637788.(Full text via the Internet Archive.)
