= East Yorkshire (disambiguation) =

East Yorkshire is an alternative name for the East Riding of Yorkshire, a county in Northern England.

East Yorkshire may also refer to:

- East Yorkshire (bus company) – formerly East Yorkshire Motor Services – a bus company in Yorkshire, England
- East Yorkshire (district), a local government district of the county of Humberside, England, from 1974 to 1996, known as "North Wolds" from 1974 to 1981
- East Yorkshire (UK Parliament constituency) (1997-2024)
- East Riding of Yorkshire (UK Parliament constituency) (1832–1885)
- East Riding, York Shire, one of three ridings of York Shire (Province of New York) (1664-1683), now Suffolk County, New York
