= Timeline of town creation in Central New York =

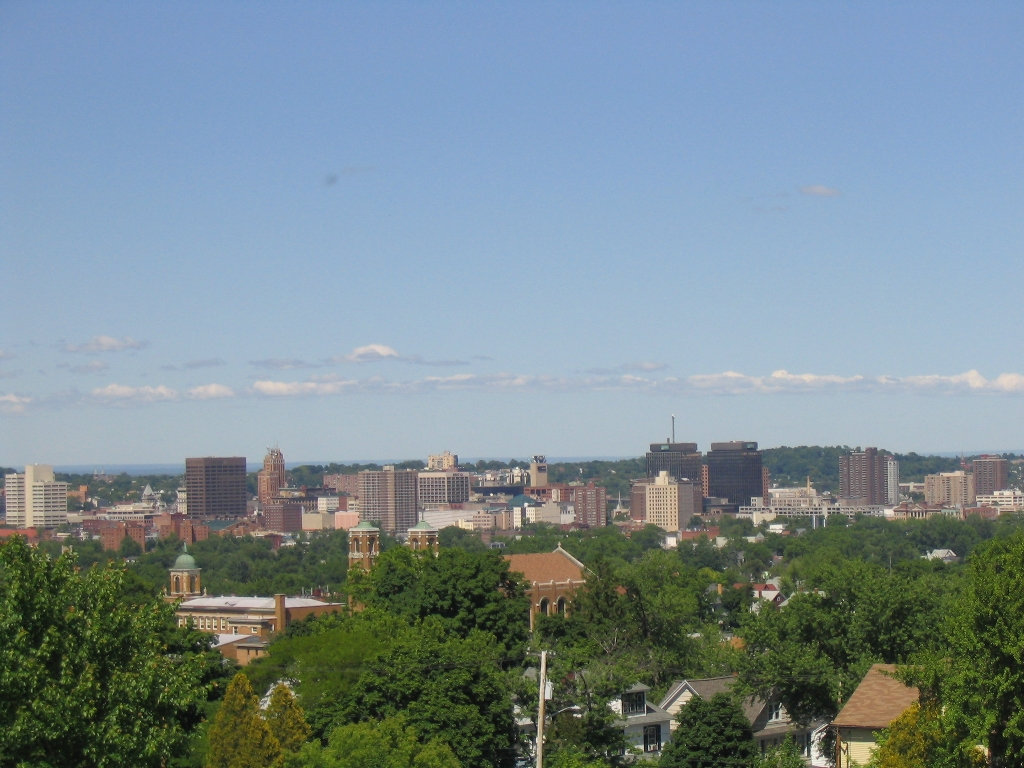
Skyline of Downtown Syracuse

The towns and cities of Central New York were created by the U.S. state of New York as municipalities in order to give residents more direct say over local government. Central New York (consisting of the Syracuse Consolidated Metropolitan Statistical Area and the Utica-Rome Metropolitan Statistical Area) is a six county area–Cayuga, Herkimer, Madison, Oneida, Onondaga, and Oswego.

The entire area was nominally under the jurisdiction of Albany County from 1686 until the Royal Proclamation of 1763 but truly under the Iroquois Confederacy until 1777. The area was then nominally Tryon County from 1781 and effectively in 1784 when the county was renamed Montgomery, and then the area was part of Herkimer County from 1791.

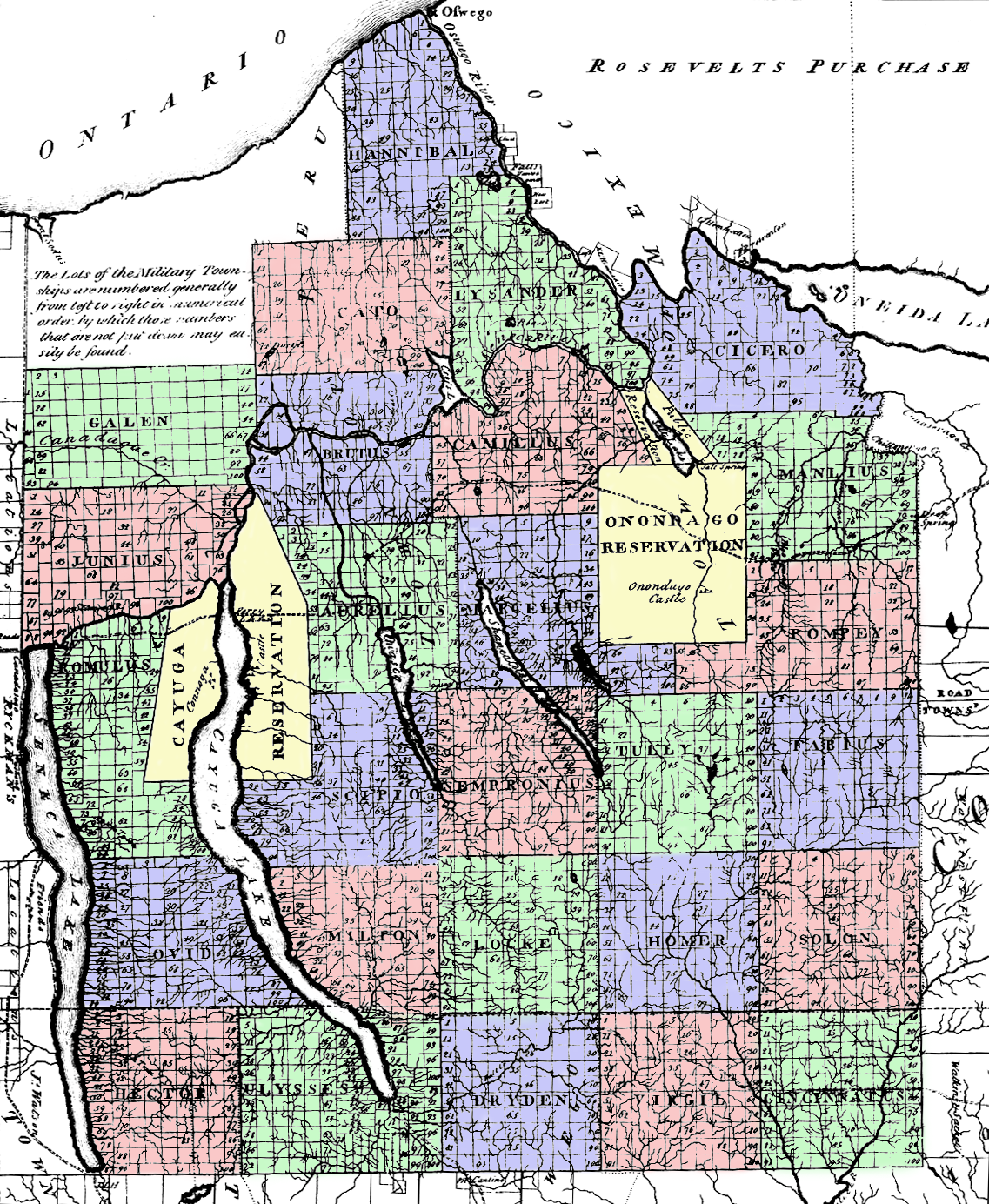
The Military Tract of Central New York (1792).

In 1794 the western section of Herkimer County was split off as Onondaga County, and then in 1798 the northwestern section of Herkimer was removed as Oneida County and the southwestern section as Chenango County. Cayuga County was removed from Onondaga in 1799, Madison County from Chenango in 1806, and Oswego from Onondaga and Oneida in 1816.

The current towns of Herkimer, Oneida, and Madison counties are descended from the original districts and towns of Montgomery County; whereas the towns of Onondaga and Cayuga counties are descended from the towns erected by the state when Onondaga County was formed from the Military Tract in western Herkimer County which had previously been divided into townships for the purpose of surveying of lands to be sold to veterans of the US Revolutionary War.

New York experimented with different types of municipalities before settling upon the current format of towns and cities occupying all the land in a county, and all previous forms were transformed into towns (or divided into multiple towns) in 1788 when all of the state of New York was divided into towns. Some early forms of government in earlier years included land patents with some municipal rights, districts, precincts, and boroughs. Though originally intended to be mere “…involuntary subdivisions of the state, constituted for the purpose of the more convenient exercise of governmental functions by the state for the benefit of all its citizens” as defined by the courts in 1916 (Short v. Town of Orange), towns gained home rule powers from the state in 1964, at which time towns became "a municipal corporation comprising the inhabitants within its boundaries, and formed with the purpose of exercising such powers and discharging such duties of local government and administration of public affairs as have been, or, maybe [sic] conferred or imposed upon it by law.”

The following is a timeline showing the creation of the current towns from their predecessors stretching back to the earliest municipal entity over the area. The timelines only represent from which town(s) a particular town was created from and does not represent annexations of territory to and from towns that already existed. All municipalities are towns unless otherwise noted as patent, township, borough, district, or city.

== Cayuga County ==
A map of the towns and villages in Cayuga County

Aurelius; 1794	Auburn; 1823-1848	Auburn; City 1848
Brutus; 1802	Sennett; 1827	Throop; 1859
Cato; 1802	Sterling; 1812
Conquest; 1821
Ira; 1821
Victory; 1821
Jefferson 1802 (Mentz from 1808)	Montezuma; 1859
Owasco; 1802
Fleming; 1823
Springport; 1823
Scipio; 1794	Venice; 1823
Ledyard; 1823
Sempronius; 1799	Moravia; 1833
Niles; 1833
Milton 1789 (Genoa from 1808)	Locke; 1802	Plato 1831 (Summer Hill from 1832)

Notes

[A] = A part of Montgomery County until 1791, then Herkimer County from 1791-1794,
Onondaga County from 1794-1799, and Cayuga County from 1799 and thereafter.

[B] = A part of Onondaga County until 1799 thereafter Cayuga County.

[C] = A part of Cayuga County.

- Prior to the creation of Onondaga County the western section of Herkimer County was the Military Tract. This tract included present-day Onondaga, Cayuga, and Seneca counties, and parts of Oswego, Tompkins, and Wayne; and was divided into 25 townships for surveying purposes to provide land for veterans of the US Revolutionary War. Three more townships were created in order to settle all claims. Originally simply numbered, they latter received names, mostly classical Greek and Roman names. In creating Onondaga County in 1794 the state of New York combined the townships into 11 towns. Milton (17), Locke (18), Scipio (12), Sempronius (13), Cato (3), Brutus (4), and Aurelius (8) were the townships in present-day Cayuga County, which were combined in 1794 into the towns of Milton (Milton and Locke townships), Scipio (Scipio and Sempronius townships), and Aurelius (Cato, Brutus, and Aurelius townships).

== Herkimer County ==
German Flatts; District 1772-1788 (Kingsland from 1773)	German Flatts; 1788	Frankfort; 1796
Warren; 1796	Columbia; 1812
Litchfield; 1796
Winfield; 1816
Richfield 1792	Plainfield; 1799
Otsego; 1788	For further descendants see Otsego County.	For further descendants see Otsego County
Little Falls; 1829	Little Falls; City 1895
For further descendants see Oneida County
Schuyler; 1792	Newport; 1806
Kingsland Precinct; 1772-1788 (German Flatts from 1773)	Herkimer; 1788	Norway; 1792	Fairfield; 1796
West Brunswick; 1823 (Ohio from 1836)
For further descendants see Oneida County	Union 1806 (Russia from 1808)	Wilmurt; 1836-1896	Webb; 1896

Stone Arabia; Precinct 1772-1788 (Palatine from 1773)	Palatine; 1788	Salisbury; 1797
		Manheim; 1817
Canajoharie; Precinct 1772-1788	Canajoharie; 1788	Minden; 1798	Danube; 1817	Stark; 1828

Notes

[A] = A part of Montgomery (Named Tryon County prior to 1784).

[B] = A part of Montgomery County until 1791, thereafter Herkimer County.

[C] = A part of Montgomery County until 1791, thereafter Otsego County.

[D] = A part of Otsego County.

[E] = A part of Montgomery County until annexed to Herkimer County in 1817.

[F] = A part of Herkimer County.

[G] = A part of Oneida County.

== Madison County ==
Oneida; 1896–1901	Oneida; City 1901
Lincoln; 1896
Sullivan; 1803	Lenox; 1809
DeRuyter; 1798	Georgetown; 1815
For further descendants see Oneida County	Stockbridge; 1836
Whitestown; 1788	Cazenovia; 1795	Nelson; 1807	Smithfield; 1807	Fenner; 1823
Paris; 1792	Brookfield; 1795
Hamilton; 1795	Eaton; 1807
For further descendants see Oneida County	Lebanon; 1807
Madison; 1807
Augusta; 1798
Westmoreland; 1792	Vernon; 1802
For further descendants see Oneida County

Notes

[A] = A part of Montgomery County until 1791, Herkimer County from 1791 to 1798, then Oneida County from 1798.

[B] = A part of Herkimer County until 1798, Oneida County thereafter.

[C] = A part of Herkimer County until 1798, then Chenango until 1806, thereafter Madison County.

[D] = A part of Chenango County until 1806, then Madison County thereafter Oswego County.

[E] = A part of Oneida County.

[F] = A part of Madison County.

== Oneida County ==
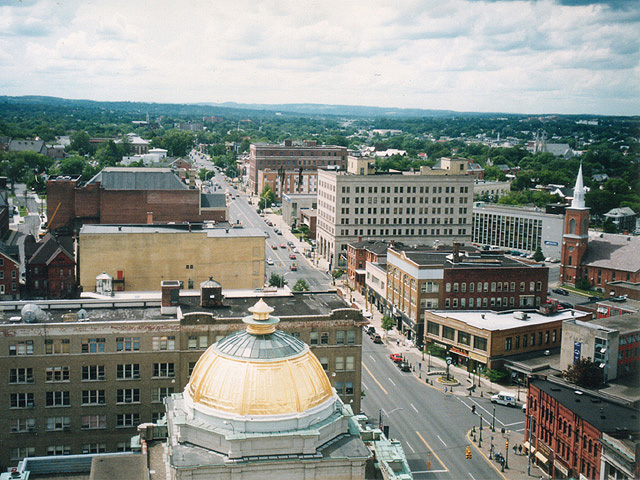
Utica, New York

For further descendants see Oswego County
Whitestown; 1788	Utica; 1817-1832	Utica; City 1832
For further descendants see North Country
Steuben; 1792	Leyden; 1797	Boonville; 1805	Ava; 1846
Western; 1797	Lee; 1811
New Hartford; 1827	Floyd; 1796
Rome; 1796-1870	Rome; City 1870
Paris; 1792	Sangerfield; 1795	Bridgewater; 1797
Kirkland; 1827	Marshall; 1829
For further descendants see Madison County	For further descendants see Madison County
For further descendants see Oswego County
Mexico; 1792	Camden; 1799	Orange 1807 (Bengal from 1808-1816, Vienna from 1816)	Annsville; 1823
For further descendants see North Country
Augusta; 1798	For further descendants see Madison County	Florence; 1805
Verona; 1802
Westmoreland; 1792	Vernon; 1802	Sherrill; City 1916
For further descendants see Madison County

Kingsland 1772-1788 (German Flatts from 1773)	Herkimer; 1788	Schuyler; 1792	Trenton; 1797
Deerfield; 1798	Marcy; 1832
For further descendants see Herkimer County
Norway; 1792	Remsen; 1798	Forestport; 1869
For further descendants see Herkimer County	For further descendants see Herkimer County

Notes

[A] = A part of Montgomery County (known as Tryon County prior to 1784).

[B] = A part of Montomgery County until 1791, thereafter Herkimer County.

[C] = A part of Montgomery County until 1791, Herkimer County from 1791 to 1798, then Oneida County from 1798.

[D] = A part of Herkimer County until 1798, Oneida County thereafter.

[E] = A part of Herkimer County.

[F] = A part of Oneida County.

[G] = A part of Madison County.

[H] = A part of Herkimer County until 1798, then Oneida County until 1805, thereafter Lewis County.

[I] = A part of Herkimer County until 1798, then Oneida County until 1816, thereafter Oswego County.

[J] = A part of Oswego County.

- The city of Sherrill is considered in some circumstances of law to be a village under the jurisdiction of the town of Vernon.

== Onondaga County ==
A map of the towns, villages, city, and Native American reservations in Onondaga County

Otisco; 1806
Fabius; 1798	Tully; 1803	Spafford; 1811
Pompey; 1794	LaFayette; 1825
Marcellus; 1794	Onondaga; 1798
Salina; 1809	Geddes; 1848
Manlius; 1794	DeWitt; 1835	Syracuse; City 1847
Skaneateles; 1830	Camillus; 1799	Van Buren; 1829
Elbridge; 1829

Notes

- Prior to the creation of Onondaga County the western section of Herkimer County was the Military Tract. This tract included present-day Onondaga, Cayuga, and Seneca counties, and parts of Oswego, Tompkins, and Wayne; and was divided into 25 townships for surveying purposes to provide land for veterans of the US Revolutionary War. Three more townships were created in order to settle all claims. Originally simply numbered, they latter received names, mostly classical Greek and Roman names. In creating Onondaga County in 1794 the state of New York combined the townships into 11 towns. Pompey (10), Tully (14), Fabius (15), Manlius (7), Camillus (5), and Marcellus (9) occupied present-day Onondaga, and were combined as the towns of Pompey (Pompey, Tully, and Fabius townships), Marcellus (Camillus and Marcellus townships), and Manlius.

== Oswego County ==
A map of towns and cities located in Oswego County

Minetto; 1916
Oswego; 1818
Lysander; 1794	Hannibal; 1806	Granby; 1818	Fulton; City 1902
Oswego; City 1848
Whitestown; 1788	Mexico; 1792	Fredericksburgh 1806 (Volney from 1811)	Scriba; 1811
New Haven; 1813	Schroeppel; 1832
For further descendants see Oneida County	Parish; 1828	Palermo; 1832
Williamstown; 1804	Amboy; 1830
Richland; 1807	Albion; 1825
Redfield; 1800	Greenboro; 1843-1848	Sandy Creek; 1825
Constantia; 1808	Hastings; 1825	Orwell; 1817	Boylston; 1828
West Monroe; 1839

Notes

[A] = A part of Montgomery County until 1791, Herkimer County from 1791 to 1798, then Oneida County from 1798.

[B] = A part of Herkimer County until 1798, then Oneida County until 1816, thereafter Oswego County.

[C] = A part of Oneida County.

[D] = A part of Oneida County until 1816, Oswego County thereafter.

[E] = A part of Oswego County.

== See also ==
- Administrative divisions of New York
- List of cities in New York
- List of towns in New York
- List of villages in New York
- Timeline of town creation in Downstate New York
- Timeline of town creation in New York's Capital District
- Timeline of town creation in the Hudson Valley
- Timeline of town creation in New York's North Country
