= Timeline of town creation in the Hudson Valley =

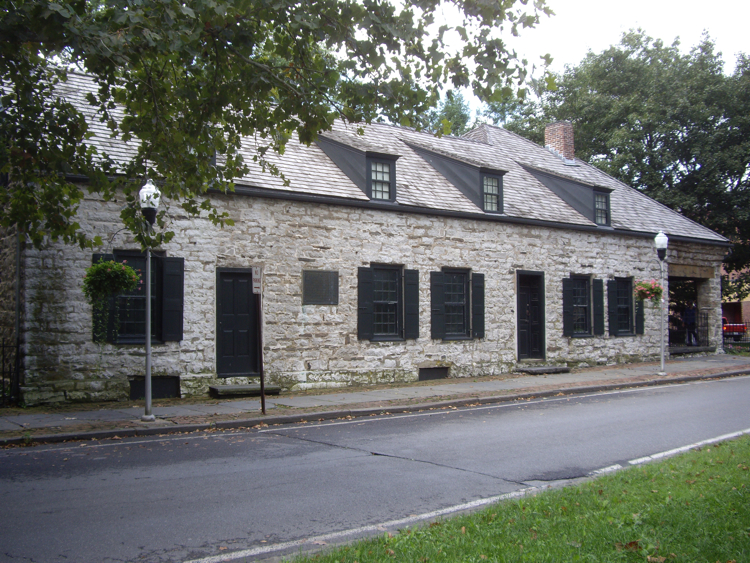
The Senate House, in Kingston, is where the U.S. state of New York was founded in 1777. The predecessors of Hudson Valley towns predate the state.

The towns and cities of the Hudson Valley were created by the U.S. state of New York as municipalities, in order to perform the services of local government. In 1683, prior to the creation of modern towns, the Province of New York was divided into twelve counties for administrative purposes by the Colonial Governor of New York. In the Hudson Valley, these divisions included Dutchess, Orange, and Ulster counties. Dutchess and Orange remained unorganized until 1713, with Dutchess administered from Ulster; Orange would be administered from New York County. Future counties would be formed and towns exchanged over time, with Rockland County split from Orange in 1799, at which time the southern towns of Ulster were transferred to Orange as compensation for the loss; and Putnam County from Dutchess in 1812, these county's towns can trace their origins to towns and precincts that were formed in their parent counties. Another change that occurred was the transfer of Dutchess County's northern section, the Livingston Manor, to Columbia County. Greene County was formed in 1800 by the combination of the southernmost towns of Albany County with the northernmost towns of Ulster. The history of the towns of Greene and Columbia counties can be found at the Timeline of town creation in New York's Capital District.

New York experimented with different types of municipalities before settling upon the current format of towns and cities occupying all the land in a county, and all previous forms were transformed into towns (or divided into multiple towns) in 1788 when all of the state of New York was divided into towns. Some early forms of government in earlier years included land patents with some municipal rights, districts, precincts, and boroughs. Though originally intended to be mere "…involuntary subdivisions of the state, constituted for the purpose of the more convenient exercise of governmental functions by the state for the benefit of all its citizens" as defined by the courts in 1916 (Short v. Town of Orange), towns gained home rule powers from the state in 1964, at which time towns became "a municipal corporation comprising the inhabitants within its boundaries, and formed with the purpose of exercising such powers and discharging such duties of local government and administration of public affairs as have been, or, maybe [sic] conferred or imposed upon it by law."

The following is a timeline showing the creation of the current towns from their predecessors stretching back to the earliest municipal entity over the area. The timelines only represent which town(s) a particular town was created from and do not represent annexations of territory to and from towns that already existed. All municipalities are towns unless otherwise noted as patent, township, borough, district, or city.

== Dutchess County ==
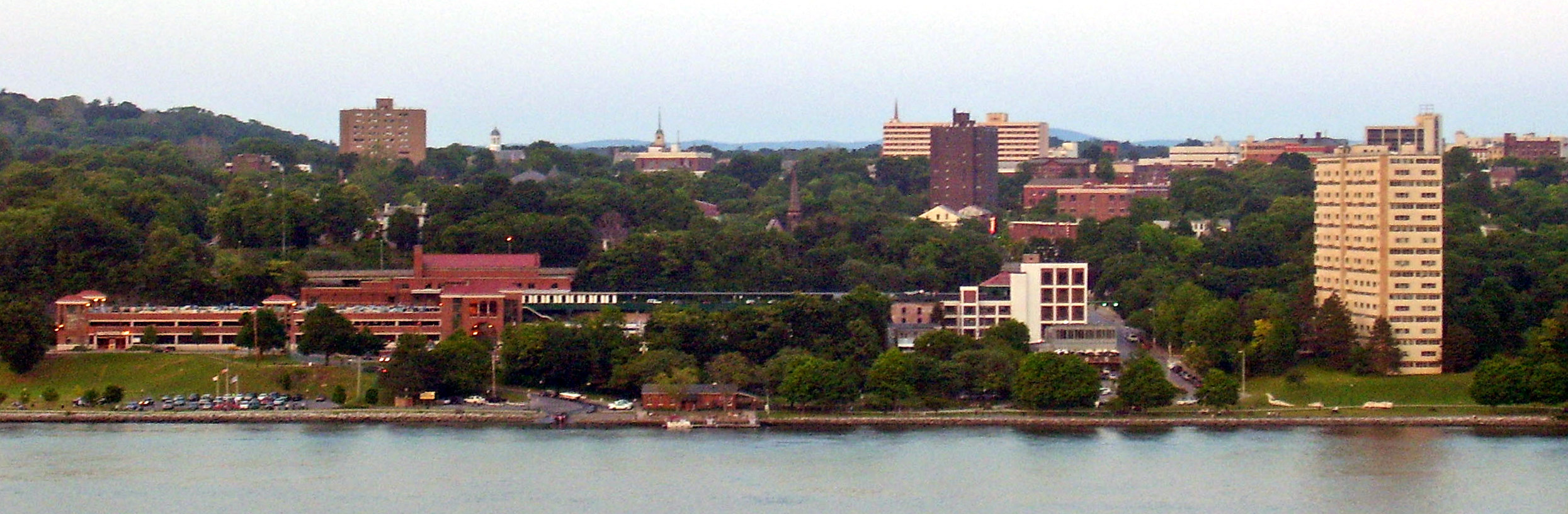
Downtown Poughkeepsie as seen from across the Hudson River

Beacon; 1913
Wappinger; 1875
Rombout; Precinct 1737–1788	Fishkill; 1788	East Fishkill; 1849
Freedom 1821 (LaGrange from 1828)
Union Vale; 1827
Beekman; Precinct 1737–1788	Beekman; 1788
Pawling's; Precinct 1768–1788	Pawling; 1788	Dover; 1807

Crum Elbow; Precinct; 1737–1762	Amenia; Precinct 1762–1788	Amenia; 1788
Charlotte; Precinct 1762–1788 (Clinton from 1786)	Washington; 1788	Stanford; 1793
Pleasant Valley; 1821
Rhinebeck; Precinct; 1737–1788	Clinton; 1788	Hyde Park; 1821
Rhinebeck; 1788	Red Hook; 1812

Poughkeepsie; Precinct 1737–1788	Poughkeepsie; 1788	Poughkeepsie; City 1854

North Precinct 1737–1746 (Also known as Northeast)	Northeast; 1788	Milan; 1818
		Pine Plains; 1823

=== Notes ===
- Dutchess County was one of the twelve original counties formed in 1683 in the Province of New York; but was under the governance of Ulster County until a county government was erected in 1713 at which point it received separate representation in the General Assembly. In 1737 Dutchess was divided into seven precincts, six of which descended into the present towns of Dutchess County while the seventh became the progenitor of the towns of Putnam County.

== Putnam County ==
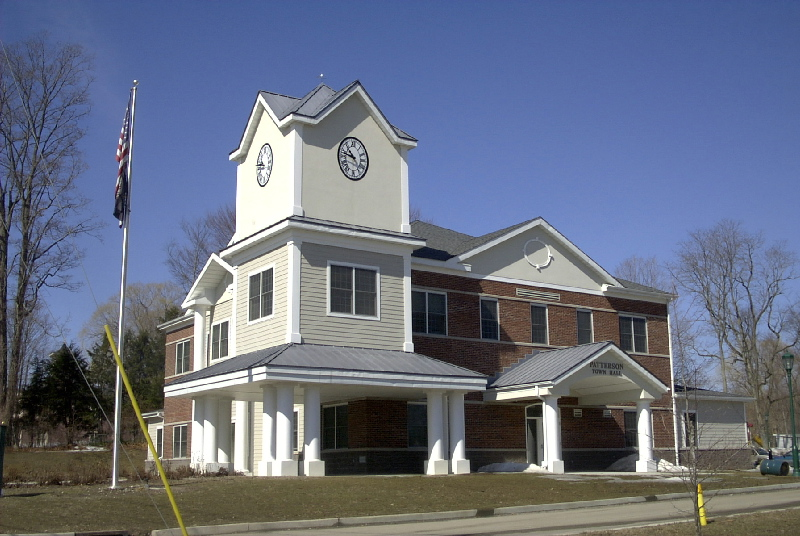
Patterson Town Hall

	Fredericksburgh[A] Precinct 1772–1788	Frederickstown[B] 1788 (Frederick from 1795; Kent from 1817)	Carmel[B] 1795
			Franklin[B] 1795 (Patterson from 1808)
South Precinct[A] 1737–1772	South East[A] Precinct 1772–1788	Southeasttown[B] 1788 (Southeast from 1795)
	Philips[A] Precinct; 1772–1788	Philipstown[B] 1788	Quincy[C] 1839 (Putnam Valley from 1840)

=== Notes ===
[A] = A part of Dutchess County.

[B] = A part of Dutchess County until 1812, thereafter Putnam County.

[C] = A part of Putnam County.

== Ulster County ==
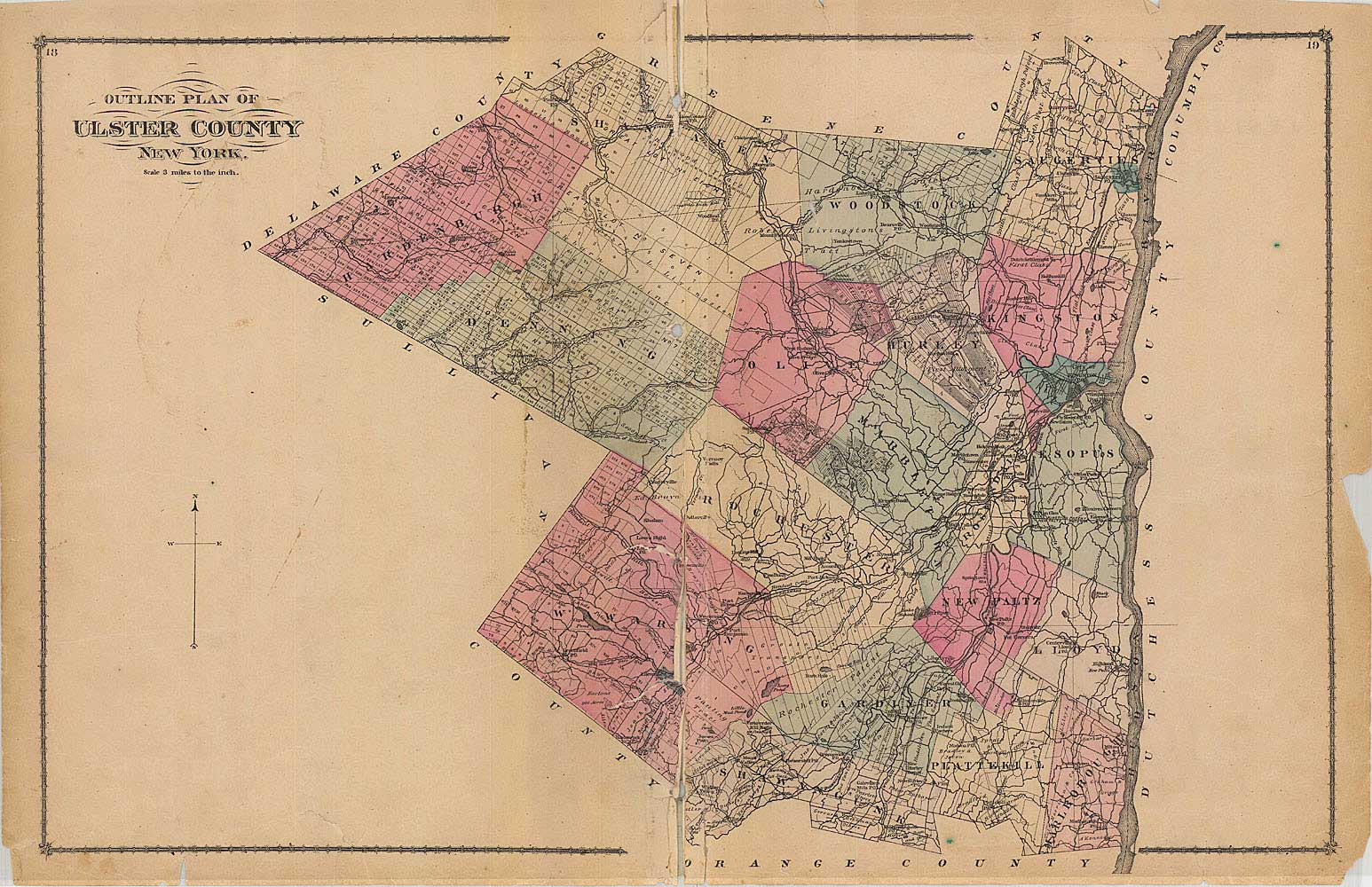
Town and city boundaries within Ulster County in 1875

Hurley[A] Precinct; 1708–1788	Hurley[A] 1788	Hardenburgh[A] 1859
Woodstock[A] township 1787–1788	Woodstock[A] 1788	Shandaken[A] 1804	Denning[A] 1849
Windham[D] 1788
Gardiner[A] 1853
Rochester[A] Patent 1703–1788	Rochester[A] 1788	Wawarsing[A] 1806
New Paltz[A] Patent 1677–1788	New Paltz[A] 1788	Lloyd[A] 1845
Rosendale[A] 1844
Marbletown[A] Patent 1703–1788	Marbletown[A] 1788	Olive[A] 1823
Esopus and Wiltwyck[B] Village/town 1661–1702 (Kingston from 1669)	Kingston[A] Township 1702–1788	Kingston[A] 1788	Kingston[A] City 1872
Saugerties[A] 1811
Shawangunk[A] Precinct 1743–1788	Shawangunk[A] 1788	Esopus[A] 1811
Ulster[A] 1879

Highlands[A] Precinct 1709–1763	New Windsor[A] Precinct 1763–1788	For further descendants see Orange County[C]
	Newburgh[A] Precinct 1763–1788	Marlborough[A] Precinct; 1772–1788	Marlborough[A] 1788	Plattekill[A] 1800
		For further descendants see Orange County[C]

=== Notes ===
[A] = A part of Ulster County.

[B] = A part of the Dutch colony of New Netherland until 1664, thereafter English, Ulster County after 1683.

[C] = A part of Ulster County until 1799, thereafter Orange County.

[D] = A part of Ulster County until 1800, thereafter Greene County. For further
descendants see Timeline of town creation in New York's Capital District.

- Wiltwyck and Esopus were a dependency of the Village of Beverwyck (Court of Fort Orange and Beverwyck) prior to 1661.
- Dash lines are used for leading to the town of Olive from its antecendants only help in tracking those lines, which due to space constraints cross other town's lines. No significance should be interpreted with the use of dash lines leading to the town of Olive.

== Orange County ==
Highlands[A] 1872
Cornwall[A] Precinct 1764–1788	New Cornwall[A] 1788 (Cornwall from 1797)	Blooming Grove[A] 1799
Woodbury[A] 1890
Chesecocks[A] 1799 (Southfield from 1801–1808 thereafter Monroe)
Tuxedo[A] 1890
Warwick[A] 1788	Chester[A] 1845
Goshen[A] 1788
Goshen[A] Precinct ?–1788	Hanover[B] Precinct 1772–1788 (Montgomery after 1782)	Montgomery[C] 1788	Crawford[A] 1823	Hamptonburgh[A] 1830
Wallkill[B] Precinct 1743–1788	New Windsor[B] Precinct 1763–1788	New Windsor[C] 1788
Highlands[B] Precinct 1709–1763	Newburgh[B] Precinct 1763–1788	Newburgh[C] 1788	Newburgh[A] City 1865
For further descendants see Ulster County section [B]
Wallkill[C] 1788	Middletown[C] City 1888
Wawayanda[A] 1849
Minisink[A] 1788	Greenville[A] 1853	Calhoun[A] 1825 (Mount Hope from 1833)
Mamakating[B] 1788	Deerpark[A] 1798
Port Jervis[A] City 1907

=== Notes ===
[A] = A part of Orange County.

[B] = A part of Ulster County.

[C] = A part of Ulster County until 1799, thereafter Orange County.

- In 1863 the Orange County Board of Supervisors erected two new towns from part of Monroe, named Highlands and Southfield. This was declared overruled by the state legislature in 1865 and therefore those towns are not shown here.
- In 2019, part of Monroe became the Town of Palm Tree pursuant to a 2017 referendum. (The above diagram has not yet been updated to include this development.)

== Rockland County ==
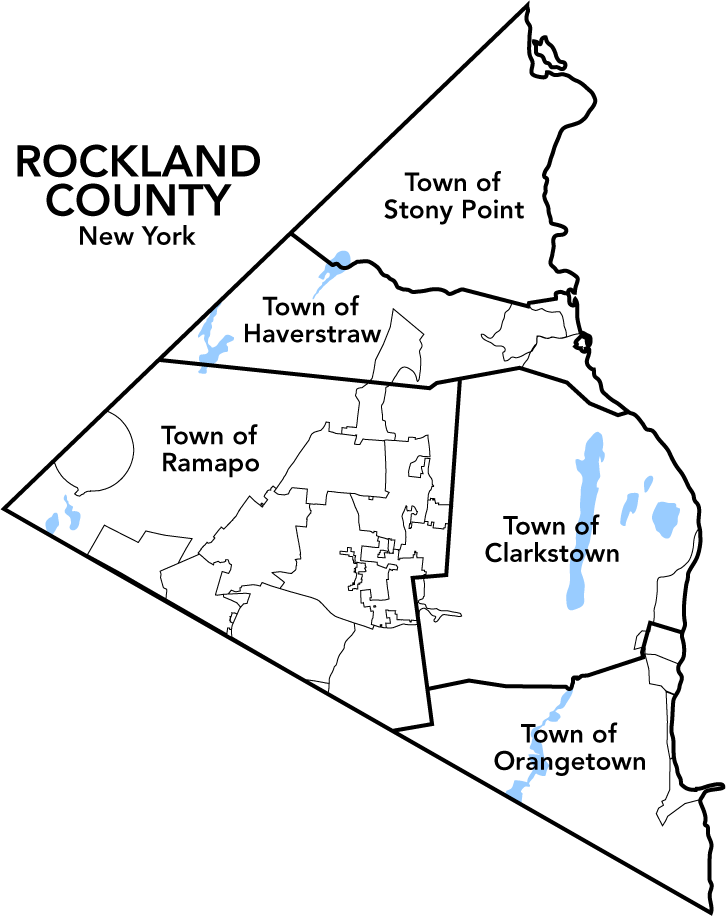
Rockland County, with town and village boundaries

Haverstraw[B] Precinct 1719–1788	Haverstraw[C] 1788	New Hampstead[A] 1791 (Ramapo from 1791)
		Clarkstown[A] 1791
Orangetown[C] 1788		Stony Point[A] 1865

=== Notes ===
[A] = A part of Rockland County.

[B] = A part of Orange County.

[C] = A part of Orange County until 1799, thereafter Rockland County.

== See also ==
- Timeline of town creation in Downstate New York
- Timeline of town creation in New York's Capital District
- Timeline of town creation in Central New York
- Timeline of town creation in New York's North Country
