= Hiram Congdon House =

Historic house in New York, United States

- U.S. National Register of Historic Places
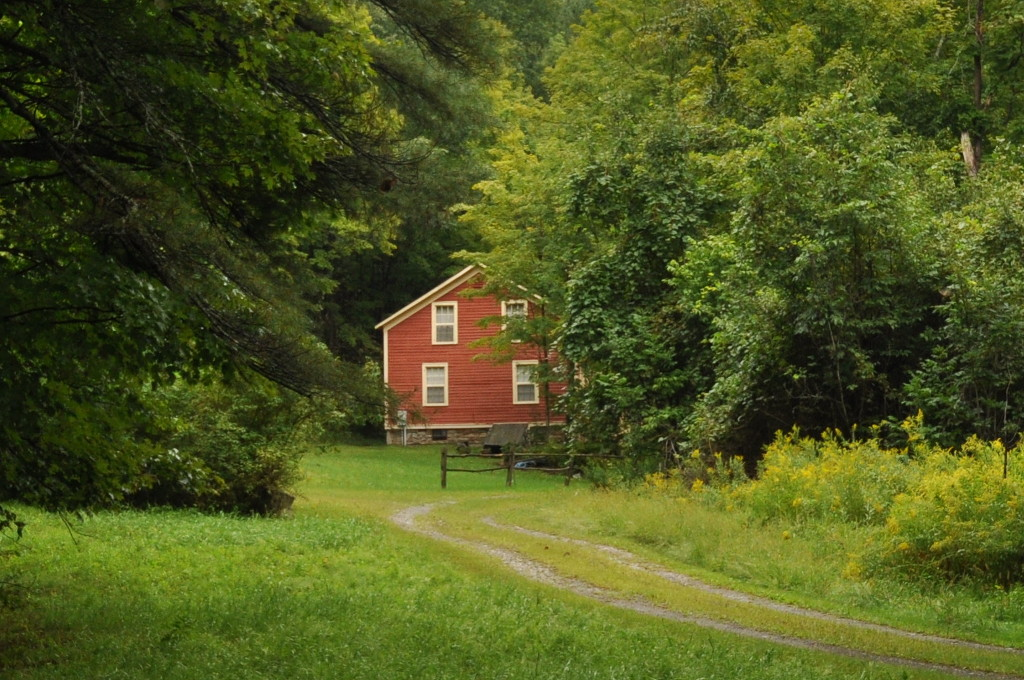

- Location within New York Location within the United States
- Location: NE of jct. of NY 22 and B Rd., Putnam, New York
- Coordinates: 43°41′58″N 73°25′52″W
- Area: 3 acres (1.2 ha)
- Built: 1848
- Architectural style: Mid 19th Century Revival, Greek Revival
- NRHP reference No.: 97001203
- Added to NRHP: September 30, 1997

Hiram Congdon House is a historic home located at Putnam in Washington County, New York. It was built about 1848 and is a 1 1/2-story, five-by-two-bay, side-gabled frame building with a 1-story ell. The main block is a 32-by-24-foot (9.8 by 7.3 m) heavy timber-frame structure set on a rubble stone foundation.

It was listed on the National Register of Historic Places in 1997.
