= Timeline of town creation in New York's North Country =

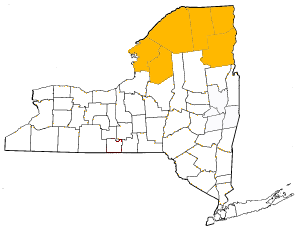
Counties of the North Country highlighted

The towns and cities of New York's North Country were created by the U.S. state of New York as municipalities in order to give residents more direct say over local government. The North Country consists of Clinton County, Essex County, Franklin County, Jefferson County, Lewis County, and St. Lawrence County. When counties were first formed in 1683 the entire area was theoretically under the jurisdiction of Albany County though actually wilderness inhabited by Native Americans, by 1764 most of the area became effectively controlled by Albany County. The state would sell off this land to settlers and speculators, most notably as part of the Old Military Tract (1786) to veterans of the US Revolutionary War and as Macomb's Purchase (1791) to Alexander Macomb. In 1772 the northern and western portions of Albany County was divided into two counties– Tryon and Charlotte. Tryon encompassed Lewis, Jefferson, and St. Lawrence counties along with the western section of Franklin; Tryon was renamed Montgomery in 1784. Charlotte encompassed Clinton, Essex, and the majority of Franklin County; the name of the county was changed to Washington County in 1784. In 1788 Clinton County was split from Washington, Essex was formed from Clinton in 1799 and Franklin was formed from Clinton in 1808. Montgomery County's North Country area went to Herkimer County on that county's formation in 1791, but western Franklin and eastern St. Lawrence were returned to Montgomery in 1797. In 1798 Lewis, Jefferson, and western St. Lawrence became part of the newly formed Oneida County from Herkimer in 1798, leaving only central St. Lawrence County as part of Herkimer. In 1801 the future St. Lawrence and Franklin counties which were portions of Montgomery, Herkimer, and Oneida were transferred to Clinton County; the next year in 1802 St. Lawrence was formed as a county. In 1805 both Lewis and Jefferson counties were formed from Oneida County.

In 1785, the township of Plattsburgh was formed in Washington County, and the next year all of Washington County was divided into townships, including the formation of Crown Point township which included all of future Essex County while Plattsburgh was expanded to include most of future Clinton County and Franklin counties. Towns in Franklin can all be traced back to Chateaugay, formed in 1799 a descendant of Plattsburgh. All the towns of Jefferson and Lewis counties can be traced back to Whitestown a town formed in Montgomery County in 1788. In 1801, a year before St. Lawrence County was formed the area of the county, which was 10 survey townships, was combined as the town of Lisbon, all towns in the county are descended from Lisbon.

New York experimented with different types of municipalities before settling upon the current format of towns and cities occupying all the land in a county, and all previous forms were transformed into towns (or divided into multiple towns) in 1788 when all of the state of New York was divided into towns. Some early forms of government in earlier years included land patents with some municipal rights, districts, precincts, and boroughs. Though originally intended to be mere “…involuntary subdivisions of the state, constituted for the purpose of the more convenient exercise of governmental functions by the state for the benefit of all its citizens” as defined by the courts in 1916 (Short v. Town of Orange), towns gained home rule powers from the state in 1964, at which time towns became "a municipal corporation comprising the inhabitants within its boundaries, and formed with the purpose of exercising such powers and discharging such duties of local government and administration of public affairs as have been, or, maybe [sic] conferred or imposed upon it by law.”

The following is a timeline showing the creation of the current towns from their predecessors stretching back to the earliest municipal entity over the area. The timelines only represent which town(s) a particular town was created from and does not represent annexations of territory to and from towns that already existed. All municipalities are towns unless otherwise noted as patent, township, borough, district, or city.

== Essex County ==
Crown; Point[A] township 1786-1788 | Willsboro[B] 1788 | For further descendants see Clinton and Franklin counties
Crown; Point[B] 1788 | Ticonderoga[C] 1804 | Lewis[C] 1805
Essex[C] 1805
Chesterfield[C] 1802
Jay[B] 1798 | Dansville[D] 1821 (Wilmington from 1822) | St. Armand[C] 1844
Keene[C] 1808 | North; Elba[C] 1849
Schroon[C] 1804 | Minerva[C] 1817
Newcomb[C] 1828
Moriah[C] 1808 | North; Hudson[C] 1848
Elizabethtown[B] 1798 | Westport[C] 1815

=== Notes ===
[A] = A part of Washington County.

[B] = A part of Clinton County until 1799, thereafter Essex County.

[C] = A part of Essex County.

== Clinton and Franklin counties ==
For further descendants see Essex; County
For antecendents see Essex; County | Willsboro[B] 1788
Peru[D] 1792 | Au Sable[D] 1839
Black; Brook[D] 1839
Champlain[D] 1788 | Mooers[D] 1804 | Ellenburg[D] 1830 | Clinton[D] 1845
Chazy[D] 1804 | Altona[D] 1857
Chateaugay[E] 1799 | Burke[F] 1844
Bellmont[F] 1833
Franklin[F] 1836 | Westville[F] 1829
Harrison 1805 (Ezraville from 1808; Malone[E] from 1812) | Constable[E] 1807 | Fort; Covington[F] 1817 | Bombay[F] 1833
Duane[F] 1828 | Brighton[F] 1858
Harrietstown[F] 1841
Dickinson[E] 1808 | Moira[E] 1828
Bangor[F] 1812 | Brandon[F] 1828 | Santa; Clara[F] 1888
Waverly[F] 1880 | Altamont; 1890 (Tupper; Lake[F] from 2004)

| Plattsburgh[A] township 1785-1788 | Plattsburgh[D] 1788 | Saranac[D] 1824 |
| | | Beekmantown[D] 1820 | Dannemora[D] 1854 |
| | | Schuyler; Falls[D] 1854 |
| | | Plattsburgh[D] City 1902 |

=== Notes ===
[A] = A part of Washington County.

[B] = A part of Clinton County until 1799, thereafter Essex County.

[C] = A part of Essex County.

[D] = A part of Clinton County.

[E] = A part of Clinton County until 1808, thereafter Franklin County.

[F] = A part of Franklin County.

== St Lawrence County ==
Lisbon[A] 1801 | Canton; 1805 | Waddington; 1859
Madrid; 1802 | Potsdam; 1806
Ogdensburg; City 1868
Oswegatchie; 1802 | Gouverneur; 1810 | Macomb; 1841
Morristown; 1821
De Kalb; 1806
De Peyster; 1825
Massena; 1802 | Stockholm; 1806 | Norfolk; 1823
Louisville; 1810 | Clifton; 1868 | Hermon; 1834
Brasher; 1825 | Lawrence; 1828 | Clare; 1880 | Hammond; 1827
Pierrepont; 1818 | Fowler; 1816 | Edwards; 1827
Hopkinton; 1805 | Russell; 1807 | Pitcairn; 1836
Rossie; 1813 | Fine; 1844
Piercefield; 1901
Parishville; 1818 | Colton; 1843

=== Notes ===
- Ten survey townships were created within Oneida, Herkimer, and Montgomery counties in what is today St. Lawrence County, and in 1801 they were combined into one town called Lisbon and made part of Clinton County. In 1802 Lisbon became the county of St Lawrence and three more towns were split from the original Lisbon.

[A] = A part of Clinton County until 1802, thereafter St. Lawrence County.

== Lewis County ==
Denmark[F] 1807
Whitestown[A] 1788 | Mexico[D] 1782 | Lowville[E] 1800 | Harrisburg[E] 1803
Champion[G] 1800 | Pinckney[F] 1808
Adams[G] 1802 | Harrison 1804 (Rodman[G] from 1808)
Turin[E] 1800 | Martinsburg[E] 1803 | High Market [F] 1852-1973
For further descendants see Central; New York | West; Turin[F] 1830 | Osceola[F] 1844
Montague[F] 1850
Steuben[B] 1792 | Leyden[C] 1797 | Lewis[F] 1852
Watson[F] 1821 | Brantingham; 1828 (Greig[F] from 1832) | Lyonsdale[F] 1873 | New; Bremen[F] 1848
Diana[F] 1830 | Croghan[F] 1841

=== Notes ===
[A] = A part of Montgomery County until 1791, Herkimer County from 1791 to 1798, then Oneida County from 1798.

[B] = A part of Herkimer County until 1798, Oneida County thereafter.

[C] = A part of Herkimer County until 1798, then Oneida County until 1805, thereafter Lewis County.

[D] = A part of Herkimer County until 1798, then Oneida County until 1816, thereafter Oswego County.

[E] = A part of Oneida County until 1805, thereafter Lewis County.

[F] = A part of Lewis County.

[G] = A part of Oneida County until 1805, thereafter Jefferson County.

== Jefferson County ==
Alexandria; 1821 | Theresa; 1841
Whitestown[A] 1788 | Steuben[B] 1792 | Leyden[C] 1797 | Brownville[E] 1802 | Le Ray; 1806 | Antwerp; 1810
Philadelphia; 1821 | Wilna; 1813
For further descendants see Central New York
Pamelia; 1819
Orleans; 1821
Mexico[D] 1792 | Malta 1804 (Lorraine[E] from 1808) | Worth; 1848
Champion[E] 1800 | For further descendants see Lewis County
Adams; 1802 | Harrison 1804 (Rodman from 1808) | For further descendants see Lewis County
Ellisburg; 1803 | Henderson; 1806 | Clayton; 1833
Watertown; 1800 | Watertown city 1869
Hounsfield; 1806
Rutland; 1802
Lyme; 1818 | Cape Vincent; 1849

=== Notes ===
[A] = A part of Montgomery County until 1791, Herkimer County from 1791 to 1798, then Oneida County from 1798.

[B] = A part of Herkimer County until 1798, Oneida County thereafter.

[C] = A part of Herkimer County until 1798, then Oneida County until 1805, thereafter Lewis County.

[D] = A part of Herkimer County until 1798, then Oneida County until 1816, thereafter Oswego County.

[E] = A part of Oneida County until 1805, thereafter Jefferson County.

[F] = A part of Jefferson County.

== See also ==
- Timeline of town creation in Downstate New York
- Timeline of town creation in the Hudson Valley
- Timeline of town creation in New York's Capital District
- Timeline of town creation in Central New York
