= Putnam Station, New York =

- Hamlet
- Location within New York Location within the United States
- Coordinates: 43°44′03″N 73°22′29″W
- Country: United States
- State: New York
- County: Washington
- Elevation: 118 ft (36 m)
- Time zone: UTC-5 (Eastern (EST))
  - Summer (DST): UTC-4 (EDT)
- ZIP code: 12861
- Area codes: 518 & 838
- GNIS feature ID: 972980

Putnam Station is a hamlet in the town of Putnam in Washington County, New York, United States. The community is located along southern Lake Champlain 12.4 miles (20.0 km) north of Whitehall. Putnam Station has a post office with ZIP code 12861, which opened on July 30, 1879.
