= Putnam, New York =

Town in Washington County, New York, US

Putnam
- Town
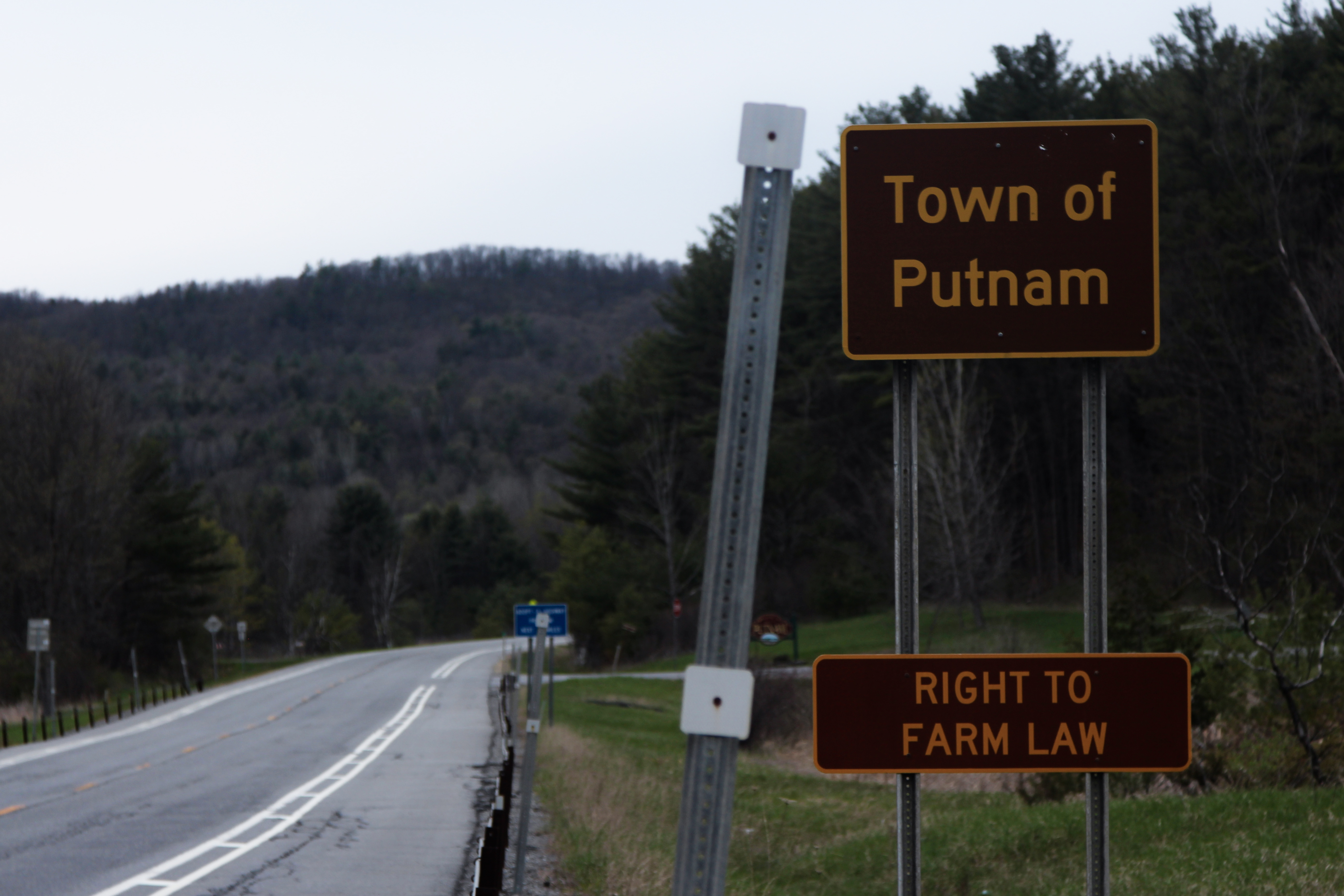

- Location in Washington County and the state of New York.
- Coordinates: 43°44′43″N 73°24′57″W
- Country: United States
- State: New York
- County: Washington

Area
  - Total: 35.42 sq mi (91.73 km^{2})
  - Land: 32.79 sq mi (84.93 km^{2})
  - Water: 2.63 sq mi (6.80 km^{2})
- Elevation: 873 ft (266 m)

Population (2010)
  - Total: 609
  - Estimate (2016): 583
  - Density: 17.8/sq mi (6.86/km^{2})
- Time zone: UTC-5 (Eastern (EST))
  - Summer (DST): UTC-4 (EDT)
- ZIP Code(s): 12861 (primary): 12861 Putnam Station; 12883 Ticonderoga
- Area code: 518
- FIPS code: 36-60092
- GNIS feature ID: 0979402
- Website: https://www.townofputnamny.com/

Putnam is a town in northern Washington County, New York, United States. It is part of the Glens Falls Metropolitan Statistical Area. The town population was 567 at the 2020 census. The town is named after Israel Putnam, a hero of the American Revolution.

== History ==
The town was part of the Provincial Patent (1764) made to officer veterans of the French and Indian War while the region was in Charlotte County. The town of Putnam was formed in 1806 from the town of Westfield (now Fort Ann).

The Hiram Congdon House was listed on the National Register of Historic Places in 1997.

== Geography ==
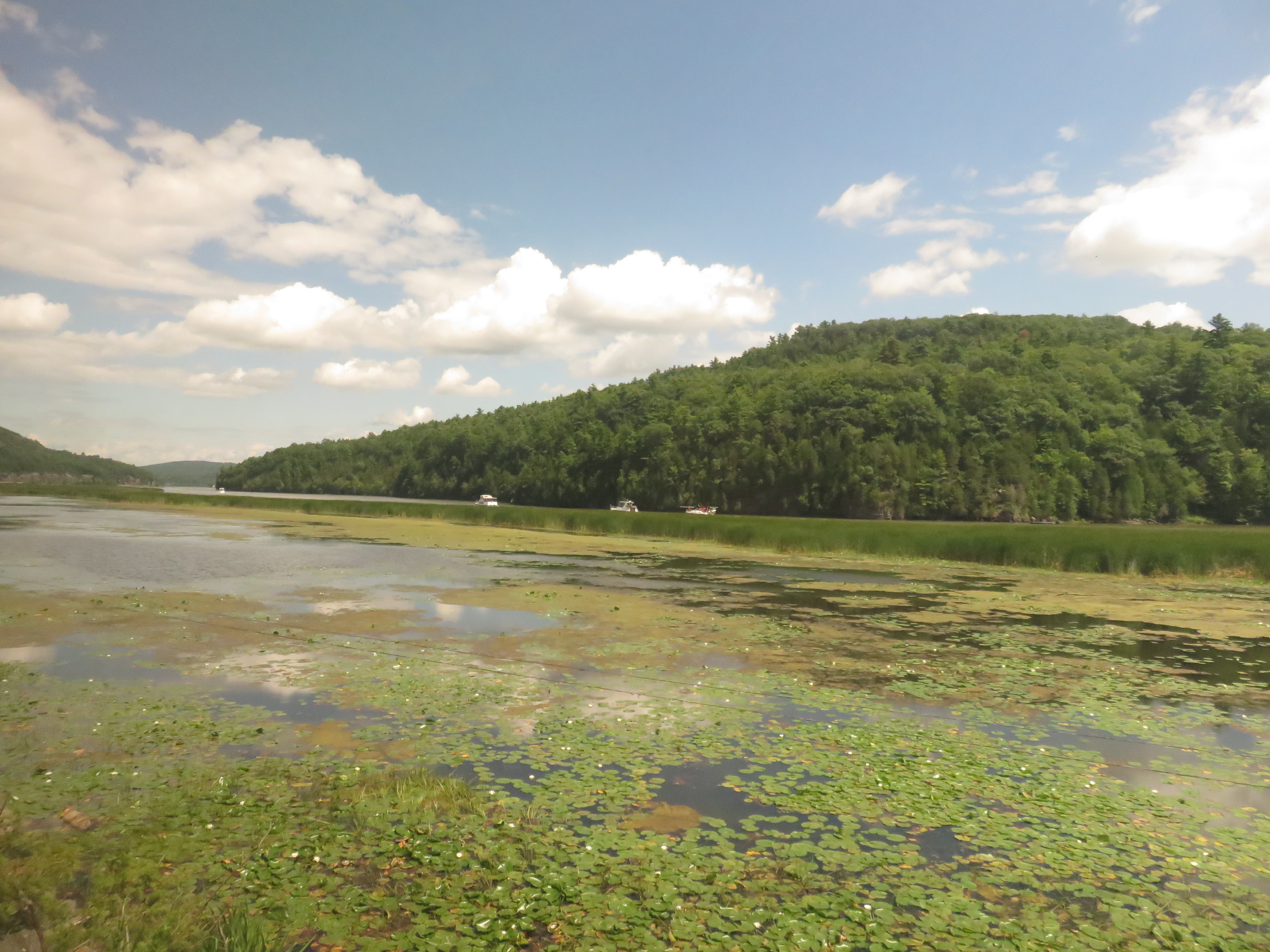
Lake Champlain near Putnam viewed from the Adirondack Amtrak train

According to the United States Census Bureau, the town has a total area of 35.5 square miles (92 km^{2}), of which 33.2 square miles (86 km^{2}) is land and 2.3 square miles (6.0 km^{2}) (6.49%) is water.

The northern town line is the border of Essex County. The eastern town boundary is defined by Lake Champlain and the border of Vermont. The western town line is defined by Lake George and Warren County. The town is located inside the Adirondack Park.

NY Route 22 is a north–south highway through the center of the town.

== Demographics ==
Historical population
Census	Pop.	Note	%±
1820	892		—
1830	718		−19.5%
1840	784		9.2%
1850	753		−4.0%
1860	754		0.1%
1870	603		−20.0%
1880	611		1.3%
1890	568		−7.0%
1900	505		−11.1%
1910	504		−0.2%
1920	528		4.8%
1930	479		−9.3%
1940	534		11.5%
1950	534		0.0%
1960	490		−8.2%
1970	579		18.2%
1980	506		−12.6%
1990	477		−5.7%
2000	645		35.2%
2010	609		−5.6%
2016 (est.)	583		−4.3%
U.S. Decennial Census

As of the census of 2000, there were 645 people, 248 households, and 181 families residing in the town. The population density was 19.5 people per square mile (7.5 people/km^{2}). There were 611 housing units at an average density of 18.4 units per square mile (7.1 units/km^{2}). The racial makeup of the town was 99.84% White and 0.16% Asian. Hispanic or Latino of any race were 1.24% of the population.

There were 248 households, out of which 31.0% had children under the age of 18 living with them, 63.3% were married couples living together, 6.0% had a female householder with no husband present, and 27.0% were non-families. 22.6% of all households were made up of individuals, and 11.7% had someone living alone who was 65 years of age or older. The average household size was 2.60 and the average family size was 3.07.

In the town, the population was spread out, with 24.7% under the age of 18, 6.4% from 18 to 24, 25.7% from 25 to 44, 28.4% from 45 to 64, and 14.9% who were 65 years of age or older. The median age was 40 years. For every 100 females, there were 106.7 males. For every 100 females age 18 and over, there were 105.1 males.

The median income for a household in the town was $51,000, and the median income for a family was $56,429. Males had a median income of $32,500 versus $28,125 for females. The per capita income for the town was $21,355. About 3.6% of families and 5.7% of the population were below the poverty line, including 9.2% of those under age 18 and 8.0% of those age 65 or over.

== Communities and locations in Putnam ==
- Adirondack Camp – A private sleepaway camp located south of Glenburnie by Lake George.
- Glenburnie – A hamlet on Lake George at Blairs Bay.
- Putnam – The hamlet of Putnam on NY-22 and County Road 2.
- Putnam Station – A hamlet in the vicinity of NY-22, County Routes 2 & 3 and Mill Bay
- Wright – A hamlet in the northeastern part of the town, on Lake Champlain.

=== Geographic locations ===
- Blairs Bay – A bay on the eastern side of Lake George at Glenburnie, bounded on the northern end by Anthony's Nose and on the southern by the Adirondack Camp peninsula.
- Brimstone Hill – An elevation east of Gull Bay, near the source of Charter Brook.
- Charter Brook – A stream entering Lake Champlain in the northern part of Putnam.
- Charter Brook Pond – A pond formed by a dam across Charter Brook, east of Blairs Bay.
- Gull Bay – A bay of Lake George, south of Camp Adirondack.
- Lamb Shanty Bay – A bay on Lake George in the southern part of Putnam.
- Mill Bay – A bay on Lake Champlain.
- Mill Brook – A stream in the southern part of the town that empties into Mill Bay.
- Mud Pond – A lake in the southwestern part of Putnam.
- Record Hill – An elevation north of Glenburnie.
- Skerrey Point – A projection into Lake George, forming part of Gull Bay.
- Smith Bay – A bay south of Skerrey Point.
- South Mountain – An elevation north of Record Hill.

== Education ==
Public education is provided by the Putnam Central School District, the borders of which are coterminous with the town's. The district has a five-member board of education. Putnam Central School is a K-6 school, and students of seventh grade and higher are bused to the nearby Ticonderoga High School in Ticonderoga.
