= York Shire =

Former county in the United States

York Shire (also known as the Shire of York and Yorkshire) was the first large governmental unit organized in the English Province of New York in North America soon after English control of the area was established in 1664.

== History ==
On August 29, 1664, The Duke of York’s forces captured New Amsterdam from the Dutch, as part of their conquest of New Netherland. They renamed New Netherland as the Province of New York, which included modern New York, New Jersey, Vermont, southeast Pennsylvania, and Delaware.

Yorkshire was created soon afterward in 1664. Its jurisdiction included Long Island, Staten Island, Manhattan Island, and the east side of the Hudson River coterminous with today's Bronx and Westchester.

Like the original Yorkshire in England for which it was named, Yorkshire, New York was divided into three ridings: East, West and North. Yorkshire's East Riding consisted of modern Suffolk County, its West Riding contained Staten Island, modern Brooklyn and modern Elmhurst, Queens (also known as Newtown), while its North Riding encompassed the rest of modern Queens, Nassau County, Westchester County and the Bronx, in addition to Manhattan, which is coterminous with the eponymous successor New York County.

On July 21, 1667, the Peace of Breda between England, France and the Netherlands confirmed the English conquest of New York from the Dutch in 1664.

As a result of renewed fighting between England and the Netherlands, the Dutch re-captured New York in August 1673. On September 12, 1673, New Netherland reverted the government structure in New Amsterdam.

On February 9, 1674, the Anglo-Dutch War was concluded with the Treaty of Westminster, the terms of which again transferred the territory to British control. The English reverted the organization to the one they previously established plus the take over of the governments the Dutch established in the interim.

On June 29, 1674, King Charles II of England granted the same territory previously granted to the Duke of York on March 12, 1663, including all territory previously in the Province of New York.

Yorkshire was eliminated on November 1, 1683, and the three ridings were converted into counties. The East Riding became Suffolk County, the West Riding became Richmond (Staten Island) and Kings (Brooklyn) counties, and the North Riding into Queens (including today's Nassau County), New York, and Westchester (including today's Bronx) counties.
