= Peru High School (New York) =

Peru Senior High School

Location
- 17 School St; Peru, (Clinton County), New York 12972; United States
- Coordinates: 44.5826°N 73.5345°W

Information
- School type: high school
- Motto: "Preparing our Students for Success"
- School district: Peru Central School District
- NCES District ID: 3622830
- Superintendent: Scott Storms
- CEEB code: 334490
- NCES School ID: 362283003209
- Principal: Matt Berry
- Faculty: 84.82 (FTE)
- Grades: 7–12
- Gender: Coeducational
- Enrollment: 1,014 (2018-19)
- Student to teacher ratio: 11.95
- Schedule: 7:28am-2:08pm
- Hours in school day: 7
- Colors: Blue, White, and Black

Peru Senior High School is a public high school located in Peru, Clinton County, New York, U.S.A., and is the only high school operated by the Peru Central School District.

In July 2020, the school board voted to retire the Indians mascot, replacing it with the Nighthawks in 2021.

The district (of which this is the sole comprehensive high school) includes the census-designated places of Peru and Parc, as well as a portion of the Morrisonville census-designated place. The district includes most of the Town of Peru as well as portions of the following towns: Au Sable, Black Brook, Plattsburgh, Saranac, and Schuyler Falls.

== Athletics ==
In 2001, the Peru High School football team was the class B New York State Champions.
