= Peru Central School District =

Public school district of Peru, New York

The Peru Central School District is the public school district of Peru, New York. The district is an independent public entity. The district operates two schools: Peru Elementary School, and Peru Junior/Senior High School. The campus also houses the ADK P-TECH program.

The district includes the census-designated places of Peru and Parc, as well as a portion of the Morrisonville census-designated place. The district includes most of the Town of Peru as well as portions of the following towns: Au Sable, Black Brook, Plattsburgh, Saranac, and Schuyler Falls.

In 2020, the school board voted to retire the district's Indians mascot, replacing it with Nighthawks in 2021.
