= Sarah Wool Moore =

American artist (1846–1911)

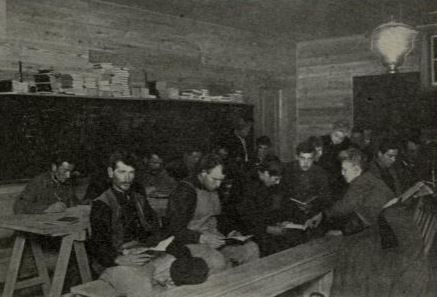
- Immigrant camp school house at Ashokan dam established by Sarah Wool Moore
- Born: May 3, 1846; Plattsburgh, Clinton County, New York
- Died: May 19, 1911 (aged 65); Valhalla, Westchester County, New York
- Occupation: teacher
- Years active: 1866–1911
- Known for: founding the Nebraska Art Association and the New York Society for Italian Immigrants

Sarah Wool Moore (1846–1911) was an artist and art teacher, as well as a language instructor, who was the first director of the Art Department at the University of Nebraska and founded the Nebraska Art Association. After leaving Nebraska, she taught in New York City. Disturbed by the intolerance shown to Italian immigrants, Moore worked as secretary of the New York Society for Italian Immigrants. In that capacity, she founded and taught at several language schools in New York and Pennsylvania to facilitate Italian immigrants learning of English. She also wrote English-Italian handbooks to help immigrants quickly learn the language they would use on a daily basis.

== Early life ==
Sarah Wool Moore was born on May 3, 1846, in Plattsburgh, Clinton County, New York to Charotte Elizabeth (née Mooers) and Amasa Corbin Moore. Her family were some of the most prominent citizens in Clinton County. Her father was an attorney, her paternal grandfather, Pliny Moore, had been a judge and was the first permanent settler of Champlain, New York. He had originally been from Sheffield, Massachusetts, and served in the American Revolutionary War. Pliny's wife, Mary Corbin, was the daughter of Captain John Corbin who had come to the area from Connecticut. Moore was the maternal granddaughter of Hannah (née Platt) and Benjamin Mooers, who was the founder of Beekmantown, New York. He was also the first sheriff of Clinton County and served as country treasurer for forty-two years. He served as an Assemblyman in the New York State Assembly for four terms and in the Senate for one term. He was a Major General in the War of 1812 and commanded the New York Militia at the Battle of Plattsburgh.

Moore grew up as one of ten children in the home known as General Mooer's House, which is now recognized with a New York State Historic Marker. She was the next to the youngest child in the family, but became the youngest child when her brother Arthur died just prior to his seventh birthday. She attended Packer Collegiate Institute, graduating in 1865.

== Career ==
For a decade she taught art and then between 1875 and 1884, Moore furthered her own education, traveling in Europe and studying for five years at the Academy of Fine Arts Vienna under the tutelage of August Eisenmenger. She returned to the United States and in 1884 became the head of the art department at the University of Nebraska. In addition to directing the department, she lectured on art history, drawing and painting. When she was hired, the art department was under the Agricultural Division of the Industrial College and Moore struggled to gain recognition for the department. Because the school did not authorize a fine arts college until 1912, the art and music teachers had to charge their students for classes. In 1888, Moore founded the Hayden Art Club, which would become the Nebraska Art Association, pioneering the art movement in the state. Resigning in 1892, she returned to New York, after presenting regent Charles Gere, founder of the Nebraska State Journal, with a portrait she had painted of him. In 1898, Moore began giving art classes and lectures in Brooklyn.

In 1900, Moore was the driving force in founding the Society for the Protection of Italian Immigrants (often called the Society for Italian Immigrants), which originally had goals to facilitate new Italian immigrants in their assimilation to a new country and help them navigate among steerers and labor bosses who wanted to profit off of their labor. These grifters recommended boarding houses or jobs in which they got kickbacks for placing boarders or workers. To combat them, Moore and other social workers for immigrants made lists of honest boarding houses and employers. They hired agents to meet immigrants' ships to avoid con men. Quickly, Moore recognized that without language skills, workers being hired in large numbers for infrastructure projects were at a disadvantage and needed to quickly learn the language of their new home. As secretary of the organization, Moore pressed for the development of schools in the labor camps. Her focus was on adult education and her innovative approach did not teach language in the same way that schools typically taught children.

In 1902, Moore published an English-Italian reader to assist immigrants in learning English. The book was described as a useful handbook to teach immigrants language they would need in their business dealings and daily lives. In 1905, she began a school at the Aspinwall labor camp, where laborers were working at the filtration plant. Teaching night courses to help the immigrant population learn English, as well as rudimentary writing, arithmetic and geography, Moore appealed to the state legislature for government funding to cover the costs of teaching. In the meantime, she led a campaign speaking at various churches and YWCA facilities to enlist both volunteers to assist with the teaching and make donations to support the schools. A bill was presented to the Pennsylvania House of Representatives in 1907 to authorize schools for labor camp workers if they made application to the local school boards for night classes. Expanding from the program developed for Aspinwall, Moore opened schools in the work camps at the Stoneco quarry in 1907; at Wappingers Falls; at Brown's Station, New York, for the Ashokan Reservoir; and in Valhalla for workers at the Kensico Reservoir. In 1907, Wool was given a commendation for her work in establishing schools by the Commissioner of Emigration for the Italian Ministry of Foreign Affairs and the Society for Italian Immigrants was recognized with an honorary award for assisting immigrants.

== Death and legacy ==
Moore died on May 19, 1911, in Valhalla, New York. In 1953, the Frank M. Hall Collection of contemporary art was shown at the University of Nebraska Galleries in Morrill Hall. The collection, known as one of the largest collections of American contemporary art owned by a university at that time, had begun when Moore taught a painting class to Anna Reed Hall and sparked her interest in collecting. Her work in the labor camps, inspired women's groups in Canada to propose similar educational facilities be established for their workers and in Pennsylvania, the bill that she urged appropriated $100,000 to establish 200 work camp schools for immigrants of various nationalities.

== Works ==
- Perrot, George (1900). Art history in the high school. Translated by Moore, Sarah Wool. Syracuse, New York: C. W. Bardeen. OCLC 16055376.
- Moore, Sarah Wool (November 10, 1901). "Must Help Italians Along". Brooklyn, New York: The Brooklyn Daily Eagle. p. 14 – via Newspapers.com.
- Moore, Sarah Wool (1902). An Illustrated English-Italian Language Book and Reader. Boston, Massachusetts: D.C. Heath & Company. OCLC 894204498.
- Moore, Sarah W. (March 1907). "Near Recollections: Notes on Camp School, No. 1, Aspinwall, Pennsylvania". The Survey. 17. East Stroudsburg, Pennsylvania: Survey Associates for the Charity Organization Society of the City of New York: 894–902.
- Moore, Sarah Wool (1908). Libro illustrato di lingua inglese: an illustrated English-Italian language book and reader. Boston, Massachusetts: D.C. Heath & Company. OCLC 30106548.
- Moore, Sarah Wool (June 4, 1910). "The Teaching of Foreigners". The Survey. 24. East Stroudsburg, Pennsylvania: Survey Associates for the Charity Organization Society of the City of New York: 386–392.
