= New York State Route 22B =

State highway in Clinton County, New York, US

New York State Route 22B
- NY 22B highlighted in red

Route information
- Auxiliary route of NY 22
- Maintained by NYSDOT
- Length: 10.90 mi (17.54 km)
- Existed: 1930s–present

Major junctions
- South end: NY 22 in Peru
- North end: NY 3 in Morrisonville

Location
- Country: United States
- State: New York
- Counties: Clinton

Highway system
- New York Highways; Interstate; US; State; Reference; Parkways
← NY 22A	→ NY 23

New York State Route 22B is a short north-south New York State Route located within Clinton County. Its northern terminus is located at a junction with NY 3 in the hamlet of Morrisonville, near Clinton County Airport. Its southern terminus is located at a junction with NY 22 in the hamlet of Peru. It was assigned as part of the 1930 renumbering of state highways in New York.

== Route description ==
NY 22B begins at NY 22 in Peru, just north of a bridge over the Little Ausable River. It briefly runs west until it reaches the grounds of the Peru Central School District building, and makes a sharp curve to the north at the intersection of Clinton County Route 37 (CR 37; River Road), replacing the trajectory of CR 39 (Jarvis Road). It continues north through farmland on the west side and forestland on the east side but briefly curves northeast and runs over a small bridge over Arnold Brook. North of that waterway farmland begins to run along both sides of the road, before the intersection with Broad Hollow Road, where it then makes another curve to the northwest before the intersection with Fox Farm Road. Along the way it turns north again as it passes a local Veterans of Foreign Wars post, then after the intersects a local road named Blake Road curves back to the northwest before the intersection with Mason Avenue just before entering the former village of Schuyler Falls. From that point it intersects the northern terminus of CR 40 then crosses a bridge over the Salmon River while curving from northwest to north-northwest before a brief overlap with CR 33 between Norrisville Road (which leads to Macomb State Park) and Salmon River Road.

North of the community, the route runs through more local farmland and at one point intersects the western terminus of CR 32, a road known as Irish Settlement Road, which leads to NY 22 at exit 36 on the Adirondack Northway and the western edge of the Plattsburgh International Airport. At the intersection with Broadwell Road, NY 22B enters the western edge of Morrisonville, where it turns northeast and after the intersection with CR 31 (Sand Road), and enters the community entirely as it runs along the southern banks of the Saranac River, shortly before crossing a bridge over that river just west of the intersection with CR 16 (Rand Hill Road). From there the road runs along the north bank of the Saranac, which almost meets the road again at the bridge over Mead Brook, then river turns away to the southeast. NY 22B continues to run relatively east as it passes the north side of the Clinton County Airport, and finally terminates at NY 3, which continues east towards the City of Plattsburgh.

== History ==
NY 22B was assigned as part of the 1930 renumbering of state highways in New York and first appears on the 1930 map.

The route continued east of Morrisonville as an overlap with NY 3 to Plattsburg, meeting its original northern terminus with NY 22 until the 1960's.

== Major intersections ==
The entire route is in Clinton County.

Location	mi	km	Destinations	Notes
Peru	0.00	0.00	NY 22 (Main Street) – Plattsburgh, Keeseville	Southern terminus; hamlet of Peru
Town of Plattsburgh	10.90	17.54	NY 3 (Cornelia Street) – Saranac Lake, Plattsburgh	Northern terminus; hamlet of Morrisonville
1.000 mi = 1.609 km; 1.000 km = 0.621 mi: Concurrency terminus
