= Silver Lake Bog Preserve =

- Silver Lake Bog
- Location within New York
- Nearest city: Black Brook
- Coordinates: 44.51°N 73.88°W
- Area: 98 acres (40 ha)
- Governing body: The Nature Conservancy
- Website: www.nature.org/en-us/get-involved/how-to-help/places-we-protect/adirondacks-silver-lake-bog-preserve/

The Silver Lake Bog Preserve is located in Clinton County, New York near Black Brook. The preserve is 98 acres (40 ha) and managed by The Nature Conservancy. In September 1985, a 2,000-foot (610 m) boardwalk was built in the preserve by a prison work detail.
