= British Hospital =

British Hospital may refer to:

- British Hospital (Montevideo), private hospital in Montevideo, Uruguay, established at its current location and name in 1913
- Hertford British Hospital, hospital founded in Paris in 1871 for British and other English-speaking patients, renamed in 2008
- British Hospital for Mothers and Babies, maternity hospital in south London from 1905 to 1984
- British Hospital (New York), in the list of New York State Historic Markers in Clinton County, New York

== See also ==
- British Hospitals Association
