= List of New York State Historic Markers in Clinton County, New York =

This is a complete list of New York State Historic Markers in Clinton County, New York.

== Listings county-wide ==
	Marker name	Image	Date designated	Location	City or Town	Marker text
1	Turnpike			On NYS 9N At Clintonville.	Ausable, New York	Port Kent to Hopkinton Built 1829-32. Via Ausable Forks, Black Brook, Franklin Falls, Loon Lake, St. Regis Falls, Hopkinton.
2	Underground Railroad Station			In Front of Green Apple Inn On Rte. 9 At Keeseville	Ausable, New York	Underground Railroad Station Where Negro Slaves Were Aided to Escape to Canada.
3	Turnpike			On NYS 9N At Clintonville.	Black Brook, New York	Port Kent to Hopkinton Built 1829-32. Via Ausable Forks, Black Brook, Franklin Falls, Loon Lake, St. Regis Falls, Hopkinton.
4	Turnpike			On County Rd. At Black Brook.	Black Brook, New York	Port Kent to Hopkinton Built 1829-32. Via Ausable Forks, Black Brook, Franklin Falls, Loon Lake, St. Regis Falls, Hopkinton.
5	Camp Ground			On Prospect St.	Champlain, New York	Of The British Army, 1814. Opposite Is The Farm of Pliny Moore, Built In 1808, And Used By The Commissary.
6	East Battery			On Pine St. At Champlain.	Champlain, New York	On This Hill Was Encamped The Artillery of The American Army Under Gen. George Izard 1814.
7	First School			On Oak St. At Champlain.	Champlain, New York	Which Stood Near This Site Dr. William Beaumont Surgeon And Physiologist Was Schoolmaster, 1807-10.
8	First Saw Mill			On US 11 At Western Edge of Village of Champlain.	Champlain, New York	Near This Site The First Saw Mill Was Erected In 1788 By Pliny Moore And Elnathan Rogers.
9	Site of Burying Yard			On Oak St. At. Champlain.	Champlain, New York	Site of Burying Yard In Which Was Interred Lt. Col. Benjamin Forsyth Killed At Odelltown, L.C. June 28, 1814.
10	Site of The Birthplace			On Oak St. At Champlain.	Champlain, New York	Jehudi Ashmun April 21, 1794 First Colonization Agent At Liberia, Africa 1822-1828.
11	First Bridge			On NYS 22 At Mooers.	Mooers, New York	Built On This Site Was For The Plattsburg-Montreal R.R. Helping to Bring Peace From Business Strife In The North Country.
12	First Town Meeting			On NYS 22 At Mooers.	Mooers, New York	Held In Home of John Shedden April 3, 1804. His Grandson, Lucien Love Shedden Was Regent of The University of The State of New York 1905-1912.
13	Mooers Junction			On NYS 22 At Mooers.	Mooers, New York	About 1850 Eating House Was East of This Site Where Plattsburg-Montreal And Ogdensburg-Lake Champlain Railroads Crossed.
14	Site of Home			On US 11 At Mooers.	Mooers, New York	Built Before 1804 By John Shedden Whose Barn Sheltered The First Quarterly Meetings of The Methodist Episcopal Church.
15	Site of Home			On NYS 22 At Mooers.	Mooers, New York	Lincoln Wigwam Between Main Street And R.R. Bridge On West Side. First Tavern, First Store In Town And Village of Mooers.
16	Town of Mooers			On NYS 22 At Mooers.	Mooers, New York	Formed By State Act From Champlain March 20, 1804. First Log Hut Ten Rods East, Also First Grist And Saw Mills.
17	To Site of Peru Blockhouse			On Tn. Rd. About 4 Miles East of Peru.	Peru, New York	One of Five Erected In Northern New York In 1794 As A Refuge For Settlers From Indian Attacks.
18	A Blockhouse			On Hamilton St.	Plattsburgh, New York	Used By American Army During Battle On Plattsburgh Stood Here In 1814.
19	British Hospital			At Intersection of Oak & Court Sts.	Plattsburgh, New York	The British Army Used The Basement of This House For A Hospital During Battle of Plattsburgh September, 1814.
20	First Building			At Intersection of Bridge And Charlotte Sts.	Plattsburgh, New York	Erected In This Settlement Stood Here In 1767. It Was The Home of Count Charles De Fredenburgh.
21	Headquarters			At Intersection, Cornelia St. And Cumberland Ave.	Plattsburgh, New York	British Officers During Battle of Plattsburgh, September, 1814.
22	Old Military Turnpike			On Cornelia St. At City Line.	Plattsburgh, New York	Plattsburg to Hopkinton Via Ellenburg, Chateaugay, Malone. Begun By military labor in 1817. Completed 1826.
23	Site of Home			At Intersection of Hamilton And Jay Sts.	Plattsburgh, New York	Zethaniah Platt 1735-1807 Founder of Plattsburgh Built In 1799.
24	Baker Burying Ground			On NYS 3 About 1/2 Mile East of West Plattsburgh.	Plattsburgh, New York	Here Lie Six Revolutionary Soldiers And Many Pioneers of Clinton County.
25	Home of John Addams			On Co. Rd. Cumberland Head.	Plattsburgh, New York	Home of John Addams Built 1790 Major And Surveyor During Entire Period of Revolution.
26	Home of General Benjamin Mooers			On Co. Rd. Cumberland Head.	Plattsburgh, New York	General Benjamin Mooers 1758-1838 Veteran of Revolution And War of 1812.
27	Macdonough Farm			On Co. Rd. On Cumberland Head.	Plattsburgh, New York	Presented to Commodore Thomas Macdonough By The State of Vermont For His Victory Battle of Plattsburgh, 1814.
28	Old Military Turnpike			On Old Military Turnpike About 4 Miles N.W. of Plattsburgh.	Plattsburgh, New York	Formerly An Indian Trail In 1817 Made A Military Turnpike By President James Monroe.
29	Old Military Turnpike			At Intersection of NYS 3 And Old Military Turnpike About 2 Miles West of Pl.	Plattsburgh, New York	Plattsburh to Hopkinton Via Ellenburg, Chateaugay, Malone. Begun By military labor in 1817. Completed 1826.
30	TRAIN STATION			Next to historic railroad station on Bridge Street.	Plattsburgh, New York	Delaware & Hudson Canal Co. constructed this depot in 1886. Designed by NY architect Albert W. Fuller. Building Renovated in 1983.
31	Woolsey Mansion			On Co. Rd. On Cumberland Head.	Plattsburgh, New York	Built before 1800 Melancton Lloyd Woolsey 1758-1819 First Collector of Customs First County Clerk.

== See also ==
- List of New York State Historic Markers
- National Register of Historic Places listings in New York
- List of National Historic Landmarks in New York
