= New York State Route 442 =

State highway in Clinton County, New York, US

New York State Route 442
- Bear Swamp Road
- Map of Clinton County in northeastern New York with NY 442 highlighted in red

Route information
- Maintained by NYSDOT
- Length: 3.95 mi (6.36 km)
- Existed: April 1970–present

Major junctions
- West end: NY 22 in Peru
- I-87 in Peru
- East end: US 9 in Peru

Location
- Country: United States
- State: New York
- Counties: Clinton

Highway system
- New York Highways; Interstate; US; State; Reference; Parkways
← NY 441	→ NY 443

New York State Route 442 (NY 442) is a state highway located within the town of Peru in Clinton County, New York, in the United States. It is an east–west highway that connects the hamlet of Peru with the Adirondack Northway (Interstate 87). The western terminus of the route is at an intersection with NY 22 in the hamlet of Peru. Its eastern terminus is at a junction with US 9 near the shore of Lake Champlain. NY 442 was assigned in April 1970 as a town-maintained, state-numbered route. It became state-maintained in 1988.

== Route description ==
NY 442 begins at an intersection with NY 22 (Main Street) in the hamlet of Peru within the town of the same name. The route heads eastward, intersecting with local roads before leaving Peru. For a brief distance, NY 442 and NY 22 parallel, but NY 22 turns to the north while NY 442 continues eastward. Soon after the intersection with Dashnaw Road, NY 442 connects with the Adirondack Northway (I-87) by way of an interchange (exit 35). The highway heads through the small hamlet of Laphams Mills and terminates at an intersection with US 9 (the Lakes to Locks Passage), just east of Ausable Point and west of Lake Champlain.

== History ==
NY 442 was assigned to its current alignment in April 1970. Although it was signed as a state route, NY 442 was initially maintained by the town of Peru. On September 1, 1988, ownership and maintenance of NY 442 was transferred from the town to the state of New York as part of a highway maintenance swap between the town, the state, and Clinton County. In exchange, the state ceded maintenance of NY 22 north of US 11 in Mooers to the county.

== Major intersections ==
The entire route is in Peru, Clinton County.

mi	km	Destinations	Notes
0.00	0.00	NY 22 (Main Street)	Western terminus; hamlet of Peru
1.08	1.74	I-87 to A-15	Exit 35 (I-87)
3.95	6.36	US 9 (Lakes to Locks Passage) – Ausable Chasm, Ferry to Vermont	Eastern terminus
1.000 mi = 1.609 km; 1.000 km = 0.621 mi
