= James Henry Lockwood =

American politician and pioneer (1793–1857)

James H. Lockwood
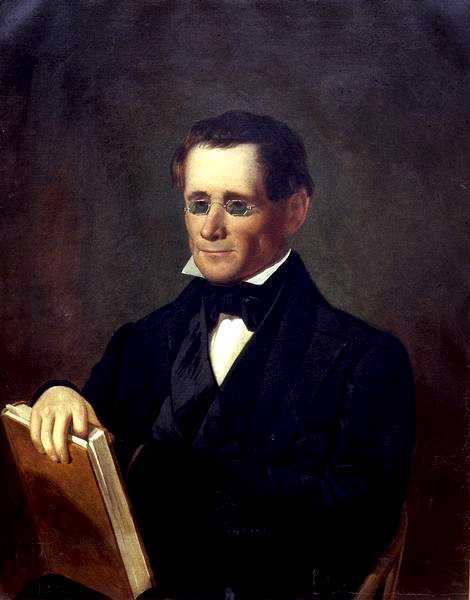
- 1856 portrait by Samuel Marsden Brookes and Thomas H. Stevenson

Member of the House of Representatives of the Wisconsin Territory from the Crawford district
- In office October 25, 1836 – November 6, 1837
- Preceded by: Position established
- Succeeded by: Jean Brunet

Personal details
- Born: December 7, 1793 Peru, New York, U.S.
- Died: August 24, 1857 (aged 63) Prairie du Chien, Wisconsin
- Resting place: Evergreen Cemetery, Prairie du Chien, Wisconsin
- Party: Whig
- Spouses: Julia Ann Warren (m. 1822; died 1827); Sarah Ann Wright (m. 1834–1857)

James Henry Lockwood (December 7, 1793 – August 24, 1857) was an American merchant, lawyer, and Wisconsin pioneer. He was the first permanent resident to practice law within what is now the state of Wisconsin.

== Early life and education ==
John Henry Lockwood was born in Peru, New York. When he was a small child, his father's home in Peru caught fire and everything of value was lost. They moved to the nearby community of Jay, New York, where his father owned a piece of land. After constructing some improvements, his father sold the farm in Jay and moved the family to a new plot of land in Champlain, New York, in 1805. In the summers, John worked on his father's farms, and in the winters attended school in the neighboring village of Chazy. In 1808, he boarded at Champlain, New York, and attended a school taught by William Beaumont, which he credited as greatly improving his grammar and general knowledge. At 17 he began studying law, but quickly decided it was not suitable for him. He instead went to work as a merchant's clerk.

== Suttling for the Army ==
At the outbreak of the War of 1812, his employer became a sutler for the United States Army attached to the command of General George Izard. Lockwood stayed with the army as a sutler through the end of the Niagara campaign, and went into winter quarters with the army at Buffalo, New York. After a dispute with his employer, he quit that position and went to work for another sutler, this one attached to the 2nd Regiment of Light Dragoons at Avon, New York.

While there, in April 1815, he received a letter from Louis Rouse, a merchant from Green Bay, offering to employ Lockwood as his assistant suttling for the Consolidated Regiment of Riflemen. Lockwood departed Avon and traveled to Buffalo, arriving with the news that the war was ended. In June, Lockwood and Rouse departed Buffalo for Detroit aboard the USS Lady of the Lake. Finding the regiment had already proceeded to Mackinac Island, they continued their journey. From Detroit, they shared a schooner with trader Ramsay Crooks on a trade assignment for John Jacob Astor. They arrived at Mackinac Island on August 15. Business was slow through the winter as ice prevented additional shipping. At the request of some of the French-speaking inhabitants, Lockwood taught lessons that winter in English.

In 1816, the 3rd U.S. Infantry Regiment was ordered to proceed to Green Bay to construct a fort and establish a garrison. They travelled in three schooners and Lockwood joined them as suttler aboard the Washington. During the trip the two other ships became separated and the Washington waited for them on an island in the strait between the Green Bay and Lake Michigan. While there, they named the island for their ship—Washington Island.

They arrived at the small trade depot of Green Bay in July 1816, where the regiment set about establishing a fort—later known as Fort Howard. Lockwood joined trade expeditions of the American Fur Company up the Fox River, eventually making it to Prairie du Chien—the only other significant American settlement which then existed within the boundaries of what would later become the state of Wisconsin. Lockwood traveled the territory these years, but spent most of his time near the mouth of the Minnesota River (then known as "St. Peter's River"), where he had become involved in the fur trade with the Sioux.

== Public service career ==
In Spring 1819, Crawford County was legally established under the new Michigan Territory. John W. Johnston, previously an Indian agent at Prairie du Chien, was named chief justice of Crawford County, and Lockwood was offered the role of associate justice or probate judge. Lockwood refused the judgeship, but accepted an offer to become justice of the peace instead. He established his residence at Prairie du Chien in the Fall of 1819.

When United States federal judge James Duane Doty arrived in the territory and found not a single practicing lawyer, he encouraged Lockwood to resume his legal studies under his tutelage and offered his entire legal library for education. In May 1824, at the first session of the court at Prairie du Chien, Lockwood was admitted to the bar and named prosecuting attorney. Later that year he was also named the first postmaster. In 1830, he was named associate justice for Crawford County.

Lockwood's home was the first frame house in Prairie du Chien, one wing of the house served as retail space. The house was later occupied by Colonel Zachary Taylor when he was commander of the garrison at Fort Crawford.

After the organization of the Wisconsin Territory, Lockwood was elected as one of Crawford's two representatives to the 1st Legislative Assembly of the Wisconsin Territory, which met at Belmont, Wisconsin, in the winter of 1836–1837.

In 1856, Lockwood wrote a narrative of his experiences entitled Early Times and Events in Wisconsin for the Wisconsin Historical Society.

He died at Prairie du Chien, Wisconsin, in 1857.
