= Clinton County Airport =

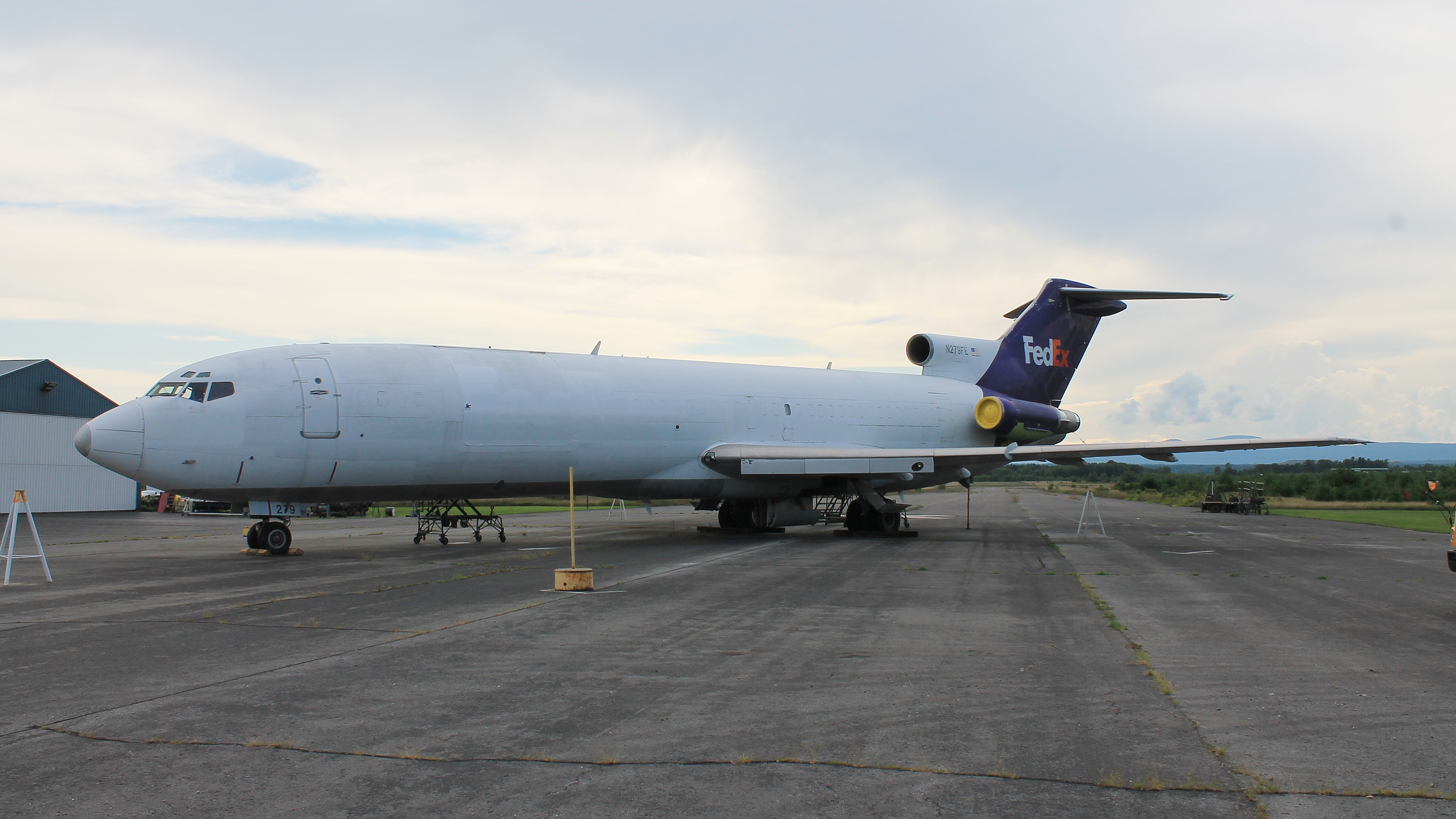
- Former FedEx Boeing 727 on the closed runway 27 in August 2018.
- IATA: ~~PLB~~; ICAO: ~~KPLB~~; FAA LID: ~~PLB~~

Summary
- Airport type: Public
- Owner: Clinton County
- Serves: City of Plattsburgh, New York
- Location: Town of Plattsburgh, New York
- Elevation AMSL: 371 ft (113 m)
- Coordinates: 44°41′15″N 073°31′28″W

Map
- Interactive map of Clinton County Airport

Runways
Direction	Length		Surface
Direction	ft	m	Surface
1/19	5,000	1,524	Asphalt
14/32	5,000	1,524	Asphalt

Statistics (2006)
- Aircraft operations: 14,150
- Based aircraft: 30
- Source: Federal Aviation Administration

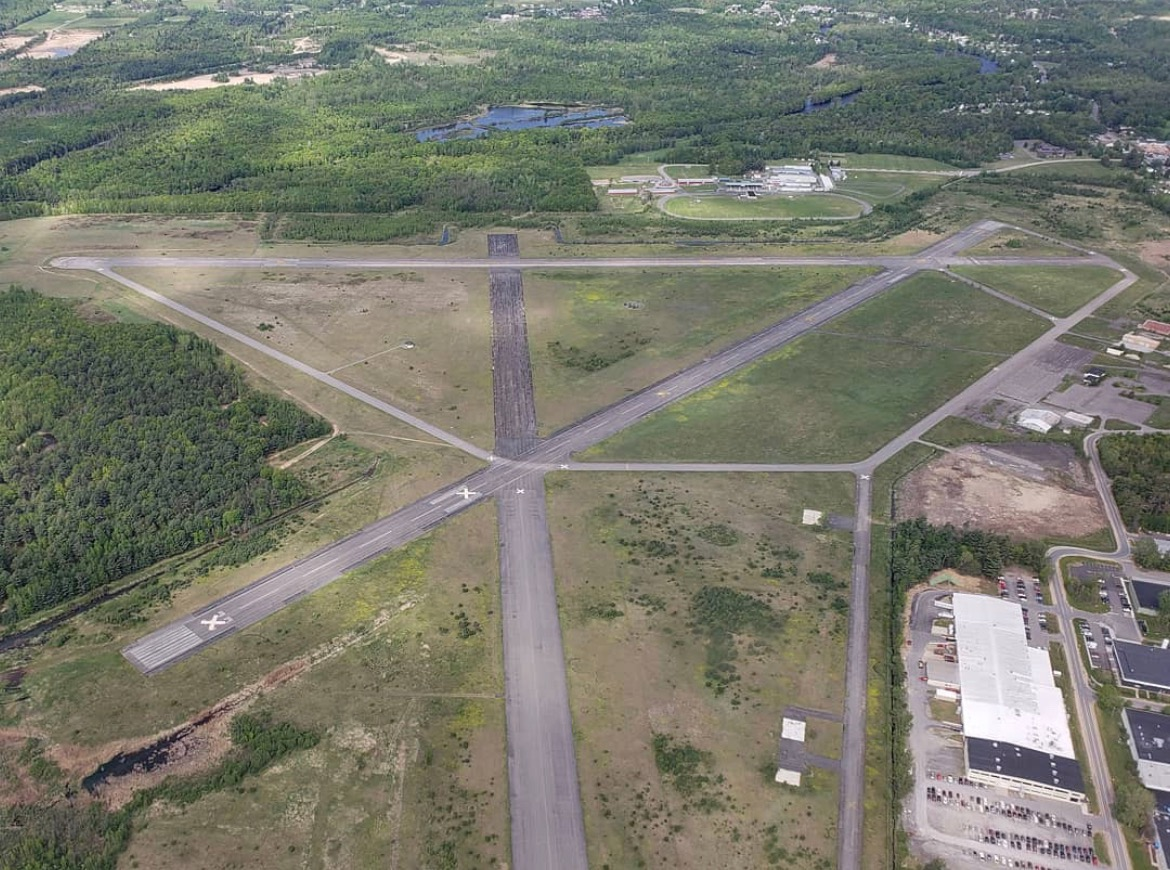
Clinton County Airport Aerial View - May 24, 2018

Clinton County Airport (IATA: ~~PLB~~, ICAO: ~~KPLB~~, FAA LID: ~~PLB~~) is a former county-owned public-use airport in Clinton County, New York, United States. It is located 3 nautical miles (5.6 km; 3.5 mi) west of the central business district of the city of Plattsburgh. It served Plattsburgh and the western side of Lake Champlain.

Clinton County transitioned to using the nearby Plattsburgh International Airport (44°39′03″N 073°28′05″W) as the primary airport for the region on June 18, 2007, and Clinton County Airport is now officially closed to itinerant aircraft, though it is still used for paradrops, and a few aircraft are still based there.

As per Federal Aviation Administration records, the airport had 1,712 passenger boardings (enplanements) in calendar year 2004 and 1,747 enplanements in 2005. According to the FAA's National Plan of Integrated Airport Systems for 2007–2011, Clinton County was categorized as a general aviation airport because the commercial service category required at least 2,500 passenger boardings per year.

In 1972, a FB-111A Aardvark landed at the airport after the pilot mistook the runway for the airport as being the nearby Plattsburgh Air Force Base.

== Facilities and aircraft ==
Clinton County Airport covers an area of 990 acres (400 ha) at an elevation of 371 ft (113 m) above mean sea level. It has two runways; the primary instrument runway is runway 1-19. An instrument landing system is installed on the north-facing runway 1. Runway 1 is also equipped with a medium intensity approach lighting system. A VOR is located on the field and provides a non-precision instrument approach to runway 19. Both runway 1-19 and runway 14-32 are 5,000 ft (1,500 m) in length and 100 ft (30 m) wide. The landing threshold to runway 19 is displaced 635 ft (194 m) for landing due to trees north of the airport. A third, east–west runway, now abandoned, existed during the 1980s.

For the 12-month period ending October 24, 2006, the airport had 14,150 aircraft operations, an average of 38 per day: 78% general aviation and 22% air taxi. At that time there were 30 aircraft based at this airport: 83% single-engine, 13% multi-engine and 3% jet.
