= Frank A. Anson =

American businessman and politician

Frank Amos Anson (March 8, 1844 – December 12, 1909) was an American businessman and politician.

Born in Peru, New York, Anson was a sailor on the Great Lakes. He then settled in Montpelier, Vermont and was a store clerk. During this time, Anson served in the 11th Vermont Infantry during the American Civil War. In 1866 and 1867, Anson worked in Whitehall, New York. In 1868, Anson moved to Milwaukee, Wisconsin and was one of the owners of: Anson Brothers which was a wholesale grocery business. In 1895 and 1897, Anson served in the Wisconsin State Assembly and was a Republican. Then, from 1899 to 1903, Anson served in the Wisconsin State Senate. Anson died of heart failure at his home in Milwaukee, Wisconsin.
