= Plattsburgh International Airport =

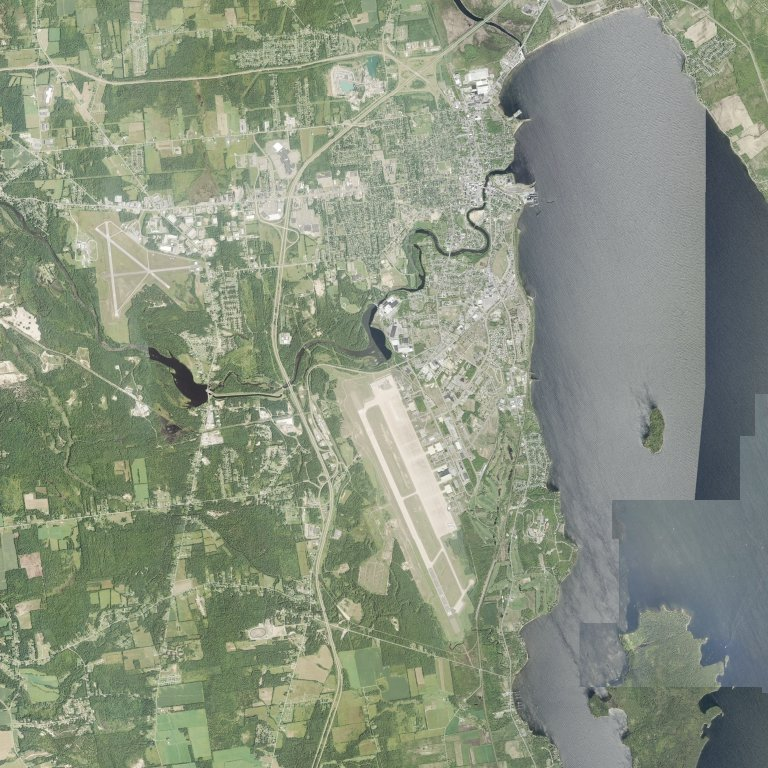
- USGS orthophoto; the now-closed Clinton County Airport appears above and to the left.
- IATA: PBG; ICAO: KPBG; FAA LID: PBG

Summary
- Airport type: Public
- Owner: Clinton County
- Serves: Plattsburgh, New York; Northern Adirondacks; Montreal
- Location: Town of Plattsburgh, NY
- Elevation AMSL: 234 ft (71 m)
- Coordinates: 44°39′03″N 073°28′05″W
- Website: flyplattsburgh.com

Maps
- FAA airport diagram
- Interactive map of Plattsburgh International Airport

Runways
Direction	Length		Surface
Direction	ft	m	Surface
17/35	11,759	3,584	Asphalt/concrete

Statistics (2018)
- Aircraft operations: 12,781
- Based aircraft: 30
- Source: Federal Aviation Administration

Plattsburgh International Airport (IATA: PBG, ICAO: KPBG, FAA LID: PBG) is a county public-use airport located three nautical miles (6 km) south of the central business district of the city of Plattsburgh, within the Town of Plattsburgh in Clinton County, New York, United States. About 85 percent of the airport's passengers in 2013 were Canadians, mostly from Montreal.

The airport is located at the former Plattsburgh Air Force Base and has been owned by Clinton County since 2002. The old base is still being redeveloped by Plattsburgh Airbase Redevelopment Corporation (PARC), established in 1995 after the airbase closed. The airport's massive facilities have been upgraded to civilian aviation standards and the county fully transitioned here from Clinton County Airport as of June 2007.

Passenger service began on June 18, 2007, and Clinton County Airport has been shut down since then. All airline service in Plattsburgh goes through the airport, which has expanded its terminal building to accommodate more passengers and provide more gates for aircraft. Scheduled passenger service from this airport to Washington, DC is subsidized by the United States Department of Transportation via the Essential Air Service program.

The airport was closed to air traffic from April 13, 2021, to approximately June 22, 2021, due to the middle section of the runway being repaved.

It is included in the National Plan of Integrated Airport Systems for 2011–2015, which categorized it as a primary commercial service airport (more than 10,000 enplanements per year). As per Federal Aviation Administration records, the airport had 45,998 passenger boardings (enplanements) in 2008, 73,159 enplanements in 2009, 94,808 in 2010, and 139,698 in 2011.

== History ==
Plattsburgh Air Force Base closed on September 25, 1995, pursuant to the Defense Base Realignment and Closure Act of 1990 and the recommendations of the Base Realignment and Closure Commission.

After the base was decommissioned, Plattsburgh Airbase Redevelopment Corporation was created to manage the 5,000-acre (20 km^{2}) property. The Plattsburgh Airbase Redevelopment Corporation split up the base into 165 parcels for redevelopment.

The idea of opening a new commercial airport at the site of the former Plattsburgh Air Force Base dated back to at least 2000. At the time, the United States Air Force (USAF) still owned the runway, which made converting it into a civilian airport more difficult. Plattsburgh Airbase Redevelopment Corporation and Plattsburgh-North Country Chamber of Commerce both favored the opening of a new commercial airport and closing the old Clinton County Airport. The county voted in favor of the move on July 13, 2000. County legislators held a public hearing about the idea on December 12, 2001; most of the residents who spoke at the meeting were in favor of the idea.

In September 2003, the Federal Aviation Administration awarded Plattsburgh International Airport $624,200 of funding to build a passenger terminal. In November 2003, the federal transportation funding bill included $2 million for the passenger terminal. A grant from the Federal Aviation Administration funded security improvements in August 2004.

In 2004, Precision Jet was nearly selected to operate the new airport, but the county decided not to approve the contract because of a lack of detail in the business plan, concerns about whether the Federal Aviation Administration would approve the proposed terminal, questions about whether it was legal to give the company exclusive development rights, and concerns that delegating all control over decisions could negatively impact the county's long-term economic future. On March 1, 2005, the county ended its contract with Plattsburgh Airbase Redevelopment Corporation to operate the airport.

Congress voted to approve a $721,000 grant for Essential Air Service for Plattsburgh International Airport in November 2004. The airport received another $1.6 million of federal funding for runway construction in March 2005 and $2.6 million of federal funding for construction of the terminal in April 2005. The county was approved for $500,000 of federal funding to construct an access road to the airport in August 2005.

The airport's official groundbreaking was held on August 17, 2005, and it officially opened on April 26, 2006.

== Airport facilities ==
Plattsburgh International Airport's facilities include a 11,759-foot (3,584 m) runway and a 12,000,000-square-foot (1,100,000 m^{2}) concrete ramp for cargo and aircraft. Plattsburgh also has no night curfews or flight restrictions and enjoys calm weather year-round (97% VMC). It is also a Foreign Trade Zone and Empire Zone, making it a virtually tax free zone for many enterprises.

The airport promotes itself as l'aéroport américain de Montréal ("Montreal's American Airport"). Montreal does not have a tertiary passenger airport in Canada; Plattsburgh is 60 miles (97 km) from the city, and the South Shore suburbs are closer to Plattsburgh airport than they are to Montreal-Trudeau International Airport. As of 2015, more than 80% of passengers are Canadians who drive across the border into the U.S. so they can take domestic flight to American destinations. All signs are bilingual in English and French, and workers are offered French classes. The airport has significant multi-modal capabilities, including its own interchange on the Interstate Highway System (Exit 36 of I-87), a direct rail spur from the main Canadian Pacific Railway line between Montreal and New York City, and direct rail and highway access to the Port of Montreal.

== Facilities and aircraft ==
Plattsburgh International Airport covers an area of 1,912 acres (774 ha) at an elevation of 234 feet (71 m) above mean sea level. It has one runway designated 17/35 with an asphalt/concrete surface measuring 11,759 by 200 feet (3,584 x 61 m).

The airport has a 35,300 square foot passenger terminal building that opened in 2007. Before 2007 the airport's main structures were the old Strategic Air Command alert facility (also known as "Mole Hole") on the north end and the control tower and base operations building in the southeast end. The passenger facility has limited services beyond the airlines, along with a snack booth and food stand. Various former Air Force hangars are located along the tarmac, with largest being 28,000 square feet. The air traffic control tower is located separately, but is currently not functional (i.e., the airport is currently an uncontrolled airport, limited to UNICOM only).

Aircraft rescue and fire fighting is provided by the airport with a fire station utilizing the former USAF fire station adjacent to the old control tower. The department uses former military airport tenders and has a newer Rosenbauer Panther 6x6 (delivered in 2009).

As of 2016 Plattsburgh Airport had about 140,000 passengers enplane annually. The Federal Aviation Administration forecasts 300,000 passengers annually by 2030, in part because of Canadian use. For the 12-month period ending June 30, 2018, the airport had 12,781 aircraft operations, an average of 35 per day: 55% general aviation, 23% air taxi, 21% scheduled commercial, and 2% military. At that time there were 30 aircraft based at this airport: 20 single-engine, 7 multi-engine, 2 jet, and 1 helicopter.

== Airlines and destinations ==
Domestic destinations from Plattsburgh International Airport
Red = Year-round destination
Green = Seasonal destination

On September 5, 2007, Las Vegas-based airline Allegiant Air announced that it would offer non-stop flights from Plattsburgh International Airport to Fort Lauderdale-Hollywood International Airport, in Fort Lauderdale, Florida, aboard McDonnell-Douglas MD-80 variants. The service began on November 16, 2007. The airline cited Plattsburgh as an ideal location due to its proximity to Montreal and Burlington, Vermont. Allegiant operates a similar situation with Bellingham International Airport in Bellingham, Washington, which is close to Vancouver. In response to their tremendous success within the region, Allegiant began non-stop service to Las Vegas, Nevada and Punta Gorda, Florida. Las Vegas service ended in March 2014. Airbus A319s & A320s fly the bulk of Allegiant Air routes out of Plattsburgh.

On March 15, 2008, the airport began hosting regular service by Direct Air, offering three direct flights weekly to Myrtle Beach, South Carolina. The charter airline already had a successful service to Myrtle Beach from Niagara Falls, which has drawn many passengers from Ontario just as Plattsburgh is now doing from Quebec. On April 29, 2011, the airline announced it would offer two non-stop flights per week, departing and returning on Wednesdays and Saturdays, to Lakeland Linder International Airport beginning November 10, 2011, using Boeing 737-400 aircraft. The reason Direct had chosen Lakeland as its latest destination was its proximity to both Orlando and Tampa. Direct Air planned to make flights to and from San Juan, Puerto Rico, starting on May 2, 2012. On March 13, 2012, Direct Air ceased operations. The charter carrier was subject to Chapter 7 liquidation on April 12, 2012.

The airport was served by Colgan Air until June 14, 2012, offering up to three flights daily to Boston on a variety of turboprop regional airliners. After Colgan Air went defunct, the relatively unknown Alaska-based airline PenAir was chosen as its replacement when the airline decided to serve destinations in the northeastern United States. PenAir serves Plattsburgh similarly with two to three daily flights to Boston Logan International Airport, exclusively using Saab 340 aircraft. PenAir's flights to Boston were subsidized by the Essential Air Service program. PenAir's contract for subsidized flights to Plattsburgh ended on June 30, 2018 and was replaced by SkyWest Airlines services operating as United Express to Washington-Dulles International Airport in August 2018.

The airport was also served by Spirit Airlines with non-stop service to Fort Lauderdale and seasonal non-stop flights to Myrtle Beach. Also, it was reported on January 13, 2012, via WPTZ that the airport was planning on expanding by building a new two-story terminal with six additional jetways, along with expanded parking, ticket counters, baggage claims and security checkpoints which is estimated to cost more than $40 million. On September 18, 2012, the airport received more than $6.5 million in federal grants to use toward infrastructure improvements that should start early 2013. Spirit left Plattsburgh in 2020 during the Coronavirus pandemic.

Champlain Enterprises successfully restored a vintage 1943 Douglas DC-3 aircraft, which made its first post-restoration flight on June 2, 2006. The aircraft was housed in the former Plattsburgh Air Force Base Auxiliary hangar on the south side of the airports tarmac. It made regular air show appearances throughout the northeast U.S. for the following years, flying out of both Plattsburgh and Morrisonville, before the aircraft was purchased by Basler Turbo Conversions on March 8, 2013; it is currently based at BTC headquarters in Oshkosh, Wisconsin at Wittman Regional Airport.

The airport underwent a $55 million expansion with a two-story departure terminal with three new gates, bringing the total number of gates to four, an expanded ticket counter, and larger baggage claim, among other improvements which would help the airport keep up with its growth.

As of 2019, the expanded concourse has three gates with jetways and a fourth gate that can have one added with increased service. A new customs facility was due to be opened in 2019.

On January 14, 2022, regional airline SkyWest Air announced its intentions to cut subsidized service to Plattsburgh. Due to the sudden nature of the cancellations, a new bidding process began for a replacement airline.

On May 10, 2022, Contour Airlines was chosen as the replacement with 12 weekly flights to Philadelphia. In May 2025, the service transitioned from Philadelphia to Washington-Dulles.

From November 2023, Breeze Airways served Plattsburgh from Orlando International Airport, but the service ended in May 2025. The airline also briefly served Tampa from Plattsburgh.

Airlines	Destinations
Allegiant Air	Fort Lauderdale, Orlando/Sanford; Seasonal: Punta Gorda (FL), St. Petersburg/Clearwater
Contour Airlines	Washington–Dulles

== Statistics ==
=== Top destinations ===
Busiest domestic routes from PBG (August 2025 – July 2026)
Rank	City	Passengers	Carriers
1	Fort Lauderdale, Florida	23,020	Allegiant
2	Orlando/Sanford, Florida	22,120	Allegiant
3	St. Petersburg/Clearwater, Florida	15,080	Allegiant
4	Washington–Dulles, Virginia	10.400	Contour
5	Punta Gorda, Florida	3,110	Allegiant
6	Myrtle Beach, South Carolina	1,120	Allegiant

=== Airline shares ===
Top airlines at PBG (August 2025 – July 2026)
Rank	Airline	Passengers	Share
1	Allegiant Air	128,000	85.78%
2	Contour Airlines	21,200	14.22%

== See also ==
- Clinton County Airport
- List of airports in New York

Other airports that target Canadian travelers as alternatives to their local airport(s):

- Albany International Airport - another alternative to the above
- Ogdensburg International Airport – alternative to airport in Ottawa (Ottawa-Macdonald)
- Bellingham International Airport - alternative to Vancouver

== Bibliography ==
- Construction of new Clinton County airport ready to take off]. Press-Republican. July 13, 2005.
- Increased air service is possible. Press-Republican. May 30, 2007.
- Plattsburgh airline pulling out. Press-Republican. December 19, 2007.
- Frugal Quebecers flocking to nearby U.S. airports. The Montreal Gazette. July 5, 2008.
- Airport Committee endorses expansion conceptual plan. Press-Republican. December 29, 2011.
- Plattsburgh Airport Expansion. WPTZ. January 13, 2012.
- Essential Air Service documents (Docket OST-2003-14783) from the U.S. Department of Transportation:
  - Order 2006-7-12 (July 10, 2006): re-selecting Champlain Enterprises, Inc. d/b/a CommutAir, operating as Continental Connection, to provide subsidized essential air service (EAS) at Plattsburgh and Saranac Lake/Lake Placid, New York, at an annual subsidy rate of $1,706,755 for the two-year period of September 1, 2006, through August 31, 2008.
  - Order 2007-9-13 (September 13, 2007): selecting Big Sky Transportation Co., d/b/a Big Sky Airlines, operating as Delta Connection, to provide subsidized EAS at Plattsburgh and Saranac Lake/Lake Placid, New York, utilizing 19-seat Beech 1900-D aircraft, at an annual subsidy rate of $2,408,294.
  - Order 2008-1-12 (January 16, 2008): selecting Hyannis Air Service, Inc., d/b/a Cape Air, to provide essential air service (EAS) at Plattsburgh and Saranac Lake/Lake Placid, New York, for the two-year period beginning when the carrier starts full EAS at both communities.
  - Order 2010-3-27 (March 22, 2010): selecting Colgan Air, Inc., operating as US Airways Express, to provide subsidized essential air service (EAS) at Plattsburgh, New York, utilizing 34-seat Saab 340 aircraft, for a two-year term beginning when the carrier inaugurates full service, at an annual subsidy rate of $2,117,101.
  - Order 2012-3-2 (March 2, 2012): selecting PenAir to provide EAS at Presque Isle and Plattsburgh using 34-passenger Saab 340 aircraft. At Plattsburgh, PenAir will provide 12 weekly round trips for an annual subsidy of $2,685,207 for the first 6 months after full EAS commences and $2,470,834 annually for the 18 months thereafter.
