= Swastika, New York =

Unincorporated community in New York, US

Coordinates: 44°30′47″N 73°45′39″W

Swastika is an unincorporated community and hamlet in the town of Black Brook, Clinton County, New York, United States. The community is 19 miles southwest of Plattsburgh. The area is not very populated and appears as a wide spot on the road with a few buildings.

== History ==
The name dates back to at least 1913, when a post office called Swastika, NY operated from 1913 until 1958. Edward Duprey, the town's last postmaster, told the Plattsburgh Press-Republican that the community was previously known as Goodrich Mills. "The government sent a list of names," he explained of Swastika's origin. "It had nothing to do with the community. It was just a name for the post office", he added.

In September 2020, the town's councilors unanimously voted to keep the name Swastika after a New York City resident asked the town's council to consider another name. Black Brook, New York Supervisor Jon Douglass stated the town "was named by the town’s original settlers in the 1800s and is based on the Sanskrit word meaning well-being”. He noted "the four-sided geometric character that represents the Swastika has been used for thousands of years in Indian religions and seen as a symbol of good luck", despite the word's modern associations. The request to change the name had been previously brought up during meetings, including once right after WWII.

== See also ==
- Place names considered unusual
