= Morrisonville, New York =

- Census-designated place
- Location in Clinton County and the state of New York.
- Coordinates: 44°41′27″N 73°33′3″W
- Country: United States
- State: New York
- County: Clinton
- Towns: Plattsburgh, Schuyler Falls

Area
  - Total: 3.49 sq mi (9.05 km^{2})
  - Land: 3.36 sq mi (8.71 km^{2})
  - Water: 0.13 sq mi (0.34 km^{2})
- Elevation: 360 ft (110 m)

Population (2020)
  - Total: 1,893
  - Density: 563.1/sq mi (217.42/km^{2})
- Time zone: UTC-5 (Eastern (EST))
  - Summer (DST): UTC-4 (EDT)
- ZIP Codes: 12962 (Morrisonville); 12901 (Plattsburgh)
- Area code: 518
- FIPS code: 36-48538
- GNIS feature ID: 0957705

Morrisonville is a hamlet and census-designated place in Clinton County, New York, United States. As of the 2020 census, Morrisonville had a population of 1,893.

Morrisonville is divided between the towns of Plattsburgh and Schuyler Falls by the Saranac River, which defines the boundary between the two towns. The community is west of the city of Plattsburgh .

== Geography ==
Morrisonville is located 5 miles (8 km) west of downtown Plattsburgh at 44°41′27″N 73°33′3″W (44.690778, -73.550775). New York State Route 22B passes through the village, beginning at New York State Route 3 near the eastern end of the CDP and leading south to the hamlets of Schuyler Falls and Peru.

According to the United States Census Bureau, the Morrisonville CDP has a total area of 2.7 square miles (7.0 km^{2}), of which 2.6 square miles (6.8 km^{2}) is land and 0.08 square miles (0.2 km^{2}), or 3.35%, is water.

== Demographics ==
Historical population
Census	Pop.	Note	%±
2000	1,651		—
2010	1,545		−6.4%
2020	1,893		22.5%
U.S. Decennial Census

In the census of 2000, there were 1,702 people, 648 households, and 463 families residing in the CDP. The population density was 658.3 inhabitants per square mile (254.2/km^{2}). There were 682 housing units at an average density of 263.8 per square mile (101.9/km^{2}). The racial makeup of the CDP was 97.47% White, 0.76% African American, 0.18% Native American, 0.47% Asian, 0.18% from other races, and 0.94% from two or more races. Hispanic or Latino of any race were 1.12% of the population.

There were 648 households, out of which 35.3% had children under the age of 18 living with them, 56.3% were married couples living together, 10.5% had a female householder with no husband present, and 28.4% were non-families. 21.5% of all households were made up of individuals, and 10.0% had someone living alone who was 65 years of age or older. The average household size was 2.60 and the average family size was 3.01.

In the CDP, the population was spread out, with 26.4% under the age of 18, 7.8% from 18 to 24, 28.8% from 25 to 44, 23.9% from 45 to 64, and 13.0% who were 65 years of age or older. The median age was 38 years. For every 100 females, there were 99.3 males. For every 100 females age 18 and over, there were 90.1 males.

The median income for a household in the CDP was $48,409, and the median income for a family was $53,550. Males had a median income of $34,167 versus $25,368 for females. The per capita income for the CDP was $18,225. About 12.8% of families and 15.2% of the population were below the poverty line, including 22.3% of those under age 18 and 9.9% of those age 65 or over.

== Education ==
Most of the census-designated place is within the Saranac Central School District. Portions are in the Peru Central School District and in the Beekmantown Central School District.
