= Macomb Reservation State Park =

State park in Clinton County, New York

- Location within New York Location within the United States
- Type: State park
- Location: 201 Campsite Road; Schuyler Falls, New York
- Coordinates: 44°37′12″N 73°36′43″W
- Area: 600 acres (2.4 km^{2})
- Created: 1968
- Operator: New York State Office of Parks, Recreation and Historic Preservation
- Visitors: 29,862 (in 2014)
- Open: All year
- Website: Macomb Reservation State Park

Macomb Reservation State Park is a 600-acre (2.4 km^{2}) state park in the Town of Schuyler Falls in Clinton County, New York, United States. The park is located on the Salmon River, outside the Adirondack Park, and two miles (3.2 km) west of the hamlet of Schuyler Falls.

== History ==
Macomb Reservation State Park occupies land previously used as a military training facility. New York State purchased 6,372 acres (25.79 km^{2}) of federal property in April 1947, 600 acres (2.4 km^{2}) of which were given over to the New York State Office of Parks, Recreation and Historic Preservation in 1968. The remainder of the purchased property is managed by the New York State Department of Environmental Conservation for the purpose of reforestation.

== Park description ==
The park offers a beach, a playground and playing fields, picnic tables and pavilions, recreation programs, a nature trail, fishing (in Davis Pond or the Salmon River), a boat launch for non-motorized boats, a campground for tents and trailers, a dump station, cross-country skiing, snowshoeing, snowmobiling, and ice-skating.

== See also ==
- List of New York state parks
