= Peru (CDP), New York =

Peru, New York
- Census-designated place
- Location in Clinton County and the state of New York.
- Coordinates: 44°34′46″N 73°31′50″W
- Country: United States
- State: New York
- County: Clinton
- Town: Peru

Area
  - Total: 1.92 sq mi (4.98 km^{2})
  - Land: 1.92 sq mi (4.98 km^{2})
  - Water: 0 sq mi (0.00 km^{2})
- Elevation: 335 ft (102 m)

Population (2020)
  - Total: 1,843
  - Density: 958.1/sq mi (369.94/km^{2})
- Time zone: UTC-5 (Eastern (EST))
  - Summer (DST): UTC-4 (EDT)
- ZIP code: 12972
- Area code: 518
- FIPS code: 36-57364
- GNIS feature ID: 0960223

Peru is a hamlet and census-designated place (CDP) within the town of Peru in Clinton County in the U.S. state of New York. The population of the CDP was 1,591 at the 2010 census, out of a population of 6,998 in the town as a whole.

== Geography ==
The hamlet of Peru is located east of the geographic center of the town of Peru, at 44°34′46″N 73°31′49″W (44.579556, -73.530539). It is situated on the Little Ausable River, which flows east 6 miles (10 km) to Lake Champlain.

The community is located at the junction of routes 22 and 22B. Interstate 87, the Adirondack Northway, passes 1 mile (1.6 km) east of the hamlet, with access from exit 35. Plattsburgh, the Clinton county seat, is 11 miles (18 km) north, while Keeseville is 6 miles (10 km) to the south.

According to the United States Census Bureau, the Peru CDP has a total area of 1.6 square miles (4.1 km^{2}), all land.

== Demographics ==
Historical population
Census	Pop.	Note	%±
2000	1,488		—
2010	1,591		6.9%
2020	1,843		15.8%
U.S. Decennial Census

The CDP describes the more densely populated central area within the town. The U.S. census reports data on CDP in order to provide separate demographic reporting for urbanized areas. The population and area reported here are also included in the aggregate values reported for the town as a whole, see: Peru, New York.

As of the census of 2000, there were 1,514 people, 543 households, and 415 families residing in the CDP. The population density was 944.8 inhabitants per square mile (364.8/km^{2}). There were 558 housing units at an average density of 348.2 per square mile (134.4/km^{2}). The racial makeup of the CDP was 97.82% White, 0.73% Black or African American, 0.07% Native American, 0.79% Asian, and 0.59% from two or more races. Hispanic or Latino of any race were 0.53% of the population.

There were 543 households, out of which 37.9% had children under the age of 18 living with them, 61.1% were married couples living together, 11.6% had a female householder with no husband present, and 23.4% were non-families. 19.5% of all households were made up of individuals, and 9.6% had someone living alone who was 65 years of age or older. The average household size was 2.69 and the average family size was 3.07.

In the CDP, the population was spread out, with 26.7% under the age of 18, 7.5% from 18 to 24, 26.5% from 25 to 44, 23.2% from 45 to 64, and 16.1% who were 65 years of age or older. The median age was 38 years. For every 100 females, there were 86.5 males. For every 100 females age 18 and over, there were 83.8 males.

The median income for a household in the CDP was $36,442, and the median income for a family was $43,125. Males had a median income of $31,528 versus $25,859 for females. The per capita income for the CDP was $17,142. About 9.1% of families and 14.6% of the population were below the poverty line, including 23.0% of those under age 18 and 6.4% of those age 65 or over.

== Culture ==
In autumn, the village celebrates the annual apple fest. The two-day festival includes a parade, carnival-style games, a bake sale, and live music.

== Education ==
The school district is Peru Central School District.
