= Area codes 518 and 838 =

Telephone area codes for Upstate New York, U.S.

Coordinates: 43.2°N 73.9°W

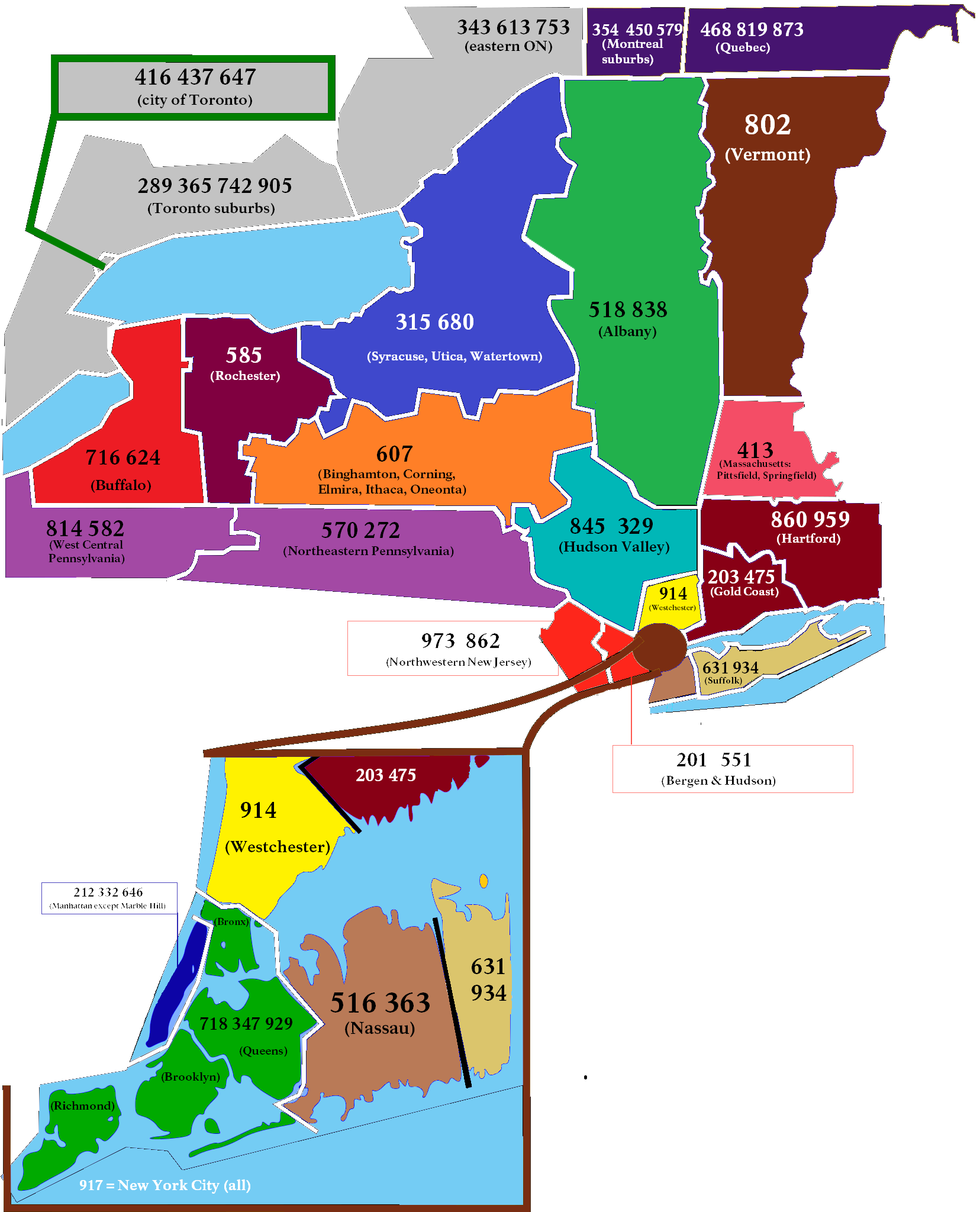
Area codes in New York state; area codes 518 and 838 highlighted in light green

Area codes 518 and 838 are telephone area codes in the North American Numbering Plan for eastern Upstate New York in the United States. 518 is one of the 86 original North American area codes created in 1947. Area code 838 was added to the 518 numbering plan area in 2017. The two area codes serve 24 counties and 1,200 ZIP Code areas in a numbering plan area (NPA) that extends from the eastern Mohawk Valley to the Vermont border, and from the Canada–US border to south of Albany. The bulk of the population is in the Capital District, the vicinity of the cities Albany, Schenectady, and Troy. Other cities in the NPA are Glens Falls, Plattsburgh, and Saratoga Springs. It includes the Upper Hudson Valley counties, Greene and Columbia counties, and some northern parts of Dutchess County.

== History ==
The 518 numbering plan area is the only one of New York's original five NPAs that still has its original boundaries. Despite the presence of the Capital District, this part of New York is not as densely populated as the rest of the state. As a result, even with the proliferation of cell phones and pagers (particularly in the Capital District and Glens Falls), it was one of the few remaining original area codes not counting those serving an entire state, that had not been split or overlaid. By the spring of 2016, however, 518 was on the verge of depletion of available central office codes to create more telephone numbers and it was projected that the region would need another area code by 2019. By the autumn, however, it was anticipated that 518 would be depleted during the third quarter of 2017. An additional area code, 838, was approved to be implemented during the autumn of 2017.

From March 18 to August 19, 2017, telephone calls could be made using seven digits or ten digits (area code + seven digit number). Ten-digit dialing became mandatory on August 20, 2017, with recorded messages reminding callers if they dialed incorrectly. On September 19, 2017, area code 838 was activated, making this the second overlay in the upstate region. At the time, 518 had been one of the few urban area codes without an overlay, making the Capital District one of the few metro areas where seven-digit dialing had not been broken.

== Service area ==
=== By county ===
- Albany
- Clinton
- Columbia
- Dutchess
- Essex
- Franklin
- Fulton
- Greene
- Hamilton
- Montgomery
- Rensselaer
- Saint Lawrence
- Saratoga
- Schenectady
- Schoharie
- Warren
- Washington
- Ulster

=== By community ===
- Albany
- Alcove
- Alplaus
- Altamont
- Altona
- Amsterdam
- Ancram
- Argyle
- Ashland
- Athens
- Athol
- Ausable Forks
- Auriesville
- Austerlitz
- Averill Park
- Bakers Mills
- Ballston
- Ballston Lake
- Ballston Spa
- Berlin
- Berne
- Bethlehem
- Bloomingdale
- Blue Mountain Lake
- Bolton Landing
- Bombay
- Brant Lake
- Broadalbin
- Brunswick
- Brushton
- Burke
- Burnt Hills
- Buskirk
- Cadyville
- Cairo
- Cambridge
- Canaan
- Canajoharie
- Carlisle
- Catskill
- Central Bridge
- Champlain
- Charlton
- Chateaugay
- Chatham
- Chazy
- Cherry Plain
- Chester
- Chestertown
- Churubusco
- Clarksville
- Claverack
- Clermont
- Clifton Park
- Climax
- Cobleskill
- Coeymans
- Cohoes
- Colonie
- Comstock
- Constable
- Copake
- Corinth
- Cornwallville
- Coxsackie
- Craryville
- Cropseyville
- Crown Point
- Dannemora
- Delanson
- Delmar
- Duanesburg
- Durham
- Eagle Bridge
- East Berne
- East Chatham
- East Durham
- East Greenbush
- East Nassau
- East Schodack
- Elizabethtown
- Ellenburg
- Esperance
- Essex
- Feura Bush
- Fort Ann
- Fort Covington
- Fort Edward
- Fort Hunter
- Fort Johnson
- Fort Plain
- Freehold
- Fultonville
- Gabriels
- Gallatin
- Gallupville
- Galway
- Gansevoort
- Germantown
- Ghent
- Glenmont
- Glens Falls
- Glenville
- Gloversville
- Grafton
- Granville
- Greenville
- Greenwich
- Guilderland
- Guilderland Center
- Hadley
- Hagaman
- Hague
- Haines Falls
- Halfmoon
- Hampton
- Hartford
- Hensonville
- Hillsdale
- Hogansburg
- Hoosick
- Hoosick Falls
- Hudson
- Hudson Falls
- Huletts Landing
- Hunter
- Indian Lake
- Jay
- Jewett
- Johnsburg
- Johnsonville
- Johnstown
- Kattskill Bay
- Keene
- Keene Valley
- Kinderhook
- Knox
- Lake Clear
- Lake George
- Lake Luzerne
- Lake Placid
- Lake Pleasant
- Latham
- Leeds
- Lewis
- Lexington
- Livingston
- Long Lake
- Loudonville
- Lyon Mountain
- Malden Bridge
- Malone
- Malta
- Mayfield
- Mechanicville
- Medusa
- Menands
- Melrose
- Middle Grove
- Middleburgh
- Millerton
- Minerva
- Mineville
- Moira
- Mooers
- Mooers Forks
- Moriah
- Morrisonville
- Nassau
- Nelliston
- New Baltimore
- New Lebanon
- New Russia
- Newcomb
- Newtonville
- Niskayuna
- Niverville
- North Creek
- North Greenbush
- North Hudson
- North River
- Northville
- Oak Hill
- Old Chatham
- Palatine Bridge
- Palenville
- Paradox
- Pattersonville
- Paul Smiths
- Perth
- Peru
- Petersburg
- Philmont
- Piercefield
- Pine Plains
- Piseco
- Plattsburgh
- Poestenkill
- Port Henry
- Port Kent
- Porter Corners
- Pottersville
- Prattsville
- Putnam Station
- Quaker Street
- Queensbury
- Ravena
- Ray Brook
- Redford
- Rensselaer
- Rensselaerville
- Rexford
- Richmondville
- Riparius
- Rock City Falls
- Rotterdam
- Rotterdam Junction
- Round Lake
- Rockland
- Rouses Point
- St. Johnsville
- Salem
- Sand Lake
- Saranac
- Saranac Lake
- Saratoga
- Saratoga Springs
- Salem
- Schaghticoke
- Schenectady
- Schodack
- Schoharie
- Schroon Lake
- Schuyler Falls
- Schuylerville
- Scotia
- Selkirk
- Severance
- Sharon Springs
- Shushan
- Silver Bay
- Slingerlands
- South Bethlehem
- South Glens Falls
- Speculator
- Spencertown
- Sprakers
- Stephentown
- Stillwater
- Stony Creek
- Stony Point
- Stuyvesant
- Stuyvesant Falls
- Surprise
- Taghkanic
- Tannersville
- Thurman
- Ticonderoga
- Tribes Hill
- Troy
- Tupper Lake
- Upper Jay
- Vail Mills
- Valatie
- Valley Falls
- Vermontville
- Voorheesville
- Warnerville
- Warrensburg
- Waterford
- Watervliet
- Waverly
- Warrensburg
- Wells
- West Chazy
- West Kill
- West Sand Lake
- Westerlo
- Westport
- Wevertown
- Whitehall
- Willsboro
- Wilmington
- Wilton
- Windham
- Witherbee
- Wynantskill

== See also ==
- List of New York area codes
- List of North American Numbering Plan area codes

New York area codes: 212/332/646, 315/680, 363/516, 518/838, 585, 607, 631/934, 624/716, 347/718/929, 329/845, 914, 917
	North: 450/579, 613/343, 819/873	
West: 315/680, 607	518/838	East: 413, 802, 860/959
	South: 845/329	
Connecticut area codes: 203/475, 860/959
Massachusetts area codes: 413, 508/774, 617/857, 781/339, 978/351
Ontario area codes: 416/437/647/942, 519/226/548/382, 613/343/753, 705/249/683, 807, 905/289/365/742
Quebec area codes: 367/418/581, 354/450/579, 263/438/514, 468/819/873
Vermont area codes: 802
