= Parc, New York =

- Census-designated place
- Location in Clinton County and the state of New York.
- Coordinates: 44°40′7″N 73°27′17″W
- Country: United States
- State: New York
- County: Clinton
- Town: Plattsburgh

Area
  - Total: 1.23 sq mi (3.19 km^{2})
  - Land: 1.23 sq mi (3.19 km^{2})
  - Water: 0 sq mi (0.00 km^{2})
- Elevation: 180 ft (55 m)

Population (2020)
  - Total: 197
  - Density: 160.0/sq mi (61.77/km^{2})
- Time zone: UTC-5 (Eastern (EST))
  - Summer (DST): UTC-4 (EDT)
- ZIP Codes: 12901, 12903 (Plattsburgh)
- FIPS code: 36-56291
- GNIS feature ID: 1852909

Parc is a location and census-designated place (CDP) in Clinton County, New York, United States. The name "Parc" is derived from the official name for the 3,447-acre (13.95 km^{2}) industrial site, which is PARC, an acronym for the Plattsburgh Airbase Redevelopment Corporation. PARC was established for the purpose of redeveloping the Plattsburgh Air Force Base after it closed on September 25, 1995. PARC is now operated by the Plattsburgh Air Base Development Authority, and the massive airfield is now Plattsburgh International Airport. As of the 2020 census, Parc had a population of 197. Parc is located in the town of Plattsburgh and is bordered to the north by the city of Plattsburgh .

== Geography ==
Parc is located in eastern Clinton County at 44°40′07″N 73°27′17″W (44.668549, -73.454735). It lies just west of Lake Champlain but does not border the lake.

According to the United States Census Bureau, the CDP has a total area of 1.2 square miles (3.2 km^{2}), all land.

== Demographics ==
Historical population
Census	Pop.	Note	%±
2020	197		—
U.S. Decennial Census

As of the census of 2000, there were 54 people, 28 households, and 15 families residing in the CDP. The population density was 38.7 inhabitants per square mile (14.9/km^{2}). There were 29 housing units at an average density of 20.8 per square mile (8.0/km^{2}). The racial makeup of the CDP was 92.59% White, 1.85% African American, 1.85% Asian, 1.85% from other races, and 1.85% from two or more races.

There were 28 households, out of which 21.4% had children under the age of 18 living with them, 42.9% were married couples living together, 10.7% had a female householder with no husband present, and 46.4% were non-families. 35.7% of all households were made up of individuals, and none had someone living alone who was 65 years of age or older. The average household size was 1.93 and the average family size was 2.47.

In the CDP, the population was spread out, with 11.1% under the age of 18, 11.1% from 18 to 24, 42.6% from 25 to 44, 27.8% from 45 to 64, and 7.4% who were 65 years of age or older. The median age was 36 years. For every 100 females, there were 74.2 males. For every 100 females age 18 and over, there were 77.8 males.

The median income for a household in the CDP was $35,417, and the median income for a family was $36,667. Males had a median income of $17,500 versus $31,250 for females. The per capita income for the CDP was $15,118. There were 30.0% of families and 34.7% of the population living below the poverty line, including 100.0% of under eighteens and none of those over 64.

== Education ==
The school district is Peru Central School District.
