= Black Brook, New York =

- Town

- Location within the state of New York Black; Brook (the United States)
- Coordinates: 44°30′6″N 73°47′11″W
- Country: United States
- State: New York
- County: Clinton

Government
  - Type: Town Council
  - Town Supervisor: Jon Douglass (D)
  - Town Council: Members' List: • Ronald Wilkins (D); • Thomas Thwaits(D); • Howard L. Aubin (D); • James Seguin (D)

Area
  - Total: 134.33 sq mi (347.92 km^{2})
  - Land: 129.98 sq mi (336.64 km^{2})
  - Water: 4.36 sq mi (11.28 km^{2})
- Elevation: 1,263 ft (385 m)

Population (2010)
  - Total: 1,497
  - Estimate (2016): 1,471
  - Density: 11.3/sq mi (4.37/km^{2})
- Time zone: UTC-5 (Eastern (EST))
  - Summer (DST): UTC-4 (EDT)
- ZIP Codes: 12912 (Au Sable Forks); 12981 (Saranac); 12985 (Schuyler Falls)
- FIPS code: 36-019-06761
- GNIS feature ID: 0978736
- Website: https://www.blackbrookny.gov/

Black Brook is a town in Clinton County, New York, United States. The population was 1,497 at the 2010 census. It is named after a stream that flows through the town.

Black Brook occupies the southwestern corner of Clinton County and is southwest of Plattsburgh. Black Brook is inside the Adirondack Park.

== History ==
The area was first settled circa 1825. The town was formed from part of the town of Peru in 1839. Early industries included farming, mining, and smelting iron.

== Geography ==
According to the United States Census Bureau, the town has a total area of 134.3 square miles (347.9 km^{2}), of which 130.0 square miles (336.6 km^{2}) is land and 4.4 square miles (11.3 km^{2}), or 3.25%, is water. The Au Sable River forms part of the southern town boundary, and the Saranac River runs through the northern part of the town. Black Brook, a tributary of the West Fork of the Au Sable River, flows southward through the center of the town. Large lakes in town include Silver Lake, Taylor Pond, and Fern Lake. The outlet of Union Falls Pond, a reservoir on the Saranac River, is in the western section of the town.

The western town line is the border of Franklin County, and the southern town boundary is the border of Essex County.

New York State Route 9N passes across the southeastern part of the town, leading east to Keeseville and southwest to Jay. New York State Route 3 crosses the northwestern corner of the town, leading northeast to Plattsburgh and southwest to Saranac Lake.

== Demographics ==
Historical population
Census	Pop.	Note	%±
1840	1,064		—
1850	2,525		137.3%
1860	3,452		36.7%
1870	3,561		3.2%
1880	3,365		−5.5%
1890	2,256		−33.0%
1900	1,933		−14.3%
1910	1,959		1.3%
1920	1,822		−7.0%
1930	1,692		−7.1%
1940	1,806		6.7%
1950	1,611		−10.8%
1960	1,595		−1.0%
1970	1,484		−7.0%
1980	1,505		1.4%
1990	1,556		3.4%
2000	1,660		6.7%
2010	1,497		−9.8%
2020	1,453		−2.9%
U.S. Decennial Census

As of the census of 2000, there were 1,660 people, 651 households, and 455 families residing in the town. The population density was 12.7 inhabitants per square mile (4.9/km^{2}). There were 957 housing units at an average density of 7.4 per square mile (2.9/km^{2}). The racial makeup of the town was 98.31% White, 0.12% African American, 0.30% Native American, 0.12% Asian, 0.24% from other races, and 0.90% from two or more races. Hispanic or Latino of any race were 0.66% of the population.

There were 651 households, out of which 33.5% had children under the age of 18 living with them, 55.9% were married couples living together, 10.3% had a female householder with no husband present, and 30.0% were non-families. 24.9% of all households were made up of individuals, and 13.1% had someone living alone who was 65 years of age or older. The average household size was 2.55, and the average family size was 3.04.

In the town, the population was spread out, with 25.6% under the age of 18, 7.3% from 18 to 24, 30.0% from 25 to 44, 23.0% from 45 to 64, and 14.1% who were 65 years of age or older. The median age was 38 years. For every 100 females, there were 102.7 males. For every 100 females age 18 and over, there were 101.1 males.

The median income for a household in the town was $32,634, and the median income for a family was $38,580. Males had a median income of $32,059 versus $20,652 for females. The per capita income for the town was $18,049. About 9.8% of families and 14.0% of the population were below the poverty line, including 17.2% of those under age 18 and 13.1% of those age 65 or over.

== Communities and locations in Black Brook ==
- Au Sable Forks – A hamlet on the southern town line at the Au Sable River and NY-9N. It extends into the town of Jay on the south side of the river.
- Black Brook – The hamlet of Black Brook is in the southern part of the town, northwest of Au Sable Forks.
- Clayburg – A hamlet on the northern town line.
- Devins Corners – A hamlet in the northeastern part of the town.
- East Kilns – A hamlet northwest of Black Brook village on Silver Lake Road.
- Fern Lake – A lake north of Black Brook village.
- Hawkeye – A hamlet at the eastern end of Silver Lake.
- Middle Kilns – A location between East Kilns and West Kilns on Forestdale Road.
- Peasleville - A location north of Fern Lake that is also part of the town of Peru
- Riverview – A hamlet on Route 3 in the northwestern corner of the town.
- Silver Lake – A lake in the western part of the town, approximately one mile wide and three miles long. Silver Lake is spring-fed and has chiefly summer residences. A large portion of the lake is state-owned and deemed "Forever Wild," free from future sale or development.
- Swastika – A hamlet north of Black Brook village.
- Taylor Pond – A lake in the southwestern part of the town, south of Silver Lake.
- Thomasville – A hamlet on the town line in the southeastern part of the town.
- Union Falls – A hamlet on the western town line.
- Union Falls Pond – A lake partly inside the western town line.
- West Kilns – A hamlet in the southwestern corner of Black Brook.
