= Plattsburgh (town), New York =

Plattsburgh, New York
- Town
- Town of Plattsburgh
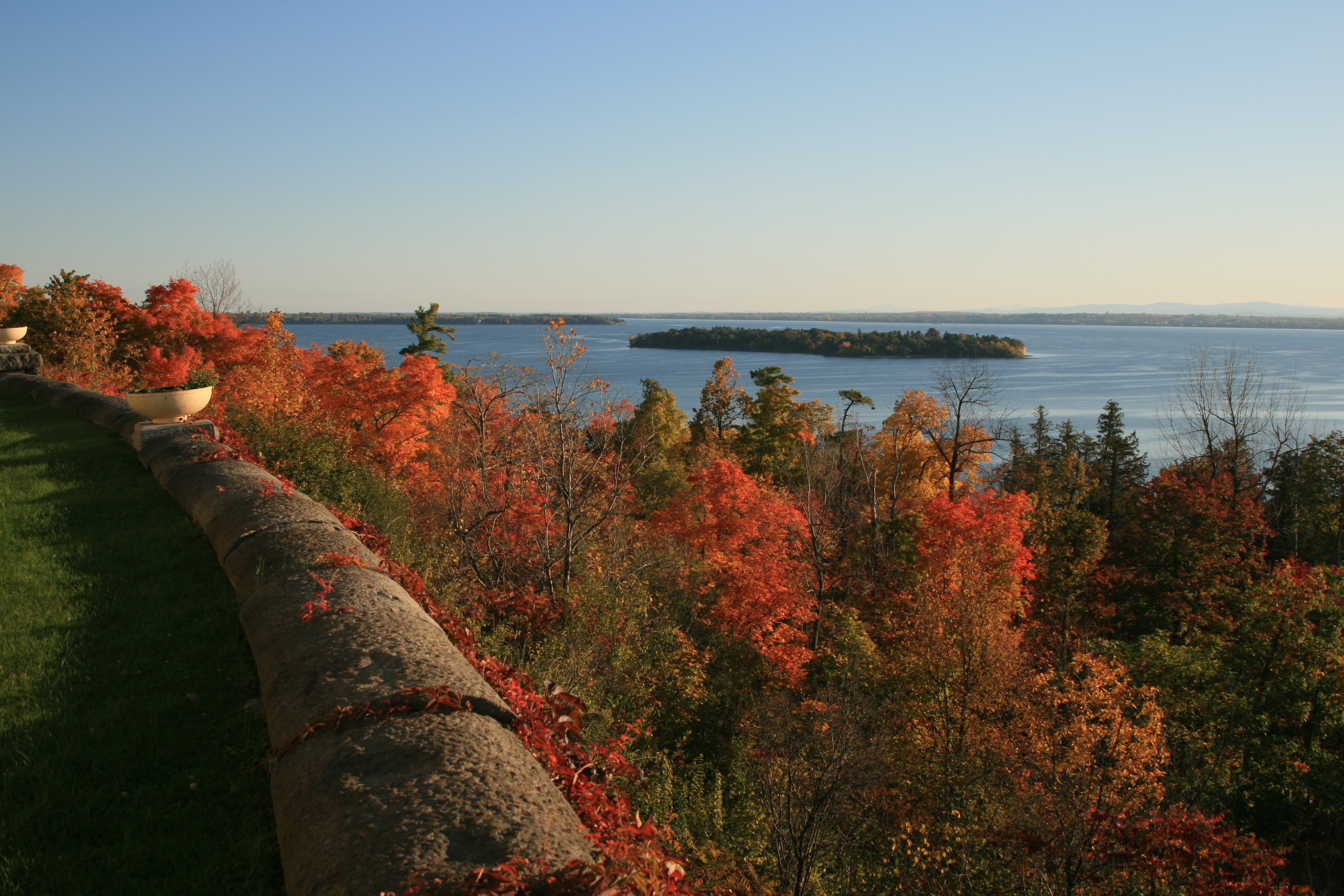
- View of Lake Champlain from the town of Plattsburgh

- Location in Clinton County and the U.S. state of New York

- Location within New York Location within the United States
- Coordinates: 44°41′17″N 73°29′44″W
- Country: United States
- State: New York
- County: Clinton

Government
  - Type: Town Council
  - Town Supervisor: Michael S. Cashman (D)
  - Town Council: Members' List: • Tom Wood; • Chuck Kostyk; • Dana Isabella; • Dan Bosley

Area
  - Total: 68.2 sq mi (176.7 km^{2})
  - Land: 45.9 sq mi (118.9 km^{2})
  - Water: 22.3 sq mi (57.7 km^{2})
- Elevation: 276 ft (84 m)

Population (2020)
  - Total: 11,886
  - Density: 258/sq mi (99.8/km^{2})
- Time zone: UTC-5 (Eastern (EST))
  - Summer (DST): UTC-4 (EDT)
- ZIP codes: 12901, 12903 (Plattsburgh); 12918 (Cadyville); 12962 (Morrisonville); 12992 (West Chazy)
- Area code: 518
- FIPS code: 36-58585
- GNIS feature ID: 0979377
- Website: www.townofplattsburghny.gov

Plattsburgh is a town in Clinton County, New York, United States. The population was 11,886 at the 2020 census. The town is named after Zephaniah Platt, an early land owner, and it surrounds the separate and more populous city of the same name. The town is in the eastern part of the county, in the North Country region of the state of New York. The region's airport, Plattsburgh International Airport, is located in the southern part of the town.

== History ==
The town was established in 1785, but parts were later removed to form other county towns: Peru (1792), Beekmantown (1820), Saranac (1824), and Schuyler Falls (1848). The village of Plattsburgh was incorporated within the town in 1815, then made a city in 1902.

The Battle of Plattsburgh was fought in 1814 on Lake Champlain during the War of 1812.

== Geography ==
According to the United States Census Bureau, the town has a total area of 68.2 square miles (176.7 km^{2}), of which 45.9 square miles (118.9 km^{2}) is land and 22.3 square miles (57.7 km^{2}), or 32.68%, is water.

The town borders Lake Champlain, separating it from the U.S. state of Vermont across the lake. The Saranac River flows eastward through the town to Lake Champlain.

The Adirondack Northway (Interstate 87), U.S. Route 9, and New York State Route 22 are north-south highways through the town. New York State Route 3, New York State Route 22B, and New York State Route 374 are east-west highways. New York State Route 190 intersects NY-22B and NY-374 in Plattsburgh.

== Demographics ==
Historical population
Census	Pop.	Note	%±
1820	3,519		—
1830	4,913		39.6%
1840	6,416		30.6%
1850	5,618		−12.4%
1860	6,680		18.9%
1870	8,414		26.0%
1880	8,283		−1.6%
1890	2,490		−69.9%
1900	3,178		27.6%
1910	2,362		−25.7%
1920	2,085		−11.7%
1930	2,132		2.3%
1940	3,163		48.4%
1950	3,713		17.4%
1960	13,390		260.6%
1970	15,881		18.6%
1980	16,384		3.2%
1990	17,231		5.2%
2000	11,184		−35.1%
2010	11,870		6.1%
2020	11,886		0.1%
U.S. Decennial Census

As of the census of 2000, there were 11,190 people, 4,367 households, and 3,091 families residing in the town. The population density was 244.9 inhabitants per square mile (94.6/km^{2}). There were 4,875 housing units at an average density of 106.7 per square mile (41.2/km^{2}). The racial makeup of the town was 96.68% white, 1.07% black or African American, .38% Native American, .55% Asian, .01% Pacific Islander, .44% from other races, and .88% from two or more races. Hispanic or Latino of any race were 1.04% of the population.

There were 4,367 households, out of which 33.8% had children under the age of 18 living with them, 55.0% were married couples living together, 10.9% had a female householder with no husband present, and 29.2% were non-families. 21.9% of all households were made up of individuals, and 7.9% had someone living alone who was 65 years of age or older. The average household size was 2.53 and the average family size was 2.94.

In the town, the population was spread out, with 25.6% under the age of 18, 7.6% from 18 to 24, 29.7% from 25 to 44, 25% from 45 to 64, and 12.2% who were 65 years of age or older. The median age was 37 years. For every 100 females, there were 98.4 males. For every 100 females age 18 and over, there were 94.1 males.

The median income for a household in the town was $41,713, and the median income for a family was $50,277. Males had a median income of $36,542 versus $25,565 for females. The per capita income for the town was $19,385. About 8.8% of families and 11.9% of the population were below the poverty line, including 14.2% of those under age 18 and 14.4% of those age 65 or over.

== Communities and locations in the town ==
- Cadyville – A hamlet in the southwestern part of the town, on NY-3 and the Saranac River.
- Champlain Park – A hamlet on Cumberland Head in the northeastern part of the town.
- Cliff Haven – A neighborhood on the shore of Lake Champlain south of the city of Plattsburgh.
- Clinton County Airport (PLB) – A closed airport west of the city by NY-22B.
- Colligan Point – A location on the eastern shore of Cumberland Head.
- Crab Island – A small island and undeveloped state park in Lake Champlain, east of Cliff Haven.
- Cumberland Bay – A bay of Lake Champlain formed by Cumberland Head on its east side. The city of Plattsburgh is sited on the west shore of the bay.
- Cumberland Bay State Park – A state park in the northeastern part of the town, on Cumberland Head.
- Cumberland Head – A peninsula on the Lake Champlain shoreline, known for its unique style of Monte Cristo sandwich.
- Elsinor – A hamlet at the west town line on NY-3 and the Saranac River.
- Everest Rabideau Park – A park on Cumberland Head.
- Halseys Corners – A hamlet near the city of Plattsburgh by the Northway.
- Lawless Corners – A hamlet on the northern town line, north of West Plattsburgh.
- Martin Point – A location on the eastern shore of Cumberland Head.
- Morrisonville – A hamlet at the south town line on NY-22B and the Saranac River that extends into Schuyler Falls.
- Plattsburgh – The city of Plattsburgh is situated in what was once the east-central part of the town.
- Plattsburgh International Airport – The current airport of the area, located on the site of the former Plattsburgh Air Force Base, south of the city of Plattsburgh.
- Pleasant Ridge Corners – A hamlet southwest of the city and north of South Plattsburgh.
- Rocky Point – A hamlet on Cumberland Head.
- South Junction – A hamlet near Lake Champlain in the southeastern section of the town.
- South Plattsburgh – A hamlet by the town line in the southeastern part of the town on NY-22.
- Valcour Island – The northern end of the island is in the town.
- West Plattsburgh – A hamlet in the north central part of the town on NY-374.
- Woodruff Pond – A small lake north of Cumberland Head.

=== Census-designated places in the town ===
- Cumberland Head
- Morrisonville (partially in the town)
- Parc
- Plattsburgh West
