= Cadyville, New York =

- Hamlet and CDP
- Location within New York Location within the United States
- Coordinates: 44°41′53″N 73°37′54″W
- Country: United States
- State: New York
- County: Clinton
- Elevation: 745 ft (227 m)
- Time zone: UTC-5 (Eastern (EST))
  - Summer (DST): UTC-4 (EDT)
- ZIP code: 12918
- Area codes: 518 & 838
- GNIS feature ID: 945429

Cadyville is a hamlet (and census-designated place) in Clinton County, New York, United States. As of the 2020 census, Cadyville had a population of 479. The community is located along the Saranac River and New York State Route 374, 8.8 miles (14.2 km) west of Plattsburgh. Cadyville has a post office with ZIP code 12918, which opened on July 25, 1840.

== Education ==
The school district is Saranac Central School District.
