= Schuyler Falls, New York =

- Town
- Location in Clinton County and the state of New York.
- Coordinates: 44°39′47″N 73°33′54″W
- Country: United States
- State: New York
- County: Clinton

Government
  - Type: Town Council
  - Town Supervisor: Kevin Randall Jr. (R)
  - Town Council: Members' List: • Howard Newton (R); • Martin "Mike" Perrotte (R); • Vernon Bruno (R); • Reginald Facteau (R)

Area
  - Total: 37.27 sq mi (96.52 km^{2})
  - Land: 36.96 sq mi (95.73 km^{2})
  - Water: 0.30 sq mi (0.78 km^{2})
- Elevation: 561 ft (171 m)

Population (2010)
  - Total: 5,181
  - Density: 138.5/sq mi (53.48/km^{2})
- Time zone: UTC-5 (Eastern (EST))
  - Summer (DST): UTC-4 (EDT)
- ZIP Codes: 12985 (Schuyler Falls); 12962 (Morrisonville); 12901 (Plattsburgh); 12918 (Cadyville); 12972 (Peru)
- Area code: 518
- FIPS code: 36-019-65717
- GNIS feature ID: 0979474
- Website: schuylerfallsny.gov

Schuyler Falls is a town in Clinton County, New York, United States. The population was 5,181 at the 2010 census. The town was named after Peter Schuyler, who bought the mill on the Salmon River from Zephaniah Platt.

Schuyler Falls is in the south-central part of the county and is southwest of Plattsburgh.

== History ==
The area was first settled circa 1794 by Ezra Turner, who settled near the Salmon River, and built the first sawmill in 1801.

The town was formed from the town of Plattsburgh in 1848.

== Geography ==
According to the United States Census Bureau, the town of Schuyler Falls has a total area of 36.8 square miles (95.4 km^{2}), of which 36.5 square miles (94.6 km^{2}) is land and 0.31 square miles (0.8 km^{2}), or 0.82%, is water.

The Saranac River forms the northern town line, with the town of Plattsburgh on the opposite shore. The Salmon River runs through the southern part of the town, approximately 1 mile (1.6 km) north of the border with the town of Peru. Both rivers flow east into Lake Champlain.

New York State Route 22B is a north-south highway in the town, beginning east-west in the hamlet of Morrisonville.

== Demographics ==
Historical population
Census	Pop.	Note	%±
1850	2,110		—
1860	1,976		−6.4%
1870	1,684		−14.8%
1880	1,640		−2.6%
1890	1,456		−11.2%
1900	1,665		14.4%
1910	1,588		−4.6%
1920	1,400		−11.8%
1930	1,350		−3.6%
1940	1,480		9.6%
1950	1,585		7.1%
1960	3,157		99.2%
1970	2,884		−8.6%
1980	4,184		45.1%
1990	4,787		14.4%
2000	5,130		7.2%
2010	5,181		1.0%
2016 (est.)	5,120		−1.2%
U.S. Decennial Census

As of the census of 2000, there were 5,128 people, 1,866 households, and 1,416 families residing in the town. The population density was 140.5 inhabitants per square mile (54.2/km^{2}). There were 2,001 housing units at an average density of 54.8 per square mile (21.2/km^{2}). The racial makeup of the town was 97.15% White, 1.09% African American, 0.31% Native American, 0.37% Asian, 0.23% from other races, and 0.84% from two or more races. Hispanic or Latino of any race were 0.84% of the population.

There were 1,866 households, out of which 38.6% had children under the age of 18 living with them, 60.5% were married couples living together, 10.0% had a female householder with no husband present, and 24.1% were non-families. 16.8% of all households were made up of individuals, and 5.5% had someone living alone who was 65 years of age or older. The average household size was 2.71 and the average family size was 3.03.

In the town, the population was spread out, with 28.2% under the age of 18, 7.5% from 18 to 24, 30.9% from 25 to 44, 24.6% from 45 to 64, and 8.8% who were 65 years of age or older. The median age was 36 years. For every 100 females, there were 101.7 males. For every 100 females age 18 and over, there were 99.3 males.

The median income for a household in the town was $41,691, and the median income for a family was $45,262. Males had a median income of $33,242 versus $23,638 for females. The per capita income for the town was $18,294. About 7.4% of families and 9.6% of the population were below the poverty line, including 14.7% of those under age 18 and 1.0% of those age 65 or over.

== Communities and locations in Schuyler Falls ==
- Banker Corners – A location at the southwestern corner of the town.
- Fanlon Corners – A hamlet northwest of Schuyler Falls village.
- Macomb Reservation State Park – A state park in the southern part of the town.
- Morrisonville – A hamlet by the northern town line, partly in the Town of Plattsburgh.
- Norrisville – A former community located in the southern part of the town.
- Rock Corners – A hamlet north of Schuyler Falls village.
- Salmon River – An important stream in the southern part of the town, flowing through the hamlet of Schuyler Falls.
- Schuyler Falls – The hamlet of Schuyler Falls on NY Route 22B. The community claims to have been founded in 1641 and incorporated as a village in 1758. It is no longer an incorporated village.
- Woods Mill – A hamlet in the northwestern part of the town, west of Morrisonville, by the Saranac River.

== Notable people ==
- Calvin Bridges (1889–1938), geneticist, was born in Schuyler Falls
- Joseph S. Sterling (1878-1959), businessman, entrepreneur, owner/operator of Alaska Silver Fox & Fur Company in Schuyler Falls with branches in Au Sable Chasm and Lake Placid

== Media ==
- WOXR a classical music radio station. It is part of the Vermont Public Radio network and serves the Burlington, Vermont/Plattsburgh, New York area.
