= Saranac, New York =

- Town
- Location in Clinton County and the state of New York.
- Coordinates: 44°39′13″N 73°46′27″W
- Country: United States
- State: New York
- County: Clinton

Government
  - Type: Town Council
  - Town Supervisor: Timothy Napper (R)
  - Town Council: Members' List: Michele Petrashune (R); Tracy Eggleston (R); James "Blue" Terry (R); Connor Perry (R)

Area
  - Total: 115.50 sq mi (299.15 km^{2})
  - Land: 114.84 sq mi (297.44 km^{2})
  - Water: 0.66 sq mi (1.71 km^{2})
- Elevation: 1,257 ft (383 m)

Population (2010)
  - Total: 4,007
  - Estimate (2016): 3,952
  - Density: 34.4/sq mi (13.29/km^{2})
- Time zone: UTC-5 (Eastern (EST))
  - Summer (DST): UTC-4 (EDT)
- ZIP Codes: 12981 (Saranac); 12929 (Dannemora); 12978 (Redford); 12918 (Cadyville); 12952 (Lyon Mountain)
- Area code: 518
- FIPS code: 36-019-65211
- GNIS feature ID: 0979460
- Website: www.townofsaranac.com/index.html

Saranac is a town in Clinton County, New York, United States. The town is on the western border of the county, west of Plattsburgh, and is within the Adirondack Park. The population was 3,852 at the 2020 census, down from 4,007 at the 2010 census. The town is named for the Saranac River that flows through the town.

== History ==
The first settlement took place circa 1802. The town of Saranac was established from the western part of the town of Plattsburgh in 1824.

== Geography ==
According to the United States Census Bureau, the town has a total area of 115.9 square miles (300.3 km^{2}), of which 115.3 square miles (298.6 km^{2}) is land and 0.66 square miles (1.7 km^{2}), or 0.57%, is water.

The western town line is the border of Franklin County.

The Saranac River is the principal waterway in the town, flowing through the southern and eastern sections of the town toward Lake Champlain.

New York State Route 3 is the principal east–west highway through Saranac.

== Demographics ==
Historical population
Census	Pop.	Note	%±
1830	316		—
1840	4,426		1,300.6%
1850	2,582		−41.7%
1860	3,644		41.1%
1870	3,802		4.3%
1880	4,552		19.7%
1890	3,496		−23.2%
1900	3,463		−0.9%
1910	3,000		−13.4%
1920	2,684		−10.5%
1930	2,367		−11.8%
1940	2,820		19.1%
1950	2,399		−14.9%
1960	4,006		67.0%
1970	3,127		−21.9%
1980	3,389		8.4%
1990	3,710		9.5%
2000	4,165		12.3%
2010	4,007		−3.8%
2016 (est.)	3,952		−1.4%
U.S. Decennial Census

As of the census of 2000, there were 4,165 people, 1,519 households, and 1,134 families residing in the town. The population density was 36.0 inhabitants per square mile (13.9/km^{2}). There were 1,642 housing units at an average density of 14.2 per square mile (5.5/km^{2}). The racial makeup of the town was 98.63% White, 0.14% African American, 0.34% Native American, 0.19% Asian, 0.05% Pacific Islander, 0.24% from other races, and 0.41% from two or more races. Hispanic or Latino of any race were 1.03% of the population.

There were 1,519 households, out of which 39.2% had children under the age of 18 living with them, 61.1% were married couples living together, 9.4% had a female householder with no husband present, and 25.3% were non-families. 19.4% of all households were made up of individuals, and 8.0% had someone living alone who was 65 years of age or older. The average household size was 2.74 and the average family size was 3.14.

In the town, the population was spread out, with 28.6% under the age of 18, 6.7% from 18 to 24, 30.8% from 25 to 44, 22.9% from 45 to 64, and 11.0% who were 65 years of age or older. The median age was 36 years. For every 100 females, there were 96.7 males. For every 100 females age 18 and over, there were 95.8 males.

The median income for a household in the town was $45,761, and the median income for a family was $51,542. Males had a median income of $40,315 versus $28,750 for females. The per capita income for the town was $18,242. About 6.4% of families and 9.8% of the population were below the poverty line, including 11.1% of those under age 18 and 16.7% of those age 65 or over.

== Communities and locations in Saranac ==
- Clayburg – A hamlet on NY-3 and the north side of the Saranac River, southwest of Saranac hamlet. The Saranac River flows into the town at Clayburg.
- Dannemora – The village of Dannemora is partly in the town, at the northern town line.
- Elsinore – A location by NY-3 and the Saranac River at the eastern town line.
- High Bank – A hamlet in the southwestern part of the town on Standish Road.
- Moffitsville – A hamlet southwest of Saranac hamlet on NY-3 by the Saranac River.
- Picketts Corners – A hamlet northeast of Saranac hamlet on NY-3.
- Redford – A hamlet in the southwestern section of the town on NY-3, southwest of Saranac hamlet and northeast of Clayburg.
- Russia – A hamlet northwest of Saranac hamlet.
- Saranac – The hamlet of Saranac, located on NY-3 on the north side of the Saranac River.
- Saranac Hollow – An historic location near the river.
- Standish – A hamlet in the northwestern corner of the town.
