= Peru, New York =

- Town
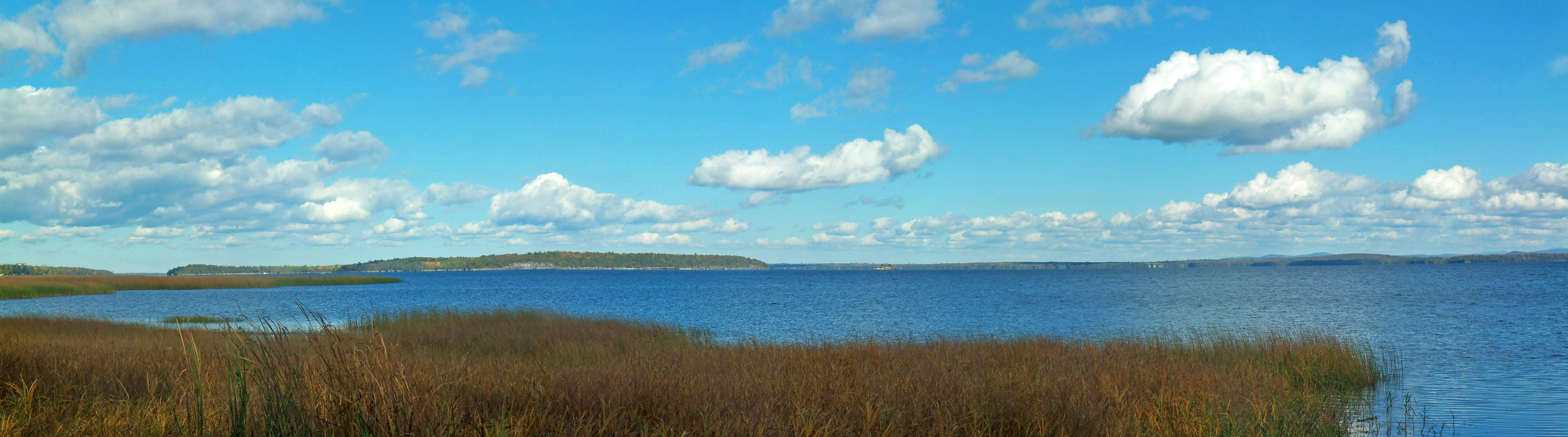
- Valcour Island and Lake Champlain from Au Sable Marsh in Peru

- Location in Clinton County and the state of New York
- Coordinates: 44°35′9″N 73°31′13″W
- Country: United States
- State: New York
- County: Clinton

Government
  - Type: Town Council
  - Town Supervisor: Peter G. Glushko (R)
  - Town Council: Members' List: • Brandy L. McDonald (D); • James T. Douglass (D); • Susan E. Polhemus (R); • Kregg M. Bruno (D)

Area
  - Total: 92.38 sq mi (239.26 km^{2})
  - Land: 78.89 sq mi (204.32 km^{2})
  - Water: 13.49 sq mi (34.94 km^{2})
- Elevation: 436 ft (133 m)

Population (2020)
  - Total: 6,772
  - Density: 88.6/sq mi (34.19/km^{2})
- Time zone: UTC-5 (Eastern (EST))
  - Summer (DST): UTC-4 (EDT)
- ZIP Codes: 12972 (Peru); 12901 (Plattsburgh); 12985 (Schuyler Falls)
- Area code: 518
- FIPS code: 36-019-57375
- GNIS feature ID: 0979358
- Website: www.perutown.com

Peru is a town in Clinton County in the U.S. state of New York. The population was 6,772 at the 2020 census. The town was so named for its views of the Adirondack Mountains to the west and the farmlands throughout the town, resembling scenery found in the country of Peru in South America. Peru, New York, is in the southeastern part of Clinton County, south of Plattsburgh.

== History ==
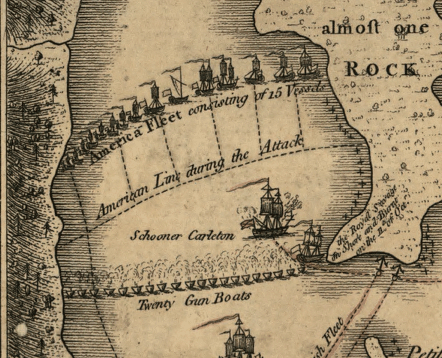
Battle of Valcour Island

The area was first settled by Connor VanNess in 1772. The Battle of Valcour Island was fought in Lake Champlain in the eastern part of Peru in 1776.

Peru was formed from parts of the towns of Plattsburgh and Willsboro (the latter now in Essex County) in 1792. Part of Peru was returned to Willsboro in 1799. In 1838, part of the town was used to form the towns of Au Sable and Black Brook.

On April 20, 2002, around 6:50 am, a magnitude 5.2 earthquake was centered in the western part of Peru, 15 miles (24 km) southwest of Plattsburgh with only marginal damages.

== Geography ==
According to the United States Census Bureau, the town of Peru has a total area of 92.4 square miles (239.3 km^{2}), of which 78.9 square miles (204.3 km^{2}) is land and 13.5 square miles (34.9 km^{2}), or 14.60%, is water.

The eastern part of the town fronts on Lake Champlain, and the eastern town line, in the center of the lake, is the state border with Vermont. The Ausable River forms part of the southern town line, and the Little Ausable River flows eastward through the southern section of Peru.

The Adirondack Northway (Interstate 87) and U.S. Route 9 are north–south highways through the town. New York State Route 22, New York State Route 22B, and New York State Route 442 (an east–west highway), also known as the Bear Swamp Road, intersect at Peru village.

== Demographics ==
Historical population
| Census | Pop. | Note | %± |
|---|---|---|---|
| 1820 | 2,710 | | — |
| 1830 | 4,949 | | 82.6% |
| 1840 | 3,134 | | −36.7% |
| 1850 | 3,640 | | 16.1% |
| 1860 | 3,389 | | −6.9% |
| 1870 | 2,632 | | −22.3% |
| 1880 | 2,610 | | −0.8% |
| 1890 | 2,356 | | −9.7% |
| 1900 | 2,372 | | 0.7% |
| 1910 | 2,236 | | −5.7% |
| 1920 | 2,000 | | −10.6% |
| 1930 | 1,989 | | −0.5% |
| 1940 | 2,287 | | 15.0% |
| 1950 | 2,348 | | 2.7% |
| 1960 | 3,110 | | 32.5% |
| 1970 | 4,312 | | 38.6% |
| 1980 | 5,352 | | 24.1% |
| 1990 | 6,254 | | 16.9% |
| 2000 | 6,370 | | 1.9% |
| 2010 | 6,998 | | 9.9% |
| 2020 | 6,772 | | −3.2% |
U.S. Decennial Census

As of the census of 2000, there were 6,370 people, 2,309 households, and 1,777 families residing in the town. The population density was 80.3 inhabitants per square mile (31.0/km^{2}). There were 2,510 housing units at an average density of 31.6 per square mile (12.2/km^{2}). The racial makeup of the town was 97.22% White, 0.91% Black or African American, 0.08% Native American, 0.61% Asian, 0.16% from other races, and 1.02% from two or more races. Hispanic or Latino of any race were 0.85% of the population.

There were 2,309 households, out of which 39.2% had children under the age of 18 living with them, 63.4% were married couples living together, 9.3% had a female householder with no husband present, and 23.0% were non-families. 18.1% of all households were made up of individuals, and 7.5% had someone living alone who was 65 years of age or older. The average household size was 2.73 and the average family size was 3.07.

In the town, the population was spread out, with 28.3% under the age of 18, 6.5% from 18 to 24, 30.4% from 25 to 44, 23.2% from 45 to 64, and 11.5% who were 65 years of age or older. The median age was 37 years. For every 100 females, there were 94.6 males. For every 100 females age 18 and over, there were 90.8 males.

The median income for a household in the town was $39,051, and the median income for a family was $47,853. Males had a median income of $32,196 versus $23,984 for females. The per capita income for the town was $19,676. About 7.6% of families and 11.1% of the population were below the poverty line, including 14.3% of those under age 18 and 9.6% of those age 65 or over.

== Communities and locations in Peru ==
- Clark Corners – A location west of Peru village.
- Coffey Corners – A location near the northern town line, north of Peru village.
- Cromie Corners – A location northwest of Peru village.
- Day Point – A location on the shore of Lake Champlain, opposite Valcour Island.
- Lapham's Mills (formerly "Bartonville") – A hamlet northeast of Peru village, near the Northway.
- Macomb Reservation State Park – A state park at the northern town line.
- Peasleeville – A location west of the town.
- Peru – The hamlet of Peru is at the junction of NY Route 22 and NY Route 22B in the east-central part of the town. It was first settled circa 1795.
- South Junction – A hamlet at the northeastern town line.
- Valcour (formerly "Port Valcour") – A hamlet on the shore of Lake Champlain and US-9.
- Valcour Island – The southern 80% of this island in Lake Champlain is part of the town.

== Notable people ==
- Asa Adgate (1767–1832), congressman from New York, held several local government positions here
- Frances Elizabeth "Fran" Allen (1932–2020), IBM computer scientist raised in Peru.
- Charles H. Anson (1841–1928), Wisconsin state legislator and businessman, was born in Peru.
- Frank A. Anson (1844–1909), Wisconsin state legislator and businessman, was born in Peru.
- James Henry Lockwood (1793–1857), lawyer, fur trapper, merchant
- Francis A. Pratt (1827–1902), Connecticut mechanical engineer, inventor, and founder of Pratt & Whitney
