= Clinton County, New York =

County in New York, United States

- County
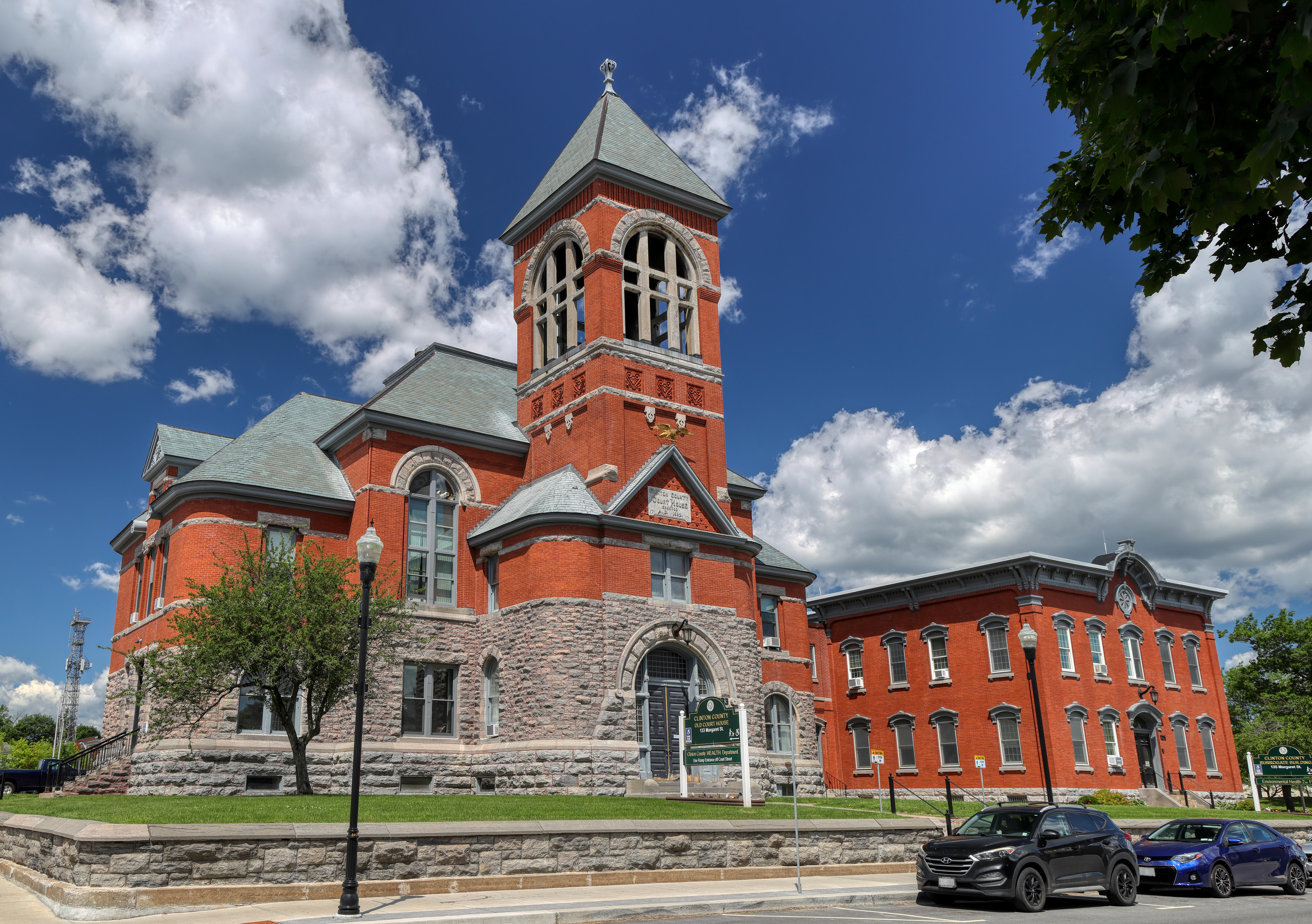
- Old Clinton County Courthouse

- Flag Seal

- Location within the U.S. state of New York
- Coordinates: 44°44′N 73°41′W
- Country: United States
- State: New York
- Founded: 1788
- Named for: George Clinton
- Seat: Plattsburgh
- Largest city: Plattsburgh

Area
  - Total: 1,117.53 sq mi (2,894.4 km^{2})
  - Land: 1,037.85 sq mi (2,688.0 km^{2})
  - Water: 80 sq mi (210 km^{2}) 7.1%

Population (2020)
  - Total: 79,843
  - Estimate (2025): 78,138 ▼
  - Density: 71/sq mi (27/km^{2})
- Time zone: UTC−5 (Eastern)
  - Summer (DST): UTC−4 (EDT)
- Congressional district: 21st
- Website: www.clintoncountyny.gov

Clinton County is the northeasternmost county in the U.S. state of New York. As of the 2020 United States Census, the population was 79,843. Its county seat is the city of Plattsburgh. The county lies just south of the border with the Canadian province of Quebec, and to the west of the State of Vermont. The county is named for George Clinton, the first Governor of New York, who later was elected as Vice President. He had been a Founding Father who represented New York in the Continental Congress. Clinton County comprises the Plattsburgh, New York micropolitan statistical area. The county is part of the North Country region of the state.

== History ==
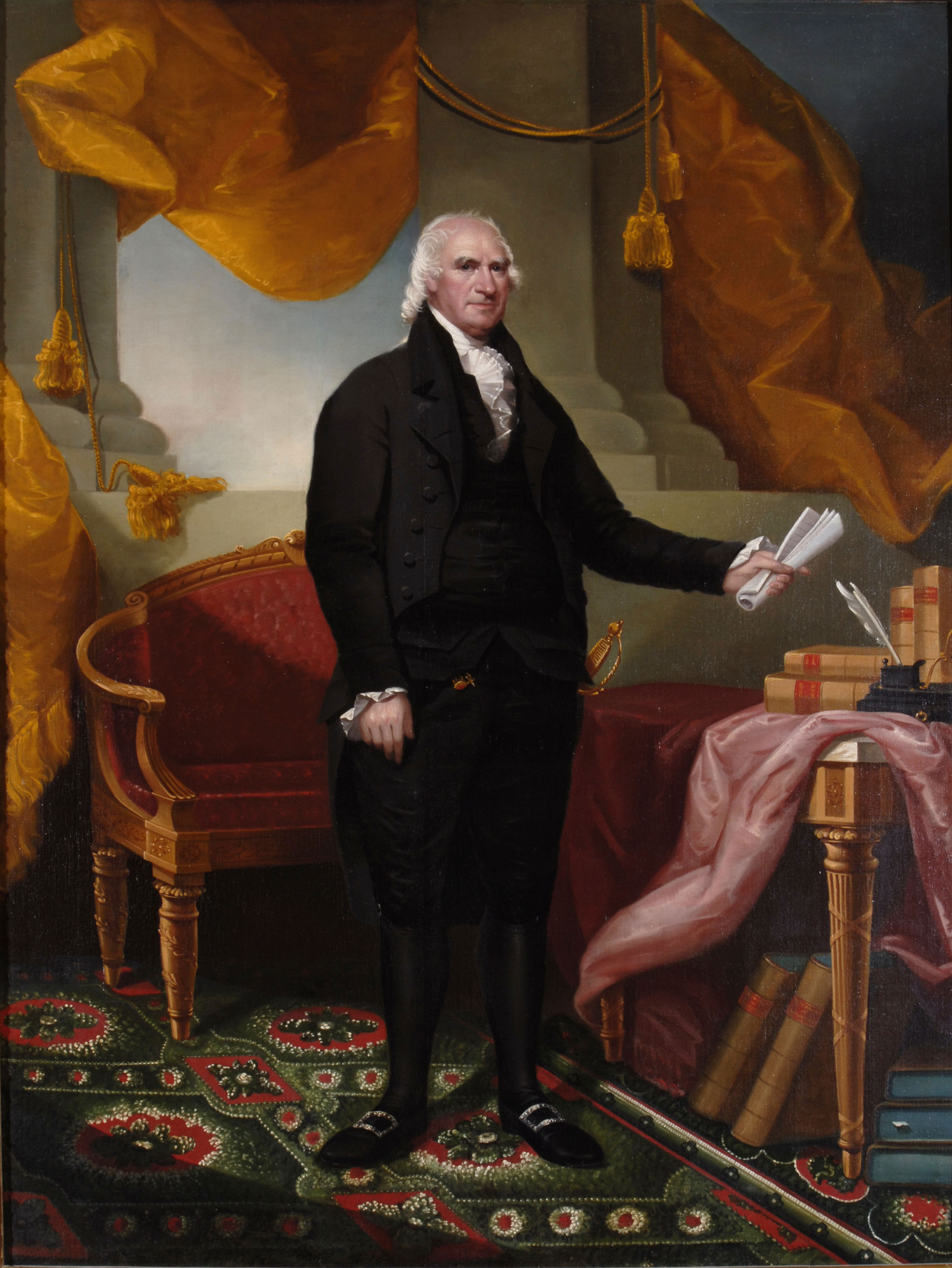
George Clinton, namesake of Clinton County. First Governor of New York, Vice President under Thomas Jefferson and James Madison, and representative of New York in the Continental Congress

When counties were established in New York State in 1683, the present Clinton County was part of Albany County. This was an enormous county, including the northern part of New York State as well as all of the present state of Vermont and, in theory, extending westward to the Pacific Ocean. This county was reduced in size on July 3, 1766, by the creation of Cumberland County, and further on March 16, 1770, by the creation of Gloucester County, both containing territory now in Vermont. On March 12, 1772, what was left of Albany County was split into three parts, one remaining under the name Albany County. One of the other pieces, Charlotte County, contained the eastern portion.

In 1784, the name "Charlotte County" was changed to Washington County to honor George Washington, the American Revolutionary War General and later the first President of the United States of America.

In 1788, Clinton County split off from Washington County.

In 1799, Essex County split off from Clinton County.

In 1802, parts of Clinton, Herkimer, and Montgomery counties formed the new St. Lawrence County.

In 1808, Franklin County split off from Clinton County.

== Geography ==
Clinton County lies at the northeast corner of New York state. Its northern border abuts the Canadian province of Quebec. Its eastern border abuts the state of Vermont (across Lake Champlain). The encompassing region is referred to as the Adirondack Coast.

The Saranac River flows easterly through the central part of the county, discharging into Lake Champlain at Plattsburgh, and the Great Chazy River flows northeastward through the upper part of the county, discharging into Lake Champlain at Coopersville. The Ausable River forms a large part of the southern county line. The county's highest point is Lyon Mountain, in the town of Dannemora, at 3,830 ft (1,170 m) ASL. According to the US Census Bureau, the county has a total area of 1,117.53 square miles (2,894.4 km^{2}), of which 1,037.85 square miles (2,688.0 km^{2}) is land and 79.67 square miles (206.3 km^{2}) (7.1%) is water.

=== Adjacent counties and municipalities ===
- Grand Isle County, Vermont — east
- Chittenden County, Vermont — southeast
- Essex County — south
- Franklin County — west
- Le Haut-Richelieu Regional County Municipality, Quebec — north
- Le Haut-Saint-Laurent Regional County Municipality, Quebec — north
- Les Jardins-de-Napierville Regional County Municipality, Quebec — north

=== Protected areas ===
- Adirondack Park (part)
- Ausable Marsh Wildlife Management Area
- Cadyville State Forest
- Chazy Fossil Reef National Natural Landmark (part)
- Dannemora State Forest
- Dunkin's Reserve State Forest
- Flat Rock State Forest
- Kings Bay Wildlife Management Area
- Macomb State Forest
- Miner Lake State Park
- Monty's Bay Wildlife Management Area
- Point au Roche State Park
- Valcour Island
  - Valcour Island Primitive Area

=== Lakes ===
- Chazy Lake
- Fern Lake
- Lake Champlain (along east border)
- Mead Reservoir
- Military Pond
- Miner Lake
- Mud Pond
- Newberry Pond
- Patterson Reservoir
- Silver Lake
- Slush Pond
- Taylor Pond
- Union Falls Pond (part)
- Upper Chateaugay Lake

== Government and politics ==
United States presidential election results for Clinton County, New York
Year	Republican		Democratic		Third party(ies)	
Year	No.	%	No.	%	No.	%
1884	5,973	53.44%	5,151	46.08%	54	0.48%
1888	6,271	56.72%	4,724	42.73%	61	0.55%
1892	5,135	50.60%	4,773	47.03%	241	2.37%
1896	6,005	65.35%	3,074	33.45%	110	1.20%
1900	6,326	58.81%	4,287	39.86%	143	1.33%
1904	6,327	59.06%	3,988	37.23%	397	3.71%
1908	5,474	55.54%	3,866	39.22%	516	5.24%
1912	3,903	44.74%	3,323	38.09%	1,497	17.16%
1916	4,986	53.68%	4,130	44.47%	172	1.85%
1920	9,062	67.70%	4,110	30.71%	213	1.59%
1924	7,918	57.80%	5,138	37.51%	642	4.69%
1928	7,824	41.68%	10,888	58.00%	59	0.31%
1932	8,263	42.67%	11,027	56.94%	75	0.39%
1936	10,521	48.85%	10,898	50.60%	119	0.55%
1940	10,369	47.56%	11,378	52.19%	53	0.24%
1944	8,775	46.66%	9,996	53.15%	35	0.19%
1948	9,694	49.07%	9,357	47.37%	704	3.56%
1952	14,535	64.50%	7,963	35.34%	37	0.16%
1956	16,295	70.46%	6,833	29.54%	0	0.00%
1960	11,154	44.70%	13,782	55.24%	15	0.06%
1964	6,078	24.82%	18,398	75.12%	16	0.07%
1968	11,951	51.58%	10,153	43.82%	1,064	4.59%
1972	17,048	63.60%	9,703	36.20%	53	0.20%
1976	15,433	56.94%	11,555	42.63%	115	0.42%
1980	13,120	48.79%	11,498	42.76%	2,272	8.45%
1984	19,549	64.22%	10,804	35.49%	90	0.30%
1988	15,702	54.97%	12,670	44.36%	191	0.67%
1992	13,455	42.06%	12,881	40.27%	5,652	17.67%
1996	9,759	33.58%	15,386	52.95%	3,915	13.47%
2000	13,274	43.44%	15,542	50.86%	1,743	5.70%
2004	15,330	45.44%	17,624	52.24%	782	2.32%
2008	12,579	37.73%	20,216	60.64%	542	1.63%
2012	11,115	36.26%	18,961	61.85%	580	1.89%
2016	14,449	45.01%	15,059	46.91%	2,597	8.09%
2020	16,514	46.60%	18,364	51.82%	559	1.58%
2024	18,247	50.95%	17,478	48.80%	92	0.26%

Like much of the North Country region, Clinton County has historically been a Republican county. However, it has voted for Democratic candidates at the state and national level in recent times. Beginning in 1996, it voted for the Democratic candidate for president in every election until 2024. In the 2008 U.S. presidential election, Barack Obama carried the county by a 22.9% margin over John McCain (Obama won every municipality in the county), and won by a 26.9% margin over McCain statewide. In 2006, both Eliot Spitzer and Hillary Clinton carried the county, respectively winning 63% and 64% of the vote. In 2010, Governor Andrew Cuomo and Senators Chuck Schumer and Kirsten Gillibrand won in the county, each receiving more than 60% of the vote. In the 2024 U.S. presidential election, Donald Trump flipped the county by a 2.1% margin over Kamala Harris, despite previously losing the county to Joe Biden by a 5.2% margin in the 2020 U.S. presidential election.

Republicans continue to win most local races. The county's Congressional district did not elect a Democrat to Congress until 2009 when Bill Owens defeated Doug Hoffman in the special election to replace John McHugh, who resigned to serve as the Obama Administration's Secretary of the Army. The special election received nationwide attention due to Hoffman, a third-party candidate and Tea Party favorite, polling higher than the Republican nominee, Dede Scozzafava, which ultimately led to her dropping out of the race and supporting Owens. It had not elected a Democrat to the State Senate or State Assembly in over a half-century until Billy Jones was elected to the State Assembly in 2016. Clinton County is represented by Elise Stefanik in the House of Representatives.

The Clinton County Legislature is the lawmaking body of the county. It consists of 10 members, each elected from single member districts. As of 2021, the County Legislature consisted of five Republicans, four Democrats, and a vacancy.

== Demographics ==
Historical population
Census	Pop.	Note	%±
1790	1,615		—
1800	8,514		427.2%
1810	8,002		−6.0%
1820	12,070		50.8%
1830	19,344		60.3%
1840	28,157		45.6%
1850	40,047		42.2%
1860	45,735		14.2%
1870	47,947		4.8%
1880	50,897		6.2%
1890	46,437		−8.8%
1900	47,430		2.1%
1910	48,230		1.7%
1920	43,898		−9.0%
1930	46,687		6.4%
1940	54,006		15.7%
1950	53,622		−0.7%
1960	72,722		35.6%
1970	72,934		0.3%
1980	80,750		10.7%
1990	85,969		6.5%
2000	79,894		−7.1%
2010	82,128		2.8%
2020	79,843		−2.8%
2025 (est.)	78,138	▼	−2.1%
US Decennial Census; 1790-1960 1900-1990; 1990-2000 2010-2020

|estyear=2023 |estimate=78115 |estref=

=== 2020 census ===
Clinton County, New York – Racial and ethnic composition Note: the US Census treats Hispanic/Latino as an ethnic category. This table excludes Latinos from the racial categories and assigns them to a separate category. Hispanics/Latinos may be of any race.
Race / Ethnicity (NH = Non-Hispanic)	Pop 1980	Pop 1990	Pop 2000	Pop 2010	Pop 2020	% 1980	% 1990	% 2000	% 2010	% 2020
White alone (NH)	76,298	79,647	73,729	74,832	69,251	94.49%	92.65%	92.28%	91.12%	86.73%
Black or African American alone (NH)	2,253	3,330	2,694	2,953	2,753	2.79%	3.87%	3.37%	3.60%	3.45%
Native American or Alaska Native alone (NH)	179	189	256	266	238	0.22%	0.22%	0.32%	0.32%	0.30%
Asian alone (NH)	376	649	527	890	957	0.47%	0.75%	0.66%	1.08%	1.20%
Native Hawaiian or Pacific Islander alone (NH)	x	x	14	15	24	x	x	0.02%	0.02%	0.03%
Other race alone (NH)	209	49	74	112	270	0.26%	0.06%	0.09%	0.14%	0.34%
Mixed race or Multiracial (NH)	x	x	636	1,006	3,494	x	x	0.80%	1.22%	4.38%
Hispanic or Latino (any race)	1,435	2,105	1,964	2,054	2,856	1.78%	2.45%	2.46%	2.50%	3.58%
Total	80,750	85,969	79,894	82,128	79,843	100.00%	100.00%	100.00%	100.00%	100.00%

=== 2000 census ===
As of the 2000 United States census, there were 79,894 people, 29,423 households, and 19,272 families in the county. The population density was 77.0 people per square mile (29.7 people/km^{2}). There were 33,091 housing units at an average density of 31.9 units per square mile (12.3/km^{2}). The racial makeup of the county was 93.33% White, 3.58% Black or African American, 0.36% Native American, 0.67% Asian, 0.02% Pacific Islander, 1.10% from other races, and 0.93% from two or more races. 2.46% of the population were Hispanic or Latino of any race. 23.7% were of French, 15.0% French Canadian, 12.5% American, 11.8% Irish, 7.6% English and 5.5% German ancestry according to Census 2000. 94.1% spoke English, 2.8% French and 1.7% Spanish as their first language.

There were 29,423 households, out of which 32.00% had children under the age of 18 living with them, 51.00% were married couples living together, 10.20% had a female householder with no husband present, and 34.50% were non-families. 26.30% of all households were made up of individuals, and 10.00% had someone living alone who was 65 years of age or older. The average household size was 2.47 and the average family size was 2.98.

The county population contained 23.00% under the age of 18, 12.40% from 18 to 24, 30.60% from 25 to 44, 22.10% from 45 to 64, and 11.90% who were 65 years of age or older. The median age was 36 years. For every 100 females there were 104.90 males. For every 100 females age 18 and over, there were 104.60 males.

The median household income was $37,028, and the median income for a family was $45,732. Males had a median income of $33,788 versus $25,520 for females. The per capita income for the county was $17,946. About 9.40% of families and 13.90% of the population were below the poverty line, including 15.30% of those under age 18 and 11.40% of those age 65 or over.

== Education ==
School districts include:

- AuSable Valley Central School District
- Beekmantown Central School District
- Chateaugay Central School District
- Chazy Union Free School District
- Northeastern Clinton Central School District
- Northern Adirondack Central School District
- Peru Central School District
- Plattsburgh City School District
- Saranac Central School District
- Saranac Lake Central School District

The State University of New York at Plattsburgh is located in the City of Plattsburgh. The county is also served by Clinton Community College, which is located in the Town of Plattsburgh.

== Infrastructure ==
Clinton Correctional Facility, a maximum-security prison is located in the village of Dannemora. Altona Correctional Facility is a medium-security prison in the town of Altona.

== Transportation ==
=== Highways ===
- I-87 - runs N-S, to the Canada–United States border
- US 2
- US 9
- US 11
- NY 3
- NY 9N
- NY 22
- NY 22B
- NY 190
- NY 191
- NY 347
- NY 442
- NY 456

=== Airports ===
- Plattsburgh International Airport (PBG) – Plattsburgh
- Clinton County Airport (PLB) – Plattsburgh
- Rouses Point Seaplane Base (K21) – Rouses Point

=== Rail ===
Amtrak's Adirondack Train travels through the county, connecting Montreal to New York City. Two trains a day (one north and one south) stop in the county in Plattsburgh and Rouses Point.

=== Mass transit ===
The Clinton County Public Transit runs bus routes that branch from Plattsburgh to towns in the county.

== Communities ==
=== Larger settlements ===
#	Location	Population	Type	Area
1	†Plattsburgh	19,989	City	Champlain Shore
2	Dannemora	3,936	Village	Mainland
3	Rouses Point	2,209	Village	Champlain Shore
4	‡Keeseville	1,815	CDP	Adirondack Park
5	Cumberland Head	1,627	CDP	Champlain Shore
6	Peru	1,591	CDP	Adirondack Park
7	Morrisonville	1,545	CDP	Mainland
8	Plattsburgh West	1,364	CDP	Mainland
9	Champlain	1,101	Village	Mainland
10	Altona	730	CDP	Mainland
11	Chazy	565	CDP	Champlain Shore
12	Au Sable Forks	559	CDP	Adirondack Park
13	West Chazy	529	CDP	Mainland
14	Cadyville	479	CDP	Mainland
15	Redford	477	CDP	Adirondack Park
16	††Mooers	442	CDP	Mainland
17	Lyon Mountain	423	CDP	Adirondack Park
18	Parc	254	CDP	Champlain Shore

† - County seat

†† - Former village

‡ - Not wholly in this county

=== Towns ===
- Altona
- Au Sable
- Beekmantown
- Black Brook
- Champlain
- Chazy
- Clinton
- Dannemora
- Ellenburg
- Mooers
- Peru
- Plattsburgh
- Saranac
- Schuyler Falls

=== Hamlets ===
- Churubusco
- Coopersville
- Swastika
- Morrisonville

== See also ==
- Lake Champlain
- Cumberland Head
- SUNY Plattsburgh
- List of counties in New York
- National Register of Historic Places listings in Clinton County, New York
