= Saranac Central School District =

School district in New York, United States

Address
- 32 Emmons Street Dannemora, New York, 12929; United States

District information
- Type: Public
- Grades: PreK–12
- NCES District ID: 3600009

Students and staff
- Students: 1,497
- Teachers: 124.62
- Staff: 181.75
- Student–teacher ratio: 12.01

Other information
- Website: www.saranac.org

Saranac Central School District is a school district headquartered in Dannemora, New York.

In 2019 there was an election for a capital project, approved by voters 181–93. It was worth $19.2 million.

The district has a tax levy cap. In June 2020 the budget had a decline in expenditures.

Schools:

- Saranac Central High School
- Saranac Central Middle School
- Morrisonville Elementary School
- Saranac Elementary School
