= Kaydeross Railroad =

Trolley line in New York State

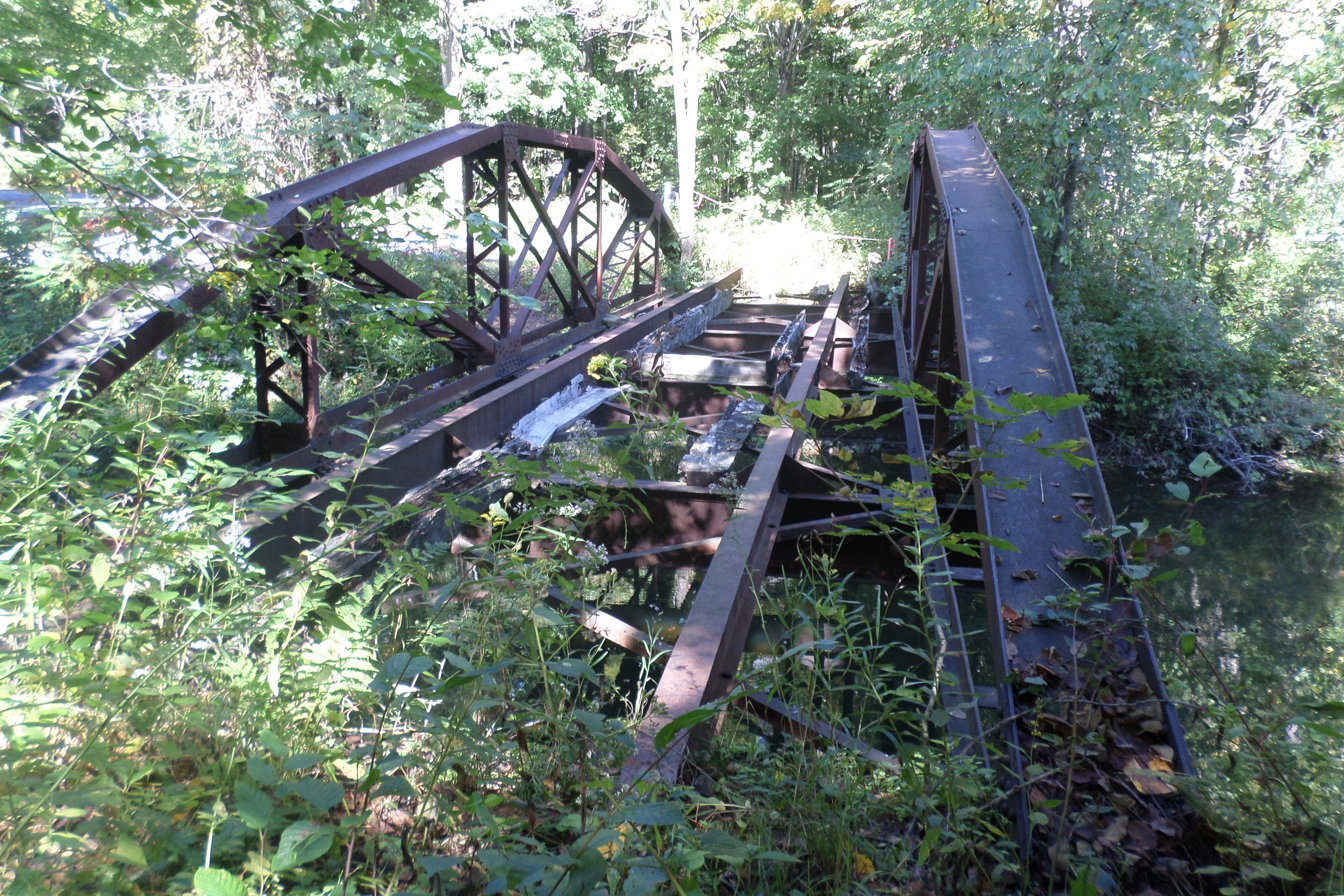
- Abandoned Kaydeross Railroad bridge crossing Kaydeross Creek near Rock City Falls in 2016

Overview
- Other name(s): Ballston Terminal Railroad
- Status: Ceased operation
- Locale: Saratoga County, New York
- Termini: Ballston Spa, New York; Middle Grove, New York

Service
- Type: Electric trolley; overhead wires
- Services: 1
- Depot(s): Ballston Spa, New York

History
- Opened: 1896
- Closed: 1929

Technical
- Line length: 12 mi (19 km)
- Track length: 15 mi (24 km)
- Number of tracks: 1
- Character: At-grade
- Track gauge: 1,435 mm (4 ft 8 1/2 in)
- Electrification: Trolley wire

The Kaydeross Railroad, earlier known as the Eastern New York Railroad and Ballston Terminal Railroad, was an electric-powered trolley line that served industries along the Kayaderosseras Creek in the town of Milton, Saratoga County, New York. It was a "terminal railroad", which means it had an interchange at one end (in Ballston Spa) but terminated without any other interchange.

The railroad's primary purpose was to serve the dozen water-powered paper mills and a large tool factory that were situated along the creek. These included the paper mills and bag factory of "Paper Bag King" George West, the famous Ballston Scythe & Axe Works of Isaiah Blood, the paper box mill of the National Folding Paper Box Company, and the straw paper mill of Chauncey Kilmer (later the Cottrell Paper Company).

The railroad was unique for being one of the few trolley railroads in the country to have a primary function of hauling freight cars. At least eight freight cars could be hauled by the George West trolley car to the Delaware and Hudson Railway interchange track on present day New York State Route 50.

Construction started in 1896 when an investor group headed by Arthur B. Paine was granted a franchise by the Village of Ballston Spa. By 1902 the railroad reached its greatest extent of twelve miles (15 miles including sidings). It served the villages and hamlets of Ballston Spa, Bloodville, Factory Village, Craneville, Milton Center, West Milton, Rock City Falls, and Middle Grove. A regular schedule was instituted to accommodate passengers.

The railroad was never a financial success. The Ballston Terminal Railroad Corporation declared bankruptcy in 1904, but a new corporation was formed called the Eastern New York Railroad, and operations continued uninterrupted. In 1918 the line was sold to I. W. Wiswall for $25,000 ($430,000 in 2018 dollars). Another reorganization occurred when several paper mill owners banded together and purchased the ailing railroad. It was thereafter called the Kaydeross Railroad Company. This line operated until 1929, when it shut down for the last time. By then, only three paper mills had survived. However, the railroad served its primary purpose of providing inexpensive transportation and distribution and contributed to the longevity of the industries it served.

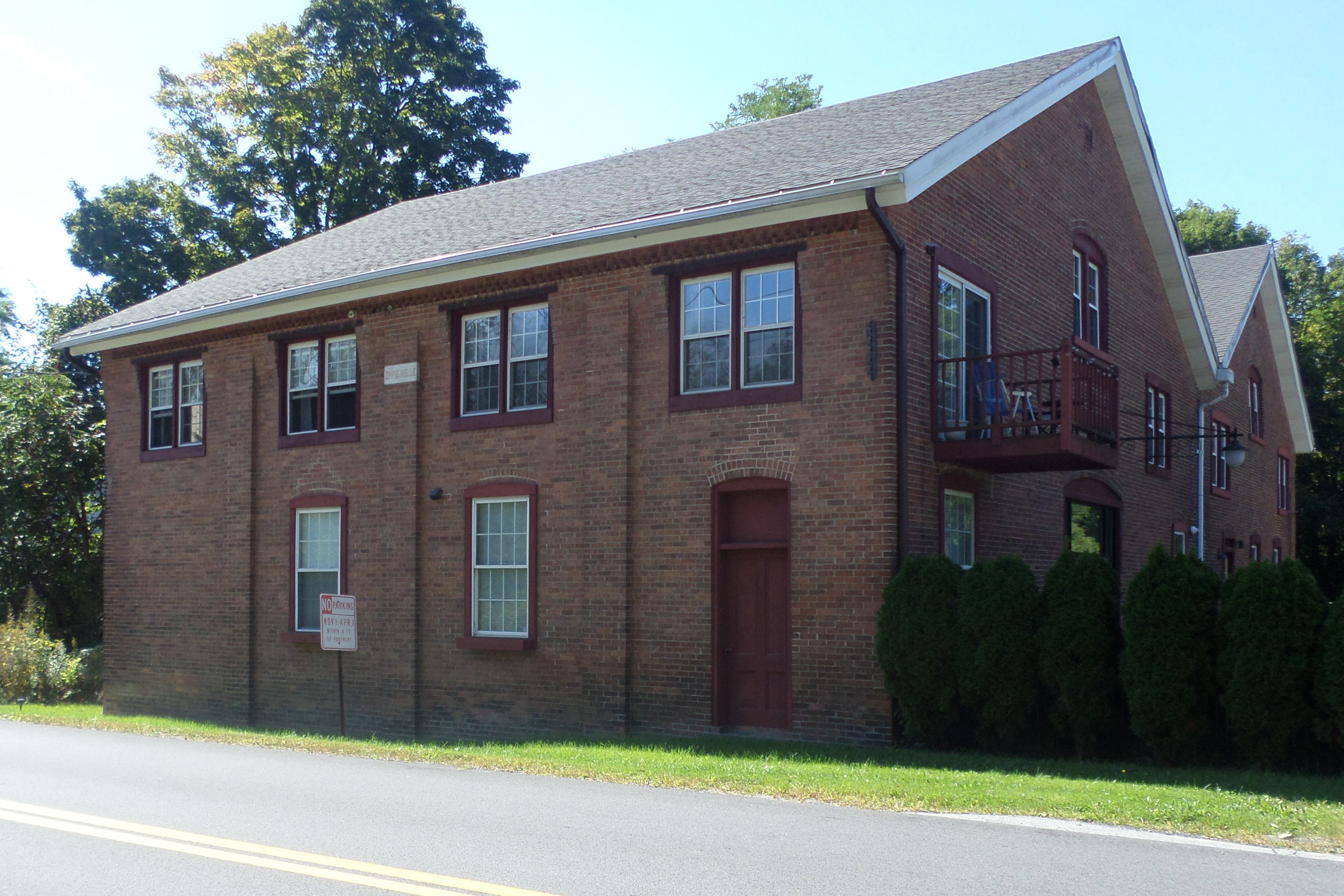
Former Kaydeross Railroad powerhouse near Factory Village in 2016

Little of the railroad remains today. The brick powerhouse still survives in Factory Village, and approximately one mile of the former railroad bed is now a walking trail in Boice Park in Milton. Other stretches of old track bed can still be seen in the woods north of Ballston Spa. An iron bridge over the Kayaderosseras still stands on Heisler Road in Rock City Falls.
