= Saratoga Springs High School =

Coordinates: 43°4′24.2″N 73°47′57.2″W

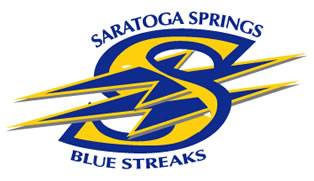

Location
- 1 Blue Streak Boulevard; Saratoga Springs, New York 12866

Information
- School type: Public high school
- School district: Saratoga Springs City School District
- Superintendent: Michael Patton
- Principal: Michelle Tsao
- Staff: 144.35 (FTE)
- Grades: 9–12
- Enrollment: 1,871 (2023-2024)
- Student to teacher ratio: 12.96
- Language: English
- Campus: Urban
- Colors: Blue and White
- Mascot: Blue Streaks
- Newspaper: The Lightning Rod
- Yearbook: The Recorder
- Communities served: City of Saratoga Springs, Town of Wilton (part), Town of Greenfield (part), Town of Milton (part), Town of Malta (part), Town of Saratoga (part)
- Feeder schools: Caroline Street Elementary, Division Street Elementary, Dorothy Nolan Elementary, Geyser Road Elementary: Greenfield Elementary, Lake Avenue Elementary, Maple Avenue Middle School
- Alumni: https://www.saratogaschools.org/about-us/alumni/
- Athletic Conference: Suburban Council
- Website: Saratoga Springs High School

Saratoga Springs High School is a public high school in Saratoga Springs, New York. The school was originally located on Lake Avenue, relocating to its current location prior to 1969. The current campus was renovated in 2002. The school's drama club and cross country teams consistently rank high in competitions. Its sport teams are called the Blue Streaks.

== In the news ==
The school made national news in 1966, when 18-year-old Sharon Ann Dalrymple was sent home for wearing slacks. Her parents appealed the decision to the State Education Department.

An alumnus of the school disrupted the graduation ceremony held at the Saratoga Performing Arts Center in 2008, running across the stage dressed in a costume modeled on male genitalia.

In 2024, media reported on track coaches Art and Linda Kranick who had purportedly abused their authority over the course of over 35 years. They allegedly denied student athletes a day off, attempted to influence runners’ diets, weekend schedules, vitamin supplements, and orthotic shoe inserts. Art Kranick died in 2025.

== Notable alumni ==
- Stacey Fox (1983), musician, filmmaker, animator
- Don Pepper (1961), baseball player
- David Hyde Pierce (1977), actor
- Matt Rhoades (1993), Republican political operative, manager of Mitt Romney's 2012 presidential campaign
- Matt Riddle (2004), mixed martial artist and professional wrestler
- Scott Valentine (1976), actor
- Anthony Weaver (1998), football player.
