= Milton, New York =

Milton, New York can refer to the following places in New York:

- Milton (town), New York - a town in Saratoga County
  - Milton (CDP), Saratoga County, New York - a census-designated place in the town of Milton
- Milton, Ulster County, New York - a hamlet and census-designated place
