= Stewart's Shops =

U.S. convenience store chain

- Type: Privately held company
- Industry: Convenience store
- Founded: Ballston Spa, New York (1945; 81 years ago)
- Headquarters: Ballston Spa (Saratoga Springs), New York, US
- Number of locations: 400+
- Area served: Upstate New York, Vermont, and northeastern New Hampshire
- Key people: Chairman: William Dake; CEO: Gary Dake; President: Chad Kiesow; Treasurer: Ryan Shaw
- Products: Ice cream, coffee, gasoline (most)
- Revenue: $1.7+ billion
- Net income: $30 million
- Number of employees: 4,500+
- Website: stewartsshops.com

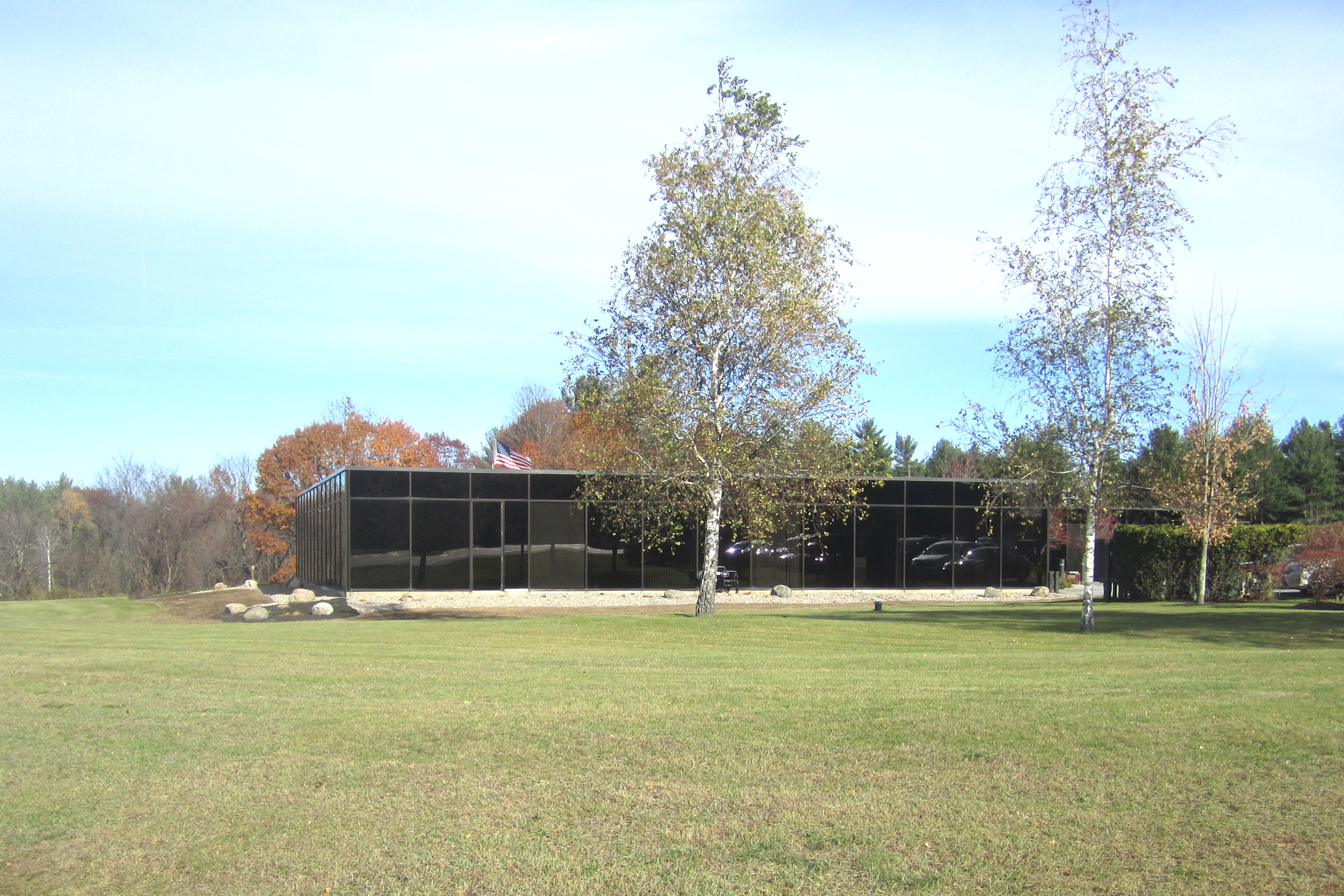
Stewart's headquarters, Malta, New York

Stewart's Shops is an American regional chain of convenience stores located in upstate New York, Vermont, and New Hampshire. The company is owned by the Dake family and its employees.

Stewart's is headquartered in Ballston Spa (with a Saratoga Springs address). The company is well-established, particularly in the Capital District, Adirondacks and North Country with over 350 locations. In New York, its footprint stretches as far north as the Canada–US border, as far west as Oswego, and as far south as Goshen at the northern fringe of the New York metropolitan area. Its Vermont outlets can be found in Rutland, Bennington, and Franklin counties.

Stewart's is known for branded ice cream, potato chips, hard rolls, soft drinks, milk, and coffee.

Three-fourths of their stores also sell gasoline—either their own brand or in partnership with Sunoco. In addition, most also feature a small dining area.

There are now 406 Stewart's Shops in operation throughout the three states.

== History ==
=== Preformation (1917–1945) ===
Stewart's traces its origins to Percy and Charles V. Dake taking over the family dairy farm in Middle Grove in 1917. They began making Dake's Delicious Ice Cream beginning in 1921.

Fourteen years later, the brothers started Saratoga Dairy in an old barn in Saratoga Springs. This move occurred in the same year that New York began requiring all milk to be pasteurized.

In 1938 they expanded into the city's old water works and then went into making cheese, powdered whey, and casein two years afterward, following another new property purchase, this time in Greenfield. These products were sold all over the Northeast, as far south as Maryland.

=== Establishment (1945–1959, The first generation of Dakes) ===
As the war ended in 1945, the brothers bought an ice cream production facility in Ballston Spa from Donald Stewart. Charles S. "Charlie" Dake, Charles V.'s son, newly discharged from the military and looking for something to do, decided to start selling Stewart's Ice Cream to the public fresh off the line in the factory storefront. This is considered to be the first Stewart's Shop.

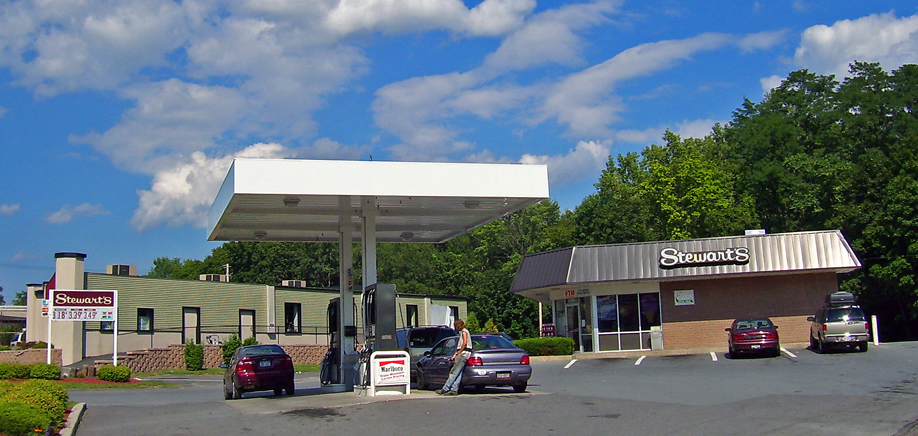
A typical Stewart's, this one in Walden, New York

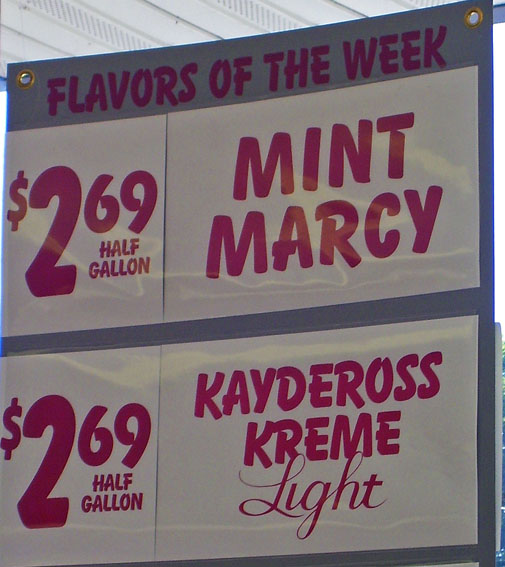
Stewart's alludes to its Adirondack and North Country origins with ice cream flavors that play on regional place names. These reference Mount Marcy and Kayaderosseras (pronounced Kaydeross) Creek.

Two others quickly followed, in Saratoga Springs and South Glens Falls. They were popular since ice cream and other sweet foods had been tightly rationed during World War II. In 1948 the company introduced the folding paper ice cream carton so customers could bring home fresh ice cream more cheaply. The new design also made it easier for people to purchase and store larger quantities of ice cream. The new design also shifted consumers' habits, encouraging them to take home their purchases rather than consuming them on the spot. However, the more notable innovation of the year came from Charlie Dake's wife Phyllis, often called "Philly" Dake, who suggested allowing people to make their own sundaes from a choice of toppings, a practice that would pass the test of time for generations to come. The company's Philly Vanilla ice cream was named in her honor. The new carton design, along with the rising demand for ice cream, resulted in increased sales of Stewart's products.

Saratoga Dairy and Stewart's Ice Cream were formally incorporated with the state in 1950, and ice cream production was moved back to the Greenfield facility, which could handle the increased demand. By 1955 there were over 50 Stewart's Shops.

1957 saw a regulatory battle between the companies and the New York State Department of Agriculture and Markets for the right to sell the company's own milk in its own stores. It was resolved in Stewart's favor, and as a result of this vertical integration, retail milk prices in the stores dropped by 25%.

=== Expansion (1959–2003, The second generation of Dakes) ===
The younger Dake took over the company from his uncle in 1959 and the following year brought his brother, William "Bill" Dake, in. The holder of a graduate degree in engineering from Cornell University, William was able to solve some production problems at the dairy, and as a result it began running at a profit. Over the course of the 1960s, the new Dake brothers turned the company into one of the East's largest private dairies.

Charlie Dake died of cancer in 1978, leaving Bill to carry on the business. In 1984, Bill's son, Gary, joined the company, and Bill began training him to take over. A decade later, the company built a new dairy facility and bought the Bonfare chain, adding 40 stores at a single stroke. In the late 1990s, it began aggressively expanding out of its base in the Capital District, pushing south into the mid-Hudson Valley for the first time.

=== Current (2003–present, the third generation of Dakes) ===
In 2003 Gary became president of the company, while his father became chairman. Gary is the third generation of Dakes to helm the company. The Dake family are not the only owners of Stewart's Shops: the company has long believed in employee ownership and nearly 40% of its stock is held by employees through the Employee Stock Ownership Plan (ESOP), known as "Profit Sharing." Employees who work more than 1,000 hours a year become eligible for this kind of stock. In 2017, the company is said to have contributed $11 million to it. The ESOP plan has resulted in 174 employees owning $1 million of company stock. The ESOP plan empowers its workers, allowing them to be part of the bigger picture. Long term employees of Stewart's Shops have gained wealth due to the company's unique business model. However, ESOP plans have been criticized since they are legally limited by what someone believes is a "fair market value", meaning employees cannot sell their stock at prices above this specified value.

In December 2024, Stewart's Shops acquired the Jolley brand of convenience stores, allowing the company to expand its reach into New Hampshire.

In June 2025, Chad Kiesow was appointed president, the first person in that role outside the Dake family in its history. At the time, it was announced that previous president Gary Dake would stay on as chief executive officer.
