= Union Mill Complex =

- U.S. National Register of Historic Places
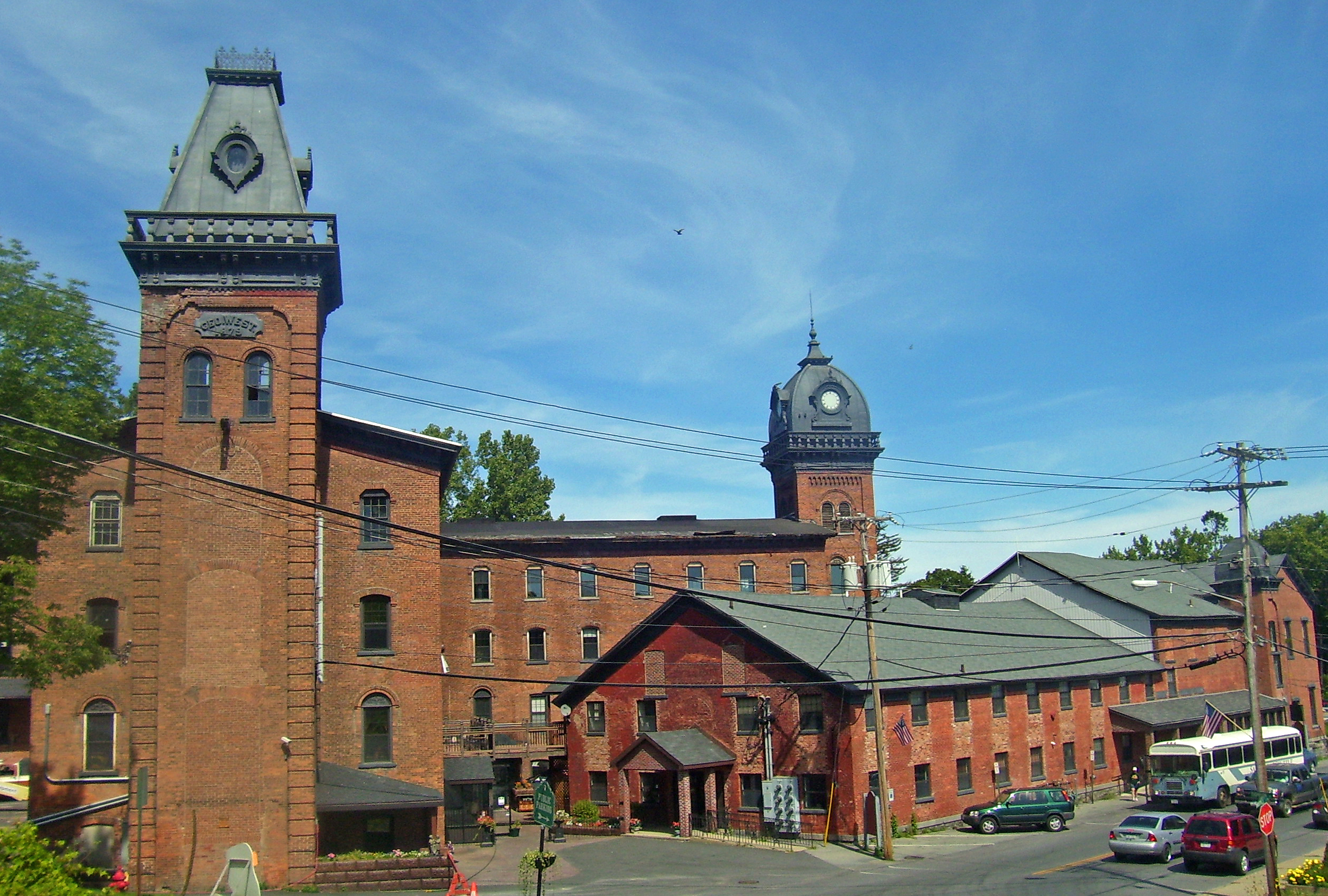
- Union Mill (left), West Bag Factory and George West Office Building, from Prospect Street, 2008
- Location: Ballston Spa, NY
- Nearest city: Saratoga Springs
- Coordinates: 43°0′30″N 73°51′1″W
- Area: 4 acres (1.6 ha)
- Built: 1850 – 1886; 140 years ago
- Architect: R.N. Brezee
- Architectural style: Italianate, Second Empire
- NRHP reference No.: 82003404
- Added to NRHP: June 17, 1982

The Union Mill Complex, (also Bischoff's Chocolate Factory), is located at the junction of Milton Avenue (NY 50) and Prospect Street in Ballston Spa, New York, United States. It is a complex of three late 19th-century brick buildings on a 4-acre (1.6 ha) lot, and the ruins of a dam.

Originally built to harness the nearby Kayaderosseras Creek for textile production, in the years of the Gilded Age, George West converted it to paper bag production and made the center of his company. It later became a chocolate factory, and then a warehouse for a local plastics concern. In 1982 it was listed on the National Register of Historic Places, and is now used as a retail complex.

== Property ==
The property is a wedge-shaped parcel with Milton Avenue on the east, the Kayaderosseras Creek on the north and Prospect Street to the south and west. There is a slight rise on the west, and the complex is built into that. The surrounding neighborhood, downtown Ballston Spa, is mostly commercial. The Register listing includes three buildings — the George West Office Building, Union Mill and West Bag Factory — and one structure, the ruins of the former dam that began the industrial use of the property.

All three buildings are built of brick laid in common bond with pressed metal roofs. Metal is also used for many of the decorative touches, such as iron finials, window caps, balustrades, cornices and dormer windows.

The mill itself is an L-shaped four-story building with two stair towers in the late Second Empire style, with corbeled brickwork and cast iron detailing. The original timber framing has been replaced by reinforced concrete on the lower stories. The east tower has a clock face in one dormer and a 1,500-pound (680 kg) bell, cast by Jones & Co. of Troy.

The bag factory is a two-and-a-half–story 3-by-16-bay gabled building. The windows have flat-arched lintels and hammered limestone sills. The attic windows in the gable ends have been bricked over. It retains the exposed timber rafters and Italianate metal monitors. Its structural system is the original timber.

On its east is the George West Office Building, later converted into a creamery. It is a five-by-three-bay two-story gabled structure with a perpendicularly attached nine-by-three-bay gabled single-story wing. On the south elevation is a 2 1/2-story tower with metallic mansard roof dormers and bracketed cornice.

The mill and office building retain much of their original finishing. The former, redecorated in a Queen Anne mode by Saratoga Springs architect R.N. Brezee, features oak and cherry wainscoting, a highly decorated cashier's desk and walk-in vault. Similarly, the bag factory has a wainscoted cashier's office with pay windows, staircase with two open flight and varnished newel posts with turned balusters. It, too, has a walk-in vault. The owner's office overlooking Prospect Street has paneled and varnished cherry wainscoting, tiled fireplace, and pedimented cherry window moldings.

The factory has no significant decorative touches. There is no historical machinery left in it or either of the other buildings.

Behind the buildings, the Blue Mill Dam on the creek was demolished in the mid-20th century. Some of its stone piers remain.

== History ==
=== Early history ===
Development of the property began around 1830, when Hezekiah Middlebrook first dammed the creek. The Ballston Mill Company built the first cotton mill there in 1844. Six years later, in 1850, they added a woolen mill, the current Bag Factory.

In 1878 fire destroyed the original Union Cotton Mill. The following year George West bought the property.

=== The George West era ===
George West had profited during the Civil War when he invented the flat-bottomed paper bag, the first which could hold as much as 50 pounds (23 kg). After the fire he bought the property and built the current structure, renaming it the Union Paper Mill. Power came from a renovated flume and the turbine from the cotton mill. He also enlarged the wool mill and turned it into a bag factory.

Over the next six years the office building was built, intended to be a showpiece of contemporary office design. In 1882 the dam was destroyed in a flood and rebuilt. The clock tower was illuminated with electric light in 1885, followed by the whole mill the next year. The dam was breached and rebuilt in 1886 as well, only to be breached again by another flood.

West enlarged the main mill building again in 1889. By this point the complex was the headquarters of a company that operated nine mills, two factories and a pulp mill in northern Saratoga County. He sold his holdings to the Union Bag & Paper Company in 1899.

=== Bischoff's chocolates ===
In 1918 the buildings were sold to German immigrant Frederick Bischoff. His chocolate company had outgrown its original location in Brooklyn and needed new space quickly. A Philadelphia firm renovated the interiors extensively for its new use and shored up the mill with steel and reinforced concrete. All the original machinery was removed by 1920.

Bischoff installed colored lights to illuminate the water falling over the dam and made other improvements to the immediate vicinity. Bischoff died in 1942.

In 1945 wartime chocolate shortages forced the plant to close. The dam collapsed in 1947 and was not rebuilt.

=== Later history ===
The complex was sold at auction in 1950 and experienced a variety of owners including a knitting company and Tufflite Plastics, a local company which made plastic products, and used the mill as a warehouse. Tufflite closed in the late 1990s.

In 1997 the complex underwent extensive interior renovation and was converted into space for small retailers, professional offices, and a restaurant.

== See also ==
- National Register of Historic Places listings in Saratoga County, New York
