= Saratoga Springs City School District =

School district in the U.S. state of New York

Location
- Saratoga Springs, New York United States

District information
- Type: Public
- Grades: Pre-kindergarten, K-12
- Established: 1923
- Superintendent: Dr. Michael Patton
- Budget: ▲US$117 million

Students and staff
- Students: 6,442

Other information
- Unions: NYSUT, CSEA, SAANYS
- Website: www.saratogaschools.org

The Saratoga Springs City School District is the public school district of Saratoga Springs, New York. The district is an independent public entity. It is governed by the Saratoga Springs City School District Board of Education, whose members are elected in non-partisan elections for staggered, three-year terms. The board selects a superintendent, who is the district's chief administrative official. The district's offices are located in the former Junior High building on 3 Blue Streak Boulevard, next to the high school.

The district has six elementary schools, one middle school, and one comprehensive high school serving about 6,400 students. As of 2015, it spends an average of $16,161 per pupil and has a student to teacher ratio of 14.3 (the national averages are $12,435 and 15.3 respectively).

The district serves students from the city of Saratoga Springs and the Saratoga County towns of Milton, Wilton, Malta, Greenfield and Saratoga.

== Schools ==
Secondary schools

- Saratoga Springs High School - comprehensive high school (9th-12th Grade)
- Maple Avenue Middle School (6th-8th Grade)

Elementary schools

- Caroline Street Elementary School (Pre K- Grade 5)
- Division Street Elementary School (Pre K- Grade 5)
- Dorothy Nolan Elementary School (Pre K- Grade 5)
- Geyser Road Elementary School (Pre K- Grade 5)
- Greenfield Elementary School (Pre K- Grade 5)
- Lake Avenue Elementary School (former location of Saratoga Springs High School) (Pre K- Grade 5)

== Board of education ==
There are nine (9) Board members. They are elected in the school budget elections in May to staggered three-year terms, which expire on June 30:

- Tony Krackeler (President, elected in 2020, term expires in 2023)
- Natalya Lakhtakia (Vice President, elected in 2019, re-elected in 2022, term expires in 2025)
- Dr. John Brueggemann (elected in 2019, re-elected in 2022, term expires in 2025)
- Erika Borman (elected in 2020, term expires in 2023)
- John Ellis (elected in 2015, re-elected in 2018 and 2021, term expires in 2024)
- Amanda Ellithorpe (elected in 2021, term expires in 2024)
- Anjeanette Emeka (elected in 2017, re-elected in 2020, term expires in 2023)
- Dean A. Kolligian Jr. (elected in 2019, re-elected in 2022, term expires in 2025)
- Connie Woytowich (elected in 2021, term expires in 2024)
