= North Ballston Spa, New York =

- Census-designated place
- Location within New York Location within the United States
- Coordinates: 43°1′11″N 73°51′11″W
- Country: United States
- State: New York
- County: Saratoga
- Town: Milton

Area
  - Total: 0.87 sq mi (2.26 km^{2})
  - Land: 0.87 sq mi (2.25 km^{2})
  - Water: 0.0039 sq mi (0.01 km^{2})
- Elevation: 407 ft (124 m)

Population (2020)
  - Total: 1,376
  - Density: 1,583.9/sq mi (611.55/km^{2})
- Time zone: UTC-5 (Eastern (EST))
  - Summer (DST): UTC-4 (EDT)
- ZIP Code: 12020 (Ballston Spa)
- Area codes: 518/838
- FIPS code: 36-51467
- GNIS feature ID: 2389561

North Ballston Spa is a census-designated place (CDP) within the town of Milton in Saratoga County, New York, United States. As of the 2020 census, it had a population of 1,376.

The CDP is southwest of the center of Saratoga County, in the southeastern corner of the town of Milton. It is bordered to the south by the village of Ballston Spa, the Saratoga county seat; to the north by the Milton CDP; and to the east by the city of Saratoga Springs, the largest city in the county.

New York State Route 50 runs through North Ballston Spa, connecting Ballston Spa and Saratoga Springs.

== Demographics ==
Historical population
Census	Pop.	Note	%±
2020	1,376		—
U.S. Decennial Census
