= Senator Blood =

Senator Blood may refer to:

- Carol Blood (born 1961), Nebraska State Senate
- Isaiah Blood (1810–1870), New York State Senate
- Robert O. Blood (1887–1975), New Hampshire State Senate
