= Don Pepper =

American baseball player (born 1943)

- Pinch hitter/First baseman
- Born: October 8, 1943 (age 82); Saratoga Springs, New York, U.S.
- Batted: Left Threw: Right

MLB debut
- September 10, 1966, for the Detroit Tigers

Last MLB appearance
- October 2, 1966, for the Detroit Tigers

MLB statistics
- Games played: 4
- At bats: 3
- Hits: 0
- Stats at Baseball Reference

Teams
- Detroit Tigers (1966)

Donald Hoyte Pepper (born October 8, 1943) is an American former professional baseball player. He was a first baseman whose seven-year (1962–1968) professional career included a four-game trial in the majors with the Detroit Tigers in 1966. Pepper batted left handed and threw right-handed, at 6 ft 4 in (1.93 m) and 215 pounds (98 kg).

Pepper graduated from Saratoga Springs High School in 1961 and signed with the Tigers for $15,000 (equivalent to $161,600 in 2025).

Pepper's career was spent with the Detroit organization. In his best season, 1966 with the Double-A Montgomery Rebels, he batted .302 and reached career highs in home runs (19) and runs batted in (87). Called up to the Tigers after the post-September 1 roster expansion, Pepper was a pinch hitter in three contests (he grounded out, struck out, and flied out in his three at bats). In his fourth game, he was a defensive replacement for veteran Tiger first baseman Norm Cash, but did not bat.

At age 24, Pepper made the cover of Sports Illustrated in March 1968, along with Johnny Bench, Cisco Carlos, Alan Foster, and Mike Torrez, as "The Best Rookies of 1968."

In 1969, Pepper refused a minor league assignment and retired, moving home to Wilton, New York to work on his family's turkey farm.

He is the father of Dottie Pepper, a professional golfer and golf commentator.
