= Bloodville, New York =

Hamlet in New York, United States

Coordinates: 43.014°N 73.861°W

Bloodville is a hamlet of Ballston Spa, Saratoga County, New York, United States.

== History ==
It is named after Isaiah Blood, who operated the Ballston Axe & Scythe Works beginning in 1831.

The factories were located on the Kayaderosseras Creek just north of Ballston Spa, and consisted of the lower mill, for the manufacture of axes, and the upper mill, for the manufacture of scythes. Several fires destroyed the two enterprises, but they were rebuilt at a much greater capacity in the 1860s.

From Nathaniel Bartlett Sylvester's "History of Saratoga County, New York," 1878:

The edge tool property remained in the hands of its founders until Blood's death in November, 1870; it then passed into the hands of his son-in-law, Henry Knickerbocker, a banker and broker in New York. The business requires from 200 to 250 hands. The quantity of goods sold yearly is simply immense - twelve thousand dozen of scythes, eight thousand dozen of axes, and ten thousand dozen of other tools.

Bloodville also contained the lumber-yard, planing mill, and sash factory of Benjamin Barber, who was the inventor and manufacturer of a popular and nationally renowned water wheel.

During its peak in the 1890s, the hamlet contained several stores, churches, a schoolhouse, and a trolley railroad called The Ballston Terminal Railroad. The tool factories were purchased by the American Axe & Tool Company (the hard edge tool trust) in 1892, but ten years later, both enterprises were completely destroyed in two separate fires. Today the hamlet is a popular residential area.
