= Middle Grove, New York =

- Hamlet
- Location within New York Location within the United States
- Coordinates: 43°05′23″N 73°55′04″W
- Country: United States
- State: New York
- County: Saratoga
- Elevation: 551 ft (168 m)
- Time zone: UTC-5 (Eastern (EST))
  - Summer (DST): UTC-4 (EDT)
- ZIP code: 12850
- Area codes: 518 & 838
- GNIS feature ID: 957104

Middle Grove is a hamlet in the town of Greenfield, New York. The community is 6.8 miles (10.9 km) west of Saratoga Springs. Middle Grove has a post office with ZIP code 12850.

Middle Grove is located along the Kayaderosseras creek. The first sawmill in the town of Greenfield was established here in 1786, and it was the site of several paper mills. Middle Grove was the terminus of the Kaydeross Railroad.

The trailheads of the Hennig Preserve are located in Middle Grove. The preserve is 606 acres (245 ha) of forests, creeks, and ponds open for hiking and cross-country skiing.
