= George West House =

Historic house in New York, United States

- U.S. National Register of Historic Places
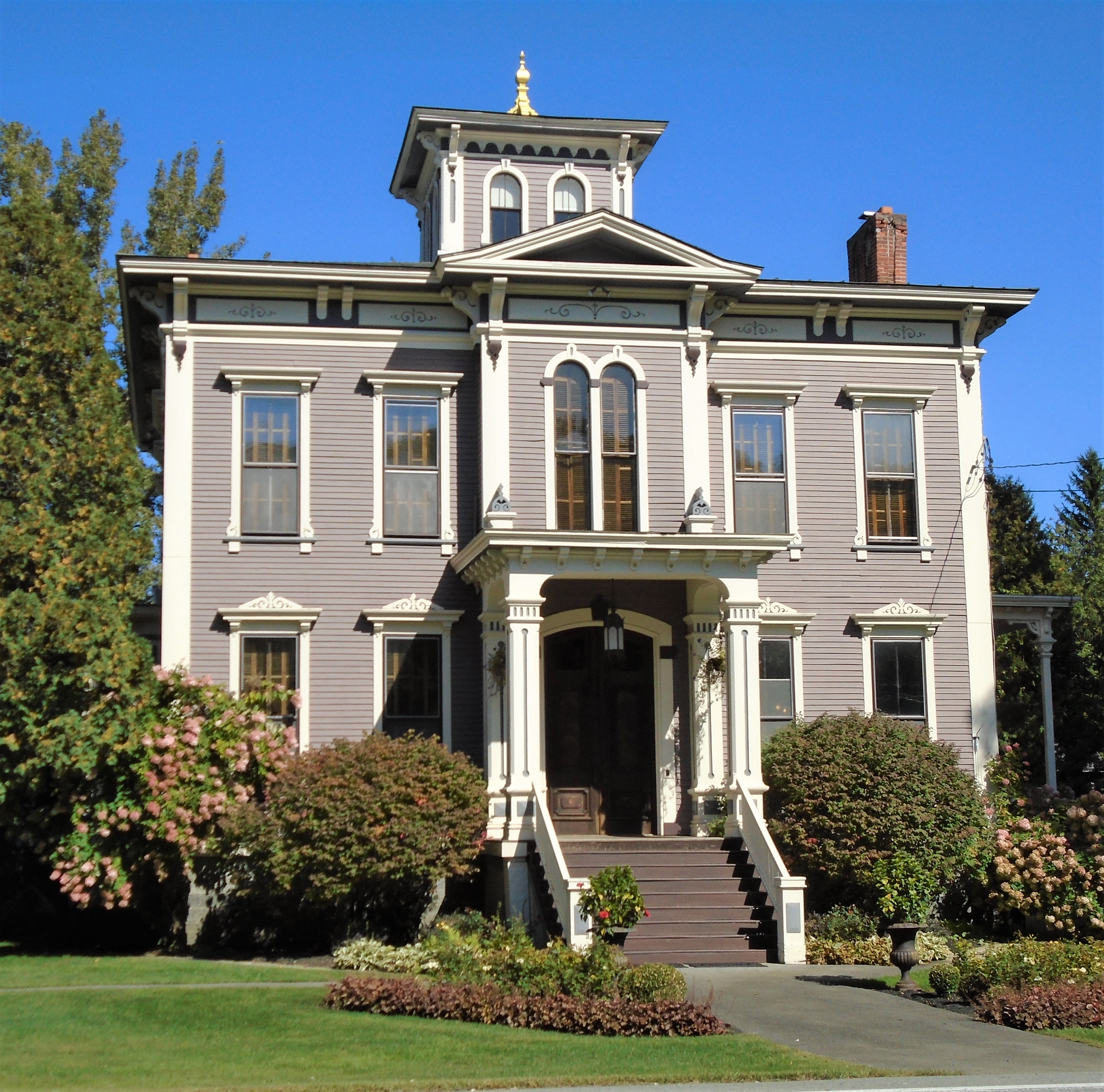
- (2020)

- Location within New York Location within the United States
- Location: 801 NY 29, Rock City Falls, New York
- Coordinates: 43°3′59″N 73°55′38″W
- Area: 3.1 acres (1.3 ha)
- Built: 1866
- Architectural style: Italian Villa
- NRHP reference No.: 05000312
- Added to NRHP: April 20, 2005

George West House is a historic home located at 801 NY-29 in Rock City Falls in Saratoga County, New York. It was built in 1866 for prominent industrialist and congressman George West, known as the "Paper Bag King" for his invention of the folded paper bag.

The house is a two-story, wood-framed hipped-roofed residence in the Italian Villa style. It features a projecting full-height entrance pavilion and an ornate, flat-roofed entrance portico. It also has an enclosed, hip-roofed belvedere with decorative finials situated at the center of the roof. Also on the property is a contributing carriage barn and corncrib.

It was added to the National Register of Historic Places in 2005.
