= Rock City Falls, New York =

Rock City Falls
- hamlet
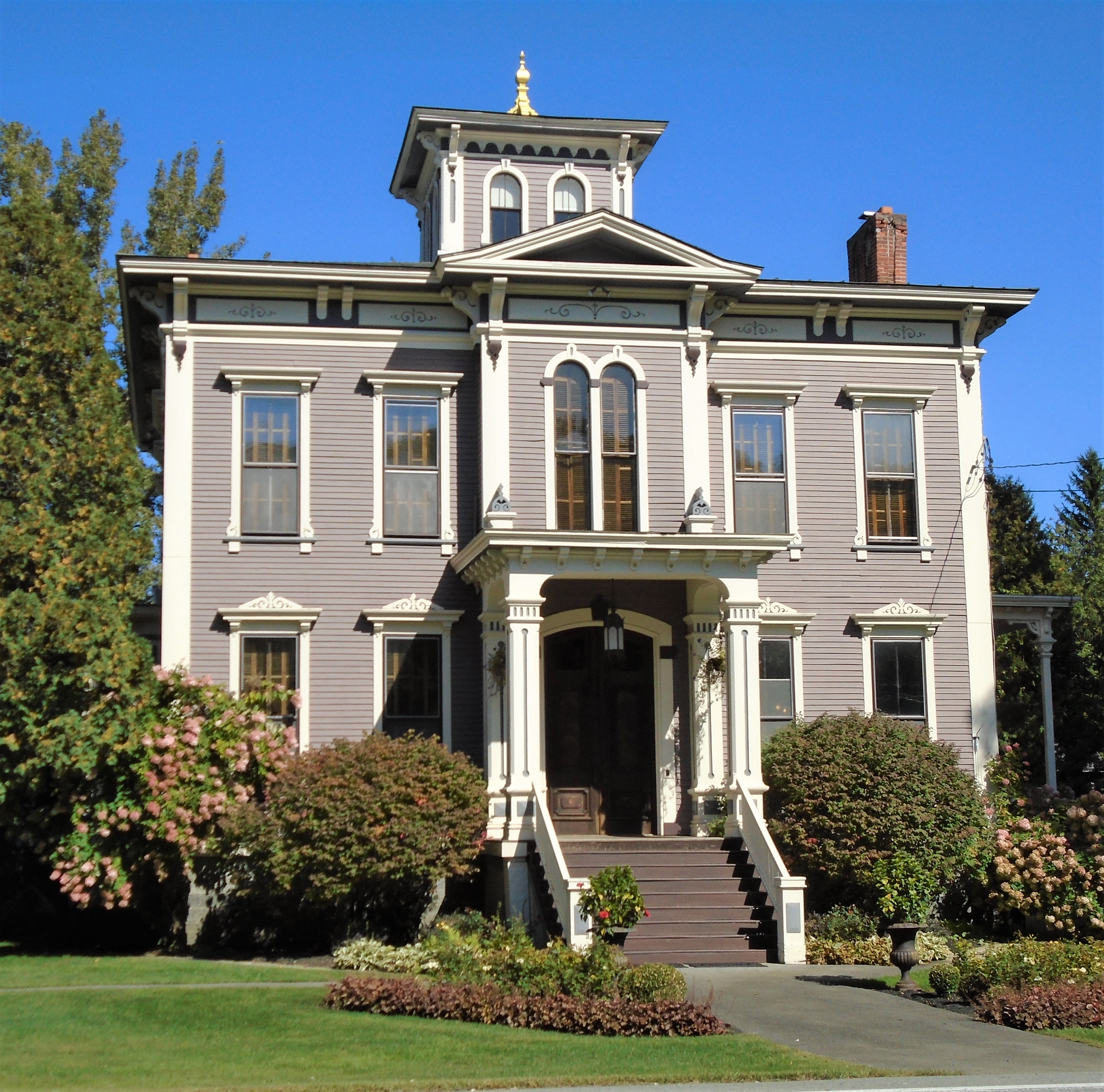
- George West House (2020)

- Location within the state of New York
- Coordinates: 43°03′43″N 73°55′01″W
- Country: United States
- State: New York
- County: Saratoga
- Time zone: UTC-5 (Eastern (EST))
  - Summer (DST): UTC-4 (EDT)
- ZIP codes: 12863
- Area code: 518
- GNIS feature ID: 962699

Rock City Falls is a hamlet in the town of Milton, Saratoga County, New York, United States. The principal roads are Route 29 and Rock City Falls Road. The hamlet achieved fame as the origins of Paper Bag King George West, who established his Empire Mill there in 1862. He went on to build the Excelsior Mill next door in 1866 and a mansion across the street. The George West House was listed on the National Register of Historic Places in 2005.

There were saw and grist-mills in the upper part of Rock City before 1800, usually known then as the Hatch mills, though owned by Swan. This was the first use of the splendid water-power at that point. Not much later than that, however, another one was erected by Rathbone, the first settler at the hamlet of Rock City. There were two brothers Rathbone, one the pioneer merchant and landlord, the other the mill-owner. One of them afterwards removed to Greenfield.

From 1898 to 1929, the hamlet was served by The Ballston Terminal Railroad, an electric trolley that hauled freight cars for the paper mills and carried passengers to Ballston Spa.

Today Rock City Falls is largely residential, although the Cottrell Paper Company still operates much as it did one hundred years ago. The Empire Mill and Excelsior Mill of George West are part of a park, and the former trolley railroad bed is scheduled to become a walking trail called Boice Park.
