= George West (American politician) =

American politician (1823–1901)

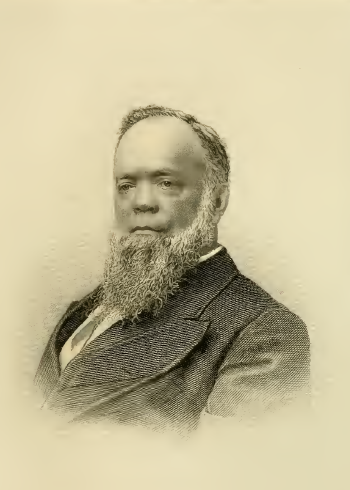

Member of the New York State Assembly for Saratoga County, 1st District
- In office January 1, 1872 – December 31, 1876
- Preceded by: Isaiah Fuller
- Succeeded by: George W. Neilson

Member of the U.S. House of Representatives from New York's 20th district
- In office March 4, 1881 – March 3, 1883
- Preceded by: John H. Starin
- Succeeded by: Edward Wemple
- In office March 4, 1885 – March 3, 1889
- Preceded by: Edward Wemple
- Succeeded by: John Sanford

Personal details
- Born: February 17, 1823 Bradninch, Devonshire, England, U.K.
- Died: September 20, 1901 (aged 78) Ballston Spa, New York, U.S.
- Resting place: Ballston Spa Village Cemetery, New York, United States
- Party: Republican
- Spouse: Louisa Rose
- Occupation: Industrialist

George West (February 17, 1823 – September 20, 1901) was an industrialist and a U.S. Representative from New York.

== Life ==
Born in Bradninch, Devonshire, England, West attended the common schools. West emigrated to the United States in February 1849 and settled at Ballston Spa, New York in 1860.

=== Business career ===
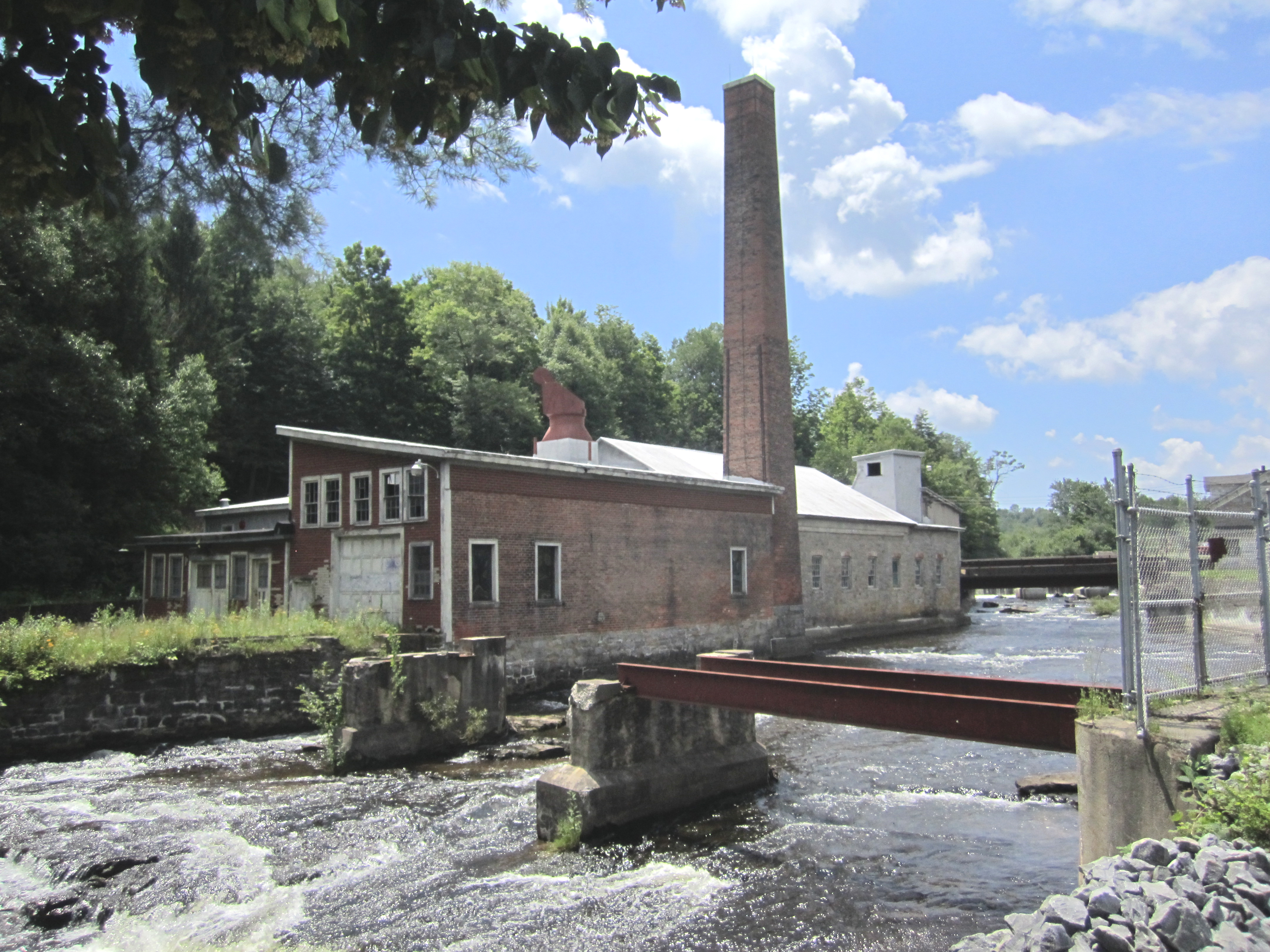
George West's "Empire Mill", Rock City Falls New York

In Ballston Spa West gradually acquired nine water-powered mills on Kayaderosseras Creek by 1879 manufacturing cotton, paper, and paper bags.

West was called "The Paper Bag King" because he was one of the first men in the country to manufacture paper bags at a time when most bags were made from cotton. In 1869, he and the few other bag manufacturers in the country joined with Francis Wolle, inventor of the first paper bag machine, to form the Union Paper Bag Machine Company. Its only purpose was to "buy and fight patents." This early trust was highly successful, as each member had access to all of the earliest paper bag patents and agreed not to compete with each other.

West manufactured bags from manila paper made of Manila hemp, also known as abacá from the Philippines. Thus, he was able to sell them at a much lower cost than cotton sacks. They became extremely popular, and he sold millions per week. His paper bag factory in Rock City Falls was one of the first in the country to manufacture bags with machinery.

The success of his bags compelled West to purchase or build additional paper mills. By 1880 his mills consisted of the Union, Union Bag, Island, Eagle, Pioneer, Glen (pulp), Empire, Excelsior, and Middle Grove Upper and Lower Mills, all situated on the Kayaderosseras Creek in Milton. He purchased his largest mill in the town of Hadley, New York on the Hudson River. West sold his paper mill empire to the Union Bag & Paper Company in 1899 for $1.5 million.

He also served as President of the First National Bank of Ballston Spa from 1879 until his death.

=== Political career ===
West served as member of the New York State Assembly (Saratoga Co., 1st Assembly District) in 1872, 1873, 1874, 1875 and 1876 and was a delegate to the 1880 Republican National Convention.

He was elected as a Republican to the Forty-seventh Congress, holding office from March 4, 1881, to March 3, 1883. He was defeated by Edward Wemple in 1882, but returned to the 49th and 50th United States Congresses, holding office from March 4, 1885, to March 3, 1889. Afterwards, he resumed his former business activities.

=== Personal ===
West married Louisa Rose (1822-1901) in England. The couple had six children, three of whom lived to adulthood. George (b.1845, Devonshire, England, d.1906, Ballston Spa, New York), Walter S. (1854-1875), and Florence L. (b.1856, Russell, Massachusetts, d.1934, Saratoga Springs, New York), who married D. W. Mabee.

He was known as a philanthropist, donating funds to build a museum in Round Lake, New York, a Methodist church in Ballston Spa, and making liberal contributions towards the two soldiers' monuments in Saratoga County, in Ballston Spa and Schuylerville.

In 1901 West died at his mansion in Ballston Spa with a fortune that would today be worth $75 million. His wife predeceased him by seven months. They are buried in the Ballston Spa Village Cemetery.

His original residence in Rock City Falls still stands on Route 29 as The Mansion Inn, now listed on the National Register of Historic Places.

== Sources ==
- United States Congress. "George West (id: W000302)". Biographical Directory of the United States Congress.
- Lost Industries of the Kaydeross Valley: A History of Manufacturing in Ballston Spa, New York; Timothy Starr, 2007

New York State Assembly
Preceded by Isaiah Fuller	New York State Assembly; Saratoga County, 1st District; 1872–1876	Succeeded by George W. Neilson
U.S. House of Representatives
Preceded by John H. Starin	Member of the U.S. House of Representatives from New York's 20th congressional district 1881–1883	Succeeded by Edward Wemple
Preceded by Edward Wemple	Member of the U.S. House of Representatives from New York's 20th congressional district 1885–1889	Succeeded by John Sanford
