= Milton, Saratoga County, New York =

Milton
- Town
- Town of Milton
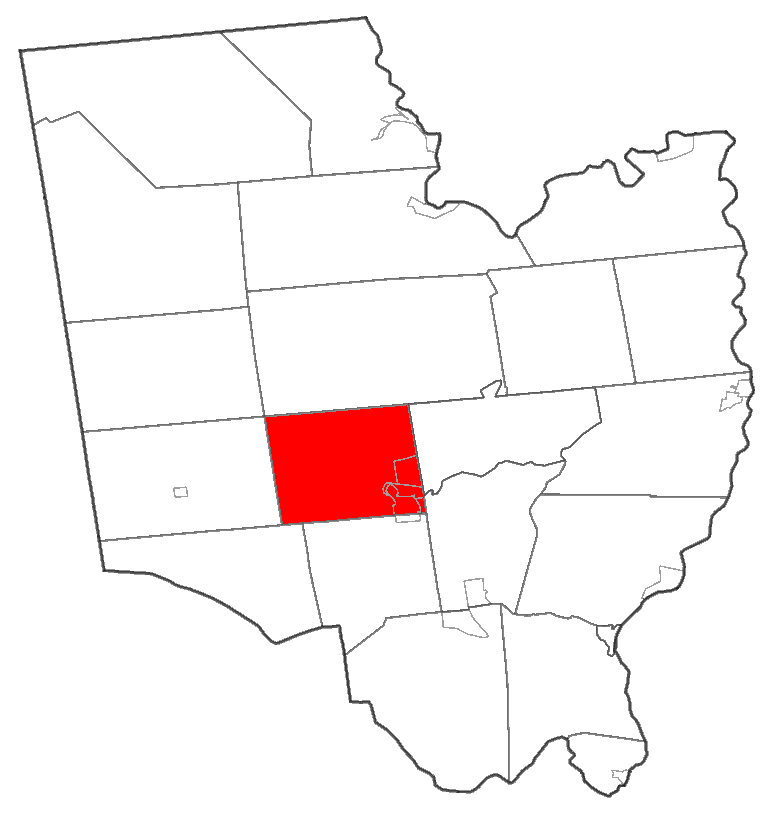
- Map highlighting Milton's location within Saratoga County.

- Location within New York Location within the United States
- Coordinates: 43°2′05″N 73°50′54″W
- Country: United States
- State: New York
- County: Saratoga
- Named for: John Milton

Area
  - Total: 35.75 sq mi (92.60 km^{2})
  - Land: 35.69 sq mi (92.44 km^{2})
  - Water: 0.066 sq mi (0.17 km^{2})

Population (2020)
  - Total: 18,800
  - Density: 527/sq mi (203/km^{2})
- Time zone: UTC+5 (Eastern EST))
  - Summer (DST): UTC+5 (EDT)
- ZIP code: 12020
- Area code: 518
- FIPS code: 36-091-47537
- GNIS feature ID: 2497690
- Website: www.miltonny.gov

Milton is a town in Saratoga County, New York, United States. The population was 18,800 at the 2020 census. Some believe that the town was named after the poet, John Milton, while other sources state that it is a shortening of "Mill-town" for the early mill activity.

Milton is an interior town in the central part of the county. It is southwest of Saratoga Springs.

== History ==
This region was part of the Kayaderossera patent of 1708. The town was first settled around 1772.

The town of Milton was established in 1792 from part of the town of Ballston. In 1793, part of the town was taken to form part of the town of Greenfield.

In 1807, part of Milton was lost when Ballston Spa became an incorporated village.

In the mid-to-late-19th century, the Town of Milton was the site of numerous manufacturing concerns. The most famous was the paper mills of "Paper Bag King" George West, who invented a line of square-bottomed paper bags and sold them by the millions soon after the American Civil War. There were also the celebrated hard edge tool factories of Isaiah Blood, the large planing, sash, and door mill of Benjamin Barber, the National Folding Box paper mill, and the Cottrell Paper Mill, the only manufacturer that still operates today. All of these mills were water-powered, and therefore succumbed to competition from electric-powered factories in the early 20th century.

Milton had its very own terminal trolley railroad line early in the 20th century. Called the Ballston Terminal Railroad, it spanned 12 miles (19 km) from Ballston Spa to Rock City Falls and Middle Grove. It was one of the few trolley railroads in the country to serve primarily industry rather than carry passengers. The trolley operated from 1898 to 1929.

The Kesselring Site for Naval Nuclear Propulsion Program was established in 1948 in West Milton.

As of 2022, Milton was home to the most manufactured home parks in the county.

== Geography ==
According to the United States Census Bureau, the town has a total area of 35.6 square miles (92.3 km^{2}), of which 35.6 square miles (92.2 km^{2}) is land and 0.04 square mile (0.1 km^{2}) (0.06%) is water.

Kayaderosseras Creek flows through the eastern part of Milton.

New York State Route 29 is an east–west highway across the northern part of Milton. New York State Route 67 runs along the southern town line, and State Route 50 crosses the southern corner of the town, through Ballston Spa and North Ballston Spa.

== Demographics ==
Historical population
Census	Pop.	Note	%±
1820	2,795		—
1830	3,079		10.2%
1840	3,166		2.8%
1850	4,220		33.3%
1860	5,254		24.5%
1870	4,946		−5.9%
1880	5,565		12.5%
1890	5,820		4.6%
1900	5,926		1.8%
1910	5,724		−3.4%
1920	5,294		−7.5%
1930	5,672		7.1%
1940	5,768		1.7%
1950	6,294		9.1%
1960	7,114		13.0%
1970	10,450		46.9%
1980	12,876		23.2%
1990	14,658		13.8%
2000	17,103		16.7%
2010	18,575		8.6%
2020	18,800		1.2%
U.S. Decennial Census

As of the census of 2000, there were 17,103 people, 6,401 households, and 4,544 families residing in the town. The population density was 480.5 inhabitants per square mile (185.5/km^{2}). There were 6,701 housing units at an average density of 188.2 per square mile (72.7/km^{2}). The racial makeup of the town was 96.43% White, 1.02% Black or African American, 0.25% Native American, 0.47% Asian, 0.02% Pacific Islander, 0.42% from other races, and 1.39% from two or more races. Hispanic or Latino of any race were 1.75% of the population.

There were 6,401 households, out of which 38.2% had children under the age of 18 living with them, 56.4% were married couples living together, 10.4% had a female householder with no husband present, and 29.0% were non-families. 21.7% of all households were made up of individuals, and 6.7% had someone living alone who was 65 years of age or older. The average household size was 2.64 and the average family size was 3.08.

In the town, the population was spread out, with 27.7% under the age of 18, 7.9% from 18 to 24, 35.2% from 25 to 44, 20.8% from 45 to 64, and 8.4% who were 65 years of age or older. The median age was 34 years. For every 100 females, there were 100.2 males. For every 100 females age 18 and over, there were 99.2 males.

The median income for a household in the town was $45,262, and the median income for a family was $51,771. Males had a median income of $36,863 versus $27,335 for females. The per capita income for the town was $20,443. About 4.7% of families and 6.7% of the population were below the poverty line, including 8.7% of those under age 18 and 4.4% of those age 65 or over.

== Communities and locations in the town of Milton ==
- Ballston Spa – The northern section of the county seat, the village of Ballston Spa, is in the southeastern part of Milton.
- Bloodville – A former location near Ballston Spa and the site of American Axe & Tool Company.
- Factory Village – A hamlet and suburb northwest of Ballston Spa on County Road 45. The name is derived from two paper mills.
- Frink Corners – A location in the northwestern part of the town at the town line.
- Kesselring Site – A research facility in the western part of Milton.
- Milton Center – A hamlet northwest of Ballston Spa at the junction of County Roads 43 and 49. It is part of the Milton census-designated place.
- North Ballston Spa – A community at the northern border of Ballston Spa.
- North Milton – A hamlet east of Rock City Falls on NY-29 at County Road 59.
- Rock City Falls – A hamlet in the northwestern part of the town on NY-29 at the junction of County Road 49.
- Saratoga County Airport (5B2) – An airport north of Ballston Spa.
- West Milton – A hamlet near the western town line on County Road 49. It was formerly called "Spiers Corners" and "Clutes Corners."
