= Milton (CDP), Saratoga County, New York =

Milton
- CDP
- Location within the state of New York
- Coordinates: 43°2′5″N 73°50′54″W
- Country: United States
- State: New York
- County: Saratoga

Area
  - Total: 1.5 sq mi (3.8 km^{2})
  - Land: 1.5 sq mi (3.8 km^{2})

Population (2000)
  - Total: 2,692
  - Density: 1,800/sq mi (710/km^{2})
- Time zone: UTC-5 (Eastern (EST))
  - Summer (DST): UTC-4 (EDT)

Milton is a census-designated place (CDP) in the town of Milton in Saratoga County, New York, United States. The population was 2,692 at the 2000 census.

== Geography ==
Milton is located at 43°2′5″N 73°50′54″W (43.03473, -73.848405).

According to the United States Census Bureau, the CDP has a total area of 1.5 square miles (3.8 km^{2}), of which 1.5 square miles (3.8 km^{2}) is land and 0.68% is water.

== Demographics ==
As of the census of 2000, there were 2,692 people, 983 households, and 751 families residing in the CDP. The population density was 1,831.7 inhabitants per square mile (707.2/km^{2}). There were 1,000 housing units at an average density of 680.4 per square mile (262.7/km^{2}). The racial makeup of the CDP was 97.44% White, 0.74% Black or African American, 0.15% Native American, 0.33% Asian, 0.30% from other races, and 1.04% from two or more races. Hispanic or Latino of any race were 1.82% of the population.

There were 983 households, out of which 40.4% had children under the age of 18 living with them, 66.0% were married couples living together, 7.4% had a female householder with no husband present, and 23.6% were non-families. 17.4% of all households were made up of individuals, and 6.2% had someone living alone who was 65 years of age or older. The average household size was 2.73 and the average family size was 3.10.

In the CDP, the population was spread out, with 27.6% under the age of 18, 5.2% from 18 to 24, 37.5% from 25 to 44, 20.9% from 45 to 64, and 8.7% who were 65 years of age or older. The median age was 35 years. For every 100 females, there were 95.9 males. For every 100 females age 18 and over, there were 93.4 males.

The median income for a household in the CDP was $56,304, and the median income for a family was $61,069. Males had a median income of $39,500 versus $27,292 for females. The per capita income for the CDP was $23,485. None of the families and 0.3% of the population were living below the poverty line, including no under eighteens and none of those over 64.

The town sends students to Saratoga Springs City School District and Ballston Spa Central School District.
