= Kayaderosseras =

Kayaderosseras Creek
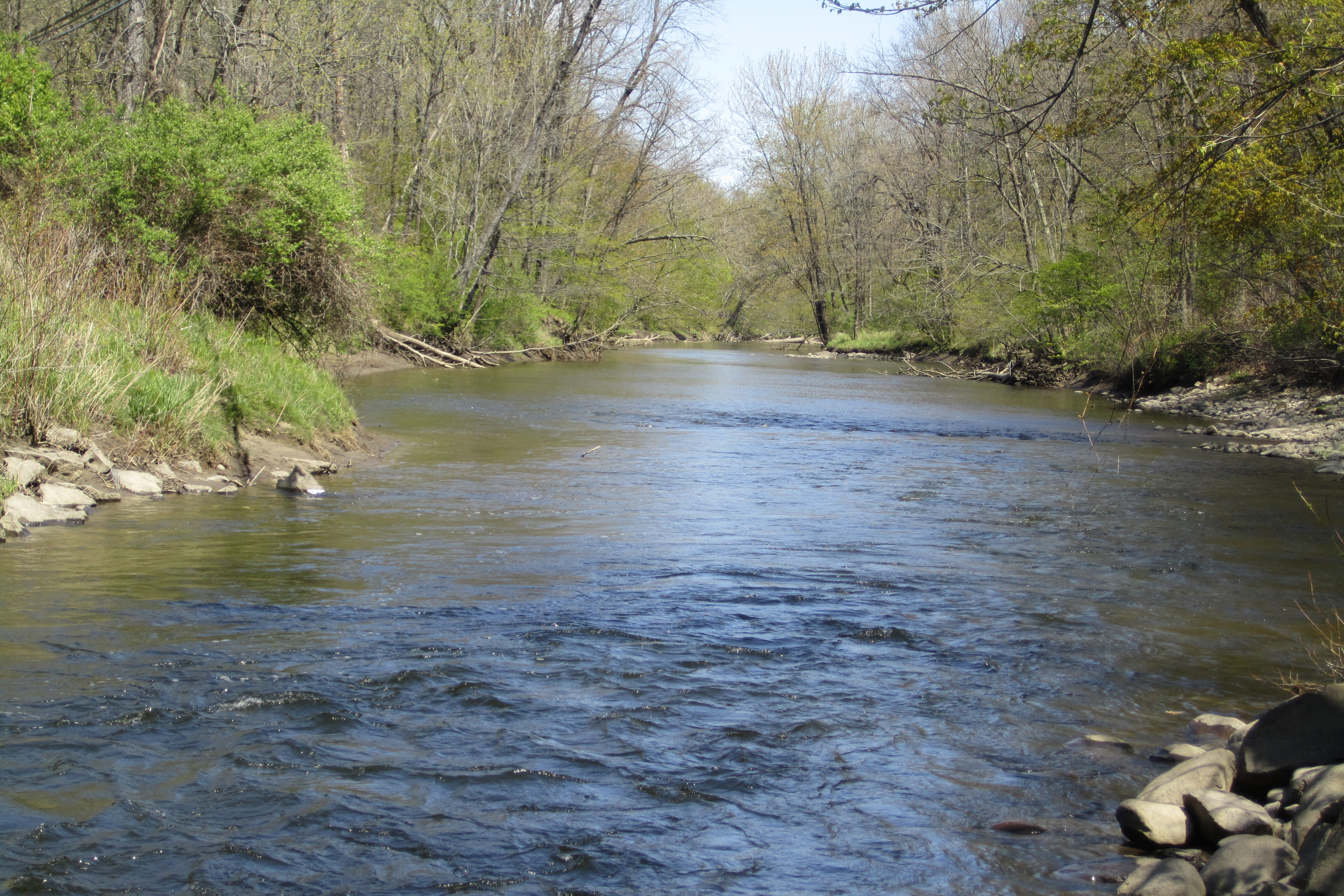
- Kayaderosseras Creek looking downstream from US Route 9, April 2012

Location
- Country: United States
- State: New York
- Region: Upstate New York
- Metropolitan area: Capital District
- Counties: Saratoga County

Physical characteristics
- Source
  - location: Corinth, Saratoga County, New York
  - coordinates: 43°12′00″N 73°55′17″W
  - elevation: 1,400 ft (430 m)
- Mouth: Saratoga Lake
  - location: Saratoga Springs/Malta, Saratoga County, New York
  - coordinates: 43°02′27″N 73°44′14″W
  - elevation: 200 ft (61 m)
- Basin size: 195 mi^{2} (510 km^{2})

Basin features
- River system: Hudson River Watershed
- Tributaries
  - left: Mud Creek, Vly Creek, Star Brook, Geyser Brook, Bog Meadow Brook
  - right: South Branch Kayaderosseras, Crook Brook, Glowgee Creek, Gordon Creek, Mourning Kill

The Kayaderosseras Creek, usually shortened to Kaydeross, is the largest river that lies completely within Saratoga County, New York State. It originates in the Kayaderosseras Range in the northern part of the county, passes through the towns of Corinth, Greenfield, and Milton, and serves as the boundary between the City of Saratoga Springs and the Town of Malta before emptying into Saratoga Lake.

== History ==
The Mohawk tribe of the Iroquois Five Nations used the associated valley as a summer hunting and fishing destination. The colony of New York purchased the Kayaderosseras territory from the Mohawk in 1704. In the license to purchase the name Kayaderosseras is described as an "Indian name" However, others claim that the word is "evidently a corruption by mispronunciation of two French terms: pays arrosé, a watered country, or pays des ruisseaux, a country of streams.

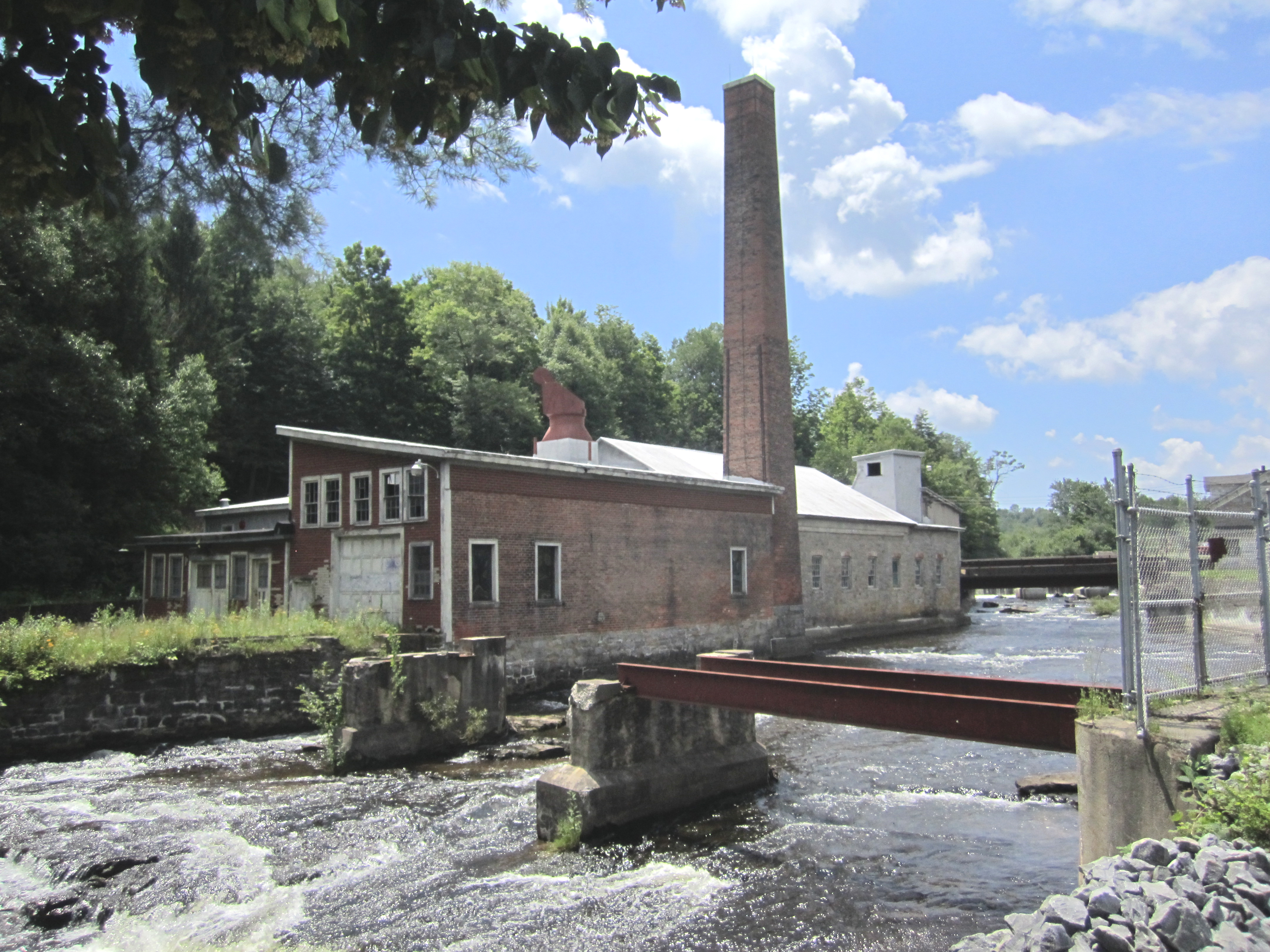
George West's "Empire Mill" along the creek at Rock City Falls

The creek is best known for providing water power to a host of paper mills and a hard edge-tool factory in the 19th century. "Paper Bag King" George West established his paper bag empire on the banks of the Kayaderosseras Creek in Rock City Falls in 1862. Of the dozen paper mills situated along the creek in the late 19th century, only the Cottrell Paper Company is still in operation as of 2024.

From 1898 to 1929, the 12-mile (19 km) Kaydeross Railroad, or Ballston Terminal Railroad, a trolley railroad line, closely followed the banks of the creek to serve the paper mills and Isaiah Blood's tool factory. Although this line also carried passengers, it mainly existed to carry freight.

Over-logging caused the flow of the creek to decrease dramatically in the late 19th and early 20th centuries. Today the creek possesses several popular fishing spots, especially in Rock City Falls, Milton Center, and Craneville. The principal fish is the brown trout, which is stocked.

== Gallery ==
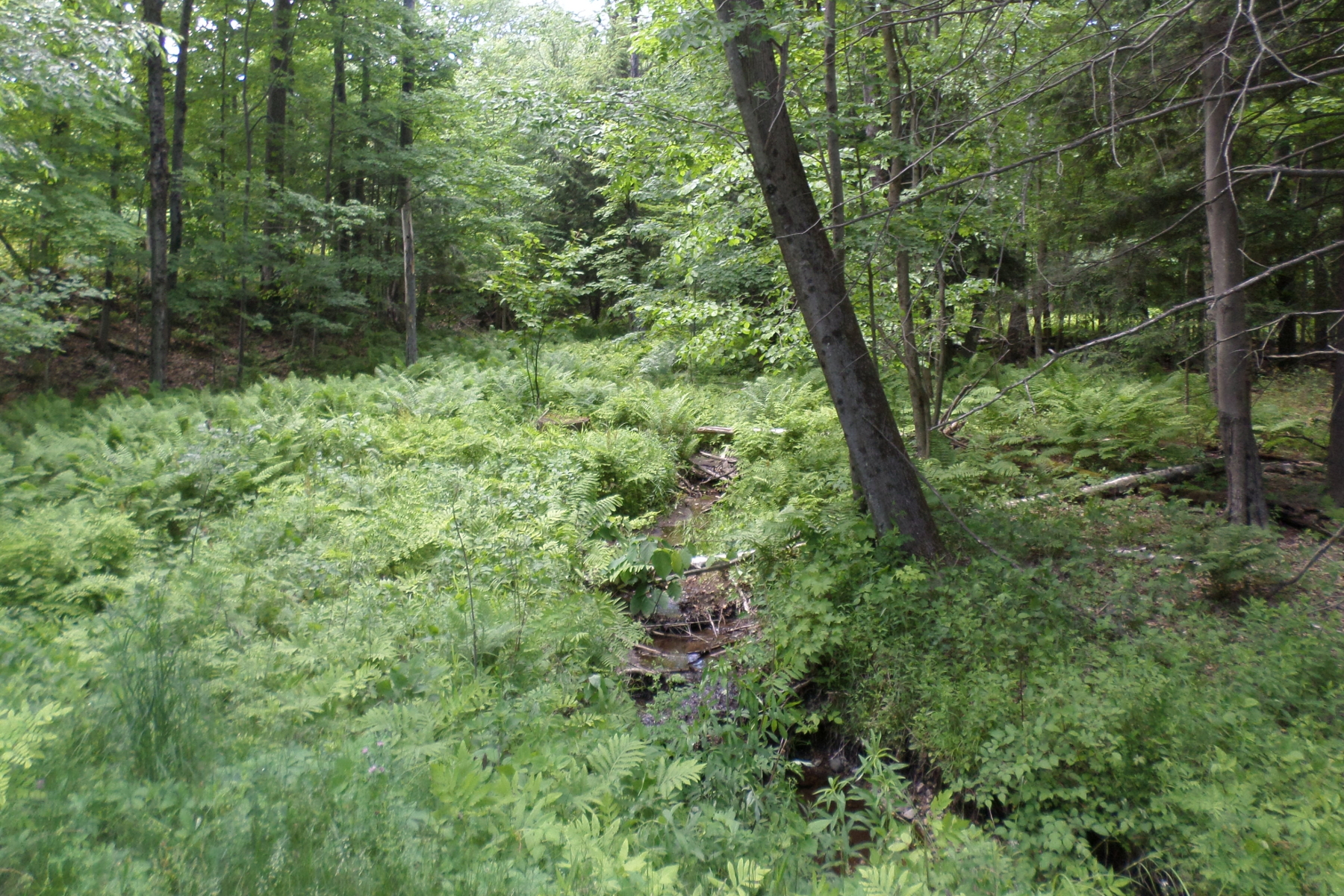
Kayaderosseras Creek crossing Miner Road in Corinth NY, near its source

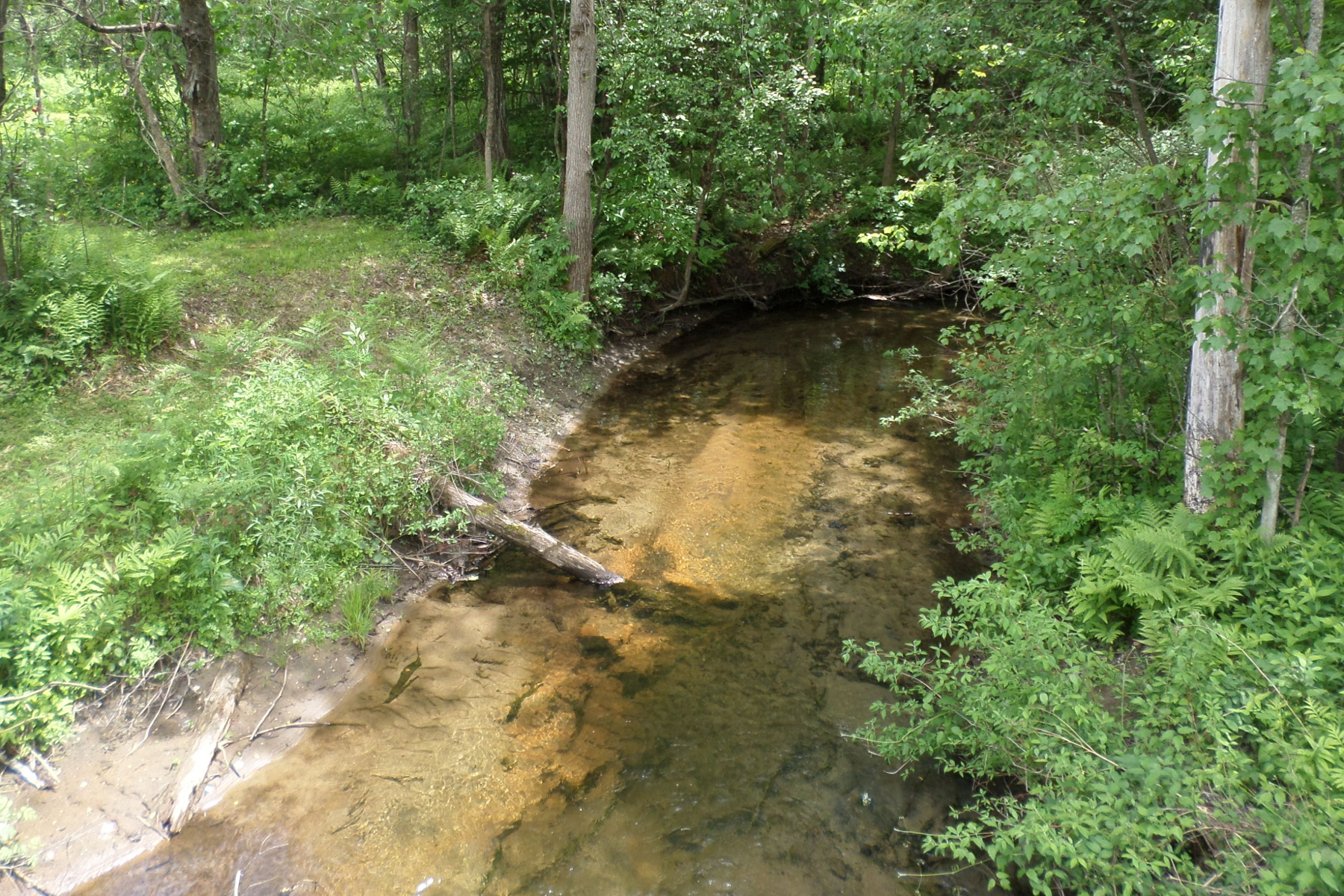
Kayaderosseras Creek crossing Depot Rd Road in Corinth NY

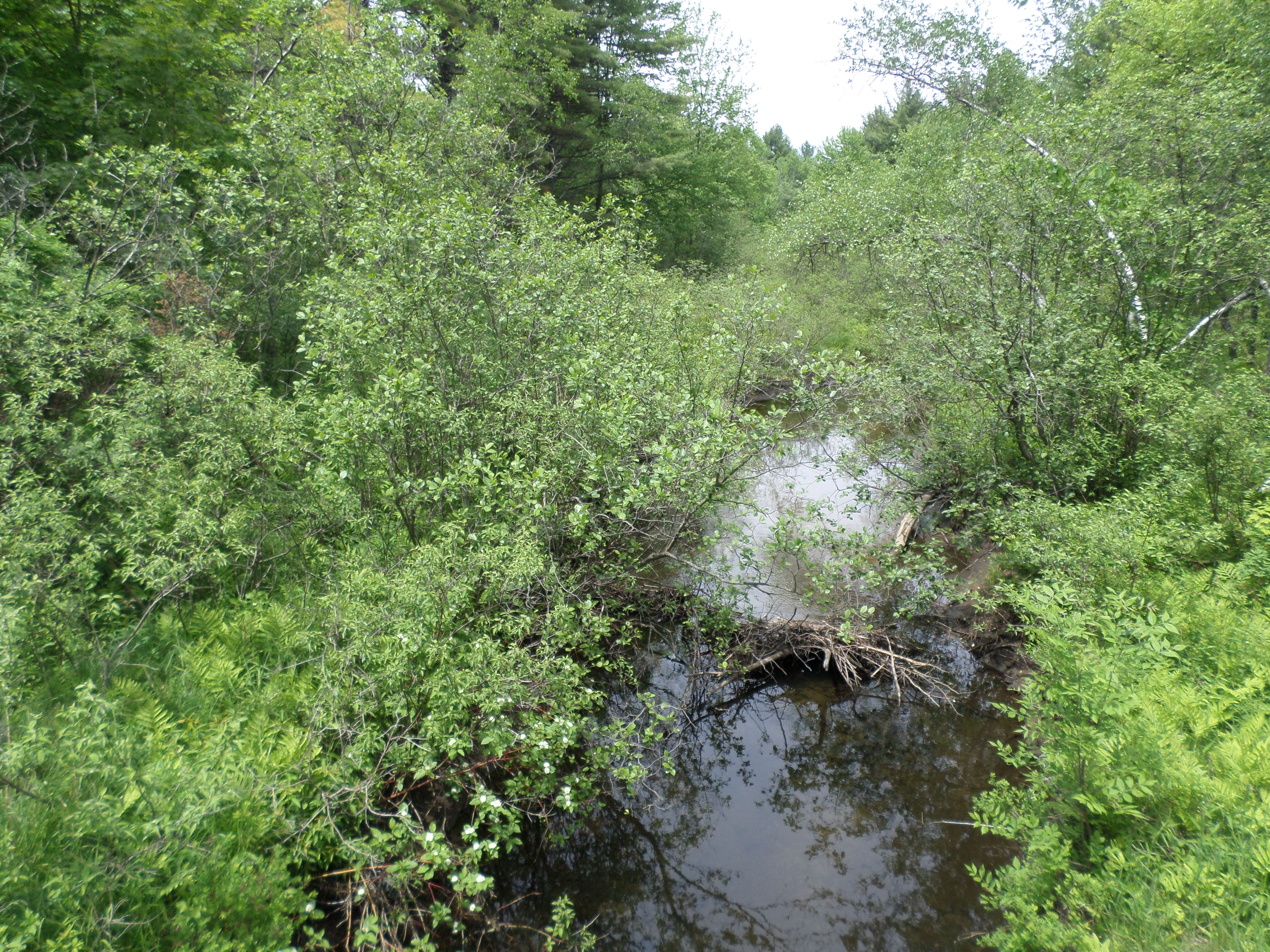
Kayaderosseras Creek Crossing Spier Falls Road in Greenfield NY

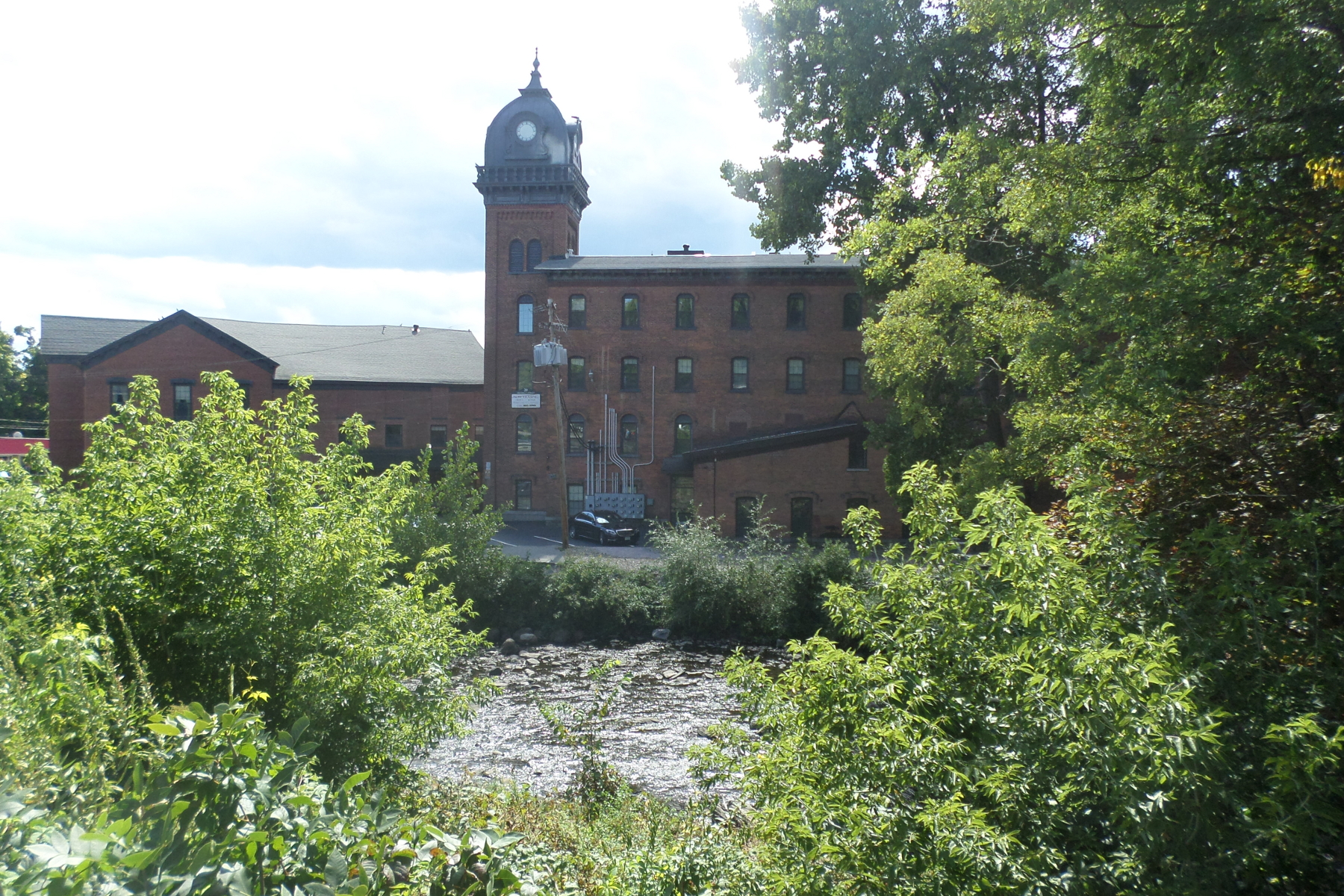
Kayaderosseras Creek at the former Union Mill complex in Ballston Spa, NY

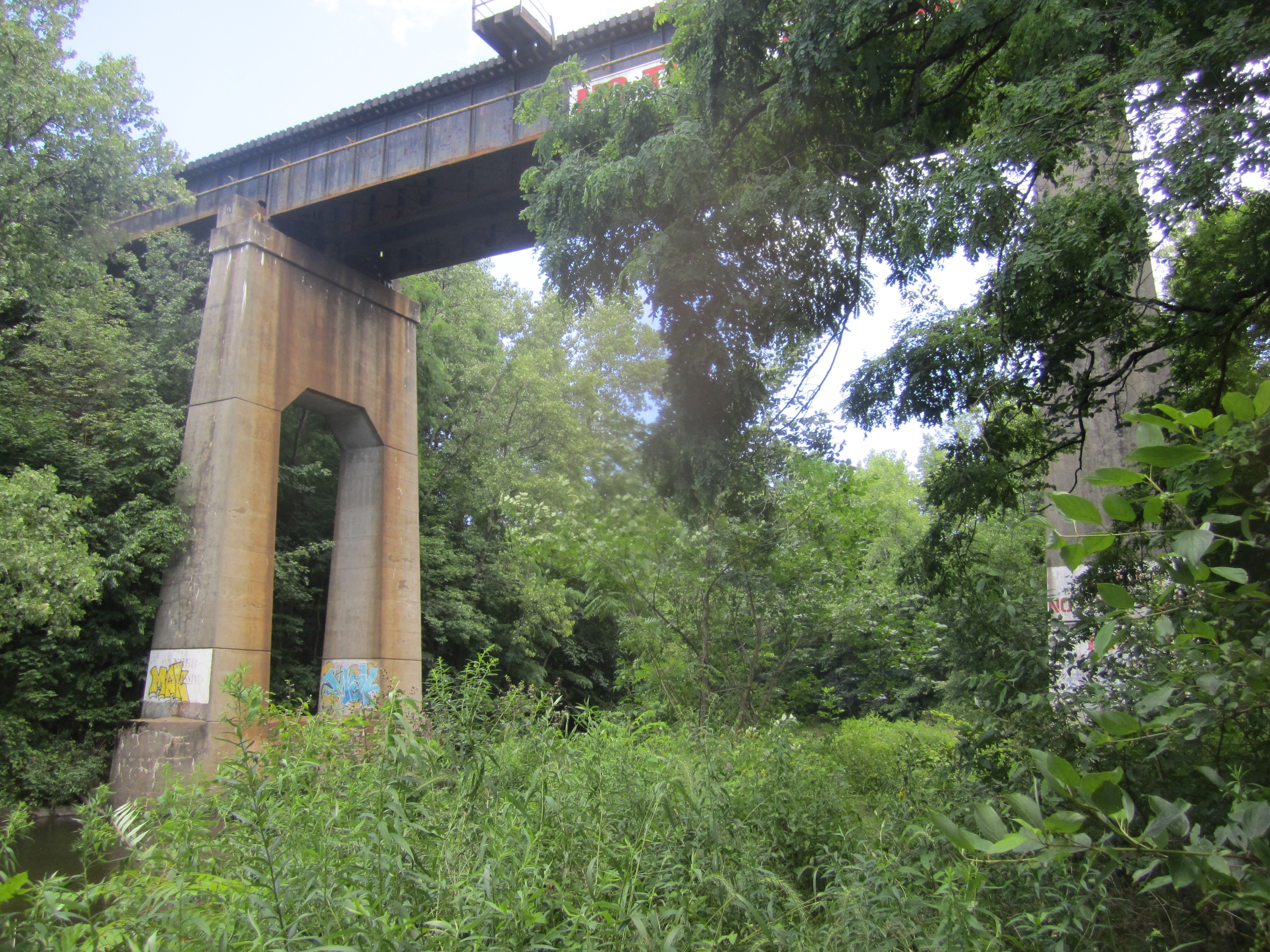
Kayaderosseras Creek below Ballston Spa crossed by railroad trestle

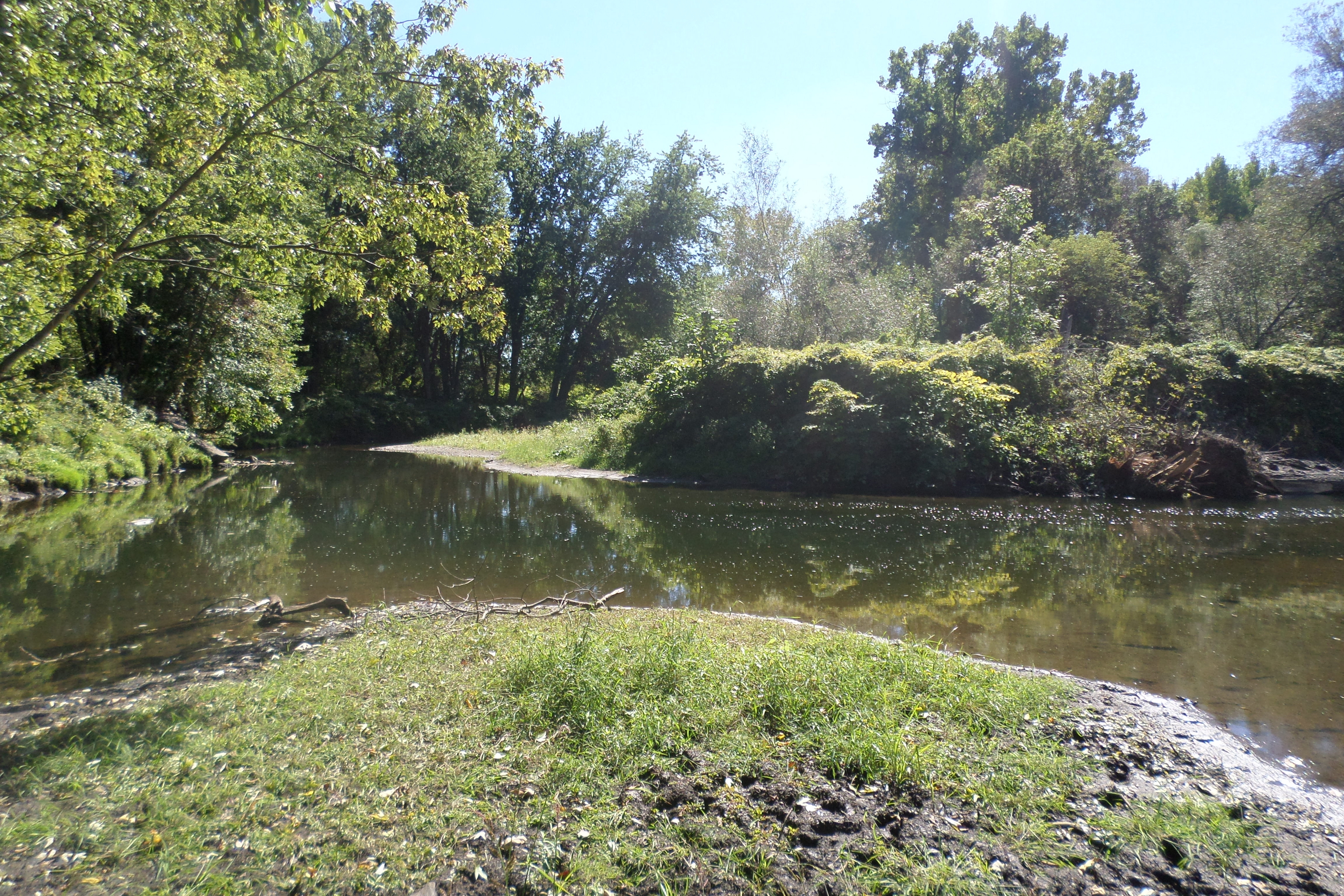
Confluence of the Mourning Kill with the Kayaderosseras Creek in Malta, NY

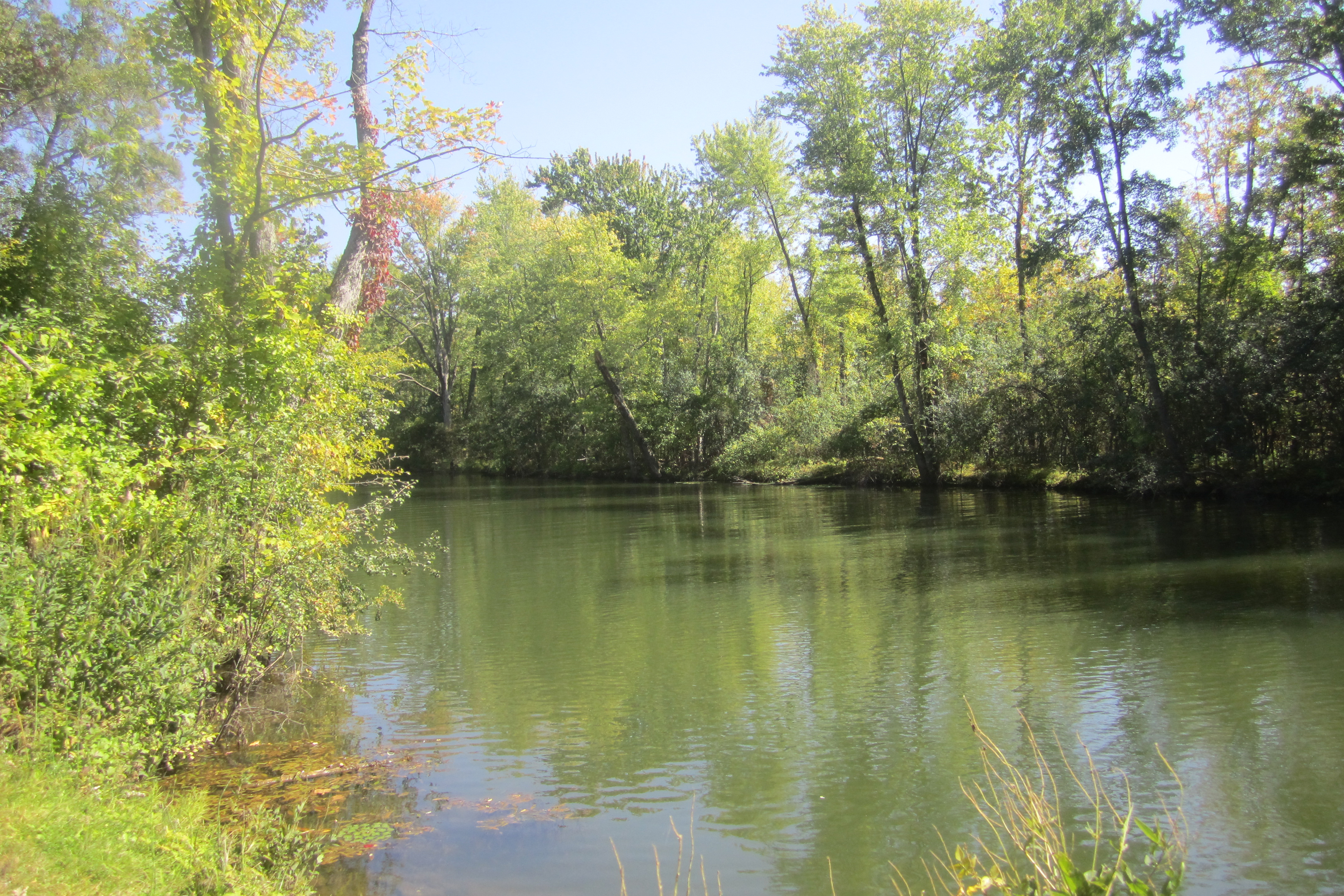
Kayaderosseras Creek near its mouth

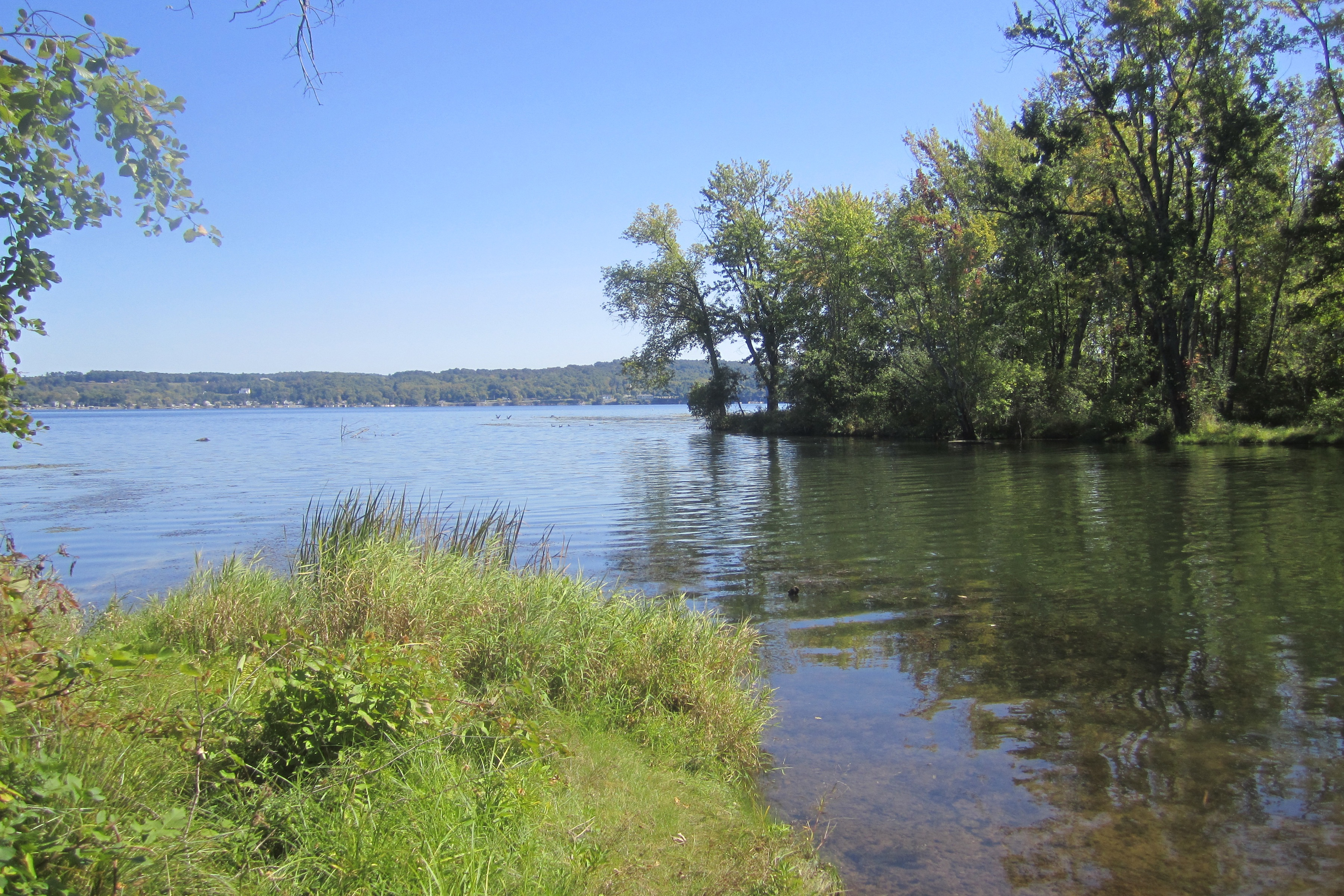
Mouth of Kayaderosseras Creek at Saratoga Lake
