= Greenfield, New York =

Greenfield
- Town
- Town of Greenfield
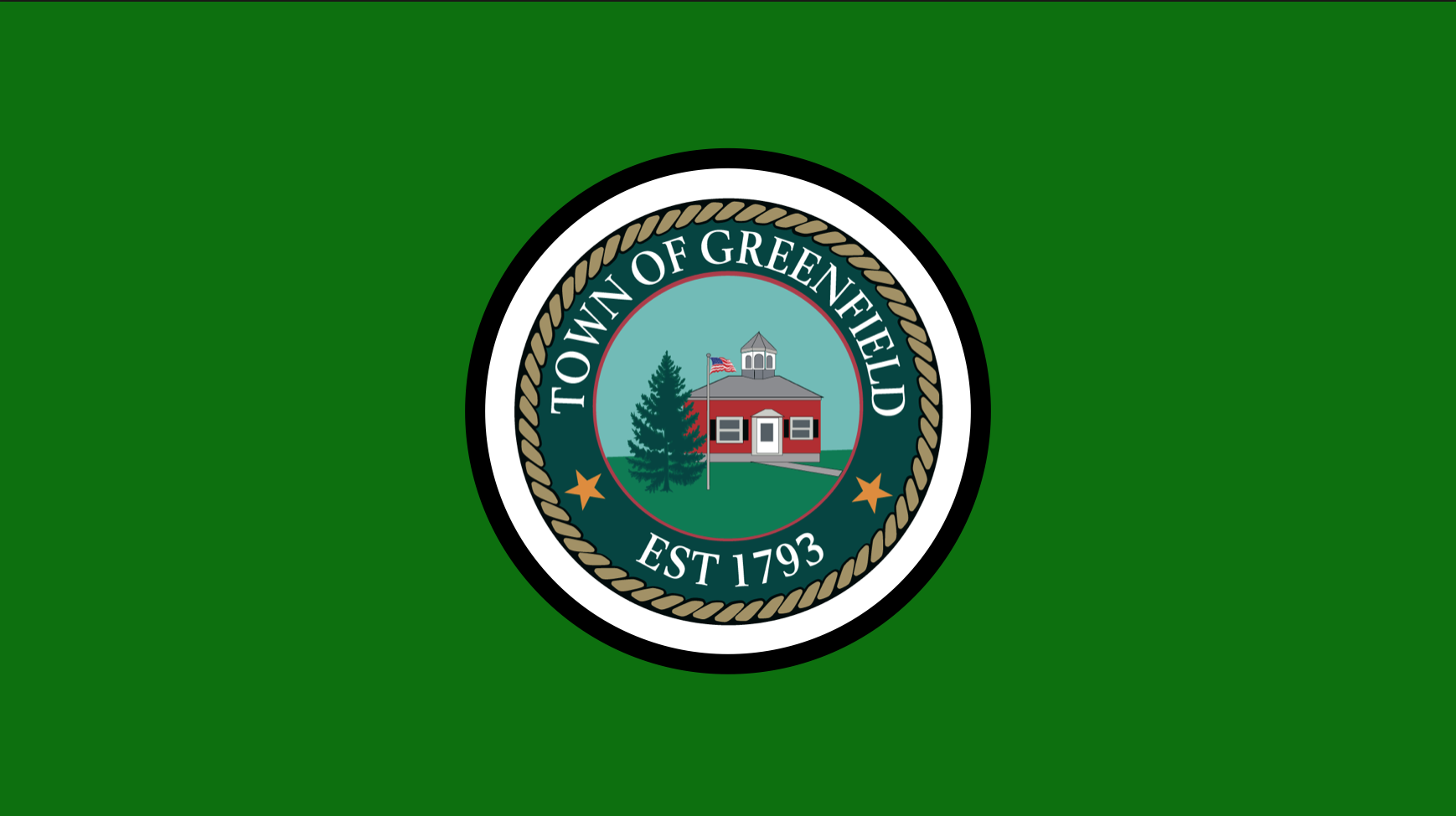
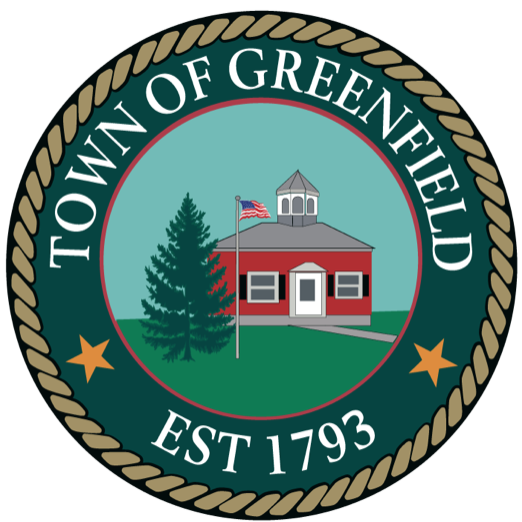
- Flag Seal

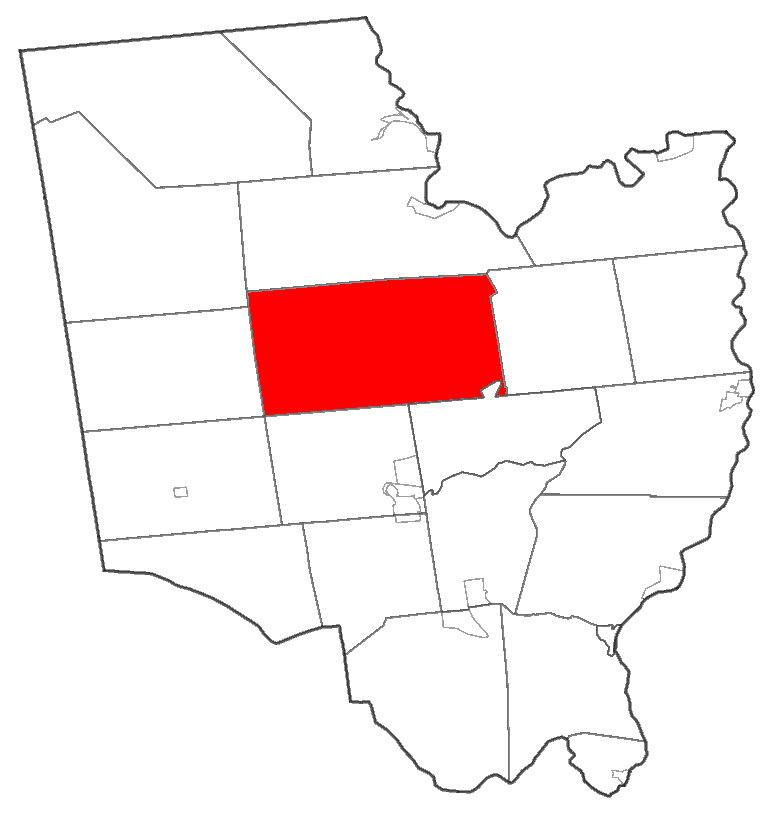
- Map highlighting Greenfield's location within Saratoga County.

- Location within the state of New York
- Coordinates: 43°7′20″N 73°52′18″W
- Country: United States
- State: New York
- County: Saratoga
- Named for: Greenfield, New Hampshire

Area
  - Total: 67.69 sq mi (175.31 km^{2})
  - Land: 67.39 sq mi (174.54 km^{2})
  - Water: 0.30 sq mi (0.77 km^{2})
- Elevation: 590 ft (180 m)

Population (2020)
  - Total: 8,004
  - Density: 118.8/sq mi (45.86/km^{2})
- Time zone: UTC-5 (Eastern (EST))
  - Summer (DST): UTC-4 (EDT)
- ZIP code: 12833
- Area code: 518
- FIPS code: 36-30444
- GNIS feature ID: 0979019
- Website: Town website

Greenfield is a town in Saratoga County, New York, United States. It is located northwest of Saratoga Springs, and is the largest by area in the county. Students living in Greenfield attend schools of the Saratoga Springs City School District. The Palmertown, and Kayaderosseras Ranges pass through the town, the town is located at the foothills of the Adirondack Mountains.

== Etymology ==
The town is named after Greenfield, New Hampshire.

== History ==
The area was first settled circa 1786, and in 1793, the town was formed from parts of the Milton and Saratoga. Its land area was reduced in 1794 by contributions of some of its territory to the newly formed towns of Day, Corinth, and Hadley.

== Geography ==
Greenfield is the largest town in the county by area. According to the United States Census Bureau, the town has a total area of 67.7 square miles (175 km^{2}), of which 67.4 square miles (175 km^{2}) is land and 0.3 square miles (0.78 km^{2}) (0.46%) is water.

Route 9N, a north–south highway, passes through the eastern part of the town.

== Demographics ==
Historical population
Census	Pop.	Note	%±
1800	3,073		—
1810	3,087		0.5%
1820	3,024		−2.0%
1830	3,151		4.2%
1840	2,803		−11.0%
1850	2,890		3.1%
1860	2,970		2.8%
1870	2,698		−9.2%
1880	2,448		−9.3%
1890	2,169		−11.4%
1900	1,837		−15.3%
1910	1,552		−15.5%
1920	1,481		−4.6%
1930	1,544		4.3%
1940	1,698		10.0%
1950	1,961		15.5%
1960	2,548		29.9%
1970	4,378		71.8%
1980	5,104		16.6%
1990	6,338		24.2%
2000	7,362		16.2%
2010	7,775		5.6%
2020	8,004		2.9%
U.S. Decennial Census

As of the census of 2000, there were 7,362 people, 2,761 households, and 2,007 families residing in the town. The population density was 109.2 inhabitants per square mile (42.2/km^{2}). There were 3,222 housing units at an average density of 47.8 per square mile (18.5/km^{2}). The racial makeup of the town was 97.45% White, 0.65% African American, 0.14% Native American, 0.34% Asian, 0.22% from other races, and 1.21% from two or more races. Hispanic or Latino of any race were 1.13% of the population.

There were 2,761 households, out of which 38.1% had children under the age of 18 living with them, 58.2% were married couples living together, 9.5% had a female householder with no husband present, and 27.3% were non-families. 20.4% of all households were made up of individuals, and 7.4% had someone living alone who was 65 years of age or older. The average household size was 2.66 and the average family size was 3.05.

In the town, the population was spread out, with 27.2% under the age of 18, 7.3% from 18 to 24, 32.4% from 25 to 44, 23.6% from 45 to 64, and 9.5% who were 65 years of age or older. The median age was 36 years. For every 100 females, there were 100.3 males. For every 100 females age 18 and over, there were 98.4 males.

The median income for a household in the town was $44,784, and the median income for a family was $48,299. Males had a median income of $35,112 versus $27,127 for females. The per capita income for the town was $20,014. About 4.3% of families and 6.1% of the population were below the poverty line, including 8.5% of those under age 18 and 3.4% of those aged 65 or over.

== Communities and locations in Greenfield ==
- Ballou Corner – A location located on Ormsbee Road, home to Ballou Cemetery.
- Chatfield Corner – A hamlet in the southwestern part of the town on County Road 12.
- Frink Corner – A location on the southern town line, southwest of Middle Grove.
- Granite Lake – A community located on Braim Road.
- Greenfield – A hamlet in the southern part of the town on County Road 19.
- Greenfield Center – A hamlet on NY-9N at the junction of County Road 36.
- Kings – A hamlet south of North Greenfield on NY-9N.
- Lake Desolation – (1) A hamlet in the northwestern corner of the town on County Road 12 by (2) a lake, also known as Lake Desolation. The lake itself is slightly a part of Providence, New York, although it is mainly within Greenfield. It is also listed at that page under communities.
- Middle Grove – A hamlet in the southwestern part of the town. It was earlier known as "Jamesville."
- Mt. Pleasant – A location in the northwest corner of the town, north of Lake Desolation. It was once the most populous settlement in the town, but is now abandoned.
- North Greenfield – A hamlet on NY-9N, north of Greenfield Center.
- Pages Corners – A hamlet by the southern town line between Middle Grove and South Greenfield on County Road 21.
- Porter Corners (43°08′54″N 73°53′11″W) – A hamlet southwest of North Greenfield on County Road 19. First settled in 1787. Early settlers include James Vail and Benjamin Clinch. Asahel Porter, whom the hamlet was named for, settled a few years after 1796 in Porter Corners after removing from St. John’s Corners. Born in Massachusetts in 1768, Porter came to Greenfield in 1793 or 1794, and was a successful businessman. At one point he was sheriff, as well as a member of the State Assembly. At times throughout its history the hamlet has been home to a hotel, store, bank, two churches, a jail, a saw mill, grist mills, and a carriage shop. It was once known as Porter's Corners. Today, the hamlet contains a Methodist church, post office, convenience store, fire department, town park, a trailer park, and single family homes. The current store building dating from the late 1800s is locally known as “Mom and Pop’s” due to a business of the same name operating there until recently for many decades.
- Sky Ranch – A location on Plank Road, it is located at a higher elevation than most of the town.
- South Greenfield – A location south of Greenfield village.

== Notable people ==
- William Aldrich, (1820–1885), born in Greenfield Center, United States Congressman from Illinois
- Elihu Anthony (1818-1905), California pioneer
- William Brayton (1787–1828), Justice of the Vermont Supreme Court, resided in Greenfield before attending college and moving to Vermont.
- Blackleach Burritt (1744–1794), noted clergyman in the American Revolution.
- Harry Carman (1884–1964), dean of Columbia College
- Sanford Robinson Gifford, (1823–1880) Hudson River School artist of some acclaim.
