= West Milton, New York =

West Milton
- hamlet
- Location within the state of New York
- Coordinates: 43°02′15″N 73°55′45″W
- Country: United States
- State: New York
- County: Saratoga
- Time zone: UTC-5 (Eastern (EST))
  - Summer (DST): UTC-5 (EDT)

West Milton is a hamlet in Ballston Spa, New York, United States at an elevation of 440 feet (134 m). Nearby lies the Knolls Atomic Power Laboratory's Kenneth A. Kesselring Site, which tests naval nuclear reactor designs. The facility includes a notable large sphere dome constructed in 1953 to contain any possible radiation leaks from the work done within.
