= Isaiah Blood =

American politician (1810–1870)

Isaiah Blood (February 13, 1810 in Ballston, Saratoga County, New York – November 29, 1870) was an American farmer, manufacturer and politician from New York.

== Life ==
Isaiah was the son of Sylvester Blood, a farmer and scythe maker who enlarged his business by purchasing land next to the Kayaderosseras Creek in an area known as "The Hollow," now Bloodville, New York.

In 1831, Isaiah married Jane E. Gates of Ballston Spa and was given the choice of taking over the scythe shop or a retail store of which Sylvester was part owner. Isaiah chose the scythe shop and moved to The Hollow with his wife. Six years later he took over the business and began increasing production.

In 1851, Blood joined up with two other businessmen and built an axe factory a short distance downstream, and within a year became the sole owner. A fire burned down the enterprise, but Blood persevered and built a new factory even larger than the one that was lost. The Scythe Works also burned down in the 1850s and were rebuilt on a larger scale.

His organizational skills and ambition were applied in greatly expanding the production of both scythes and axes through the careful development of quality control processes. His tools became well known throughout the Western Hemisphere, and lumbermen were proud to have the name "I. Blood" stamped on their axes. In the American Civil War, Blood manufactured an order of battle-axes for a Massachusetts artillery company in the Union Army measuring two feet long (resembling a short, slightly curved sword).

His political inclinations were Democratic. He was a member of the New York State Assembly (Saratoga Co., 1st D.) in 1852; and of the New York State Senate (15th D.) in 1860 and 1861. Governor Morgan appointed him a member of the war committee of Saratoga County to enlist recruits for the army during the Civil War. He was again a member of the State Senate in 1870, but died of typhoid fever on November 29. At the time of his death, he was also Supervisor of the Town of Milton, New York, a position he had held twice before, in 1847 and 1859. He is buried in Ballston Spa Village Cemetery.

== Legacy ==
His son-in-law Henry Knickerbacker assumed ownership of the works and operated it for 20 more years. In 1892 the business was sold to the American Axe & Tool Company. In 1901 both the axe and scythe works were destroyed in separate fires and not rebuilt. The hamlet of Bloodville, New York still bears his name today.

== Sources ==
- Lost Industries of the Kaydeross Valley: A History of Manufacturing in Ballston Spa, New York (2007)
- Isaiah Blood: Scythe and Axe Maker of Ballston Spa, New York by Timothy Starr (2010)
- Invented in Ballston Spa (2008)
- The Story of the Bloods by Richard Deane Harris

New York State Assembly
Preceded by Abraham Leggett	New York State Assembly; Saratoga County, 1st District; 1852	Succeeded by William Cary
New York State Senate
Preceded by George G. Scott	New York State Senate; 15th District; 1860–1861	Succeeded by John Willard
Preceded by Charles Stanford	New York State Senate; 15th District; 1870	Succeeded by Webster Wagner
