= Bibliography of Millard Fillmore =

Millard Fillmore
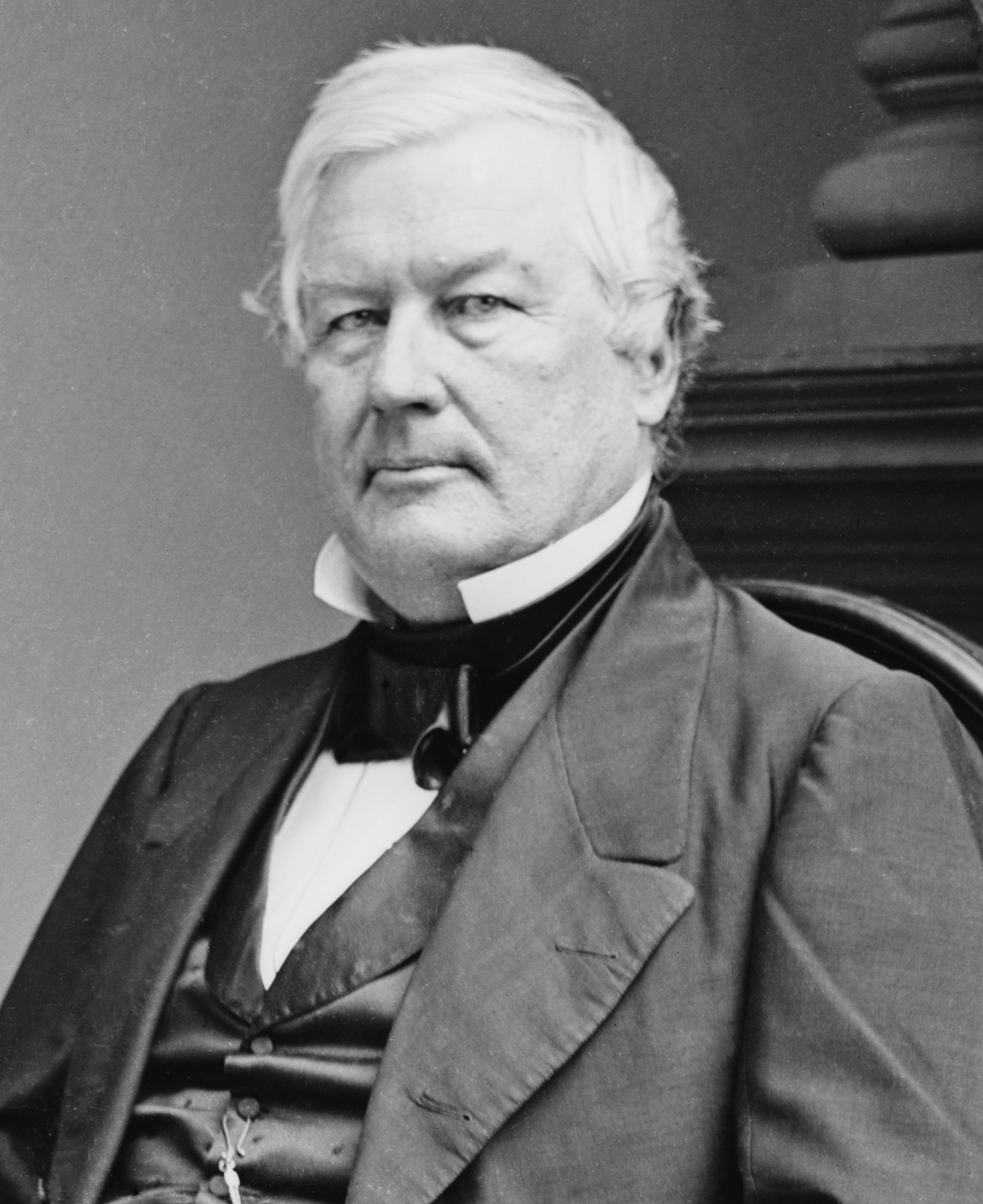
- Portrait c. 1855–1865

13th President of the United States
- In office July 9, 1850 – March 4, 1853
- Vice President: Vacant (Note: Fillmore was Vice President under President Zachary Taylor and became President upon Taylor's death on July 9, 1850. Prior to adoption of the Twenty-fifth Amendment (1967) a vacancy in the office of vice president was not filled until the next ensuing election and inauguration.)
- Preceded by: Zachary Taylor
- Succeeded by: Franklin Pierce

12th Vice President of the United States
- In office March 4, 1849 – July 9, 1850
- President: Zachary Taylor
- Preceded by: George M. Dallas
- Succeeded by: William R. King

14th Comptroller of New York
- In office January 1, 1848 – February 20, 1849
- Governor: John Young; Hamilton Fish
- Preceded by: Azariah C. Flagg
- Succeeded by: Washington Hunt

Chairman of the House Ways and Means Committee
- In office March 4, 1841 – March 3, 1843
- Preceded by: John Winston Jones
- Succeeded by: James I. McKay

Member of the U.S. House of Representatives from New York's 32nd district
- In office March 4, 1837 – March 3, 1843
- Preceded by: Thomas C. Love
- Succeeded by: William A. Moseley
- In office March 4, 1833 – March 3, 1835
- Preceded by: Constituency established
- Succeeded by: Thomas C. Love

Personal details
- Born: January 7, 1800 Moravia, New York, U.S.
- Died: March 8, 1874 (aged 74) Buffalo, New York, U.S.
- Party: Whig (1832–1855)
- Other political affiliations: Anti-Masonic (1828–1832); American (1855–1856)
- Spouses: Abigail Powers (m. 1826; died 1853) Caroline McIntosh (m. 1858)
- Children: Millard; Mary
- Parents: Nathaniel Fillmore; Phoebe Millard

Military service
- Branch/service: New York Militia; New York Guard
- Years of service: 1820s–1830s (Militia); 1860s–1870s (Guard)
- Rank: Major (Militia); Captain (Guard)
- Commands: Union Continentals (Guard)
- Battles/wars: American Civil War

This is a select bibliography of academic level books and journal articles, published mainly after World War II, (Note: Works published during or before World War II should be limited to areas where there are no significant post-World War II books on the subject or when the work in question has significant historical merit.) about the history of Millard Fillmore and his historical context.

Millard Fillmore (January 7, 1800 – March 8, 1874) was the 13th president of the United States, serving from 1850 to 1853. He was the last president to be a member of the Whig Party while in the White House, (Note: Abraham Lincoln was a Whig before he became president.) and the last to be neither a Democrat nor a Republican. A former member of the U.S. House of Representatives, Fillmore was elected vice president in 1848, and succeeded to the presidency when Zachary Taylor died in 1850. Fillmore was instrumental in passing the Compromise of 1850, which led to a brief truce in the battle over the expansion of slavery.

Works listed here are cited in the notes or bibliographies of scholarly sources. Each is published by an academic or major press, written by a recognized expert, or substantially reviewed in scholarly journals; borderline cases are omitted. A selection of primary sources are included. Many of the books below carry their own bibliographies; see the Further reading section for other bibliographies, and the External links section for historical sites, academic sites, and museums.

Citations follow APA style. (Note: Entries are in plain text APA 7 format without templates; templates are used only for reviews and notes.) Book have citations to academic journal or mainstream published reviews when available. For books only partly about the subject, relevant chapter or section titles are provided when useful and available. Translators of the original-language edition are included when possible. In cases where a title or name has appeared with more than one English spelling, the most recent published form is used and a footnote documents any earlier title under which the work appeared.

== General works ==
- Cohen, J. (2019). Chapter 2: Over By Dead Body. In Accidental presidents: Eight men who changed America. Simon & Schuster.
- Finkelman, P. (2011). Millard Fillmore. Times Books.
- Grayson, B. L. (1981). The unknown president: The administration of President Millard Fillmore. University Press of America.
- Rayback, R. J. (1959). Millard Fillmore: Biography of a president. Henry Stewart.
- Scarry, R. J. (2001). Millard Fillmore. McFarland.
- Smith, E. B. (1988). The presidencies of Zachary Taylor and Millard Fillmore. University Press of Kansas.

== Background and context ==
The below items contain significant information about Millard Fillmore or significant background and context for his life and presidency.

=== Political ===
- Benson, L. (1961). The concept of Jacksonian democracy: New York as a test case. Princeton University Press.
- Freehling, W. W. (1990). The road to disunion: Vol. 1. Secessionists at bay, 1776–1854. Oxford University Press.
- Hamilton, H. (1954). Democratic Senate leadership and the Compromise of 1850. The Mississippi Valley Historical Review, 41(3), 403.
- Holt, M. F. (1978). The political crisis of the 1850s. Wiley.
- Holt, M. F. (1999). The rise and fall of the American Whig Party: Jacksonian politics and the onset of the Civil War. Oxford University Press.
- Holt, M. F. (1992). Political parties and American political development from the age of Jackson to the age of Lincoln. Louisiana State University Press.
- Howe, D. W. (1979). The political culture of the American Whigs. University of Chicago Press.
- Howe, D. W. (2007). What hath God wrought: The transformation of America, 1815–1848. Oxford University Press.
- Kutolowski, K. S. (1984). Antimasonry reexamined: Social bases of the grass-roots party. The Journal of American History, 71(2), 269.
- Levine, B. (2001). Conservatism, nativism, and slavery: Thomas R. Whitney and the origins of the Know-Nothing Party. The Journal of American History, 88(2), 455.
- Potter, D. M. (1976). The impending crisis, 1848–1861 (D. E. Fehrenbacher, Ed.). Harper and Row.
- Rupp, R. O. (1988). Parties and the public good: Political antimasonry in New York reconsidered. Journal of the Early Republic, 8(3), 253.
- Silbey, J. H. (1991). The American political nation, 1838–1893. Stanford University Press.
- Varon, E. R. (2008). Disunion! The coming of the American Civil War, 1789–1859. University of North Carolina Press.
- Vaughn, W. P. (1983). The Antimasonic Party in the United States, 1826–1843. University Press of Kentucky.
- Watson, H. L. (1997). Humbug? Bah! Altschuler and Blumin and the riddle of the antebellum electorate. The Journal of American History, 84(3), 886.
- Wilentz, S. (2005). The rise of American democracy: Jefferson to Lincoln. W. W. Norton.

=== Slavery ===
- Anbinder, T. (1992). Nativism and slavery: The northern Know Nothings and the politics of the 1850s. Oxford University Press.
- Campbell, S. W. (1970). The slave catchers: Enforcement of the Fugitive Slave Law, 1850–1860. University of North Carolina Press.
- Grodzins, D. (2010). "Slave law" versus "lynch law" in Boston: Benjamin Robbins Curtis, Theodore Parker, and the fugitive slave crisis, 1850–1855. Massachusetts Historical Review, 12, 1.
- Middleton, S. (1987). The fugitive slave crisis in Cincinnati, 1850–1860: Resistance, enforcement, and Black refugees. The Journal of Negro History, 72(1–2), 20–32.

=== The Great Debate and the Compromise of 1850 ===
- Bordewich, F. M. (2012). America's great debate: Henry Clay, Stephen A. Douglas, and the compromise that preserved the Union. Simon & Schuster.
- Campbell, S. W. (1970). The slave catchers: Enforcement of the Fugitive Slave Law, 1850–1860. University of North Carolina Press.
- Grodzins, D. (2010). "Slave law" versus "lynch law" in Boston: Benjamin Robbins Curtis, Theodore Parker, and the fugitive slave crisis, 1850–1855. Massachusetts Historical Review, 12, 1.
- Hamilton, H. (1954). Democratic Senate leadership and the Compromise of 1850. The Mississippi Valley Historical Review, 41(3), 403.
- Hamilton, H. (1957). 'The cave of the winds' and the Compromise of 1850. The Journal of Southern History, 23(3), 331.
- Hamilton, H. (1964). Prologue to conflict: The crisis and compromise of 1850. University of Kentucky Press.
- Hodder, F. H. (1936). The authorship of the Compromise of 1850. The Mississippi Valley Historical Review, 22(4), 525.
- Maizlish, S. E. (2018). A strife of tongues: The Compromise of 1850 and the ideological foundations of the American Civil War. University of Virginia Press.
- Middleton, S. (1987). The fugitive slave crisis in Cincinnati, 1850–1860: Resistance, enforcement, and Black refugees. The Journal of Negro History, 72(1–2), 20–32.
- Russel, R. R. (1956). What was the Compromise of 1850?. The Journal of Southern History, 22(3), 292.
- Stephenson, N. W. (1935). California and the Compromise of 1850. Pacific Historical Review, 4(2), 114–122.
- Waugh, J. C. (2003). On the brink of Civil War: The Compromise of 1850 and how it changed the course of American history. Scholarly Resources.

=== Japan and Matthew Perry ===
- Hones, S. (2006). History, distance and text: Narratives of the 1853–1854 Perry expedition to Japan. Journal of Historical Geography, 32(3), 563–578.
- Keith, J. A. (2011). Civilization, race, and the Japan expedition's cultural diplomacy, 1853–1854. Diplomatic History, 35(2), 179–202.
- Wiley, P. B. (with Korogi, I.). (1990). Yankees in the land of the gods: Commodore Perry and the opening of Japan. Viking.

=== California ===
- Stanley, G. (1974). Racism and the early Republican Party: The 1856 presidential election in California. Pacific Historical Review, 43(2), 171–187.
- Stephenson, N. W. (1935). California and the Compromise of 1850. Pacific Historical Review, 4(2), 114–122.

==== Gold Rush ====
- Kanazawa, M. (2015). Golden rules: The origins of California water law in the Gold Rush. University of Chicago Press.
- Lapp, R. M. (1977). Blacks in Gold Rush California. Yale University Press.
- Madley, B. (2016). An American genocide: The United States and the California Indian catastrophe, 1846–1873. Yale University Press.
- McDowell, A. G. (2022). We the miners: Self-government in the California Gold Rush. Harvard University Press.
- McGuinness, A. (2008). Path of empire: Panama and the California Gold Rush. Cornell University Press.
- Monaghan, J. (1973). Chile, Peru, and the California Gold Rush of 1849. University of California Press.
- Mountford, B., & Tuffnell, S. (Eds.). (2018). A global history of gold rushes. University of California Press.
- Roberts, B. (2000). American alchemy: The California Gold Rush and middle-class culture. University of North Carolina Press.
- Rohrbough, M. J. (1997). Days of gold: The California Gold Rush and the American nation. University of California Press.
- Rohrbough, M. J. (2013). Rush to gold: The French and the California Gold Rush, 1848–1854. Yale University Press.
- Smith, S. L. (2013). Freedom's frontier: California and the struggle over unfree labor, emancipation, and Reconstruction. University of North Carolina Press.

=== Miscellaneous ===
- Bell, J. F. (2015). Poetry's place in the crisis and compromise of 1850. The Journal of the Civil War Era, 5(3), 399–421.
- Gienapp, W. E. (1987). The origins of the Republican Party, 1852–1856. Oxford University Press.
- Hinton, W. K. (1980). Millard Fillmore, Utah's friend in the White House. Utah Historical Quarterly, 48(2), 112–128.

== Contemporary biographies ==
- Bartlett, I. H. (1993). John C. Calhoun: A biography. W. W. Norton.
- Bauer, K. J. (1985). Zachary Taylor: Soldier, planter, statesman of the Old Southwest. Louisiana State University Press.
- Baxter, M. G. (1984). One and inseparable: Daniel Webster and the Union. Harvard University Press.
- Belohlavek, J. M. (2005). Broken glass: Caleb Cushing and the shattering of the Union. Kent State University Press.
- Blight, D. W. (2018). Frederick Douglass: Prophet of freedom. Simon & Schuster.
- Blue, F. J. (1987). Salmon P. Chase: A life in politics. Kent State University Press.
- Blue, F. J. (2005). No taint of compromise: Crusaders in antislavery politics. Louisiana State University Press.
- Burlingame, M. (2008). Abraham Lincoln: A life. Johns Hopkins University Press.
- Chaffin, T. (2014). Pathfinder: John Charles Frémont and the course of American empire. University of Oklahoma Press.
- Chambers, W. N. (1956). Old Bullion Benton, senator from the New West: Thomas Hart Benton, 1782–1858. Little, Brown.
- Cole, D. B. (1984). Martin Van Buren and the American political system. Princeton University Press.
- Cooper, W. J. (2000). Jefferson Davis, American. Alfred A. Knopf.
- Davis, W. C. (1991). Jefferson Davis: The man and his hour. HarperCollins.
- Donald, D. (1960). Charles Sumner and the coming of the Civil War. Alfred A. Knopf.
- Donald, D. H. (1995). Lincoln. Simon & Schuster.
- Duberman, M. B. (1961). Charles Francis Adams, 1807–1886. Houghton Mifflin.
- Elder, R. (2021). Calhoun: American heretic. Basic Books.
- Faust, D. G. (1982). James Henry Hammond and the Old South: A design for mastery. Louisiana State University Press.
- Gara, L. (1991). The presidency of Franklin Pierce. University Press of Kansas.
- Guelzo, A. C. (1999). Abraham Lincoln: Redeemer president. William B. Eerdmans.
- Haley, J. L. (2002). Sam Houston. University of Oklahoma Press.
- Hamilton, H. (1951). Zachary Taylor: Soldier in the White House. Bobbs-Merrill.
- Harrold, S. (1986). Gamaliel Bailey and antislavery union. Kent State University Press.
- Heidler, D. S., & Heidler, J. T. (2010). Henry Clay: The essential American. Random House.
- Hunt, H. D. (1969). Hannibal Hamlin of Maine: Lincoln's first vice-president. Syracuse University Press.
- Johannsen, R. W. (1973). Stephen A. Douglas. Oxford University Press.
- Johnson, T. D. (1998). Winfield Scott: The quest for military glory. University Press of Kansas.
- Kirwan, A. D. (1962). John J. Crittenden: The struggle for the Union. University of Kentucky Press.
- Klein, P. S. (1962). President James Buchanan: A biography. Pennsylvania State University Press.
- Klunder, W. C. (1996). Lewis Cass and the politics of moderation. Kent State University Press.
- McFeely, W. S. (1991). Frederick Douglass. W. W. Norton.
- Nichols, R. F. (1931). Franklin Pierce: Young Hickory of the Granite Hills. University of Pennsylvania Press.
- Niven, J. (1983). Martin Van Buren: The romantic age of American politics. Oxford University Press.
- Niven, J. (1988). John C. Calhoun and the price of Union: A biography. Louisiana State University Press.
- Niven, J. (1995). Salmon P. Chase: A biography. Oxford University Press.
- Parks, J. H. (1950). John Bell of Tennessee. Louisiana State University Press.
- Peterson, M. D. (1987). The great triumvirate: Webster, Clay, and Calhoun. Oxford University Press.
- Remini, R. V. (1991). Henry Clay: Statesman for the Union. W. W. Norton.
- Remini, R. V. (1997). Daniel Webster: The man and his time. W. W. Norton.
- Schott, T. E. (1988). Alexander H. Stephens of Georgia: A biography. Louisiana State University Press.
- Sewell, R. H. (1965). John P. Hale and the politics of abolition. Harvard University Press.
- Spencer, I. D. (1959). The victor and the spoils: A life of William L. Marcy. Brown University Press.
- Stahr, W. (2012). Seward: Lincoln's indispensable man. Simon & Schuster.
- Stewart, J. B. (1970). Joshua R. Giddings and the tactics of radical politics. Press of Case Western Reserve University.
- Taylor, A.-M. (2001). Young Charles Sumner and the legacy of the American Enlightenment, 1811–1851. University of Massachusetts Press.
- Thompson, W. Y. (1966). Robert Toombs of Georgia. Louisiana State University Press.
- Trefousse, H. L. (1997). Thaddeus Stevens: Nineteenth-century egalitarian. University of North Carolina Press.
- Van Deusen, G. G. (1947). Thurlow Weed: Wizard of the lobby. Little, Brown.
- Van Deusen, G. G. (1953). Horace Greeley: Nineteenth-century crusader. University of Pennsylvania Press.
- Van Deusen, G. G. (1967). William Henry Seward. Oxford University Press.
- Wallner, P. A. (2004). Franklin Pierce: New Hampshire's favorite son. Plaidswede.
- Walther, E. H. (1992). The fire-eaters. Louisiana State University Press.
- Walther, E. H. (2006). William Lowndes Yancey and the coming of the Civil War. University of North Carolina Press.

== Historiography ==
- Anbinder, T. (2006). Nativism and prejudice against immigrants. In R. Ueda (Ed.), A companion to American immigration (pp. 177–201). Blackwell Publishing.
- Eyal, Y. (2010). The "party period" framework and the election of 1848. Reviews in American History, 38(1), 80–86.
- Formisano, R. P. (1976). Toward a reorientation of Jacksonian politics: A review of the literature, 1959–1975. The Journal of American History, 63(1), 42.
- Formisano, R. P. (1999). The "party period" revisited. The Journal of American History, 86(1), 93.
- Pressly, T. J. (1954). Americans interpret their Civil War. Princeton University Press.
- Silbey, J. H. (1964). The Civil War synthesis in American political history. Civil War History, 10(2), 130–140.

== Primary sources ==
- Dix, D. L., & Fillmore, M. (1975). The lady and the president: The letters of Dorothea Dix and Millard Fillmore (C. M. Snyder, Ed.). University Press of Kentucky.
- Fillmore, M. (1907). Millard Fillmore papers (F. H. Severance, Ed.; Vols. 1–2). Buffalo Historical Society.
- Fillmore, M. (n.d.). Millard Fillmore papers [Digital collection]. Manuscript Division, Library of Congress.

=== Other ===
- Barre, W. L. (1856). The life and public services of Millard Fillmore. Wanzer, McKim.
- Benton, T. H. (1854–1856). Thirty years' view; or, A history of the working of the American government for thirty years, from 1820 to 1850 (2 vols.). D. Appleton.
- Bigelow, J. (1856). Memoir of the life and public services of John Charles Frémont. Derby & Jackson.
- Bigelow, J. (1909). Retrospections of an active life. Baker & Taylor.
- Chamberlain, I. (1856). Biography of Millard Fillmore. Thomas & Lathrops.
- Chase, S. P. (1994). The Salmon P. Chase papers: Vol. 2. Correspondence, 1823–1857 (J. Niven, Ed.). Kent State University Press.
- Clay, H. (1855). The private correspondence of Henry Clay (C. Colton, Ed.). A. S. Barnes.
- Clay, H. (1857). The life, correspondence, and speeches of Henry Clay (C. Colton, Ed.; 6 vols.). A. S. Barnes.
- Coleman, A. M. B. C. (Ed.). (1871). The life of John J. Crittenden, with selections from his correspondence and speeches (2 vols.). J. B. Lippincott.
- Colton, C. (1856). The last seven years of the life of Henry Clay. A. S. Barnes.
- Curtis, G. T. (1870). Life of Daniel Webster. D. Appleton.
- Curtis, G. T. (1878). The last years of Daniel Webster: A monograph. D. Appleton.
- Hawks, F. L. (1856). Narrative of the expedition of an American squadron to the China seas and Japan, performed in the years 1852, 1853, and 1854, under the command of Commodore M. C. Perry (3 vols.). Beverley Tucker, Senate Printer.
- Hone, P. (1889). The diary of Philip Hone, 1828–1851 (B. Tuckerman, Ed.). Dodd, Mead.
- Hone, P. (1927). The diary of Philip Hone, 1828–1851 (A. Nevins, Ed.). Dodd, Mead.
- Julian, G. W. (1850). Speech of Hon. George W. Julian, of Indiana, on the slavery question, delivered in the House of Representatives, May 14, 1850. Printed at the Congressional Globe Office.
- Julian, G. W. (1872). Speeches on political questions, 1850–1868. Hurd and Houghton.
- Julian, G. W. (1884). Political recollections, 1840 to 1872. Jansen, McClurg.
- Poore, B. P. (1886). Perley's reminiscences of sixty years in the national metropolis (2 vols.). Hubbard Brothers.
- Sargent, N. (1875). Public men and events from the commencement of Mr. Monroe's administration, in 1817, to the close of Mr. Fillmore's administration, in 1853 (2 vols.). J. B. Lippincott.
- Seward, F. W. (1891). Seward at Washington, as senator and secretary of state: A memoir of his life, with selections from his letters. Derby and Miller.
- Strong, G. T. (1952). The diary of George Templeton Strong (A. Nevins & M. H. Thomas, Eds.; 4 vols.). Macmillan.
- Webster, D. (1853). The works of Daniel Webster (E. Everett, Ed.; 6 vols.). Little, Brown.
- Weed, T. (1884). Life of Thurlow Weed, including his autobiography and a memoir (H. A. Weed & T. W. Barnes, Eds.; 2 vols.). Houghton Mifflin.
- Wilson, H. (1875–1877). History of the rise and fall of the slave power in America (3 vols.). J. R. Osgood.

== See also ==
- Whig Party (United States)
- 1848 United States presidential election
- Compromise of 1850
- Fugitive Slave Act of 1850
- Popular sovereignty in the United States
