= Milward =

Milward may refer to:

- Milward (name), list of people with the name
- Milward Patch, patch in the United States
- Henry Milward & Sons, English manufacturer
- Tasker Milward Voluntary Controlled School, secondary school in Haverfordwest, Pembrokeshire, South West Wales

== See also ==
- Millward (disambiguation)
