= Millard (given name) =

Millard is an English masculine given name transferred from the surname.

Notable people and fictional characters with the name include:

== People ==
- Millard H. Alexander (born 1943), American theoretical chemist
- Millard Anderson, American athlete, coach, and college athletics administrator
- Millard Bass (died 2018), American forensic pathologist
- Millard Bloomer (1899–1974), American fencer
- Millard Bradford (born 1999), American football player
- Millard Caldwell (1897–1984), American judge and politician
- Millard Carr Van Duzee (1860–1934), American entomologist
- Millard Davis, American lawyer, farmer, and politician
- Millard Drexler (born 1944), American businessman and investor
- Millard Erickson (born 1932), American theologian
- Millard Fillmore (1800–1874), 13th president of the United States
- Millard Powers Fillmore (1828–1889), American lawyer
- Millard Fuller (1935–2009), American lawyer and humanitarian
- Millard E. Gladfelter (1900–1995), American academic administrator
- Millard Preston Goodfellow (1892–1973), American journalist, publisher and diplomat
- Millard Hall (1926–2005), American journalist
- Millard Hampton (born 1956), American sprinter
- Millard Harmon (1888–1945), US Army Air Forces general
- Millard Haywood (1853–1911), American painter
- Millard Johnson (producer) (1860–1946), Australian film producer
- Millard M. Kapitz (1906–1978), American politician
- Millard Kaufman (1917–2009), American screenwriter and novelist
- Millard Lampell (1919–1997), American screenwriter
- Millard Lang (1912–2002), American soccer and lacrosse player
- Millard F. Malin (1891-1974), American sculptor
- Millard Meiss (1904–1975), American art historian
- Millard Mitchell (1903–1953), American character actor
- Millard Naylor (1901–1979), American football coach
- Millard Powers (born 1965), American musician
- Millard Robinson (1913–1999), American baseball player and football coach
- Millard Ruud (1917–1997), American lawyer
- Millard Seldin (1926–2020), American businessman and horsebreeder
- Millard Sheets (1907–1989), American artist, teacher, and architectural designer
- Millard F. Singleton (1859–1939), African-American political leader and civil servant
- Millard Tydings (1890–1961), American politician
- Millard Webb (1893–1935), American film director
- Millard K. Wilson (1890–1933), American actor

== Fictional characters ==
- Millard J. Monkey, from Jungle Jam and Friends: The Radio Show!
- Millard Salter, the title character of the novel Millard Salter's Last Day
- Millard the Mallard, mascot of WRVA radio in Richmond, Virginia

== See also ==
- Millard (disambiguation)
- Millard (surname)
- Milliard (surname)
