= Millward =

Millward is a surname meaning someone in charge of a mill.

- Alun Millward Davies (born 1955), Welsh biologist
- Andrew Millward (born 1972), Welsh rugby union player
- Anna Millward (born 1971), Australian cyclist
- Arthur Millward (1858–1933), English cricketer and test match umpire
- Carl King-Millward (1935–2000), British mathematician
- Charles Millward (1830–1892), English musician, composer, and actor
- Doug Millward (1931–2000), English footballer and manager
- Doug Millward (footballer, born 1862), English footballer
- Edward Millward (1930–2020), Welsh academic and politician
- Ernie Millward (1887–1962), English footballer
- F. Millward Grey (1899–1957), English painter, etcher, and art teacher
- George Millward McDougall (1821–1876), Canadian Methodist missionary
- Ian Millward (born 1960), Australian rugby league footballer, coach and commentator
- James A. Millward (born 1961), American historian
- Jessica Millward (born 1973), American historian
- Jessie Millward (1861–1932), English actress
- Perry Millward (born 1992), British actor
- Rachel Millward (born 1977), British politician
- Roger Millward (1947–2016), Former GB & England international rugby league footballer
- Russell Hastings Millward (1877–1958), American journalist and explorer
- Sid Millward (1909–1972), British musician
- Stephanie Millward (born 1981), British Paralympic swimmer
- William Millward (1822–1871), American politician

== See also ==
- Milward (name), list of people with a similar name
- Millard (disambiguation)
