= Millard (surname) =

Millard is an English occupational surname, an assimilated form of Milward, formed from mill and ward, meaning mill-keeper or miller.

Notable people with the name include:

- Adriana Millard (born 1926), Chilean sprinter
- Alan Millard (born 1937), British language scholar
- Alan Millard (politician) (1856–1915), Australian politician
- Albert Millard (born 1868), English footballer
- Alby Millard (1906–1983), Australian rules footballer
- Alexandra Millard (born 2001), British runner
- Alice Millard (1873–1938), American bookseller
- Arthur Millard (born 1869), English footballer
- Auguste Louis Jules Millard (1830–1915), French physician
- Bart Millard (born 1972), American singer and songwriter
- Benjamin Franklin Millard (1850–1926), American politician
- Bert Millard (1898–after 1925), British professional footballer
- Betty Millard (1911–2010), American Communist feminist
- Billy Millard, Australian rugby union coach
- Brian Millard (died 2009), British politician
- Bryan Millard (born 1960), American football player
- Burton Millard (1828–1862), American politician in Wisconsin
- Candice Millard (born 1967), American writer and journalist
- Caroline Millard (died 1894), Anglo-Irish wood engraver
- Casey Riordan Millard (born 1973), American painter
- Charles Millard (1896–1978), Canadian trade union activist and politician
- Charles D. Millard (1873–1944), American politician
- Charles E. F. Millard (born 1957), American politician
- Chauncey Millard (1851–1869), American outlaw
- Christopher Sclater Millard (1872–1927), Bibliographer
- Daren Millard (born 1970), Canadian sportscaster
- Daryl Millard (born 1985), British rugby league player
- Dave Millard (born 1979), Scottish rugby union player
- David Millard (cricketer) (1931–1978), South African cricketer
- David R. Millard (born 1953), American politician
- Don Millard (born 1955), American electrical engineer
- Dud Millard (1901–1954), Australian rugby league footballer
- Ed Millard (born 1946), Canadian wrestler
- Eleanor Millard (born 1942), Canadian writer and politician
- Elisabeth I. Millard (born 1954), American diplomat
- Evelyn Millard (1869–1941), English Shakespearean actress
- Ezra Millard (1833–1886), Mayor of Omaha, Nebraska
- Francis Millard (1914–1958), American wrestler
- Frank Millard (1892–1976), American politician and football player
- Frank Millard (baseball) (1865–1892), American baseball player
- George Millard (1914–2009), Australian rules footballer
- Gladys Millard (1891–1964), Canadian Girl Guide leader
- Glenda Millard, Australian writer
- Guy Millard (1917–2013), British diplomat
- Harri Millard (born 1996), Welsh rugby union footballer
- Harrison Millard (1830–1895), American composer
- Helene Millard (1905–1974) American actress
- Henry Millard (c.1796–1844), Texan revolutionary
- Jason Millard (born 1989), American professional golfer
- Joël Millard (born 1946), French cyclist
- Jonas Millard (born 1981), Swedish politician
- Joseph Millard (1836–1922), U.S. Senator from Nebraska
- Keith Millard (born 1962), American football player
- Keith Millard (speedway rider) (born 1964), English speedway rider
- Kerry Millard (born 1972), Australian politician
- Killick Millard (1870–1952), British euthanasia campaigner
- Laura Millard (born 1961), Canadian artist
- Len Millard (1919–1997), British football player
- Lexie Millard (born 1993), American cyclist
- Margaret Millard (born 1939), New Zealand community activist
- Mike Millard (died 1990), American bootleg recorder
- Muriel Millard (1922–2014), Canadian actress
- Naomi A. H. Millard (1914–1997), South African biologist
- Norman Millard (1899–1969), Anglican archdeacon
- Oscar Millard (1908–1990), British screenwriter
- Patrick Ferguson Millard (1902–1972), English painter
- Peter Millard (1937–2018), British physician
- Ralph Millard (1919–2011), American plastic surgeon
- Richard Millard (1914–2018), American suffragan bishop
- Rosie Millard (born 1965), British broadcaster and writer
- Ross Millard (born 1982), British guitarist
- Russ Millard (born 1973), American basketball player
- Ryan Millard (born 1987), Fiji international rugby league footballer
- S. S. Millard, American film producer
- Shane Millard (born 1975), British rugby league player
- Spencer G. Millard (1856–1895), American politician from California
- Stephen C. Millard (1841–1914), American politician from New York
- Terrance Millard (1929–2019), South African horse racing trainer
- Thomas Franklin Fairfax Millard (1868–1942), American war correspondent
- Trey Millard (born 1991), American football player
- Walter Samuel Millard (1864–1952), British entrepreneur and naturalist
- Wenda Harris Millard, American businesswoman
- Will Millard, British expedition leader
- William Millard (businessman) (born 1932), American businessman
- William Millard (cricketer) (1856–1923), English cricketer
- William Millard (politician) (1844–1921), Australian politician

== See also ==
- Millard (disambiguation)
- Millard (given name)
- Milliard (surname)
- Pierre de Milard (1736–1778), French Navy officer
- James Millerd (1637 to 1715), Bristol cloth merchant and cartographer
