= Millward (disambiguation) =

Millward is a surname.

Millward may also refer to:

- Millward Township, Aitkin County, Minnesota, township in Aitkin County, Minnesota, United States
- Kantar Millward Brown, global research agency, part of the Kantar Group
- Caroline Millward House, historic house, Maywood, Illinois, United States
