= Compromise of 1850 =

American legislative compromise

- Long title: A series of five separate legislative acts balancing the interests of slave and free states
- Enacted by: the 31st United States Congress
- Effective: September 1850

Citations
- Statutes at Large: Texas Boundary Act: 9 Stat. 446 (Sept. 9); New Mexico Territorial Act: 9 Stat. 446 (Sept. 9); California Admission Act: 9 Stat. 452 (Sept. 9); Utah Territorial Act: 9 Stat. 453 (Sept. 9); Fugitive Slave Act: 9 Stat. 462 (Sept. 18); Slave Trade Suppression Act: 9 Stat. 467 (Sept. 20)

Codification
- Acts amended: Fugitive Slave Act of 1793
- Acts repealed: Missouri Compromise (partially via popular sovereignty)

Legislative history
- Introduced in the Senate by Henry Clay on January 29, 1850; Committee consideration by Committee of Thirteen; Signed into law by President Millard Fillmore on September 9–20, 1850

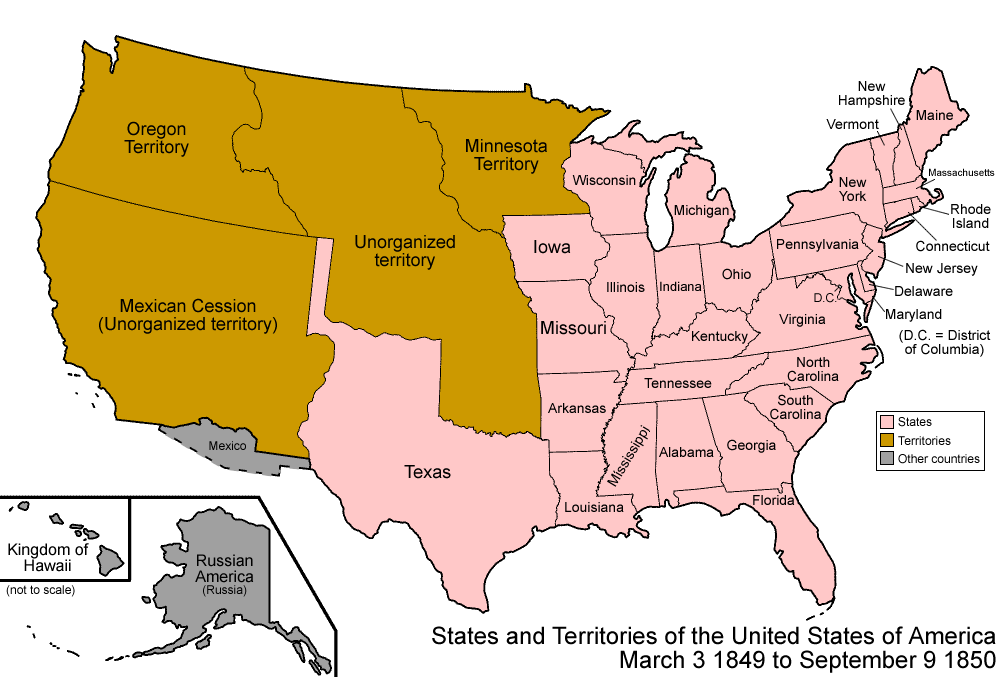
The United States after the ratification of the Treaty of Guadalupe Hidalgo, with the Mexican Cession still unorganized

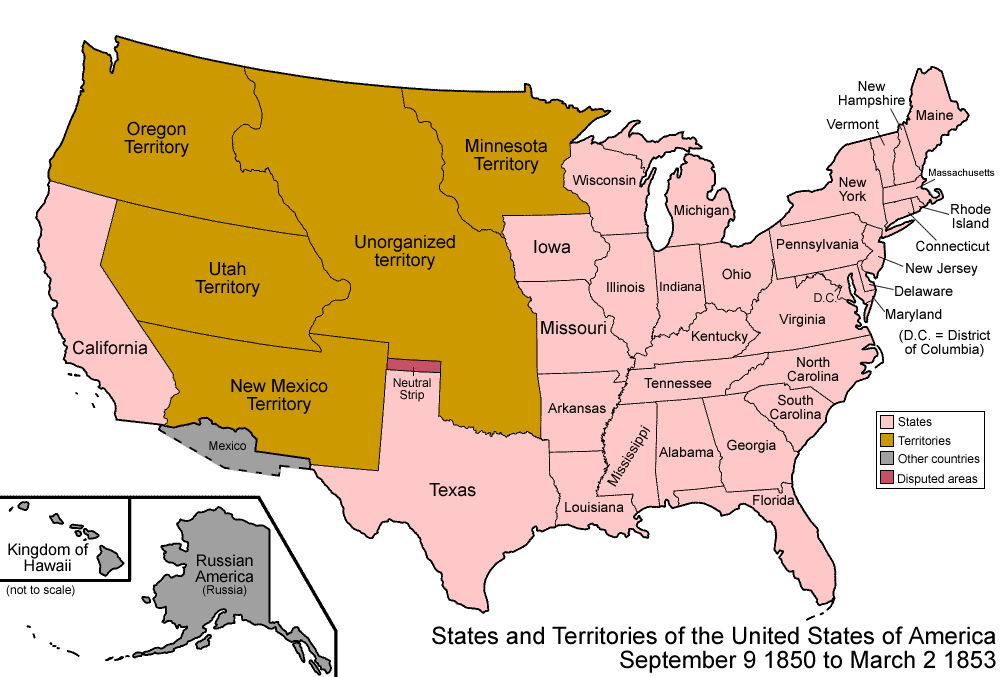
The United States after the Compromise of 1850

The Compromise of 1850 was a package of five separate bills passed by the United States Congress in September 1850 that temporarily defused tensions between slave and free states during the years leading up to the American Civil War. Designed by Whig senator Henry Clay and Democratic senator Stephen A. Douglas, with the support of President Millard Fillmore, the compromise centered on how to handle slavery in recently acquired territories from the Mexican–American War (1846–1848).

The provisions of the compromise included a provision that approved California's request to enter the Union as a free state, and strengthened fugitive slave laws with the Fugitive Slave Act of 1850. The compromise also banned the slave trade in Washington, D.C. (while still allowing slavery), defined northern and western borders for Texas, while establishing a territorial government for the Territory of New Mexico that included no restrictions on whether any future state from this territory would be a free or slave state, and established a territorial government for the Territory of Utah, also with no restrictions if the territory would become a slave or free state.

A debate over slavery in the territories erupted during the Mexican–American War, as many white Southerners sought to expand slavery to the newly acquired lands and many Northerners opposed any such expansion. The debate was further complicated by Texas's claim to all former Mexican territory north and east of the Rio Grande, including areas it had never effectively controlled. These issues prevented the passage of organic acts to create organized territorial governments for the land acquired in the Mexican–American War.

In early 1850, Clay proposed a package of eight bills that would settle most of the pressing issues before Congress. Clay's proposal was opposed by President Zachary Taylor, anti-slavery Whigs like William Seward, and pro-slavery Democrats like John C. Calhoun, so congressional debate over the territories continued. The debate over the bill was among the most famous in Congressional history, where the divisions deteriorated into fistfights and the drawing of guns on the floor of Congress.

After Taylor died, he was succeeded by Fillmore, at which time Stephen A. Douglas took the lead in passing Clay's compromise through Congress as five separate bills. Under the compromise, Texas surrendered its claims to present-day New Mexico and other states in return for federal assumption of Texas's public debt. California was admitted as a free state, while the remaining portions of the Mexican Cession were organized into the New Mexico Territory and Utah Territory. Under the concept of popular sovereignty, the white people of each territory would decide whether or not slavery would be permitted. The compromise also included a stringent Fugitive Slave Law and banned the slave trade in Washington, D.C. The issue of slavery in the territories would be re-opened by the Kansas–Nebraska Act (1854), but the Compromise of 1850 played a major role in postponing the Civil War.

== Background ==
The Republic of Texas declared its independence from Mexico following the Texas Revolution of 1836, and, partly because Texas had been settled by a large number of Americans, there was a very strong sentiment in both Texas and the United States for the annexation of Texas by the United States. In December 1845, President James K. Polk signed a resolution annexing Texas, and Texas became the 28th state in the union. Polk, an expansionist and slave owner, sought further expansion through the acquisition of the Mexican province of Alta California, which represented new lands to settle as well as a potential gateway to trade in Asia. His administration attempted to purchase California from Mexico, but the annexation of Texas stoked tensions between Mexico and the United States. Relations between the two countries were further complicated by Texas's claim to all land north of the Rio Grande; Mexico argued that the more northern Nueces River was the proper Texan border.

In March 1846, a skirmish broke out on the northern side of the Rio Grande, ending in the death or capture of dozens of American soldiers. Soon afterward, the United States declared war on Mexico which became known as the Mexican–American War. In August 1846, Polk asked Congress for an appropriation that he hoped to use as a down payment for the purchase of California in a treaty with Mexico. This action ignited a debate over the status of future territories. A freshman Democratic Representative, David Wilmot of Pennsylvania, offered an amendment known as the Wilmot Proviso that would ban slavery in any newly acquired lands. The Wilmot Proviso was ultimately defeated in the Senate, but it inserted the slavery debate into national politics.

In September 1847, an American army under the command of General Winfield Scott captured the Mexican capital in the Battle for Mexico City. Several months later, Mexican and American negotiators agreed to the Treaty of Guadalupe Hidalgo, whereby Mexico agreed to recognize the Rio Grande as Texas's southern border and to cede Alta California and New Mexico.

The Missouri Compromise had settled the issue of the geographic reach of slavery within the Louisiana Purchase territories by prohibiting slavery in states north of the 36°30′ latitude, and Polk sought to extend this line into the newly acquired territory. However, the divisive issue of slavery blocked any such legislation. As his term came to a close, Polk signed the lone territorial bill passed by Congress, which established the Territory of Oregon and banned slavery within it. Polk decided not to seek re-election in the 1848 presidential election, and the 1848 election was won by the Whig ticket of Zachary Taylor and Millard Fillmore.

Prophetically, Ralph Waldo Emerson quipped that "Mexico will poison us", referring to the ensuing divisions that developed around the question of whether newly conquered lands would be slave or free. When Taylor was elected president in 1848, the issue was not yet apparent. Taylor was both a Whig and a slaveholder. Though Whigs were increasingly anti-slavery, Taylor's slaveholding had reassured the South, and he won handily. Taylor made a key electoral promise that he would not veto any congressional resolution on slavery. Much to the horror of Southerners, however, Taylor indicated that true to his promise, he would not even veto the Wilmot Proviso if it were passed. Tensions accelerated quickly in the fall of 1849.

Midterm elections worsened matters, as the Free Soil Party had gained 12 seats, which put it in the position to be a king-maker in the closely divided House: 105 Whigs to 112 Democrats. After three weeks and 62 ballots, the House could not elect a speaker; the main issue was slavery in the new territories. The turmoil of that period was severe, with a loaded revolver being drawn on the floor of Congress, fistfights occurred between Northerners and Southerners, and even Senator Jefferson Davis challenged an Illinois representative to a duel. Southern representatives increasingly bandied around the idea of secession. Finally, the House adopted a resolution that allowed a speaker to be elected with a plurality, and elected Howell Cobb on the 63rd ballot. As James McPherson puts it: "It was an inauspicious start to the 1850's."

== Issues ==
Three major issues were addressed by the Compromise of 1850: a variety of boundary issues, the status of territory issues, and the issue of slavery. While capable of analytical distinction, the boundary and territory issues were included in the overarching issue of slavery. Pro-slavery and anti-slavery interests were each concerned with the amount of land on which slavery was permitted, and with the number of States in the slave or free camps. Since Texas was a slave state, not only the residents of that state, but also both camps on a national scale had an interest in the size of Texas.

=== Texas ===
Among several proposals, Texas's borders were set in accordance with the Pearce Plan

The independent Republic of Texas won the decisive Battle of San Jacinto (April 21, 1836) against Mexico and captured Mexican president Antonio Lopez de Santa Anna. He signed the Treaties of Velasco, which recognized the Rio Grande as the boundary of the Republic of Texas. The treaties were repudiated by the government of Mexico, which insisted that Mexico remained sovereign over Texas, and since Santa Anna had signed the treaty under coercion, it promised to reclaim the lost territories.

To the extent that there was a de facto recognition, Mexico treated the Nueces River as its northern boundary control. A vast, largely unsettled area, lay between the two rivers. Neither Mexico nor the Republic of Texas had the military strength to assert its territorial claim. On December 29, 1845, the Republic of Texas was annexed by the United States and became their 28th state. To facilitate the annexation, Sam Houston played a ploy on the American government by flirting with the British. The British believed that they could make the state abolish slavery by purchasing it. However, Southern leaders, alarmed by the threat of British emancipation of Texan slaves, pushed harder for annexation. Eventually, John Tyler, in hopes of appealing to southern Democrats, led the push for annexation with Abel Upshur. Texas was staunchly committed to slavery, with its constitution making it illegal for the legislature to free slaves.

The United States inherited the Texas-Mexican boundary dispute after annexing Texas, which quickly led to the Mexican-American War. The Treaty of Guadalupe Hidalgo, which ended the war, defined the new Mexico–United States border, which followed the Rio Grande in part, but made no specific reference the claims of the Republic of Texas. The southwestern part of the ceded territory was referred to as the Mexican Cession; but the boundaries between this Cession and the State of Texas were unclear, and Texas continued to claim all the territory north and east of the Rio Grande, which included a large stretch of land that it had never effectively controlled in present-day eastern New Mexico. New Mexico had long prohibited slavery, a fact that affected the debate over its territorial status, but many New Mexican leaders opposed joining Texas primarily because Texas's capital lay hundreds of miles away and because Texas and New Mexico had a history of conflict dating back to the 1841 Santa Fe Expedition. Outside of Texas, many Southern leaders supported Texas's claims to New Mexico, in order to secure as much territory as possible for the expansion of slavery.

Another issue that would affect the compromise was Texas's debt; it had approximately $10 million in debt left over from its time as an independent nation, and that debt would become a factor in the debates over the territories.

=== California ===
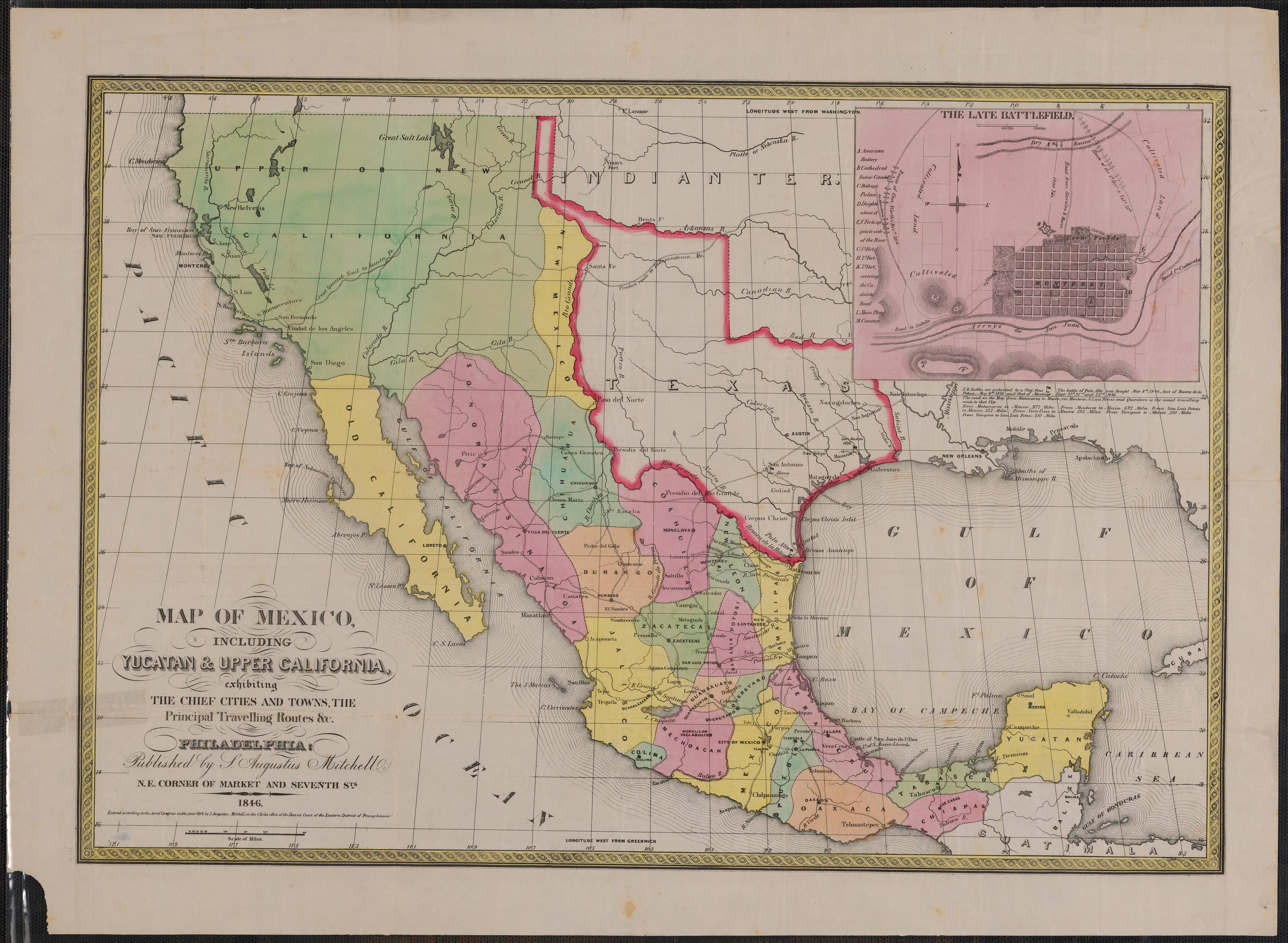
Map of Mexico. S. Augustus Mitchell, Philadelphia, 1847. New California is depicted with a northeastern border at the meridian leading north of the Rio Grande headwaters.

California was part of the Mexican Cession. After the Mexican War, California was essentially run by American military governors. President James K. Polk tried to get Congress to establish a territorial government in California officially, but the increasingly sectional debates prevented that. The South wanted to extend slave territory to Southern California and to the Pacific Coast, but the North did not. The issue of whether it would be free or slave might well have gone undecided for years, as it had already after the end of the Mexican American war, if not for the finding of natural riches.

Near the end of Polk's term in 1848, news reached Washington that gold had been discovered in California. This began the California Gold Rush, which transformed California from a sleepy and almost forgotten land into a burgeoning hub with a population bigger than Delaware or Florida. The mostly lawless land found itself in desperate need of governance. Californians wanted to be made into a territory or state promptly. In response to growing demand for a better, more representative government, a Constitutional Convention was held in 1849. The delegates unanimously outlawed slavery. They had no interest in extending the Missouri Compromise Line through California and splitting the state; the lightly populated southern half never had slavery and was heavily Hispanic. The issue of California would play a central role in the exhausting 1849 speaker dispute.

=== Other issues ===
Aside from the disposition of the territories, other issues had risen to prominence during the Taylor years. The Washington, D.C. slave trade angered many in the North, who viewed the presence of slavery in the capital as a blemish on the nation. Disputes around fugitive slaves had grown since 1830 in part due to improving means of transportation, as the enslaved used roads, railroads, and ships to escape. The Fugitive Slave Act of 1793 had granted jurisdiction to all state and federal judges over cases regarding fugitive slaves, but several Northern states, dissatisfied by the lack of due process in these cases, had passed personal liberty laws that made it more difficult to return alleged fugitive slaves to the South. Congress also faced the issue of Utah, which like California and New Mexico, had been ceded by Mexico. Utah was inhabited largely by Latter-day Saints whose then-practice of polygamy was unpopular elsewhere in the United States.

== Passage ==
=== Taylor takes office ===
When Taylor took office, the issue of slavery in the Mexican Cession remained unresolved. While a Southern slaveowner himself, Taylor believed that slavery was not economically feasible in the Mexican Cession, and as such, he opposed slavery in those territories as a needless source of controversy. In Taylor's view, the best way forward was to admit California as a state rather than a federal territory, as it would leave the slavery question out of Congress's hands. The timing for statehood was in Taylor's favor, as the Gold Rush was well underway at the time of his inauguration, and California's population was exploding. In October 1849, a California constitutional convention unanimously agreed to join the Union—and to ban slavery within their borders. In his December 1849 State of the Union report, Taylor endorsed California's and New Mexico's applications for statehood, and recommended that Congress approve them as written and "should abstain from the introduction of those exciting topics of a sectional character".

=== Main figures ===
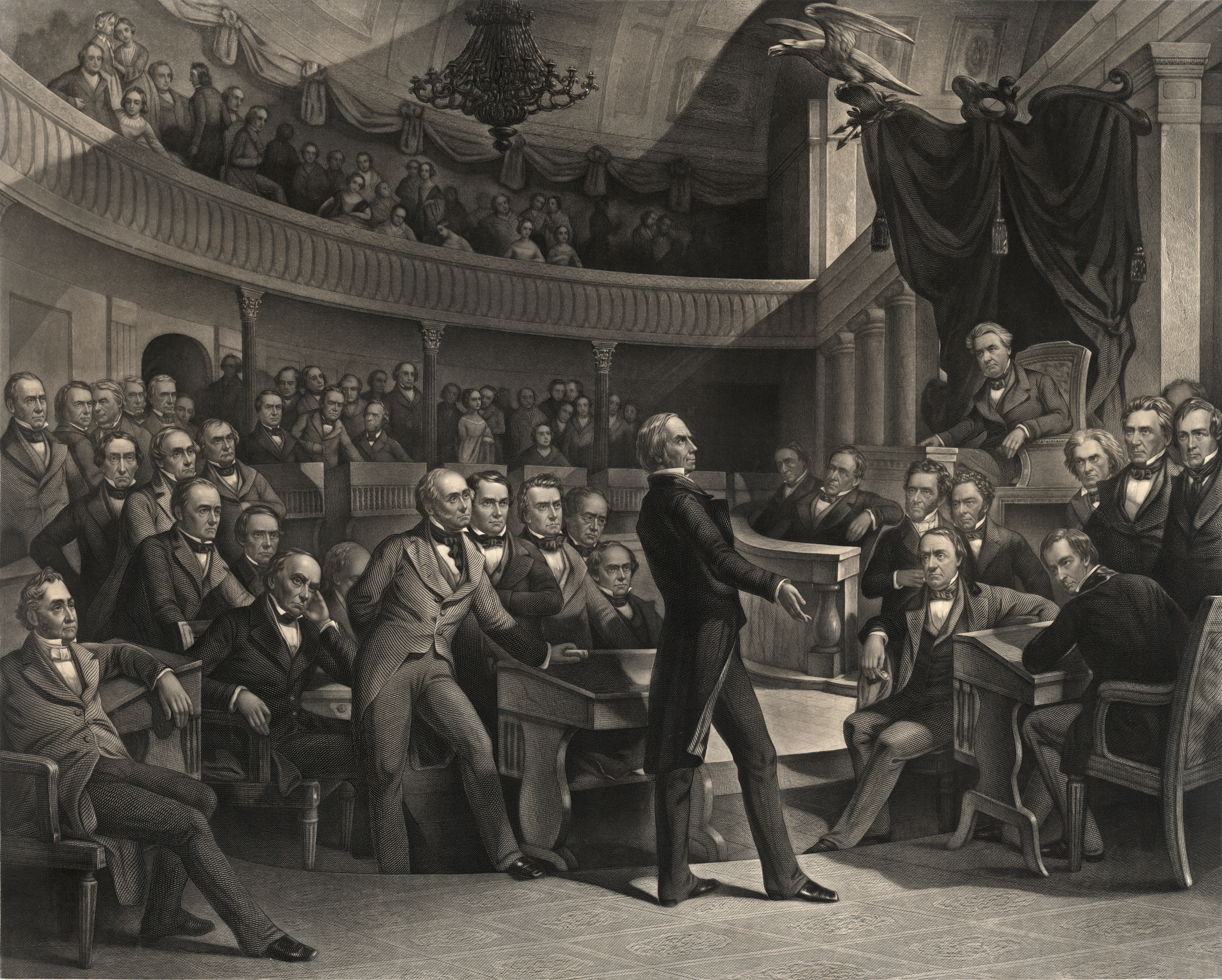
The United States Senate, A.D. 1850 (engraving by Peter F. Rothermel): Henry Clay takes the floor of the Old Senate Chamber; Vice President Millard Fillmore presides as John C. Calhoun (to the right of Fillmore's chair) and Daniel Webster (seated to the left of Clay) look on.

The problem of what to do with the territories became the leading issue in Congress. So began the most famous debates in Congressional history. Heading the debates were three titans of Congress: Henry Clay, Daniel Webster, and John C. Calhoun. All had been born during the American Revolution, and had carried the torch of the Founding Fathers.

Clay and Webster represented the nationalist view and sought compromise, while Calhoun was a Southern sectionalist who warned of imminent disaster. The triumvirate would be broken before long as Calhoun would die of tuberculosis. In March, shortly before his death, his final speech was delivered by his friend, Virginia Senator James M. Mason, as the blanket-wrapped Calhoun sat nearby, too weak to do it himself. He provided a warning that the South realized the balance between North and South was broken, and that any further imbalance might lead to war.

Other players in this drama included a variety of rising politicians who would play key roles in the Civil War, such as the staunch anti-slavery advocate William H. Seward and Salmon P. Chase, both of whom would be in Lincoln's cabinet, and the future president of the Confederacy, Jefferson Davis and Stephen A. Douglas.

=== Clay proposes compromise ===
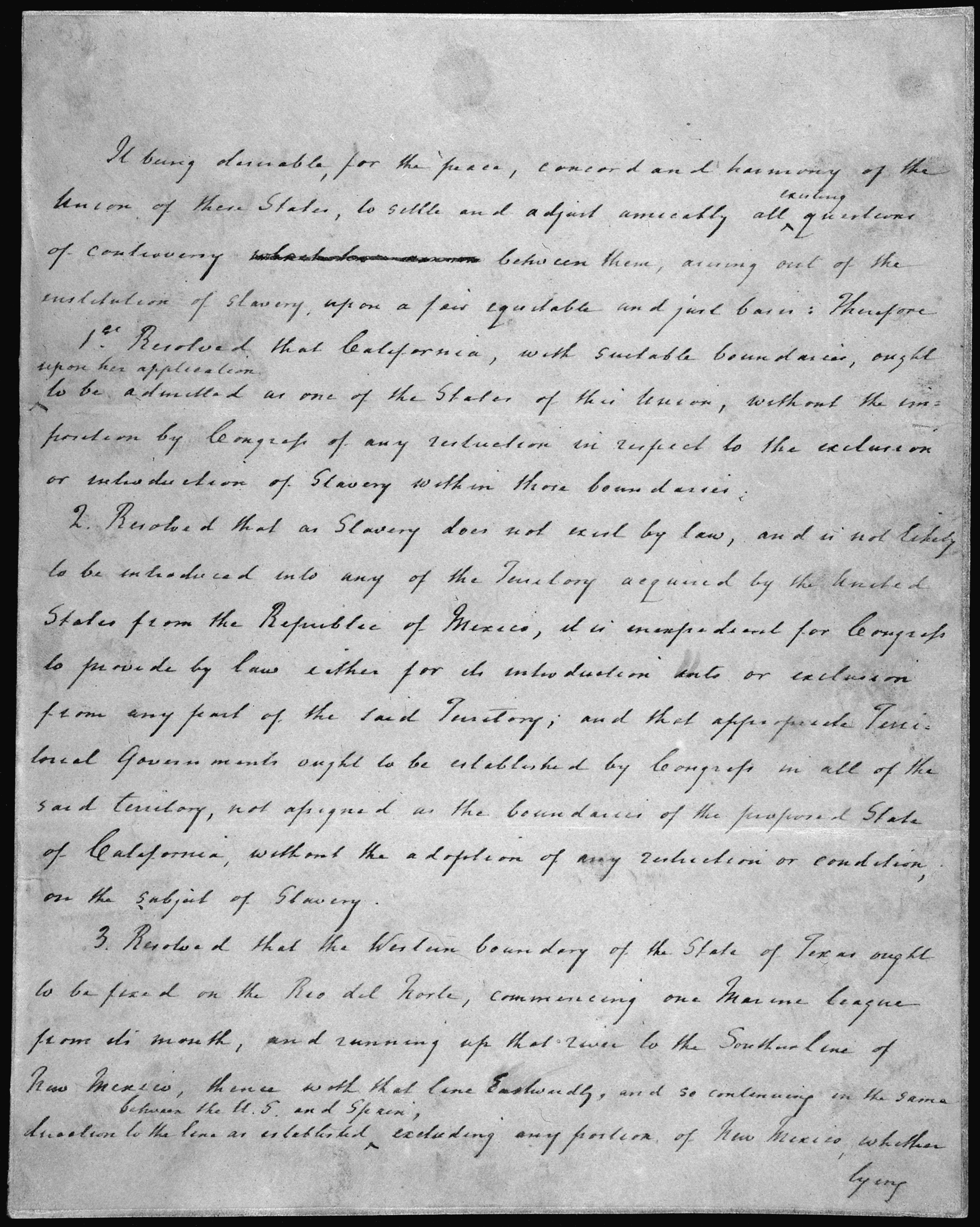
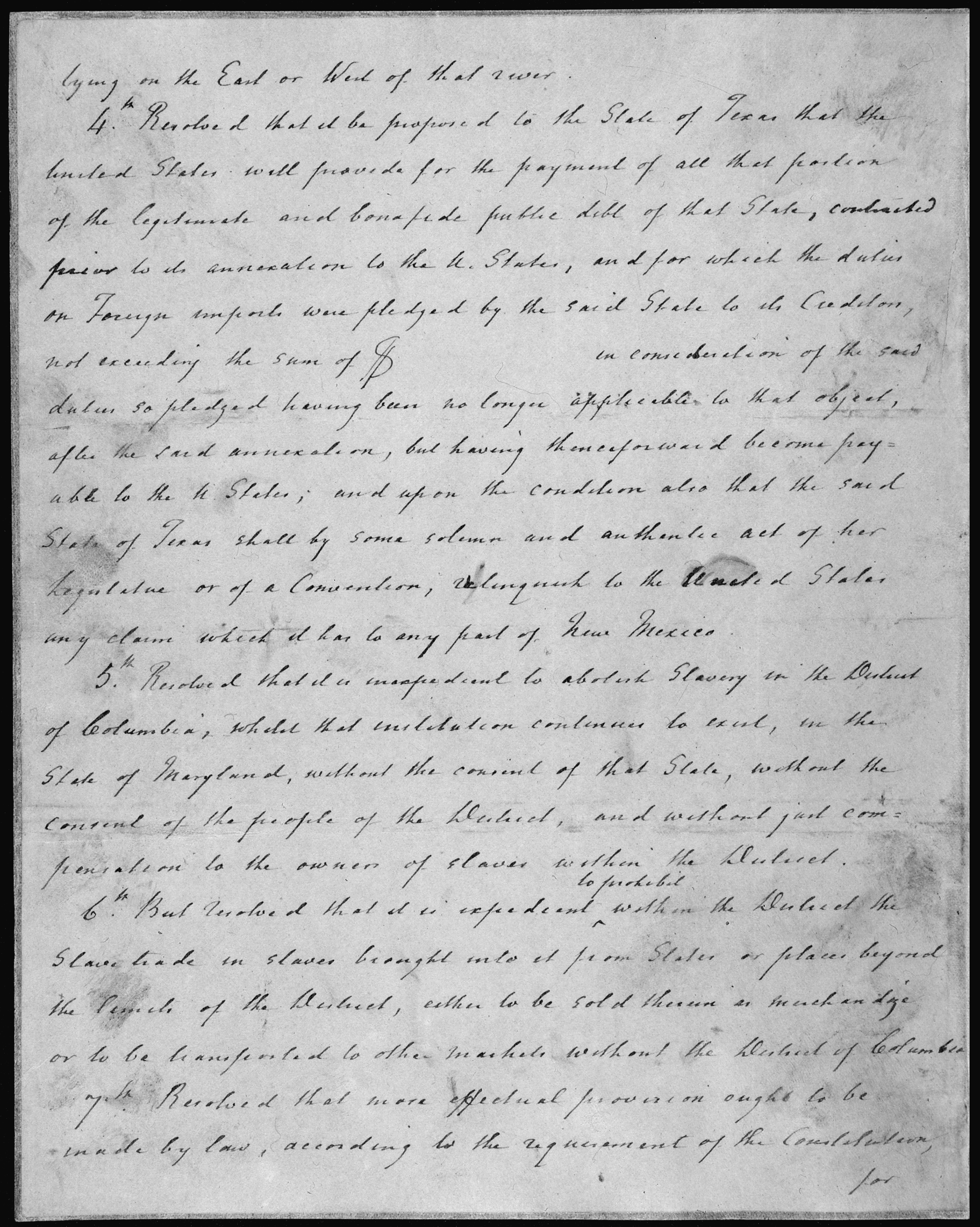
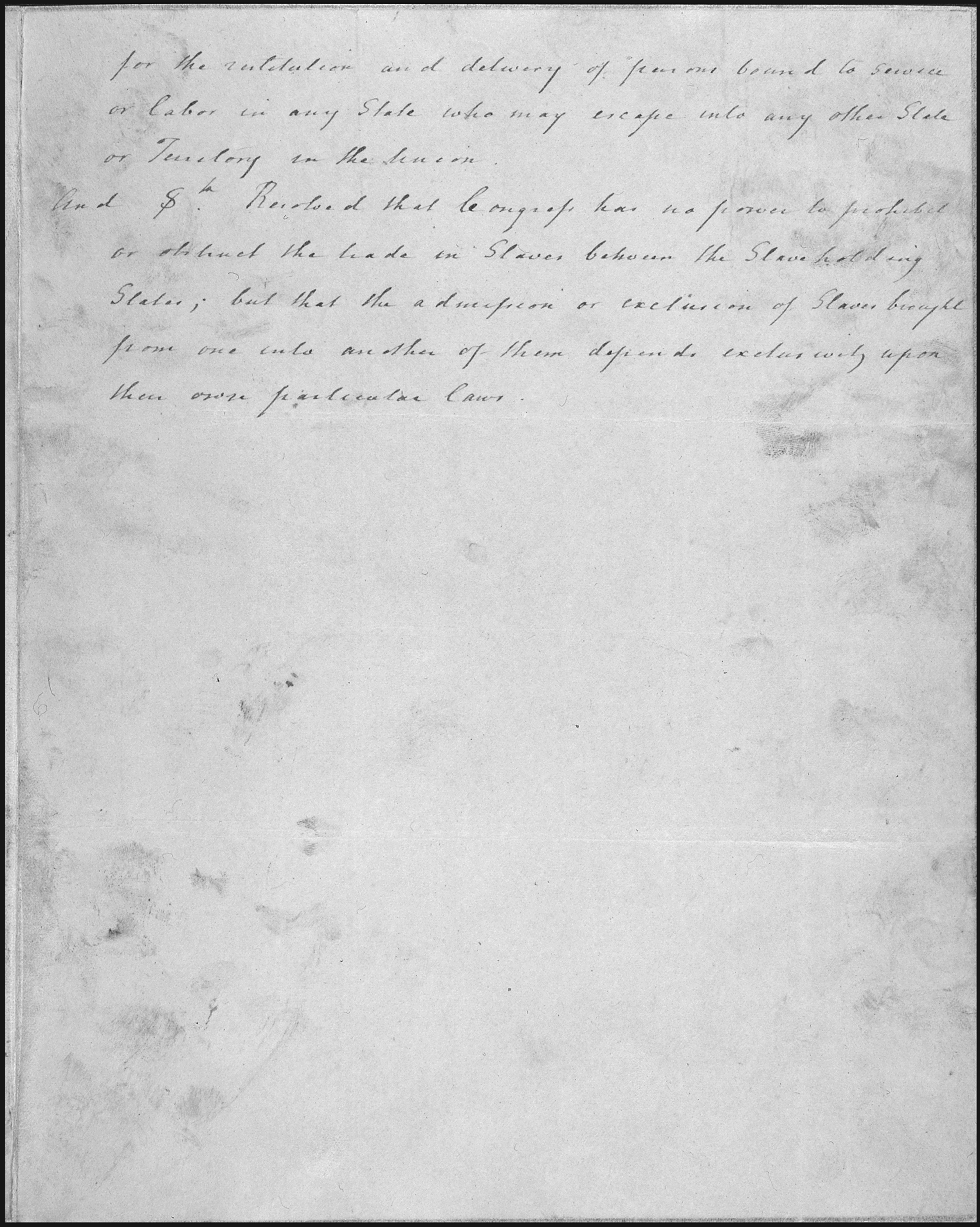
Original proposals submitted by Clay in January 1850

On January 29, 1850, Senator Henry Clay introduced a plan which combined the major issues under discussion. His legislative package of eight bills included the admission of California as a free state, the cession by Texas of some of its northern and western territorial claims in return for debt relief, the establishment of New Mexico and Utah territories, a ban on the importation of slaves into the District of Columbia for purposes of sale, and a more stringent fugitive slave law.

Clay had originally favored voting on each of his proposals separately, but Senator Henry S. Foote of Mississippi convinced him to combine the proposals regarding California's admission and the disposition of Texas's borders into one bill. Clay hoped that this combination of measures would convince House members from both North and South to support the overall package of laws even if they objected to specific provisions. Clay's proposal attracted the support of some Northern Democrats and Southern Whigs, but it lacked the backing necessary to win passage, and debate over the bill continued. Unfortunately, seven months of agonizing politicking lay ahead.

=== Opposition ===
President Taylor opposed the compromise and continued to call for immediate statehood for both California and New Mexico. Senator Calhoun and some other Southern leaders argued that the compromise was biased against the South because it would lead to the creation of new free states. Most Northern Whigs, led by William Henry Seward, who delivered his famous "Higher Law" speech during the controversy, opposed the Compromise as well because it would apply the Wilmot Proviso to the western territories and because of the pressing of ordinary citizens into duty on slave-hunting patrols. That provision was inserted by Virginia's Democratic Senator James M. Mason to entice border-state Whigs, who faced the greatest danger of losing slaves as fugitives, but were lukewarm on general sectional issues related to the South on Texas's land claims.

=== Debate and results ===
An animation showing slave and free states and territories, 1789–1861

On April 17, a "Committee of Thirteen" agreed on the border of Texas as part of Clay's plan. The dimensions were later changed. That same day, during debates on the measures in the Senate, Vice President Fillmore and Senator Benton verbally sparred, with Fillmore charging that the Missourian was "out of order." During the heated debates, floor leader Henry S. Foote of Mississippi drew a pistol on Benton.

In early June, nine slave-holding Southern states sent delegates to the Nashville Convention to determine their course of action if the compromise passed. While some delegates preached secession, the moderates ruled and proposed a series of compromises, including extending the dividing line designated by the Missouri Compromise of 1820 to the Pacific Coast.

Taylor died in July 1850 and was succeeded by Vice President Fillmore, who had privately come to support Clay's proposal. The various bills were initially combined into one "omnibus" bill. Despite Clay's efforts, the bill failed in a crucial vote on July 31, opposed by southern Democrats and by northern Whigs. The next day, Clay announced on the Senate floor that he intended to pass each part of the bill. The 73-year-old Clay, however, was physically exhausted due to the effects of tuberculosis, which would eventually kill him. Clay left the Senate to recuperate in Newport, Rhode Island, and Senator Stephen A. Douglas took the lead in attempting to pass Clay's proposals through the Senate.

Fillmore, anxious to find a quick solution to the conflict in Texas over the border with New Mexico, which threatened to become an armed conflict between Texas militia and the federal soldiers, reversed the administration's position late in July and threw its support behind the compromise measures. At the same time, Fillmore denied Texas's claims to New Mexico, asserting that the United States had promised to protect the territorial integrity of New Mexico in the Treaty of Guadalupe Hidalgo. Fillmore's forceful response helped convince Texas's U.S. Senators, Sam Houston and Thomas Jefferson Rusk, to support Stephen Douglas's compromise.

With their support, a Senate bill providing for a final settlement of Texas's borders won passage days after Fillmore delivered his message. Under the terms of the bill, the U.S. would assume Texas's debts, while Texas's northern border was set at the 36° 30' parallel north (the Missouri Compromise line), and much of its western border followed the 103rd meridian. The bill attracted the support of a bipartisan coalition of Whigs and Democrats from both sections, though most opposition to the bill came from the South. The Senate quickly moved on to the other major issues, passing bills that provided for the admission of California, the organization of New Mexico Territory, and the establishment of a new fugitive slave law.

The debate then moved to the House of Representatives, where Fillmore, Senators Webster and Douglas, Representative Linn Boyd, and Speaker of the House Howell Cobb took the lead in convincing members to support the compromise bills that had been passed in the Senate. The Senate's proposed settlement of the Texas-New Mexico boundary faced intense opposition from many Southerners, as well as from some Northerners who believed that Texas did not deserve monetary compensation. After a series of close votes that nearly delayed consideration of the issue, the House voted to approve a Texas bill similar to that which had been passed by the Senate. Following that vote, the House and the Senate quickly agreed on each of the major issues, including the banning of the slave trade in Washington. The president quickly signed each bill into law save for the Fugitive Slave Act of 1850; he ultimately signed that law as well after Attorney General Crittenden assured him that the law was constitutional. Though some in Texas still favored sending a military expedition into New Mexico, in November 1850, the state legislature voted to accept the compromise.

== Provisions ==
The general solution that was adopted by the Compromise of 1850 was to transfer a considerable part of the territory claimed by Texas state to the federal government; to organize two new territories formally, the Territory of New Mexico and the Territory of Utah, which expressly would be allowed to locally determine whether they would become slave or free territories, to add another free state to the Union (California), to adopt a severe measure to recover slaves who had escaped to a free state or free territory (the Fugitive Slave Law); and to abolish the slave trade in the District of Columbia. A key provision of each of the laws respectively organizing the Territory of New Mexico and the Territory of Utah was that slavery would be decided by local option, called popular sovereignty. That was an important repudiation of the idea behind the failure to prohibit slavery in any territory acquired from Mexico. However, the admission of California as a free state meant that Southerners were giving up their goal of a coast-to-coast belt of slave states.

=== Settlement of borders ===
Map of New Mexico Territory in 1852

The Utah Territory is shown in blue and outlined in black. The boundaries of the provisional State of Deseret are shown with a dotted line.

Texas was allowed to keep the following portions of the disputed land: south of the 32nd parallel and south of the 36°30' parallel north and east of the 103rd meridian west. The rest of the disputed land was transferred to the United States. The final border was designed to keep the frontier settlement of El Paso in Texas, since despite that settlement's geographic, historic, and economic ties to New Mexico, Texas had recently established a county government in El Paso and thus successfully claimed it as an integral part of Texas. A similar attempt to keep Santa Fe in Texas failed, and Santa Fe became part of the New Mexico territory. The United States Constitution (Article IV, Section 3) does not permit Congress unilaterally to reduce the territory of any state, so the first part of the Compromise of 1850 had to take the form of an offer to the Texas State Legislature, rather than a unilateral enactment. This ratified the bargain and, in due course, the transfer of a broad swath of land from the state of Texas to the federal government was accomplished. In return for Texas's giving up this land, the United States assumed the debts of Texas.

From the Mexican Cession, the New Mexico Territory received most of the present-day state of Arizona, most of the western part of the present-day state of New Mexico, and the southern tip of present-day Nevada (south of the 37th parallel). The territory also received most of present-day eastern New Mexico, a portion of present-day Colorado (east of the crest of the Rocky Mountains, west of the 103rd meridian, and south of the 38th parallel); all of this land had been claimed by Texas.

From the Mexican Cession, the Utah Territory received present-day Utah, most of present-day Nevada (everything north of the 37th parallel), a major part of present-day Colorado (everything west of the crest of the Rocky Mountains), and a small part of present-day Wyoming. That included the newly founded colony at Salt Lake, of Brigham Young. The Utah Territory also received some land that had been claimed by Texas; this land is now part of present-day Colorado that is east of the crest of the Rocky Mountains.

=== Fugitive Slave Act ===
Perhaps the most important part of the Compromise received the least attention during debates. Enacted September 18, 1850, it is informally known as the Fugitive Slave Law, or the Fugitive Slave Act. It bolstered the Fugitive Slave Act of 1793. The new version of the Fugitive Slave Law now required federal judicial officials in all states and federal territories, including free states, to assist with the return of escaped slaves to their masters in slave states. Any federal marshal or other official who did not arrest an alleged runaway slave was liable to a fine of $1,000 (equivalent to $38,700 in 2025). Law enforcement everywhere in the US now had a duty to arrest anyone suspected of being a fugitive slave on no more evidence than a claimant's sworn testimony of ownership. Suspected slaves could neither ask for a jury trial nor testify on their own behalf. Also, aiding a runaway slave by providing food or shelter was now a crime nationwide, punished by six months' imprisonment and a $1,000 fine. Officers capturing a fugitive slave were entitled to a fee for their work, and this expense was to be paid by the Federal Government.

The law was so completely pro-slavery as to prohibit the admission of the testimony of a person accused of being an escaped slave into evidence at the judicial hearing to determine the status of the accused escaped slave. Thus, if free blacks were claimed to be escaped slaves, they could not resist their return to slavery (or enslavement for the first time) by truthfully telling their actual history. Furthermore, the federal commissioners overseeing the hearings were paid $5 for ruling that a person was free, but were paid $10 for determining that a person was a slave, thus providing a financial incentive to rule in favor of slavery regardless of the evidence. The law further exacerbated the problem of free blacks being kidnapped and sold as slaves.

The Fugitive Slave Act was essential to meet Southern demands. In terms of public opinion in the North, the critical provision was that ordinary citizens were required to aid slave catchers and that it was a crime to assist a fugitive. Many Northerners deeply resented these provisions. The violent process of returning slaves to the South made the act abhorrent to many Northerners. Resentment towards the Act further heightened tensions between the North and South, which were then inflamed further by abolitionists such as Harriet Beecher Stowe. Her novel, Uncle Tom's Cabin, stressed the horrors of recapturing escaped slaves and outraged Southerners.

=== End of slave trade in District of Columbia ===
A statute enacted as part of the compromise prohibited the slave trade in Washington, D.C., but not slave ownership. Southerners in Congress, alarmed and outraged, were unanimous in opposing the provision, seen as a concession to the abolitionists and a bad precedent, but they were outvoted. However, Washington's residents could still easily buy and sell slaves in the nearby states of Virginia and Maryland.

== Implications ==
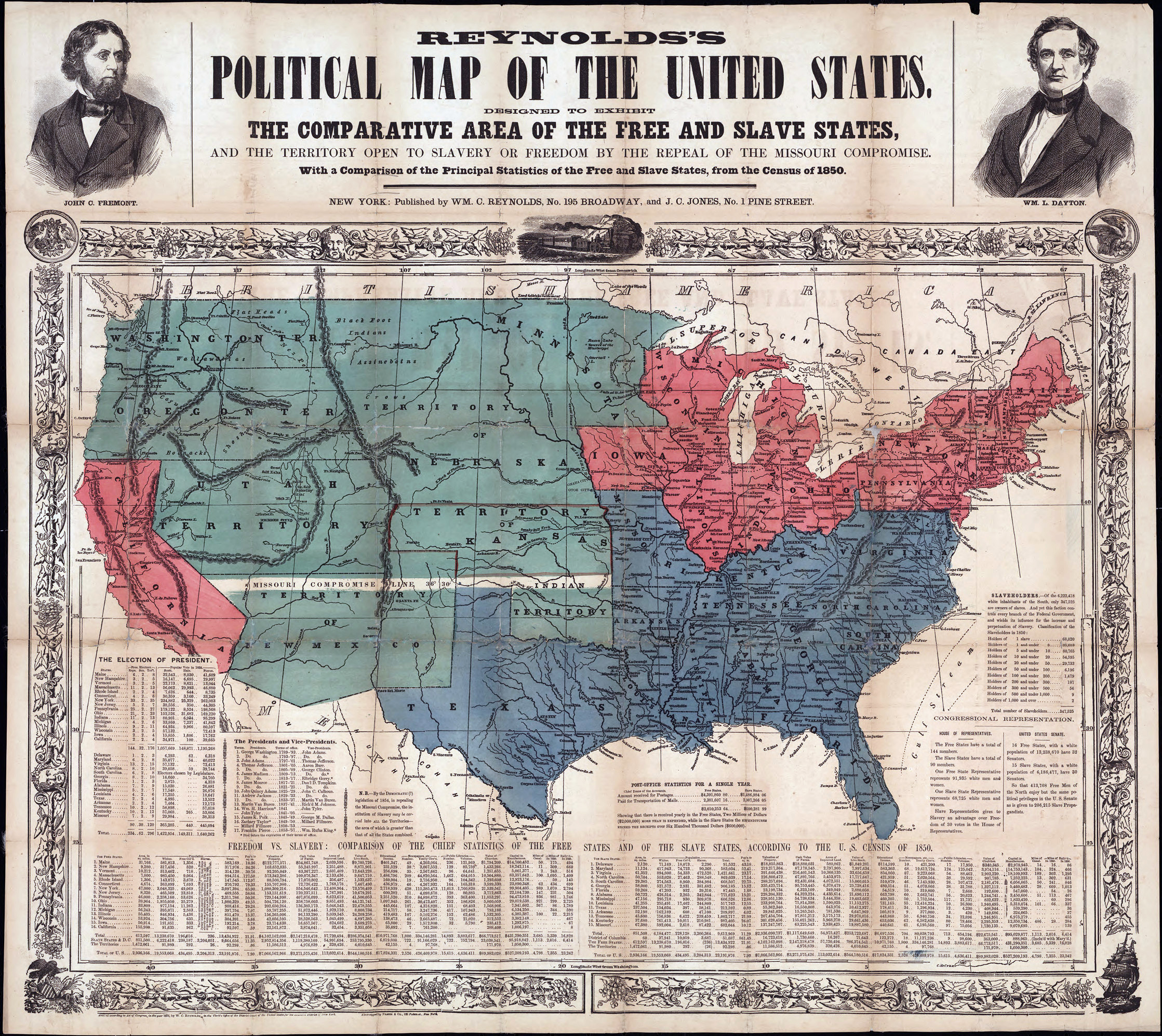
Map of free and slave states c. 1856

Passage of the Compromise of 1850, as it came to be known, caused celebration in Washington and elsewhere, with crowds shouting, "The Union is saved!" Fillmore himself described the Compromise of 1850 as a "final settlement" of sectional issues, though the future of slavery in New Mexico and Utah remained unclear. The admission of new states, or the organization of territories in the remaining unorganized portion of the Louisiana Purchase, could also potentially reopen the polarizing debate over slavery.

Not all accepted the Compromise of 1850. Longing for the former national influence of the South, a South Carolina newspaper wrote, "the Rubicon is passed ... and the Southern States are now vassals in this Confederacy." (This was not referring to the then-future Confederate States of America; many, especially in the South, still considered the United States a confederacy at the time.) Many Northerners, meanwhile, were displeased by the Fugitive Slave Act. The debate over slavery in the territories would be re-opened in 1854 through the Kansas–Nebraska Act. It continued throughout the late 1850s, which culminated in one of the more well-known debates over slavery, the Lincoln-Douglas debates.

Historian David M. Potter argues that the Compromise of 1850 was not actually a compromise at all.

If a compromise is an agreement between adversaries, by which each consents to certain terms desired by the other, and if the majority vote of a section is necessary to register the consent of that section, then it must be said that North and South did not consent to each other's terms, and that there was really no compromise – a truce, perhaps, an armistice, certainly a settlement, but not a true compromise. Still, after four years of deadlock, any positive action seemed a great accomplishment.

In hindsight, the Compromise merely postponed the American Civil War for a decade, contrary to the expectations of many at the time, who felt the issue of slavery had finally been settled. During that decade, the Whig Party completely broke down, to be replaced with the new Republican Party dominant in the North, while Democrats reigned in the South.

Others argue that the Compromise only made the pre-existing sectional divisions more obvious, and laid the groundwork for future conflict. They view the Fugitive Slave Law as helping to polarize the US, as shown in the enormous reaction to Harriet Beecher Stowe's novel Uncle Tom's Cabin. The passage of the Fugitive Slave Law aroused feelings of bitterness in the North. Furthermore, the consequences of the Compromise of 1850 led to a breakdown in the spirit of compromise in the Antebellum period. The deaths of influential senators who worked on the compromise, primarily Henry Clay and Daniel Webster, also contributed to the feeling of increasing disparity between the North and South.

The delay of hostilities for ten years allowed the Northern states to continue to industrialize. The Southern states, largely based on slave labor and cash crop production, lacked the ability to industrialize heavily.

According to historian Mark Stegmaier, "The Fugitive Slave Act, the abolition of the slave trade in the District of Columbia, the admission of California as a free state, and even the application of the formula of popular sovereignty to the territories were all less important than the least remembered component of the Compromise of 1850—the statute by which Texas relinquished its claims to much of New Mexico in return for federal assumption of the debts."

== Other proposals ==
Proposals in 1846 to 1850 on the division of the Southwest included the following (some of which are not mutually exclusive):

- The Wilmot Proviso banning slavery in any new territory to be acquired from Mexico, not including Texas, which had been annexed the previous year. It passed the House in August 1846 and February 1847, but not the Senate. Later, an effort failed to attach the proviso to the Treaty of Guadalupe Hidalgo.
- The Extension of the Missouri Compromise line was proposed by failed amendments to the Wilmot Proviso by William W. Wick and then Stephen Douglas to extend the Missouri Compromise line (36°30' parallel north) west to the Pacific (south of Carmel-by-the-Sea, California) to allow the possibility of slavery in most of present-day New Mexico and Arizona, and southern California. That line was again proposed by the Nashville Convention of June 1850.
- Popular sovereignty, developed by Lewis Cass and Stephen Douglas as the position of the Democratic Party, was to let the (white male) residents of each territory decide by vote whether to allow slavery. It was implemented in the Kansas–Nebraska Act of 1854, giving rise to the violence of the "Bleeding Kansas" period.
- William L. Yancey's "Alabama Platform", endorsed by the Alabama and the Georgia legislatures and by Democratic state conventions in Florida and Virginia, called for no restrictions on slavery in the territories by the federal government or territorial governments before statehood, opposition to any candidates supporting either the Wilmot Proviso or popular sovereignty, and federal legislation to overrule Mexican anti-slavery laws.
- Two free states were proposed by Zachary Taylor, who served as president from March 1849 to July 1850. As President, he proposed that the entire area become two free states, called California and New Mexico but much larger than the ones today. None of the area would be left as an unorganized or organized territory, which would avoid the question of slavery in the territories.
- Changing Texas's borders was proposed by Senator Thomas Hart Benton in December 1849 or January 1850. Texas's western and northern boundaries would be the 102nd meridian west and the 34th parallel north.
- Two southern states were proposed by Senator John Bell, with the assent of Texas, in February 1850. New Mexico would get all Texas land north of the 34th parallel north, including today's Texas Panhandle, while the area to the south, including the southeastern part of today's New Mexico, would be divided at the Colorado River of Texas into two Southern states, balancing the admission of California and New Mexico as free states.
- The first draft of the compromise of 1850 had Texas's northwestern boundary be a straight, diagonal line from the Rio Grande 20 miles north of El Paso to the Red River (Mississippi watershed) at the 100th meridian west, the southwestern corner of today's Oklahoma.

== See also ==
- Timeline of events leading to the American Civil War
- Missouri Compromise
- Kansas–Nebraska Act
- Bibliography of Zachary Taylor
- Bibliography of Millard Fillmore
