= Sophia Dallas =

Second Lady of the United States

Second Lady of the United States
- In role March 4, 1845 – March 4, 1849
- Vice President: George M. Dallas
- Preceded by: Letitia Tyler
- Succeeded by: Abigail Fillmore

First Lady of Philadelphia
- In office October 21, 1828 – April 15, 1829
- Preceded by: Harriet Snowden
- Succeeded by: Sarah Ann Lippincott

Personal details
- Born: Sophia Chew Nicklin; June 24, 1798 Philadelphia, Pennsylvania, U.S.
- Died: January 11, 1869 (aged 70) Philadelphia, Pennsylvania, U.S.
- Resting place: St. Peter's Episcopal Church, Society Hill, Philadelphia
- Party: Democratic
- Spouse: George Dallas (m. 1816; died 1864)
- Children: 8

Sophia Chew Nicklin Dallas (née Nicklin; June 24, 1798 – January 11, 1869) was the wife of Vice President George Mifflin Dallas, and thus second lady of the United States from 1845 to 1849. She was the daughter of Philadelphia merchant Philip Nicklin and Julianna Nicklin (née Chew), and the granddaughter of Benjamin Chew.

George and Sophia Dallas wed in 1816 and had eight children. Dallas held a disliking for Washington, D.C., and during her husband's term as vice president she remained mostly in Philadelphia except for occasional visits to the capital.

Honorary titles
Vacant Title last held by Letitia Tyler	Second Lady of the United States; 1845–1849	Vacant Title next held by Abigail Fillmore
