= Millard =

Millard may refer to:

== Places in the United States ==
- Millard, Missouri, a village
- Millard, Omaha, Nebraska, a former town and present-day neighborhood of Omaha
  - Millard Public Schools, a school district in Omaha, Nebraska, US
- Millard Creek, Pennsylvania
- Millard County, Utah
- Millard, Virginia, an unincorporated community
- Millard, Wisconsin, an unincorporated community

== Schools ==
- Millard's Preparatory School, a now-defunct military preparatory school in Washington, D.C.

== People and fictional characters ==
- Millard (surname)
- Millard (given name), a list of people and fictional characters
- a nickname of Glenn McGrath (born 1970), Australian former cricketer

== See also ==
- Milliard, one thousand million
