= Cottage furniture =

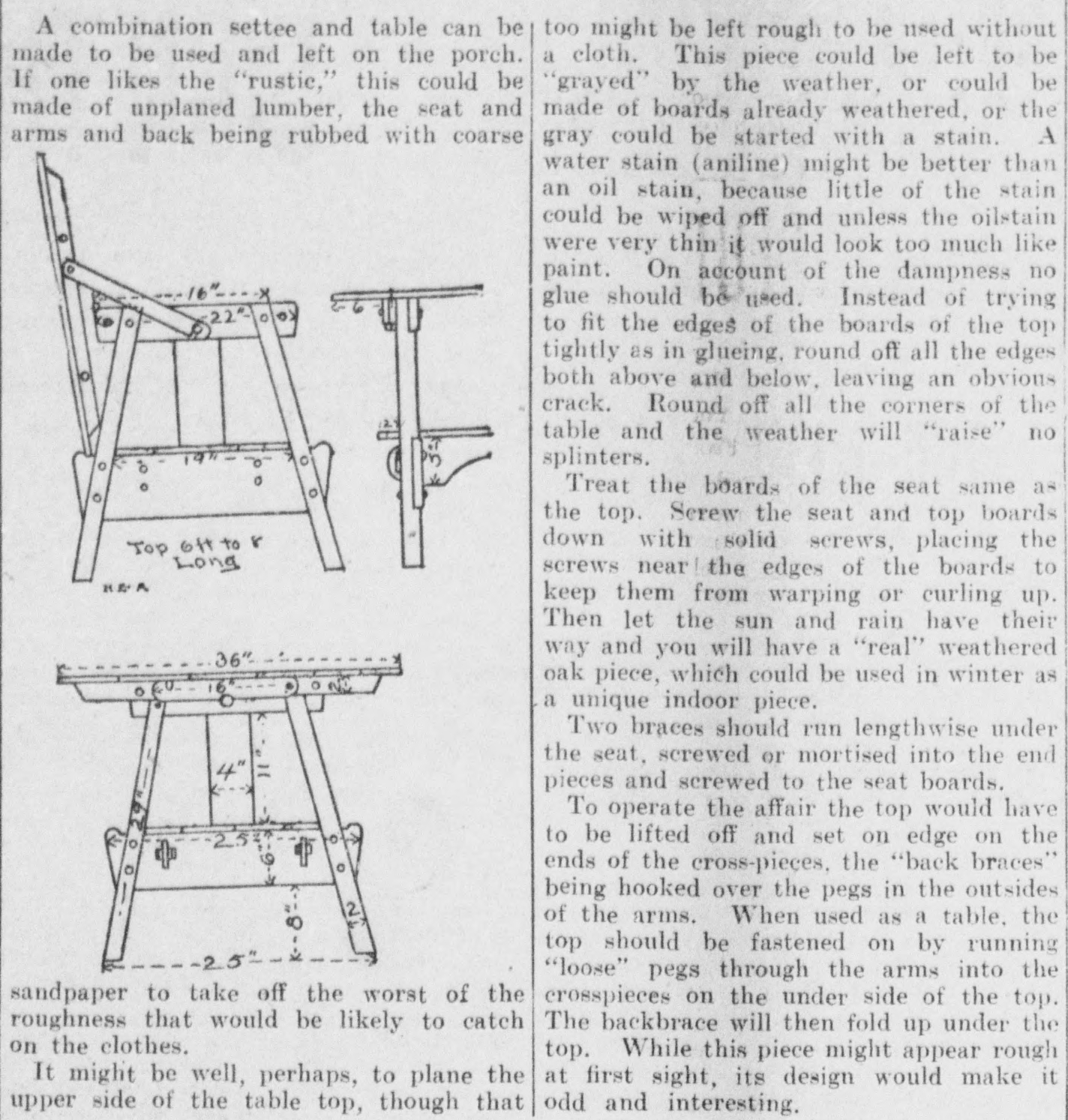
Designs for homemade cottage furniture - settee

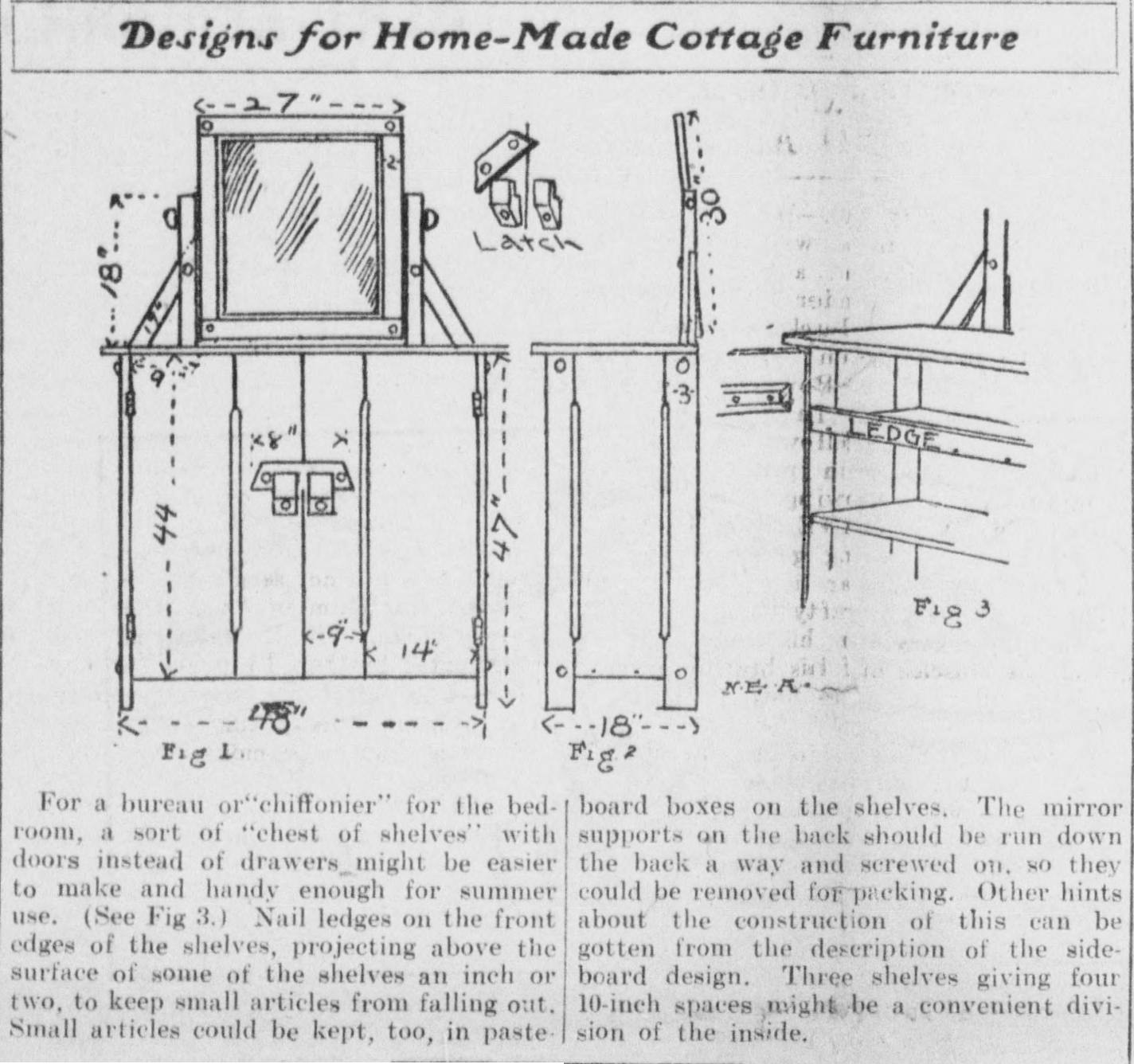
Designs for homemade cottage furniture - chiffonier

Cottage furniture was popular in the United States, particularly on the East Coast of the United States, between 1830 and 1890. As the American Civil War began winding down and luxury items were once again sought after, cottage furniture began appearing in workshops and then homes of the wealthy in places like Martha's Vineyard, Cape May, and the Berkshires. Due to their popularity, these items would not remain exclusive to the upper-class; soon, simpler but equally elegant versions could be found in homes all along the East Coast, particularly New England and Pennsylvania.

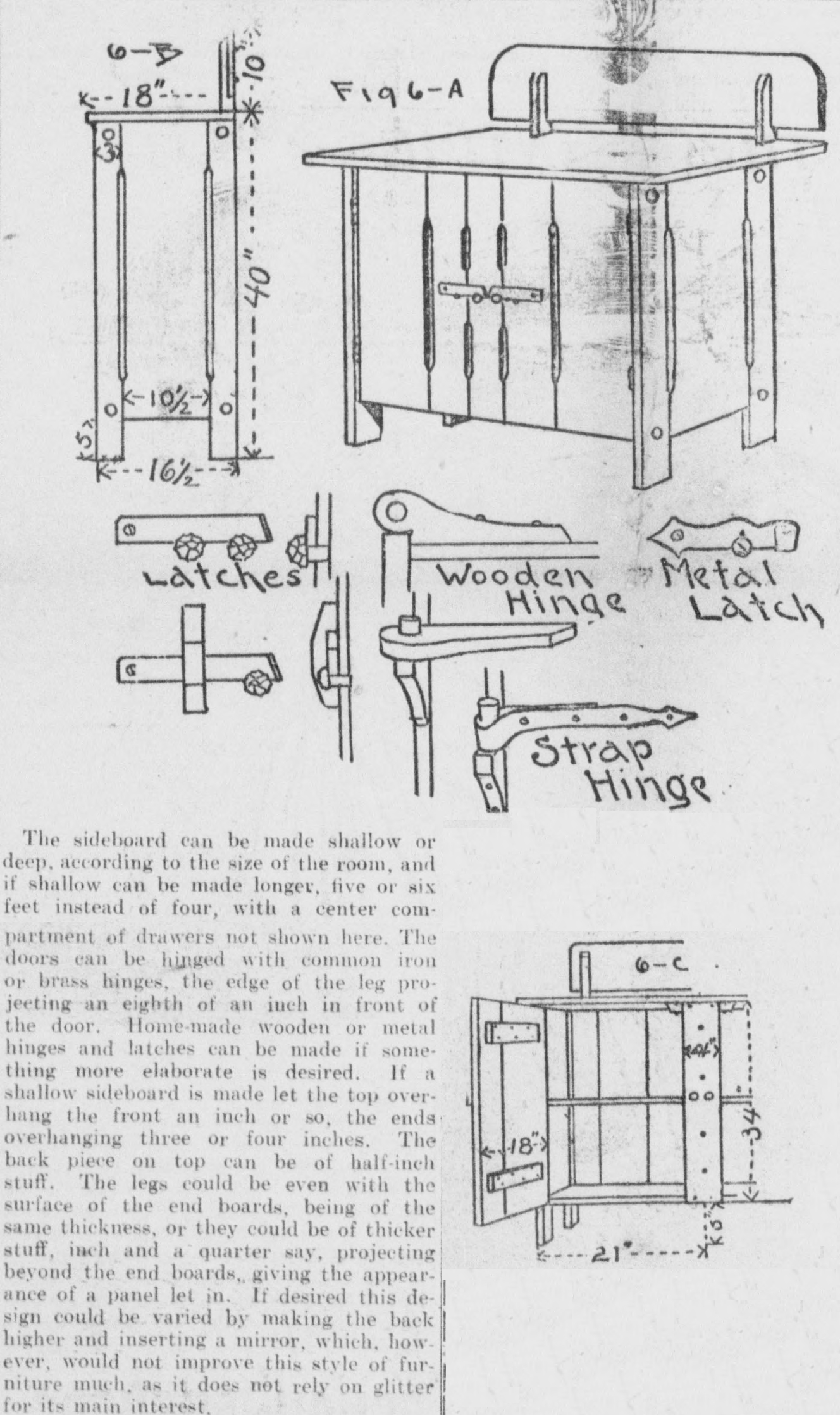
Designs for Home-Made Cottage Furniture - sideboard

These pieces primarily came in the form of "suites", that is, coordinating sets of furniture consisting of a double bed, a washstand, a dresser or vanity with an attached mirror, a small table, some coordinating chairs, and sometimes a chifforobe or wardrobe.

Cottage furniture is true to the Victorian style in that the beds have high (an excess of six feet or more) and lavishly decorated headboards. There is some carving, usually in the form of finials and medallions, but most of the decoration was painted. Flowers, fruit, and other plants were the most common motifs featuring a large painted bouquet-like medallion in a central panel on the headboard and a smaller, matching one on the foot-board. Because the pieces were done by local cabinet makers, most of which did not have any formal training in still life or landscape painting, the embellishments usually have a slightly primitive, Folk Art feel to them. Some, however, had highly detailed and beautifully executed scenes such as sailing ships or local wildlife. All the pieces of furniture were painted and shared the same embellishments. The most popular base colors were tan, blues, greens, and pinks, though there are a few rare examples where the natural wood is varnished but left unpainted with the exception of the painted floral accents. Restoration of Cottage furniture is difficult in the extreme, tops of pieces were rarely painted in detail for this express reason.
