= Millard, Virginia =

Unincorporated community in Virginia, United States

Coordinates: 37°07′58″N 82°23′11″W

Millard is an unincorporated community in Dickenson County, Virginia, United States.

== History ==
A post office was established at Millard in 1903, and remained in operation until it was discontinued in 1958. The community was named for Millard Rose, a local resident.
