= Milliard (surname) =

Milliard is a surname of French origin. Notable people with the surname include:

- Charles Milliard (born 1979), Canadian-Quebec politician
- Ralph Milliard (born 1973), Dutch baseball player
- Victor Milliard (1844–1921), French politician

== See also ==
- Millard (surname)
