= Millard Powers Fillmore =

American lawyer (1828–1889)

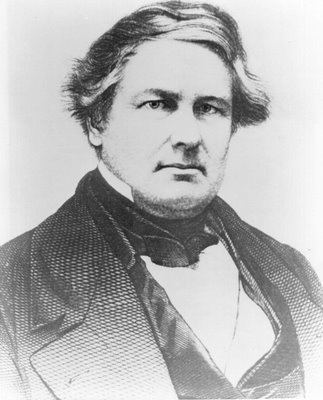

Private Secretary to the President
- In office July 9, 1850 – March 4, 1853
- President: Millard Fillmore
- Preceded by: William Wallace Smith Bliss
- Succeeded by: Sidney Webster

Personal details
- Born: April 25, 1828 Aurora, New York, U.S.
- Died: November 15, 1889 (aged 61) Buffalo, New York, U.S.
- Resting place: Forest Lawn Cemetery, Buffalo, New York
- Parent(s): Millard Fillmore (Father); Abigail Powers (Mother)
- Relatives: Mary Abigail Fillmore (Sister)
- Education: Harvard University
- Occupation: Lawyer

Millard Powers Fillmore (April 25, 1828 – November 15, 1889) was an American lawyer. He was the eldest of two children, and only son, of U.S. President Millard Fillmore and his first wife, Abigail Powers.

== Early life ==
Millard Powers Fillmore, known familiarly as "Powers", was born on April 25, 1828, in Aurora, New York to Millard Fillmore (1800–1874) and his first wife, Abigail Powers (1798–1853). In 1828, the year he was born, his father was elected to the New York State Assembly as a member of the Anti-Masonic Party. His maternal grandparents were Reverend Lemuel Powers Jr., a Baptist minister, and Abigail Newland-Powers. His paternal grandparents were Phoebe Millard Fillmore and Nathaniel Fillmore Jr., a farmer. His maternal great-grandparents in part of his maternal grandfather, were Lt. Lemuel Powers Sr. and Thankful Powers. In part of his maternal grandmother, were Joseph Newland and Abigail Newland Powers Strong. His paternal great-grandparents in part of his paternal grandfather, were Lt. Nathaniel Fillmore Sr. and Hebzibah Fillmore. In part of his paternal grandmother, were Dr. Abiathar Millard Fillmore and Tabitha Millard Fillmore. His sister was Mary Abigail Fillmore.

== Career ==
He studied law in his father's office and graduated from Harvard Law School in 1849. He served as his father's private secretary during the latter's presidency. After practicing law in Buffalo, New York as the partner of E. Carleton Sprague, he was appointed a federal court clerk.

== Personal life ==
After the death of his mother in 1853 at the age of 55, his father married Caroline Carmichael McIntosh; a union which Millard Powers Fillmore reportedly never accepted. Following his father's death in 1874 at age 74, he engaged in a bitter battle with his stepmother over the terms of his late father's will, which young Millard won.

Millard Powers Fillmore never married and had no children, so he was his father's last surviving descendant. He died of apoplexy in Buffalo on November 15, 1889, at the age of 61. Fillmore was buried at Forest Lawn Cemetery in Buffalo. His will directed that all his family correspondence (including that with his father) be burned, the motive for which was the subject of much speculation.
