= Caroline Millward House =

Historic house in Illinois, United States

- U.S. National Register of Historic Places
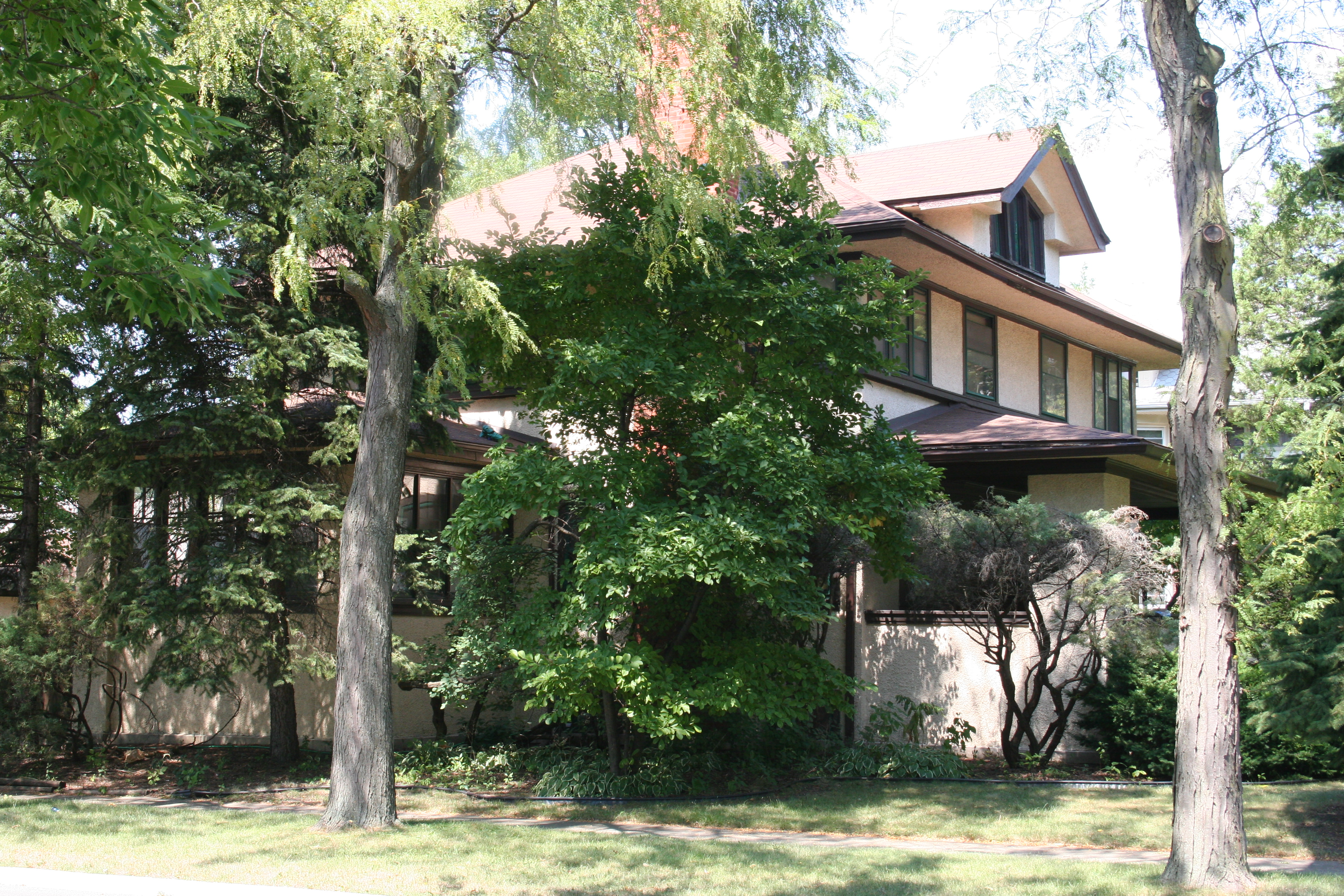

- Location within Chicago metropolitan area Location within Illinois Location within the United States
- Location: 502 N. 5th Ave., Maywood, Illinois
- Coordinates: 41°53′31″N 87°50′22″W
- Area: less than one acre
- Built: c. 1906
- Architectural style: American Foursquare, Prairie School
- MPS: Maywood MPS
- NRHP reference No.: 92000493
- Added to NRHP: May 22, 1992

The Caroline Millward House is a historic house at 502 N. 5th Avenue in Maywood, Illinois. The house was built circa 1906 for owner Caroline Millward. It has an American Foursquare design, a simplified style popular in the early twentieth century, with Prairie School elements. The 2 1/2-story house has a typical Foursquare layout, with a rectangular shape, a front porch supported by wide piers, a glazed porch on one side, and a hip roof with a front-facing dormer. The horizontal emphasis of the design is typical of the Prairie School, as are its bands of windows, wood trim, overhanging eaves, and built-in furniture.

The house was added to the National Register of Historic Places on May 22, 1992.
