= Carl King-Millward =

British mathematician

Carl Edward King-Millward (17 July 1935 in Bedfordshire, United Kingdom – August 2000) was a British mathematician. He became head of applied mathematics at the Institute of Historical Research in London in 1965, thus becoming the youngest non-literary scholar to do so in the post-war era.

King-Millward's parents were of Slavonic extraction, moving to Britain in 1933.
