= Helen Aldrich De Kroyft =

Helen De Kroyft
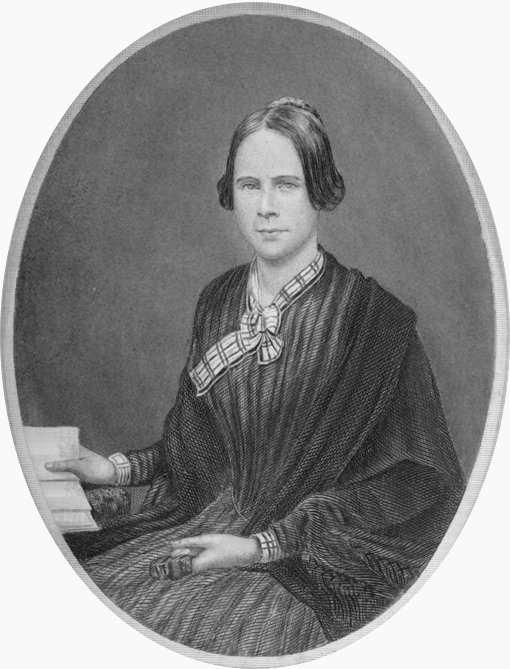
- Born: Susan Helen Aldrich; October 29, 1818; Rochester, New York, U.S.
- Died: October 1915 (aged 96–97); Dansvllle, New York, U.S.
- Education: Genesee Wesleyan Seminary; New York Institution for the Blind
- Occupation: author
- Spouse: William De Kroyft (m. 1846; died 1846)

Susan Helen Aldrich De Kroyft (née, Aldrich; October 29, 1818 – October 1915) was an American author. Becoming blind less than a month after being widowed, for the next 48 years, De Kroyft traveled and wrote books. Principally her own publisher, the work that she prepared was dictated to a companion.

== Early life and education ==
Helen Aldrich was born in Rochester, New York, on October 29, 1818. She was the daughter of Obed and Melintha Hart (Potter) Aldrich, and was the oldest in a family of twelve children. She was a seventh-generation descendant of the Quaker George Aldrich, who came to the United States in 1630.

Early in her life, her father, Obed, lost a great deal of money by "endorsing for a friend".

De Kroyft attended Westfield Academy in 1832–36, and Genesee Wesleyan Seminary (now Syracuse University) in Lima, New York in 1837–43, where she was a valedictorian. In 1834, at age 15, she came up with a plan regarding how to pay for her higher education. She alternated between teaching school in the winter and attending school in the summer, ultimately graduating from the university.

== Career ==
Shortly after leaving school, she married William De Kroyft, a young physician, on July 26, 1846, in Rochester. However, a carriage accident four hours after their wedding left her widowed. Less than a month later, she awoke to find herself blind from an eye infection.

Confronted now with the necessity of having to provide for herself, she entered the New York Institution for the Blind to become an organist. In a few months, however, a card invented in Paris for keeping the lines straight was placed in her hands, and in less than three years, her first work was written, entitled: A Place in Thy Memory.

Being an unknown author, no publisher wanted to bring out De Kroyft's work without being paid half the costs for a first edition. She wrote a prospectus and personally solicited subscribers in New York City, securing enough to bring out her work with two engravings, all paid. Delivering the book to her subscribers, she saw that she had in her hand the means of travel by everywhere introducing her own work. Engaging a young lady companion, De Kroyft went first, in February 1860, to Washington, D.C. Several of the New York papers announced her there, and one of the directors of the institution gave her letters to his friends, Henry Clay, Sam Houston, Mrs. Commodore Aulic, the Chaplain of the United States Senate, and so forth.

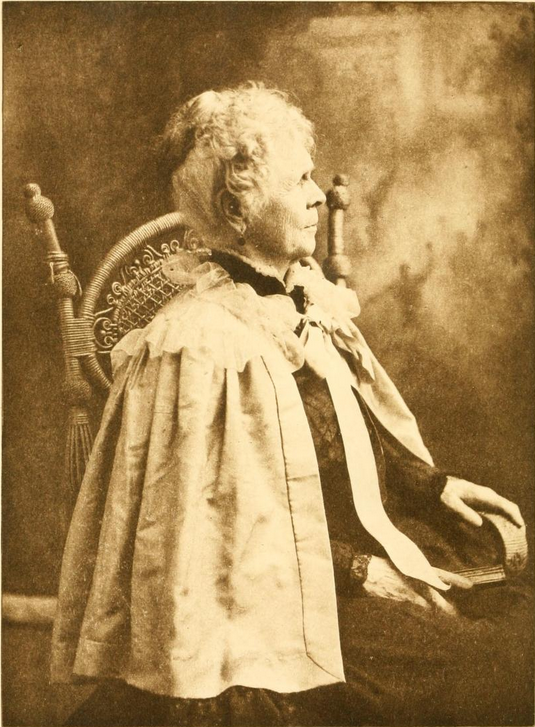
De Kroyft in 1904

In March, 1850, she left for Charleston, South Carolina with letters from these and many others, including one from President Zachary Taylor at the White House, introducing her to all his friends in the South. The following Christmas, William Hickling Prescott, the historian, presented a case of wires such as he had invented for his own use. Aided by this tool, she subsequently published four other books, besides traveling almost constantly over the U.S. and Canada, everywhere introducing her own works, one secretary having accompanied her for 28 years. De Kroyft was the author of A Place In Thy Memory (1849), The Story of Little Jakey (1871), Darwin and Moses (1875), Mortara (1888), The Foreshadowed Way (1901), and The Soul of Eve (1904). By 1902, her eyesight had slowly returned.

In religion, De Kroyft identified as Episcopalian. She was an honorary member of the Shakespeare Club in New York City.

== Death and legacy ==
De Kroyft resided in Dansvllle, New York, and died there in October 1915. The Helen Aldrich De Kroyft papers are held by the University of Rochester.

== Selected works ==
- A Place In Thy Memory, 1849
- The Story of Little Jakey, 1871
- Darwin and Moses, 1875
- Mortara, 1888
- The Foreshadowed Way, 1901
- The Soul of Eve, 1904
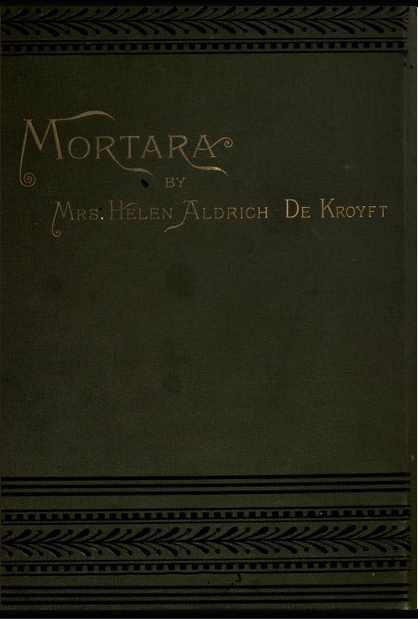
Mortara

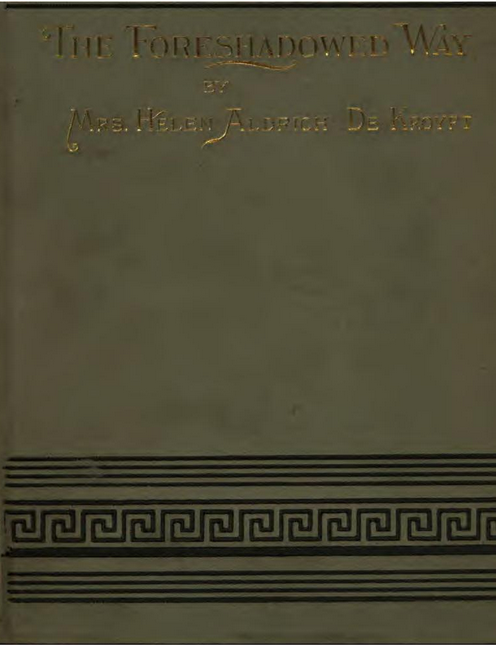
The Foreshadowed Way

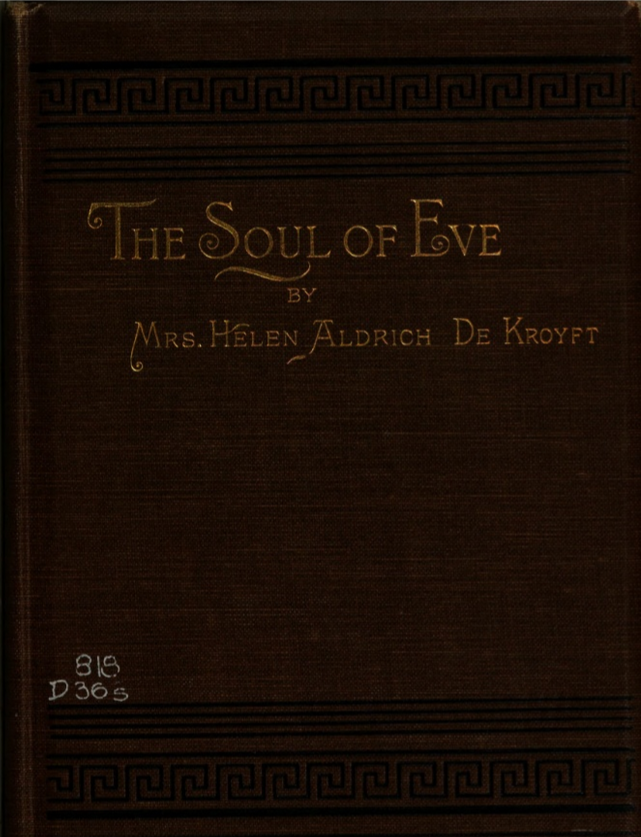
The Soul of Eve
