= Mary Abigail Fillmore =

Daughter of U.S. President Millard Fillmore

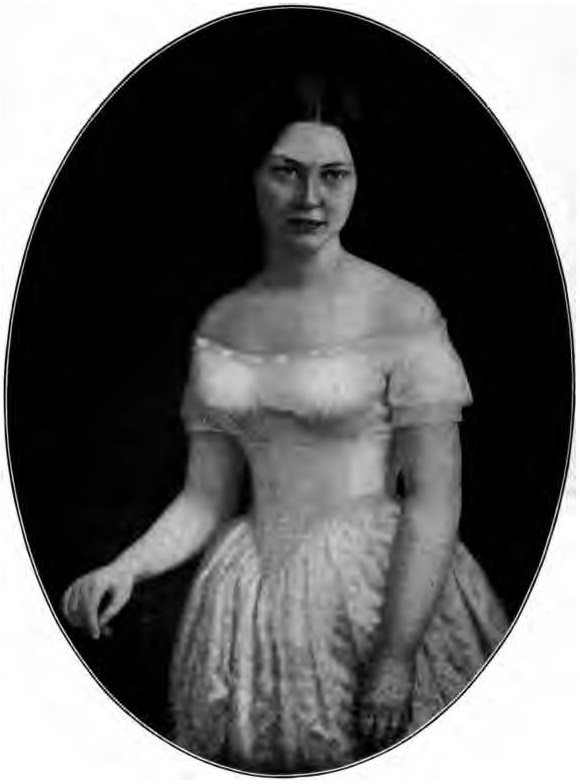
- From Volume I of 1907's Millard Fillmore Papers
- Born: Mary Abigail Fillmore; March 27, 1832; Buffalo, New York, U.S.
- Died: July 26, 1854 (aged 22); East Aurora, New York, U.S.
- Title: Acting First Lady Of The United States
- Parent(s): Millard Fillmore (Father); Abigail Powers (Mother)
- Relatives: Millard Powers Fillmore (Brother)

Mary Abigail Fillmore (March 27, 1832 – July 26, 1854) was the only daughter and the youngest child of President Millard Fillmore and Abigail Powers. During her father's presidency from 1850 to 1853 she often served as White House hostess, in part due to her mother's illness.

== Biography ==
A native of Buffalo, New York, she studied at a private school in Lenox, Massachusetts. She spoke French fluently and was conversant in Spanish, German, and Italian. She taught briefly in the Buffalo schools until her father became president in 1850.

An accomplished musician, she played the piano, harp, and guitar. While exercising the role of White House hostess she performed at White House functions.

Abigail Fillmore died 26 days after Fillmore's presidency ended, and Mary took over the management of her father's household. She accompanied him to a variety of public functions, notably including the widely promoted train and steamboat Grand Excursion of June 1854.

Her sudden death a few weeks later, from cholera at age 22, is thought to have contributed to her father's decision to come out of retirement and resume his political career.
