= Milward (name) =

Milward is an English occupational surname and a masculine given name. A variant spelling of Millward, it is formed from mill and ward, meaning mill-keeper or miller.

Notable people with the name include:

== Surname ==
- Alan Milward (1935–2010), British economic historian
- Alf Milward (1870–1941), English footballer
- Alfred Milward (1870–1941), British professional footballer
- Edward Milward (1712?–1757), English physician and historian of medicine
- Evan Milward (born 1984), Canadian former soccer player
- George Milward Boyd, Canadian politician
- Gregory Milward (born 1985), British radio DJ, television presenter and author
- John Freeman Milward Dovaston (1782–1854), British poet and naturalist
- John Milward (1599–1670), English parliamentary diarist
- Malcolm Milward (born 1948), English cricketer
- Marguerite Milward (1873–1953), British sculptor and anthropologist
- Michelle Milward (born 1986), Australia international rugby union player
- Neil Milward Forster (1927–2006), British field hockey player
- Peter Milward (1925–2017), British Jesuit priest and literary scholar
- Richard Milward (born 1984), English novelist
- Richard Milward (priest) (1609–1680), British priest
- Simon Milward (1965–2005), General Secretary of the Federation of European Motorcyclists Associations
- Victor Milward (1840–1901), British politician
- William Milward (1702–1742), British actor

== Given name ==
- Milward Adams (1857–1923), American businessman
- Milward Dedman, American politician
- Milward Kennedy (1894–1968), English civil servant, journalist, crime writer and literary critic
- Milward Simpson (1897–1993), American politician

== See also ==
- Millward
