= Caroline C. Fillmore =

Second wife of Millard Fillmore (1813–1881)

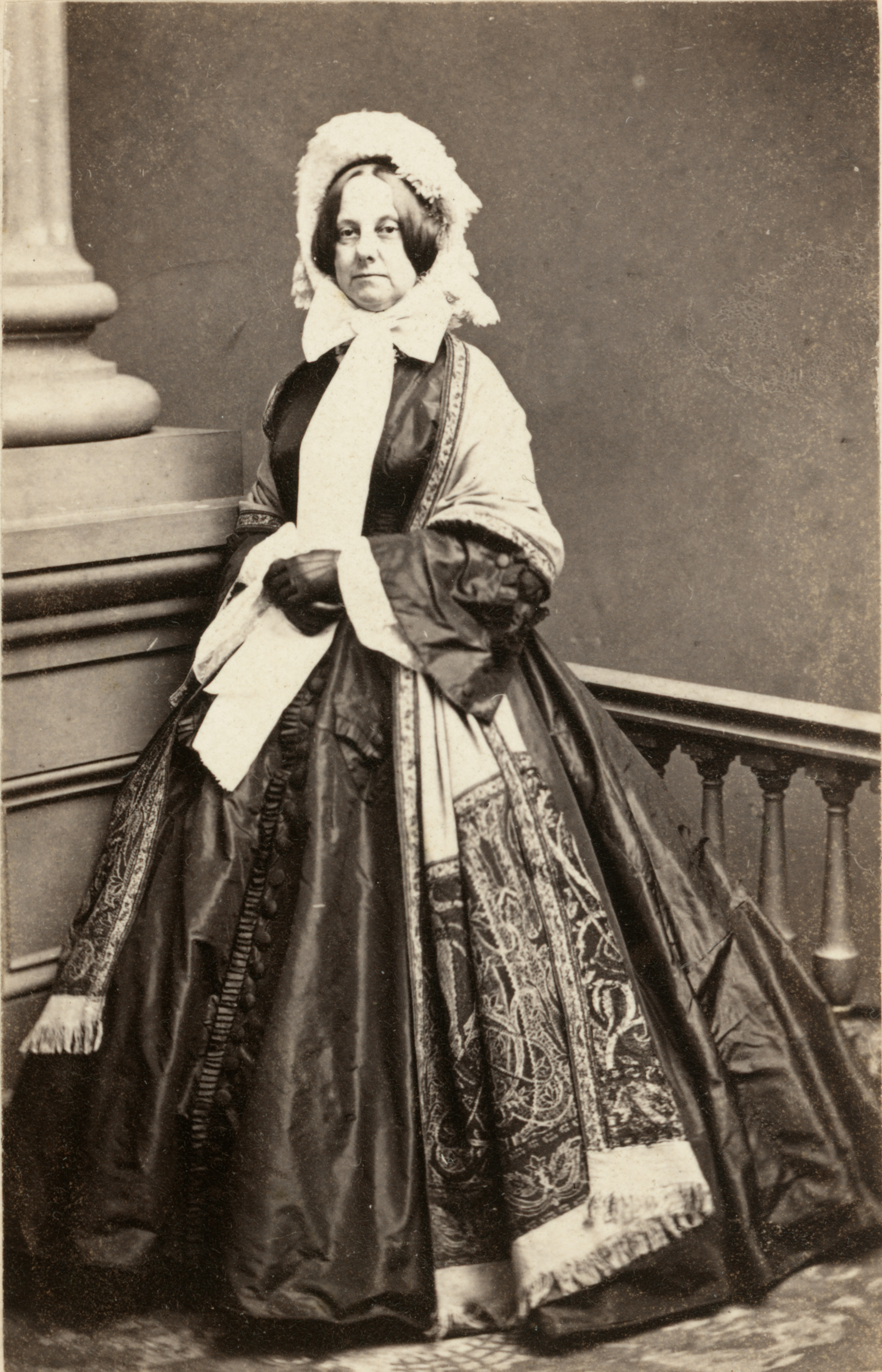
- Photo published by E. & H. T. Anthony & Company, c. 1865
- Born: Caroline Carmichael; October 21, 1813; Morristown, New Jersey, U.S.
- Died: August 11, 1881 (aged 67); Buffalo, New York, U.S.
- Resting place: Forest Lawn Cemetery, Buffalo, New York
- Spouses: Ezekiel C. McIntosh (m. 1832; died 1855) Millard Fillmore (m. 1858; died 1874)

Caroline Fillmore (née Carmichael, formerly McIntosh; October 21, 1813 – August 11, 1881) was the second wife of Millard Fillmore, the 13th president of the United States. They were married in 1858, five years after he left office.

== Life ==
Caroline Carmichael was born October 21, 1813, in Morristown, New Jersey, the daughter of Charles Carmichael and Temperance (Blachley) Carmichael. She married her first husband, widower Ezekiel C. McIntosh (1806–1855), a prosperous Troy, New York, merchant and president of the Schenectady and Troy Railroad, in November 1832. They had no children, and McIntosh's death at age 49 left her very wealthy.

She married Millard Fillmore on February 10, 1858, in Albany, New York. He was 58; she was 44. At the time of their marriage, Caroline required Fillmore to sign a prenuptial agreement. The couple purchased a mansion on Niagara Square in Buffalo, where they settled. They are believed to have had a happy marriage, and Caroline greatly enjoyed her newfound status as the wife of a former president, though her mental and physical health began to decline in the 1860s. Her husband's sudden death in 1874 (he had enjoyed relatively good health — especially when compared to hers — until just shortly before his fatal stroke) only succeeded in making her more infirm, eccentric, and temperamental.

In her final years she frequently changed her will, and upon her death on August 11, 1881, aged 67, suits were initiated by various members of the Fillmore family contesting her directives.

== Resting place ==
She is buried in the Fillmore family plot at Forest Lawn Cemetery in Buffalo.
