= Cambridge Historic District =

Cambridge Historic District may refer to:

in the United States (by state then alphabetically):

- Cambridge Historic District, Wards I and III, Cambridge, Maryland, listed on the National Register of Historic Places (NRHP) in Maryland
- East Cambridge Historic District, Cambridge, Massachusetts, listed on the NRHP in Massachusetts
- Old Cambridge Historic District, Cambridge, Massachusetts, listed on the NRHP in Massachusetts
- Cambridge Historic District (Cambridge, New York), listed on the NRHP in New York
