= Cambridge (village), New York =

Cambridge
- Village
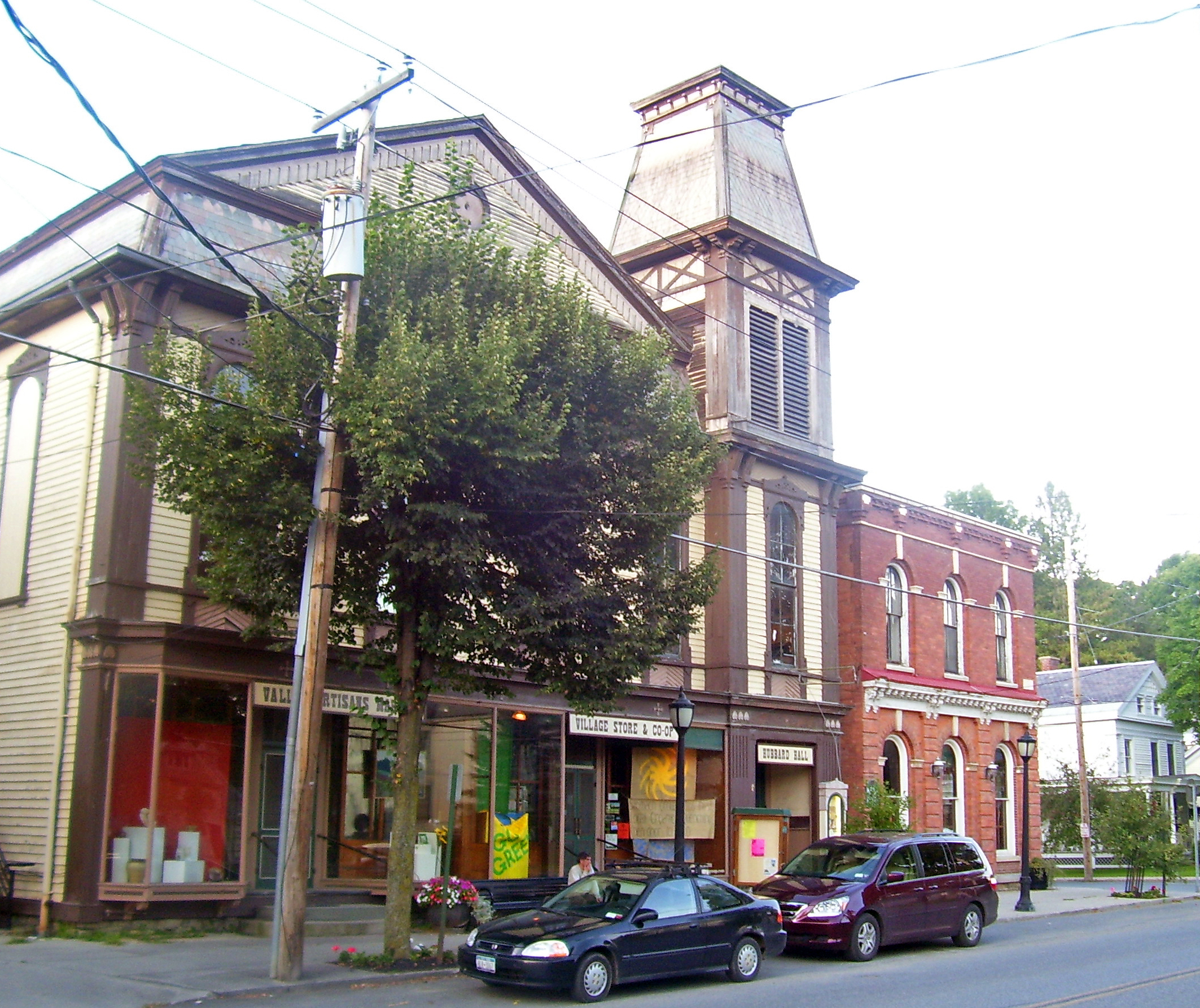
- Hubbard Hall
- Etymology: From Cambridge, England
- Location in Washington County and the state of New York.

- Location of New York in the United States
- Coordinates: 43°1′42″N 73°22′54″W
- Country: United States
- State: New York
- County: Washington
- Founded: 1866

Government
  - Type: Village Hall
  - Mayor: James W. Sweeney

Area
  - Total: 1.73 sq mi (4.47 km^{2})
  - Land: 1.73 sq mi (4.47 km^{2})
  - Water: 0 sq mi (0.00 km^{2})
- Elevation: 496 ft (151 m)
- Highest elevation (Unnamed hill in W corner of village): 760 ft (230 m)
- Lowest elevation (Owl Kill at S boundary): 460 ft (140 m)

Population (2020)
  - Total: 1,788
  - Density: 1,036.1/sq mi (400.05/km^{2})
- Time zone: UTC-5 (Eastern (EST))
  - Summer (DST): UTC-4 (EDT)
- ZIP Code: 12816
- Area code: 518
- FIPS code: 36-11825
- GNIS feature ID: 0945510
- Website: www.cambridgeny.gov

Cambridge is a village in Washington County, New York, United States. The population was 1,870 at the 2010 census. The village of Cambridge is partly in the town of Cambridge and partly in the town of White Creek. It is part of the Glens Falls Metropolitan Statistical Area.

== History ==
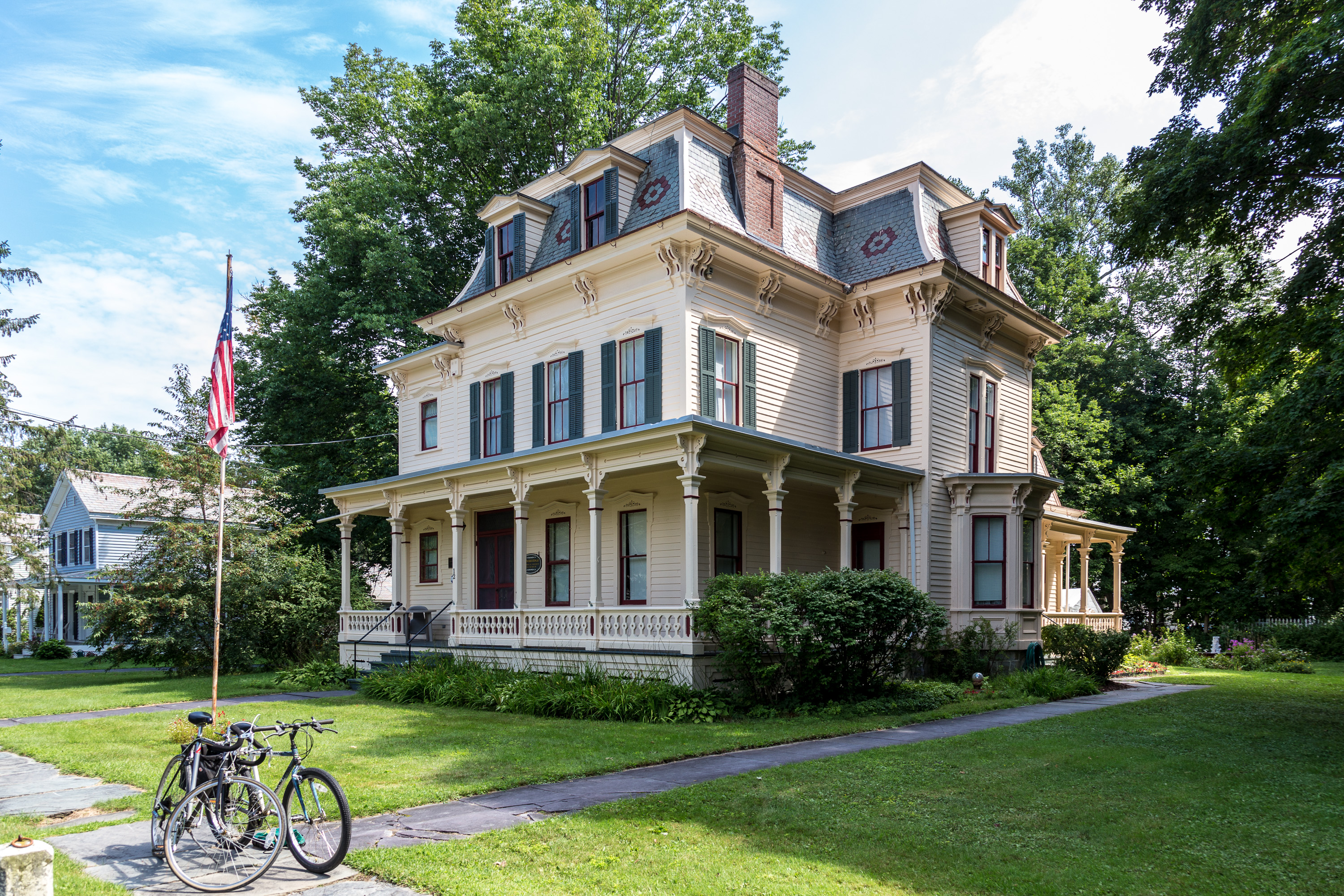
Cambridge Historical Society at 12 Broad Street

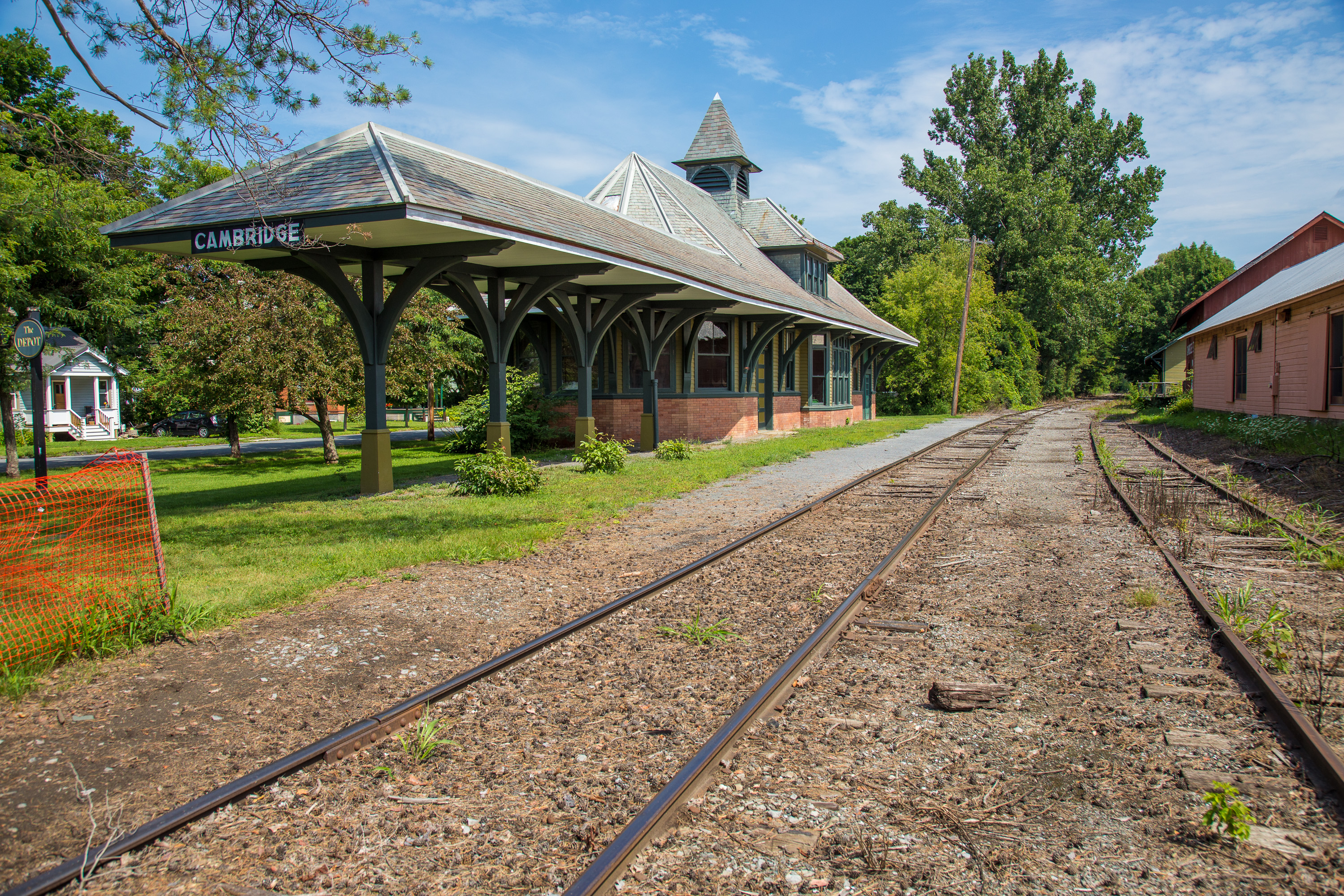
Cambridge Train Depot

The settlement is named after Cambridge in England.

The town and village named Cambridge were once in Albany County, but were transferred to Washington County in 1791.

Hubbard Hall in Cambridge is an 1878 Victorian Opera House, a contributing property to the Cambridge Historic District located on East Main street. It fell into disuse in the 1920s, but was purchased in 1977 by a group of people including Benjie White, who restored it and operated it as a concert venue and, with an expansion in 2000, as a community arts center with theatre, music, dance and visual arts classes and performances. After 37 years, White stepped down as director in the summer of 2014, and was succeeded by David Snider, who left a position as director of artistic programming at the Arena Stage in Washington, D.C.

== Geography ==
According to the United States Census Bureau, the village has a total area of 1.7 square miles (4.4 km^{2}), all land.

Besides being in two towns (Cambridge and White Creek), the village is at the border of the Town of Jackson.

The village is at the junction of NY 22 (North & South Park Street), NY 313 (Maple Avenue/Gilbert Street), and NY 372 (Main Street). County Route 67 and 59 enter the village.

== Demographics ==
Historical population
Census	Pop.	Note	%±
1840	700		—
1860	500		—
1870	1,530		206.0%
1880	1,482		−3.1%
1890	1,598		7.8%
1900	1,578		−1.3%
1910	1,528		−3.2%
1920	1,559		2.0%
1930	1,762		13.0%
1940	1,572		−10.8%
1950	1,692		7.6%
1960	1,748		3.3%
1970	1,769		1.2%
1980	1,820		2.9%
1990	1,906		4.7%
2000	1,925		1.0%
2010	1,870		−2.9%
2020	1,788		−4.4%
U.S. Decennial Census

As of the census of 2000, there were 1,925 people, 755 households, and 477 families residing in the village. The population density was 1,151.1 people per square mile (444.4 people/km^{2}). There were 840 housing units at an average density of 502.3 per square mile (193.9/km^{2}). The racial makeup of the village was 98.13% White, 0.52% Black or African American, 0.10% Native American, 0.31% Asian, 0.26% from other races, and 0.68% from two or more races. Hispanic or Latino of any race were 1.45% of the population.

There were 755 households, out of which 32.3% had children under the age of 18 living with them, 47.8% were married couples living together, 11.5% had a female householder with no husband present, and 36.8% were non-families. 32.8% of all households were made up of individuals, and 17.0% had someone living alone who was 65 years of age or older. The average household size was 2.36 and the average family size was 2.97.

In the village, the population was spread out, with 25.7% under the age of 18, 7.1% from 18 to 24, 24.5% from 25 to 44, 23.0% from 45 to 64, and 19.8% who were 65 years of age or older. The median age was 40 years. For every 100 females, there were 81.9 males. For every 100 females age 18 and over, there were 77.0 males.

The median income for a household in the village was $31,164, and the median income for a family was $41,012. Males had a median income of $31,935 versus $24,453 for females. The per capita income for the village was $15,919. About 9.4% of families and 12.5% of the population were below the poverty line, including 15.1% of those under age 18 and 8.0% of those age 65 or over.

== Education ==
Cambridge Central School, rebuilt in 1950 after a devastating fire, was the site of the Norman Rockwell painting “Triumph in Defeat,” which appeared on the cover of the Saturday Evening Post on May 23, 1953.

Cambridge Central School District has a long tradition of academic excellence, usually ranking in the top 15 in the Capital Area Albany business review. In 2014, Cambridge's AP students’ performance also earned the district's placement on the College Board's Advanced Placement Honor Roll.

In the 2016–17 school year, every fall and winter sports team was a Scholar Athlete Team.

== Notable people ==
- Thomas C. Love, former US Congressman
- Jon Katz, American journalist, author, and photographer
- John James Anderson, American actor and producer
- Laura James, American fashion model
