= List of New York State Historic Markers in Washington County, New York =

This is an incomplete list of New York State Historic Markers in Washington County, New York.

== Listings county-wide ==
	Marker name	Image	Date designated	Location	City or Town	Coords	Marker text
1	FIRST CHURCH			On Nys 40 About 1/2 Mile South Of Argyle	Argyle		And Manse Of Argyle United Presbyterian Congregation Built In 1792 Near Group Of Trees A Short Distance East Of This Spot.
2	KILMER MILL			On Nys 197 At Argyle	Argyle		Built Short Distance West Of Here Before Revolution. First Settlement In Argyle Village And First Grist Mill Within Forty Miles.
3	SITE OF			On Co. Rd. About 1½ Miles East Of South Argyle	Argyle		Allen House Where Nine People Were Killed By Le Loup's Indians July 1777
4	THE STREET			On Nys 40 About 1/2 Mile South Of Argyle	Argyle		Road Laid Out In 1764 By Grantees Of Argyle Patent. Extended East Seven Miles From Hudson River Bordered By Town Lots Of Settlers
5	CONTINENTAL ROAD			On So. Union St., Cambridge	Cambridge		(Di-on-on-da-wa-ha Trail) Col. Baum's Route From Ft. Miller To Bennington August 14, 1777
6	GREAT NORTHERN			At Intersection Of Nys 22 & Nys 313 At Cambridge	Cambridge		War Trail 1628–1764 Over Which Indians Led New England Captives To Canada During Indian Wars
7	SITE OF			On Town Rd. At South End Of Village Of Cambridge	Cambridge		First Church In Cambridge Patent Building Started 1775 Interrupted By Revolution Completed 1783
8	Buskirk Bridge		2004	Southwest corner of Buskirk Road (Washington County Route 59) and Buskirk-West Hoosick Road	Cambridge	42°57′30.6″N 73°26′0.4″W	Buskirk's Red Covered Bridge; Rehabilitated in 2004. Built circa 1850 to replace a previous bridge built in 1804. This crossing served the great Northern Turnpike in 1799.
9	SITE OF			On Town Rd. About 2 Miles East Of Center Cambridge	Cambridge		King's M.e. Church Erected 1823, Named For Fenner King, Leader And Promoter. Destroyed 1897.
10	SITE OF			On Academy St. In Cambridge	Cambridge		Cambridge Washington Academy Incorporated By Regents, 1815 Merged In Union School, 1873
11	FRIEND'S LOG MEETING HOUSE			On Town Rd. About 3/4 Mile East Of Easton	Easton		Surrounded By Burgoyne's Indian Alliews In 1777 But Finding Friends Unarmed Stacked Arms And Attended Meeting Peaceably.
12	BLOCK HOUSE			On Island At Kanes Falls	Fort Ann		Built During Revolutionary War Probably To Protect Sawmill And Water Pipes To Fort Ann
13	BLOCK HOUSE			On Co. Rd. At Kanes Falls	Fort Ann		On Island
14	DEWEY PLACE			On Tn. Rd. At Dewey Bridge	Fort Ann		Built In 1788 By Thaddeus Dewey, Owned By Dewey, White, Collins And Parrish Families. Once An Old Tavern.
15	FORT ANN			On Us 4 At Fort Ann	Fort Ann		"Gateway To North" Here Stood Five Forts 1690–1777 On Route Between Lake Champlain & Hudson River
16	HALF-WAY CREEK			On Us 4 At Fort Ann	Fort Ann		Used In French And Indian & Revolutionary Wars For Transport Of Supplies
17	HOME OF COL. GEORGE WRAY			On Tn. Rd. 2 Mi. West Of Ft. Ann	Fort Ann		Original Manor House Built 1778, Contains Slave Pens. Grave Of Col. Wray In The Orchard.
18	HOME OF COL. GEORGE WRAY			On Us 4 At Fort Ann	Fort Ann		Two Miles West, Built About 1778, Contains Slave Pens.
19	OLD POWDER HOUSE			On Co. Rd. To W. Fort Ann In Fort Ann Village	Fort Ann		Used During French And Indian Wars And Revolutionary War
20	OLD WELL			On Charles St. At Fort Ann	Fort Ann		Used In Fort Site. Built Before Revolutionary War By Queen Anne Of England
21	OLDEST HOUSE			On Us 4 At Fort Ann	Fort Ann		Built Before 1800, Owned Successively By Moore Pike And Shipman Families
22	"THE ISLAND"			On Old Fort St. In Ft. Edward	Fort Edward		Barracks Hospital, Brick-kiln 1755
23	1/4 MILE			On Us 4 At Fort Miller	Fort Edward		Duer House British Headquarters Aug. 14–Sept. 10, 1777
24	BAGLEY'S BRIDGE			On Us 4 About 1 Mile South Of Fort Edward	Fort Edward		(Pontoon Type) Blockhouses Guarded Approaches Built During French And Indian War
25	BLOCKHOUSE			On Bridge St., Fort Edward	Fort Edward		An Outpost Of The Fort Built During French And Indian War
26	FORT EDWARD			On Us 4 At S. End Of Ft. Edward	Fort Edward		1755 Great Carrying Place Fort Nicholson 1709 Fort Lydius 1731 Fort Lyman 1755
27	FORT EDWARD			On Us 4 At N. End Of Ft. Edward	Fort Edward		1755 Great Carrying Place Fort Nicholson 1709 Fort Lydius 1731 Fort Lyman 1755
28	GENERAL SCHUYLER'S			On Us 4 About 5 Miles South Of Fort Edward	Fort Edward		Entrenchments Headquarters Of American Army After The Evacuation Of Fort Edward July 1777
29	JANE MC CREA			On B'way In Ft. Edward	Fort Edward		House 1777
30	NEAR HERE STOOD			On Bank Of Old Canal Off B'way Between State & Argyle Sts., Ft. Edwd.	Fort Edward		The Red House, Mentioned In Madame Riedesel's Memoirs Built About 1765
31	NEAR HERE WAS			At Intersection Of B'way & Moon Sts., Ft. Edward	Fort Edward		Northeast Bastion, Part Of Outworks Fort Edward 1755
32	OLD MILITARY ROAD			At Intersection Of Case St. & Burgoyne Ave., Ft. Edward	Fort Edward		Followed The General Direction Of Burgoyne Avenue To Moss Street In Kingsbury
33	ON THE OPPOSITE SIDE			On Us 4 At Fort Miller	Fort Edward		Of The River Fort Miller Built During French And Indian War
34	ON THE WEST BANK			On Us 4 About 5 Miles South Of Fort Edward	Fort Edward		Was The Home Of Colonel John Mc Crea Patriot Brother Of Jane Mc Crea
35	ORIGINAL BURIAL PLACE OF			On Us 4 About 2½ Miles South Of Fort Edward	Fort Edward		Jane Mc Crea July 28, 1777
36	REMAINS OF			On Old Fort St. Ft. Edward	Fort Edward		Old Moat Hospital, Part Of Outworks Fort Edward 1755
37	REVOLUTIONARY			On Case St., Ft. Edward	Fort Edward		Blockhouse Attacked July 27, 1777
38	SITE OF HOME			On Town Rd. About 3/4 Mile East Of Fort Miller	Fort Edward		Judge William Duer Statesman And Patriot
39	STATE ST. BURYING GROUND			At Intersection Of State & Notre Dame Sts., Ft. Edward	Fort Edward		Original Burial Place Of Duncan Campbell Second Burial Place Of Jane Mc Crea
40	THE GRAVE OF			On Us 4 Between Fort Edward & Hudson Falls	Fort Edward		Duncan Campbell & Jane Mc Crea Are Just Within And To The Left Of This Gateway
41	TO THE SITE OF			At Intersection Of Old Fort & Montgomery Sts., Ft. Edward	Fort Edward		Old Ft. Edward Built 1755
42	TO THE SOUTH			On Notre Dame St. In Ft. Edward	Fort Edward		Putnam's Rangers And Provincial Troops Defeated French And Indians After They Had Killed Twelve Men July 23, 1757
43	ERECTED 1784			On Old Rte. Nys 22 In Truthville	Granville		The First Baptist Church In The Town Of Granville
44	ERECTED 1789			On Nys 149 At S. Granville	Granville		The First Congregational Church In The Town Of Granville
45	FIRST CHURCH			On Nys 22 In Middle Granville	Granville		In The Town Of Granville Erected In 1782 By The Union Religious Society
46	FRIENDS			At Intersection Of State & Notre Dame Sts., Ft. Edward	Granville		Meeting House Erected 1806 Beside Church Site Of Log School House Of Friends Later A District School
47	FROM THIS PLACE			On Co. Rd. At Clarks Mills	Greenwich		Burgoyne's German Troops Marched To The Battle Of Bennington
48	MC NEAL'S FERRY			On Us 4 At Bridge Over Hudson R. At Thomson	Greenwich		Operated During Revolutionary Days
49	POSITION OF			On Tn. Rd. Leading To Abandoned Bridge Over Hudson R., Clarks Mills	Greenwich		Burgoyne's Bridge Of Boats On Which He Crossed The Hudson
50	POSITION OF			On Co. Rd. Between Clarks Mills & Thomson	Greenwich		General Stark Before Crossing The River
51	SITE OF			On Tn. Rd. Leading To Abandoned Bridge Over Hudson R., Clarks Mills	Greenwich		The British Camp Before Crossing Hudson Later Occupied By General Fellows' Continentals
52	SITE OF			On Co. Rd. At Clarks Mills	Greenwich		Captain Furnival's Battery Commanding Marshall House And River Crossing
53	BROWN'S TAVERN			On Nys 40 At S. Hartford	Hartford		Erected 1802 By Caleb Brown
54	CLINTON GIFT			On Co.rd. At Hartford	Hartford		Gov. Clinton Gave This Land To Baptist Society, 1798, Log Meeting House, 1788 Stood 50 Feet To The South, Church Erected Here, 1805
55	HAWK'S CORNERS			On Nys 149 About 4 Miles West Of Hartford	Hartford		Saville's Tavern Built 1800 M. Bull's Blacksmith Shop 1794, A Town Pound 1794 Higley's Shoe Shop, 1850
56	MILL CREEK			On Nys 40 At S. Hartford	Hartford		Covell's Mills East 1810, Hatch Tannery 100 Ft. South 1800, Scott's Clothing Works And Other Mills Below. Woolen Mill, 1 Mile West, 1836
57	SITE OF			On Nys 149 At Hartford	Hartford		Old Mills I. Norton Built Dam 1814 Down's Clothing Works Woodell Starch Mill 1866 Daicy Cabinet Works 1870 Higby Tannery Below 1818
58	HOME AND LABORATORY			On Rte. 29, 2 Miles S.w. Of Salem	Salem		Dr. Asa Fitch, Jr. 1809–1879 First State Entomologist, 1854-71. Pioneer In Study Of Crop Pests And Their Control
59	A LOG CHURCH			On Co. Rd. About 1½ Miles West Of White Creek	White Creek		Which Stood Here Was Burned By The British Battle Of Walloomsac Aug. 16, 1777
60	GREAT NORTHERN			On West Side Of S. Park St. In Cambridge	White Creek		War Trail C. 1650–1700 Over Which Indians Led New England Captives To Canada During Indian Wars
61	SITE OF			On Nys 22 About 4 Miles South Of C	White Creek		Skirmish Between Hessian Troops & Cambridge Settlers Several Patriots Taken Prisoners, Aug. 15, 1777.
62	SITE OF			On Us 22 About 4 Miles South Of Cambridge	White Creek		British Encampment August 13, 1777 Col. Baum's Forces Camped Here
63	SITE OF			On Co. Rd. At White Creek	White Creek		Union Academy Established In 1810
64	SITE OF			On Tn. Rd. At White Creek	White Creek		"John Allen's Hat Shop" Born 1775 - Died 1855
65	SITE OF			On Tn. Rd. At White Creek	White Creek		Friends Meeting House Erected By Society Of Friends Of White Creek. Preparative Meeting In 1783. Finished In 1785. Larger One Built 1804.
66	SITE OF			On Tn. Rd. At Ash Grove	White Creek		Ash Grove Cemetery And 2D M.e. Church In U.s. Organized 1770 By Irish Methodists Under Thomas Ashton And Philip Embury
67	SITE OF HOME			On Co. Rd. About 1 Mile West Of White Creek	White Creek		John Wood Field Officers Were Voted For Here, May 11, 1776. Also Birthplace John Wood's Son, Jethro Wood, Inventor First Iron Mould Plow (1814)
68	NEAR THIS SPOT			On Us 4 At Whitehall	Whitehall		March 21, 1780, 3 Tories And Many Indians Murdered A Settler And His Wife And Captured Lemma Bartholomew. After His Return He Served As Ensign In Revolution

== See also ==
- List of New York State Historic Markers
- National Register of Historic Places listings in New York
- List of National Historic Landmarks in New York
