= George Forss =

American photographer (1941–2021)

- Born: May 4, 1941; South Bronx, New York City
- Died: July 17, 2021 (aged 80); Cambridge, New York
- Occupation: Photographer
- Partner: Donna Wynbrandt

George Forss (May 4, 1941 – July 17, 2021) was an American photographer.

== Early life ==
Forss was born in South Bronx on May 4, 1941. His father, Hank, was deported from the United States to Finland after Forss' birth; his mother, Norma, practised vernacular photography. He suffered from polio as a child. He was removed from his mother's custody and consequently spent five years in an orphanage. After moving out of the orphanage system, Forss went back to his mother – who had osteoporosis and rheumatoid arthritis – and became her caregiver. They grew close over their shared interest in photography. He became a self-taught photographer after being introduced to photography at the 1964 New York World's Fair.

== Career ==
Forss initially took photographs on the streets of New York City and sold $5 prints on the sidewalks outside of the New York Metropolitan Museum of Art from 1973. He was discovered seven years later by Life magazine photographer David Duncan close to Grand Central Terminal. Forss photographed city-scapes and more intimate street scenes using rudimentary equipment. His work received acclaim from Ansel Adams and Henri Cartier-Bresson, with the former noting how he had "seen no photographs of recent years as strong and as perceptive". Towards the end of the 1980s, he relocated from Brooklyn and acquired a studio in Cambridge, New York, using the small inheritance left by an uncle.

=== Publication and exhibition ===
Forss' work (compiled by Duncan) was published in 1984 in New York New York: Masterworks of a Street Peddler. Forss was also the subject of a BBC documentary in 1982 titled A Fairytale of New York: The George Forss Story, which chronicled his rise from obscurity to international fame. He increased the price for his photographs to $20 and eventually stopped peddling on the streets altogether.

Life magazine featured Forss' work as an example of New York photography before the September 11 attacks. This was due primarily to his photography of the World Trade Center buildings and the financial district. This has since been recognized as his most celebrated photograph. His work was exhibited at the Brooklyn Museum, and some of his photographs were obtained by the International Center of Photography.

== Personal life ==
Forss was in a domestic partnership with Donna Wynbrandt until his death. They did not have children.

Forss died at the age of 80 on July 17, 2021, at his home in Cambridge, New York. The cause of death was heart failure.
