= New York State Route 372 =

State highway in Washington County, New York, US

New York State Route 372
- Map of Washington County in eastern New York with NY 372 highlighted in red

Route information
- Maintained by NYSDOT
- Length: 8.93 mi (14.37 km)
- Existed: 1930–present

Major junctions
- West end: NY 29 in Greenwich
- East end: NY 22 in Cambridge

Location
- Country: United States
- State: New York
- Counties: Washington

Highway system
- New York Highways; Interstate; US; State; Reference; Parkways
← NY 371	→ NY 373

New York State Route 372 (NY 372) is an east–west state highway in southern Washington County, New York, in the United States. It extends for just under 9 miles (14 km) from an intersection with NY 22 in the village of Cambridge to a junction with NY 29 in the village of Greenwich. The route is known as Main Street inside of both villages, the most populated and developed locations on the route. Outside of the two communities, NY 372 is a rural connector traversing mostly undeveloped areas. The road was taken over by the state of New York in stages during the 1910s and 1920s and designated as NY 372 as part of the 1930 renumbering of state highways in New York.

== Route description ==
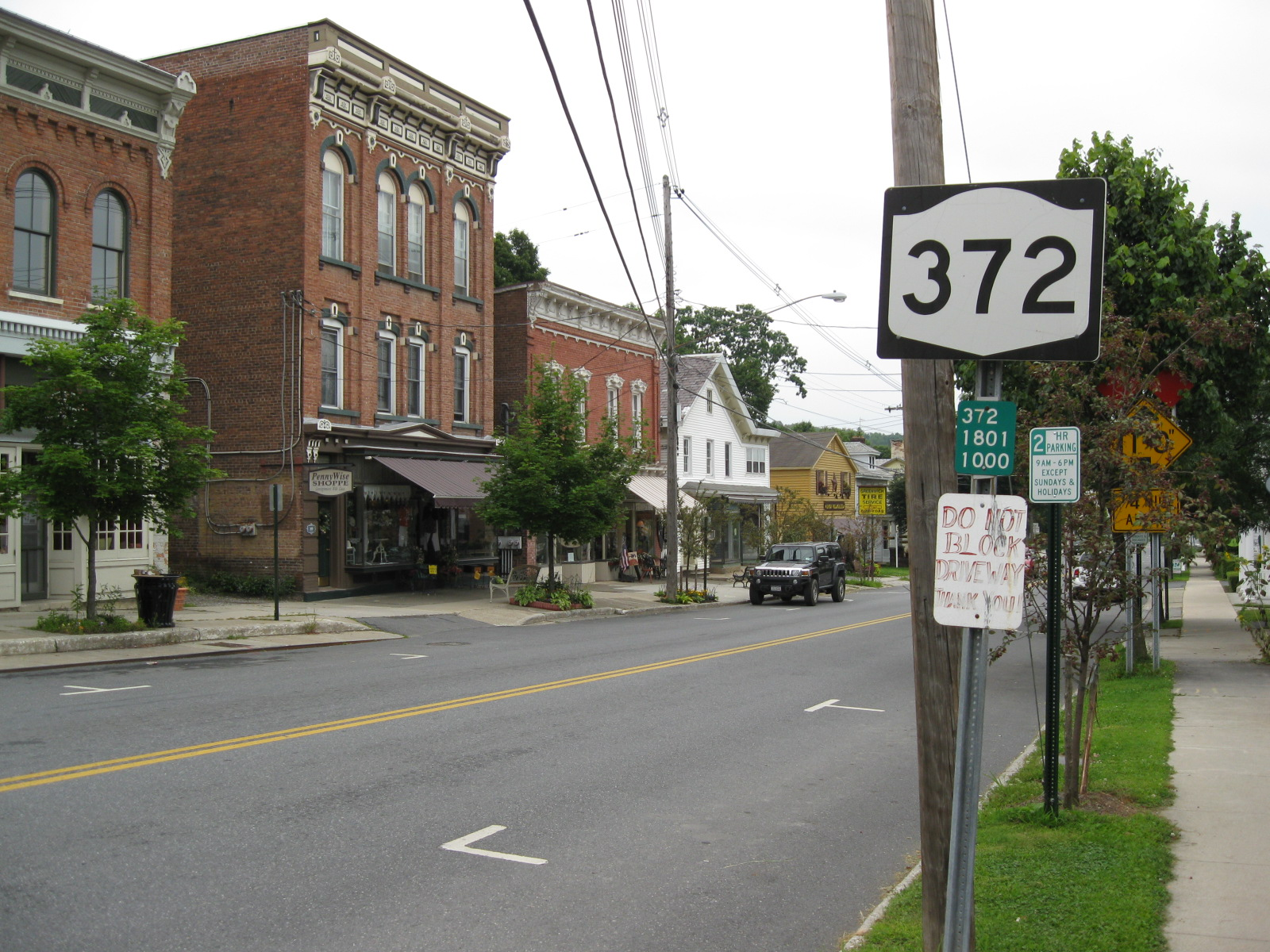
NY 372 heading eastbound along the village of Greewnich

NY 372 begins at an intersection with NY 29 (Main Street) in the village of Greenwich. The route progresses to the southeast, following Main Street through the southern, lesser developed parts of the village before leaving the community after crossing over the Batten Kill. Across the river, the road's surroundings become less developed as it winds its way through the rural parts of eastern Washington County. NY 372 turns to the south at an intersection with Old Cambridge Road, which parallels the highway for a short distance.

After this bend to the south, the highway traverses undeveloped areas until it reaches an intersection with County Route 74A (CR 74A). Development along the route increases slightly at the junction, where the route makes a curve to the east. It crosses from the town of Greenwich to the town of Cambridge shortly afterward. Just east of the town line, NY 372 meets CR 60 prior to resuming a southeastern progression toward the village of Cambridge. Past the turn, the homes give way to a short stretch of dense woodlands, which in turn are replaced with open fields not long afterward. The highway continues to wind its way southeastward across the fields, soon intersecting CR 62.

The route eventually reaches the hamlet of Coila, where its surroundings become developed once again. Not far to the south is the village of Cambridge, where the road becomes Main Street for the second time. Just inside the village limits, NY 372 connects to CR 59 before turning to the east and entering the heart of the village. Here, the highway passes by several densely populated blocks containing rows of homes and many historic buildings. The route continues for several blocks to Park Street, where it terminates at an intersection with NY 22. CR 67 continues east from the junction, following NY 372's right-of-way out of Cambridge.

== History ==
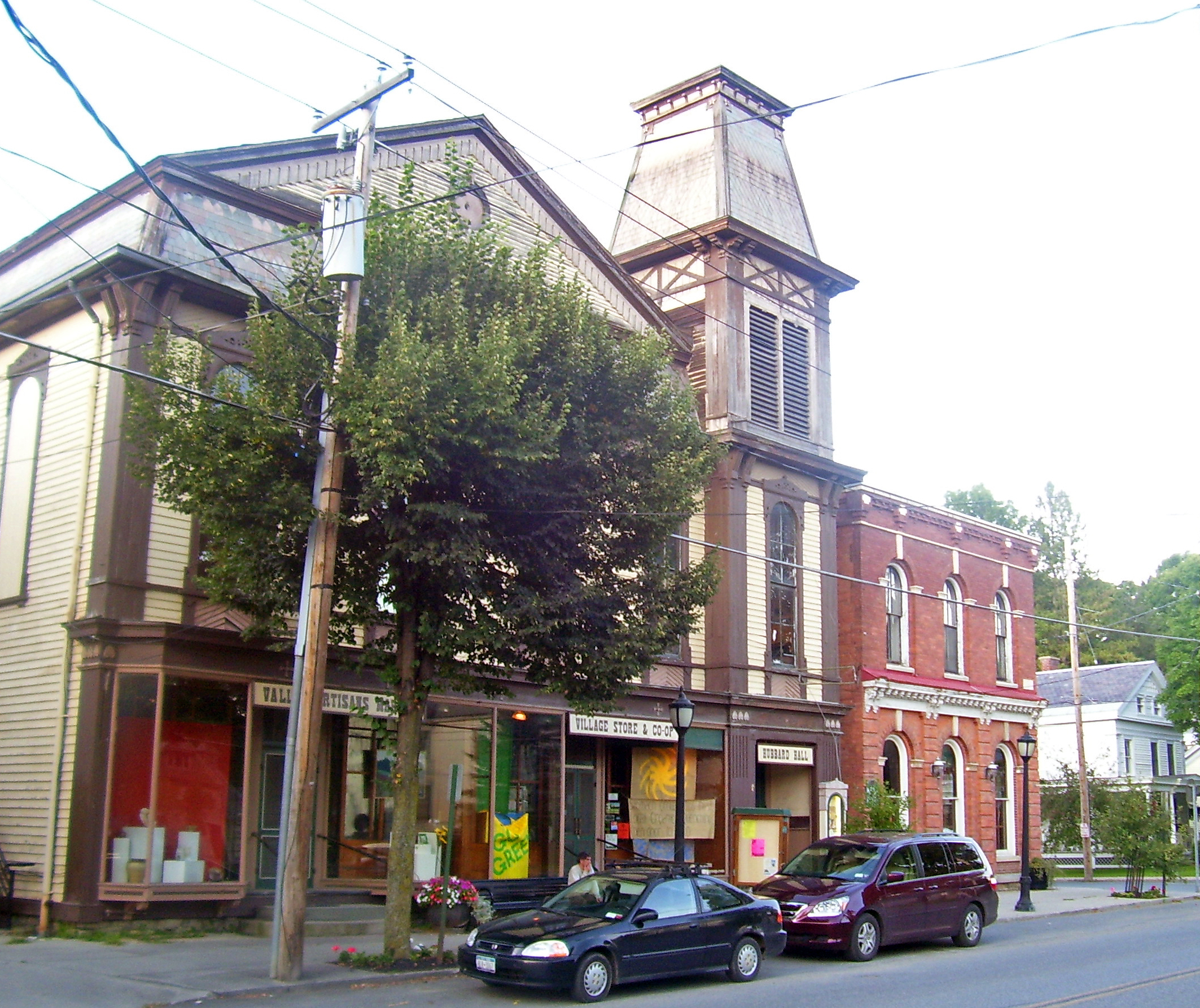
Hubbard Hall in downtown Cambridge

Modern NY 372 was improved to state highway standards in three parts, separated by the two village lines that the highway crosses. The first section to be brought up to standards was the piece within the village of Cambridge, which was added to the state highway system on February 23, 1914, and inventoried as State Highway 1082 (SH 1082). The next segment to be upgraded and included in the system, the portion inside of the village of Greenwich, was added on September 14, 1918, as SH 1436. By 1920, the section connecting the two—designated as SH 1438—was only 4 percent reconstructed, even though the contract for improving the road was let just four days after the contract for SH 1436 was awarded. It was fully completed by 1926. In the 1930 renumbering of state highways in New York, the three unsigned state highways were designated as NY 372. The route has not been altered since that time.

== Major intersections ==
The entire route is in Washington County.

Location	mi	km	Destinations	Notes
Village of Greenwich	0.00	0.00	NY 29	Western terminus
Village of Cambridge	8.93	14.37	NY 22 – Granville, Eagle Bridge	Eastern terminus
1.000 mi = 1.609 km; 1.000 km = 0.621 mi
