= Hubbard Hall (Cambridge, New York) =

Theater and cultural center in Cambridge, New York, United States

Coordinates: 43°1′41.394″N 73°22′47.64″W

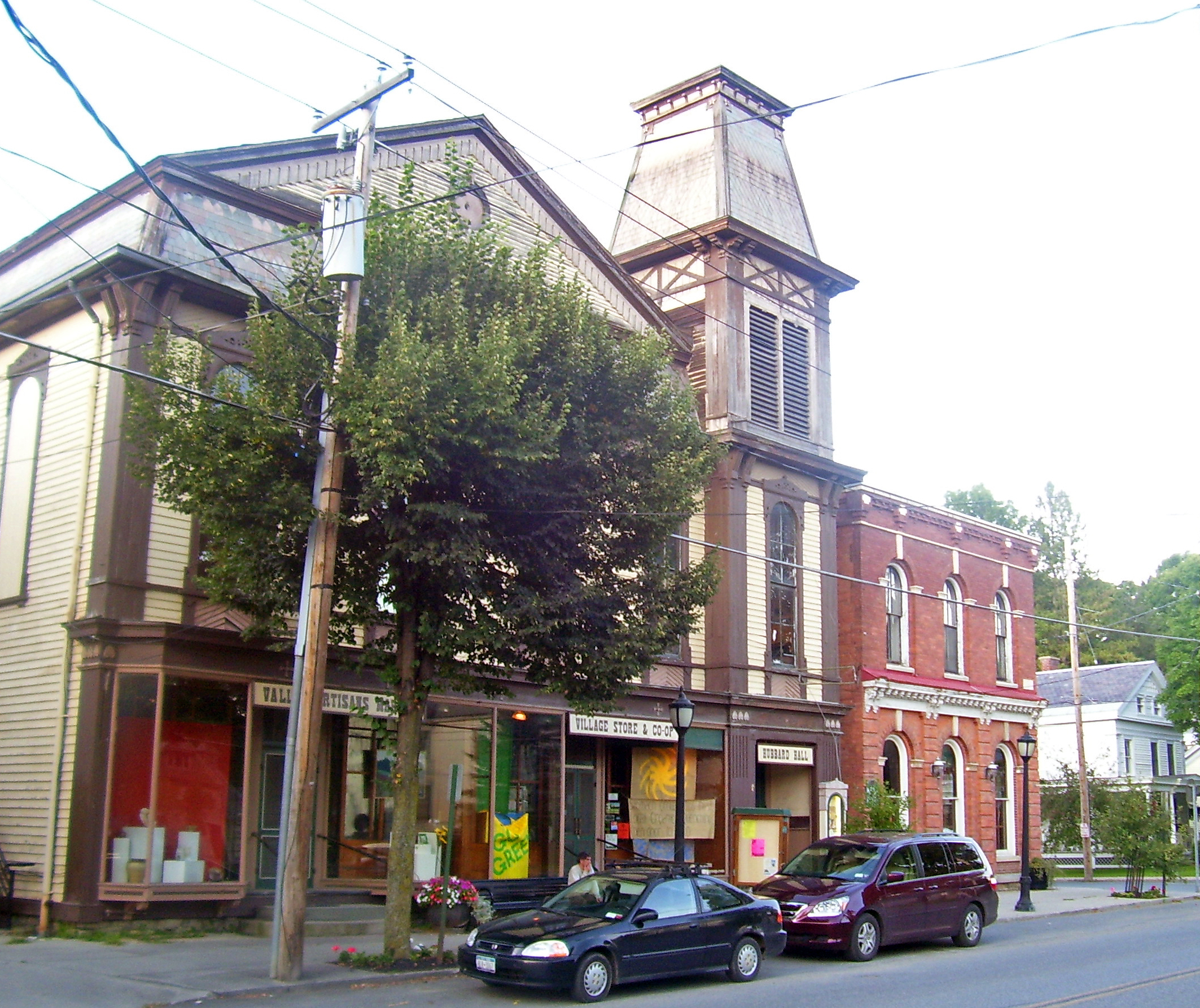
Hubbard Hall, Cambridge New York

Hubbard Hall is a Victorian opera house and cultural center in Cambridge, NY, United States. It is operated by the non-profit organization, Hubbard Hall Projects.

== History of the hall ==
Hubbard Hall was built in 1878, as a Victorian opera house in what is now the Cambridge Historic District. In the 1920s it became disused, until 1977 when a group of local individuals purchased it and restored it as a concert hall. By 2000, it was functioning as a community arts center, hosting a variety of dance, theater and visual arts activities. In 2014, the Hubbard Hall Center for the Arts received a Culture & Heritage Project Grant from the New York State Council on the Arts.

== Hubbard Hall Opera Theater ==
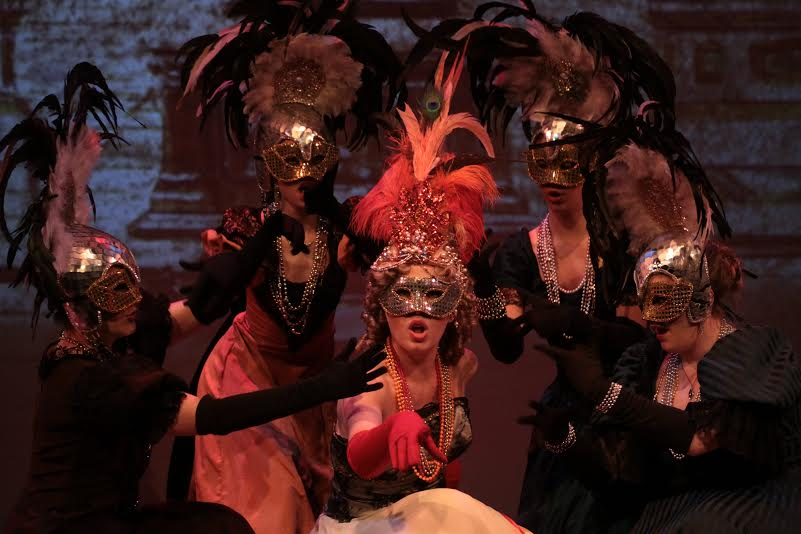
Photo by Cliff Oliver

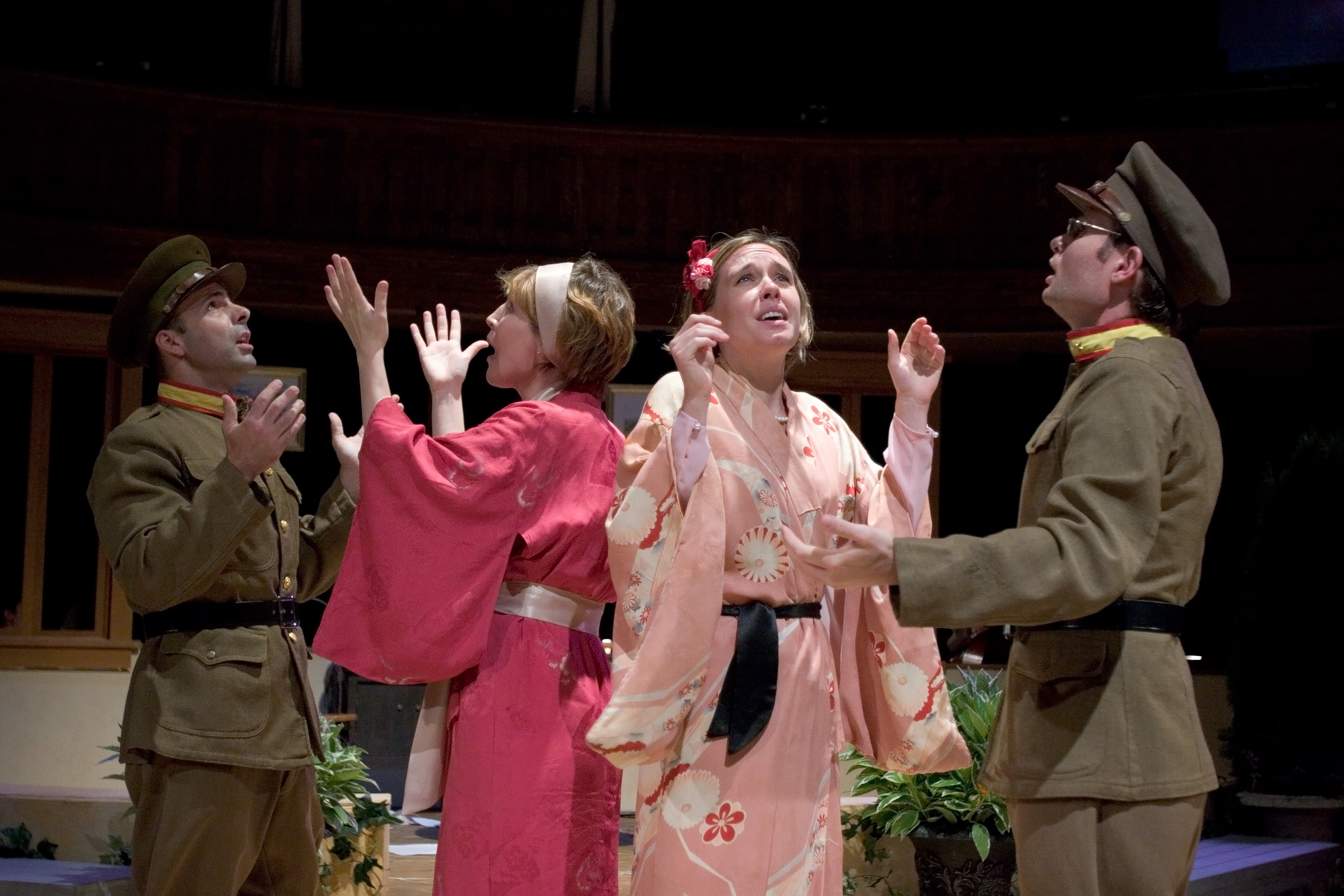
Photo by Jon Barber

The Hubbard Hall Opera Theater is an opera company founded by its artistic director Alexina Jones in 2008.

HHOT presents operatic performances of classically trained singers and instrumentalists in New England and upstate New York, and provides affordable cultural entertainment for rural audiences. HHOT casts young professional artists in key roles, as well as experienced professionals who are hired as mentoring artists. The company also operates a conservatory program during the summer in which college and graduate level students perform cover or comprimario roles.

HHOT primarily operates in the summer, mounting two productions in August and organizing several smaller touring concerts throughout the rest of the year. Typically the August productions feature one full length performance with reduced orchestra and a shorter lesser known second-stage performance that varies in structure from year to year. Hubbard Hall Projects presents "pay what you will" events which apply to the final dress rehearsals and occasionally the second-stage productions.

== Theatre Company at Hubbard Hall ==
The Theatre Company at Hubbard Hall, founded in 1999 by Kevin McGuire, mounts productions of Shakespearian and other dramatic plays.

== The Battenkill Chorale ==
The Battenkill Chorale is a 100 person choral group which is based at Hubbard Hall.
