= Thomas C. Love =

American politician (1789–1853)

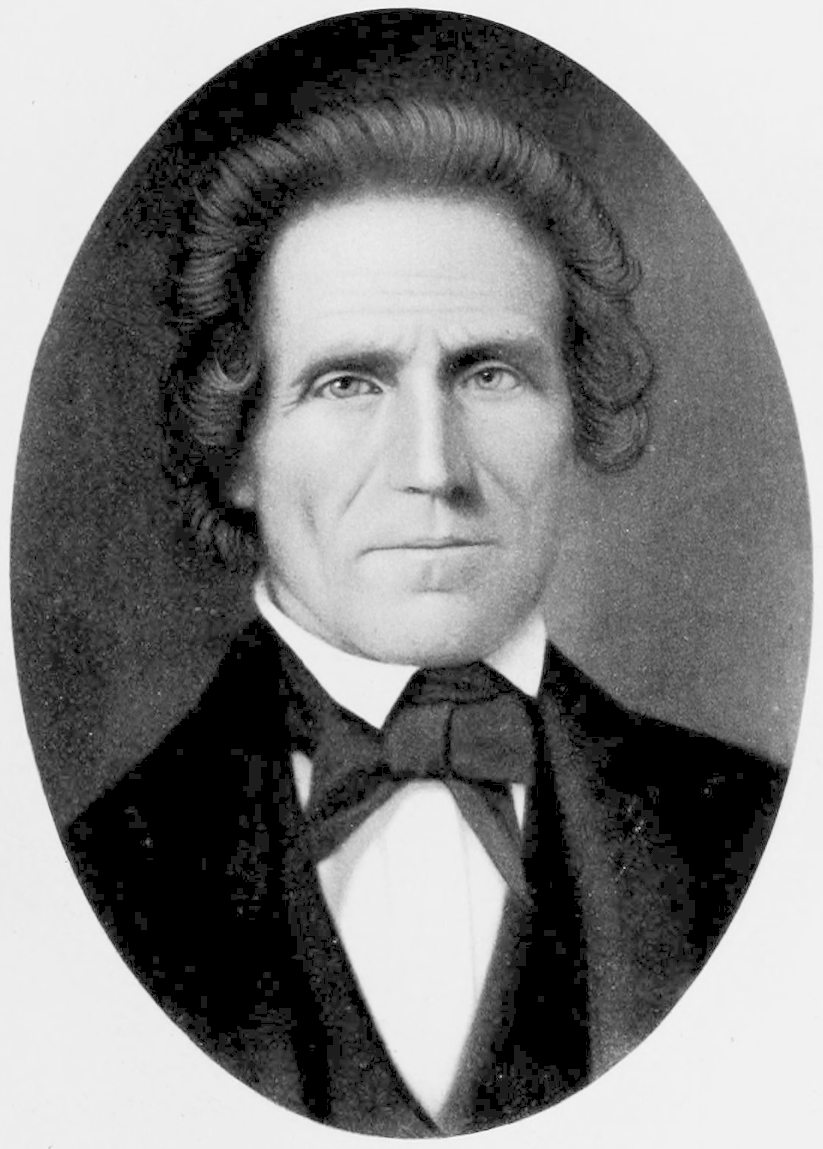

Member of the United States House of Representatives from 32nd district
- In office March 4, 1835 – March 3, 1837
- Preceded by: Millard Fillmore
- Succeeded by: Millard Fillmore

Personal details
- Born: Thomas Cutting Love; November 30, 1789 Cambridge, New York
- Died: September 17, 1853 (aged 63) Buffalo, New York
- Resting place: Forest Lawn Cemetery
- Party: Anti-Jacksonian
- Spouse: Maria Malbty
- Children: 4
- Occupation: Lawyer, politician

Thomas Cutting Love (November 30, 1789 – September 17, 1853) was a U.S. representative from New York.

== Biography ==
Born in Cambridge, New York, Love attended the common schools. He served as a Volunteer in the War of 1812 and was wounded and taken prisoner at the Battle of Fort Erie on September 17, 1814. He was taken to Quebec and kept imprisoned until the close of the war.

When peace came, Love began to study law, and was admitted to the bar and set up a practice. He moved to Batavia, New York, and later to Buffalo. He served as judge of Erie County in 1828 and 1829. He served as district attorney 1829-1835 and surrogate 1841-1845.

Love was elected as an Anti-Jacksonian to the Twenty-fourth Congress (March 4, 1835 – March 3, 1837). He declined to be a candidate for renomination in 1836. He resumed the practice of law until 1847 when he retired from active practice.

He married Maria Malbty, and they had four children.

He died in Buffalo on September 17, 1853, and was interred in Forest Lawn Cemetery.

U.S. House of Representatives
Preceded by Millard Fillmore	Member of the U.S. House of Representatives from New York's 32nd congressional district March 4, 1835 – March 3, 1837	Succeeded by Millard Fillmore
