= Cambridge Historic District (Cambridge, New York) =

Historic district in New York, United States

- U.S. National Register of Historic Places
- U.S. Historic district
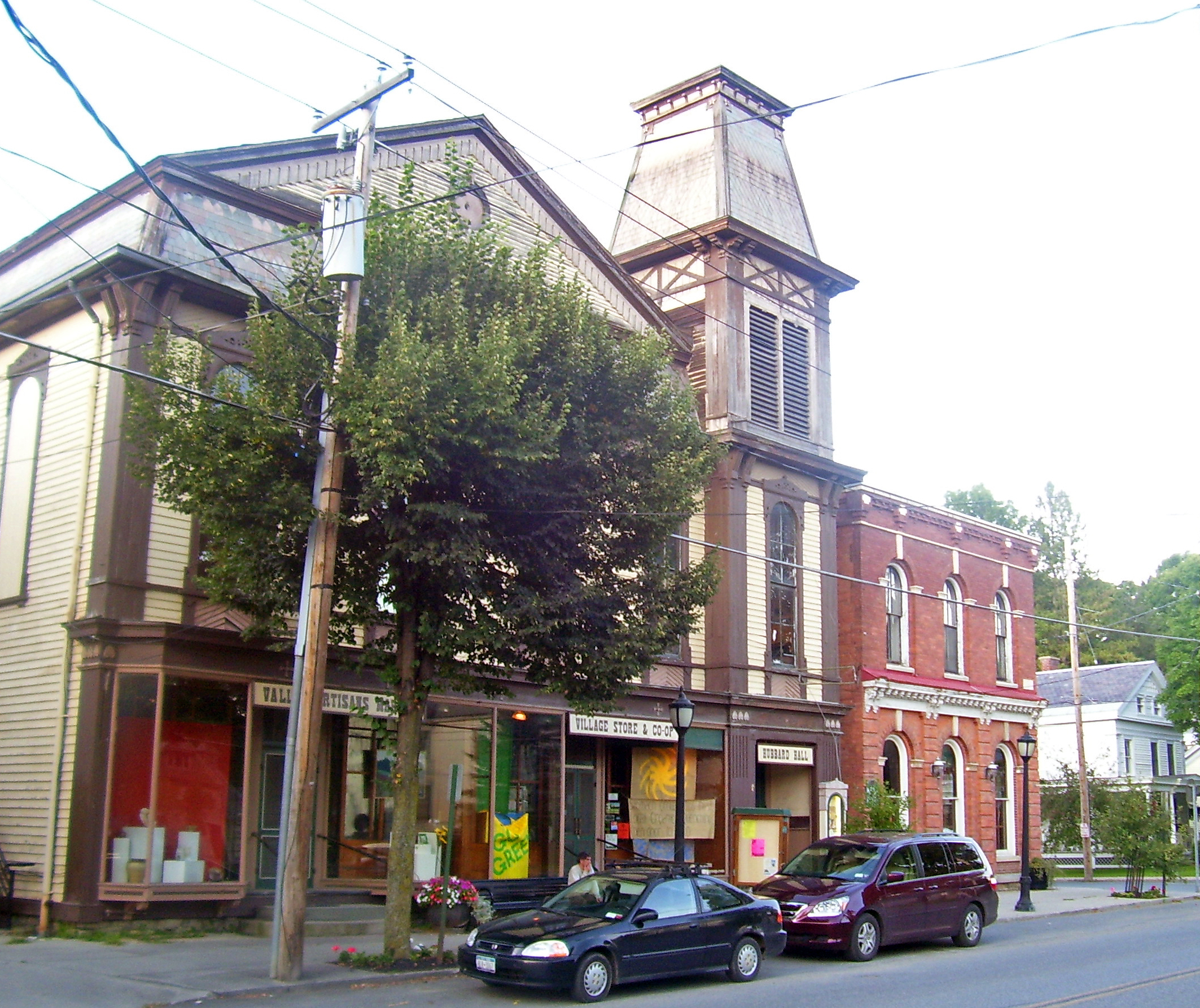
- Hubbard Hall, south elevation, 2008

- Location within New York
- Location: Cambridge, NY
- Nearest city: Bennington, VT
- Coordinates: 43°1′41″N 73°23′10″W
- Area: 105 acres (42 ha)
- Built: 19th century
- Architectural style: Federal, Greek Revival, late Victorian
- NRHP reference No.: 78001922
- Added to NRHP: 1978

The Cambridge Historic District is located in an irregular pattern along streets in the village of Cambridge in Washington County, New York. It is a 105-acre (42 ha) area reflecting the extent of the village when it was first incorporated in the 1860s and its subsequent development in the years the Rice Seed Company, largest in the world at the time, was located here.

Many of the district's 240 buildings date to the 19th century, with a few 18th-century structures and modern intrusions. Among its contributing properties are the Rice Seed Company's headquarters, a late Victorian opera house and a church with Tiffany interiors and stained glass windows. In 1978 it was designated a historic district and listed on the National Register of Historic Places. In 1978, it included 198 contributing buildings and one other contributing site.

== Geography ==
The district is built around the axis of East and West Main Streets (NY 372 west of North and South Park Street (NY 22), and Washington County Route 67 east of it to just beyond Gilbert Street (NY 313)), and North and South Union Streets (also the dividing line between the towns of Cambridge and White Creek). Some adjacent buildings with addresses on cross streets of Main, including North and South Park Street (NY 22), that front on Main, are included.

The area is mostly flat, reflecting the nearby presence of the Owl Kill, a tributary of the Hoosic River which flows through the district in a controlled channel at a small park on the south side of West Main between Pearl Street and Memorial Drive. The tracks of the former Delaware and Hudson Railroad run through the district along Railroad Avenue, dividing Main Street into east and west. The land is densely developed. Most of its buildings are frame houses.

Commercial buildings in the district are concentrated on the blocks of West Main between Pearl and Park, and again at the Union Street intersection. There is plenty of residential infill on Main, and a few churches. The 16 non-contributing modern properties within the district are commercial and governmental properties such as a gas station, supermarket and post office, mostly on Main Street near the two major intersections.

== History ==
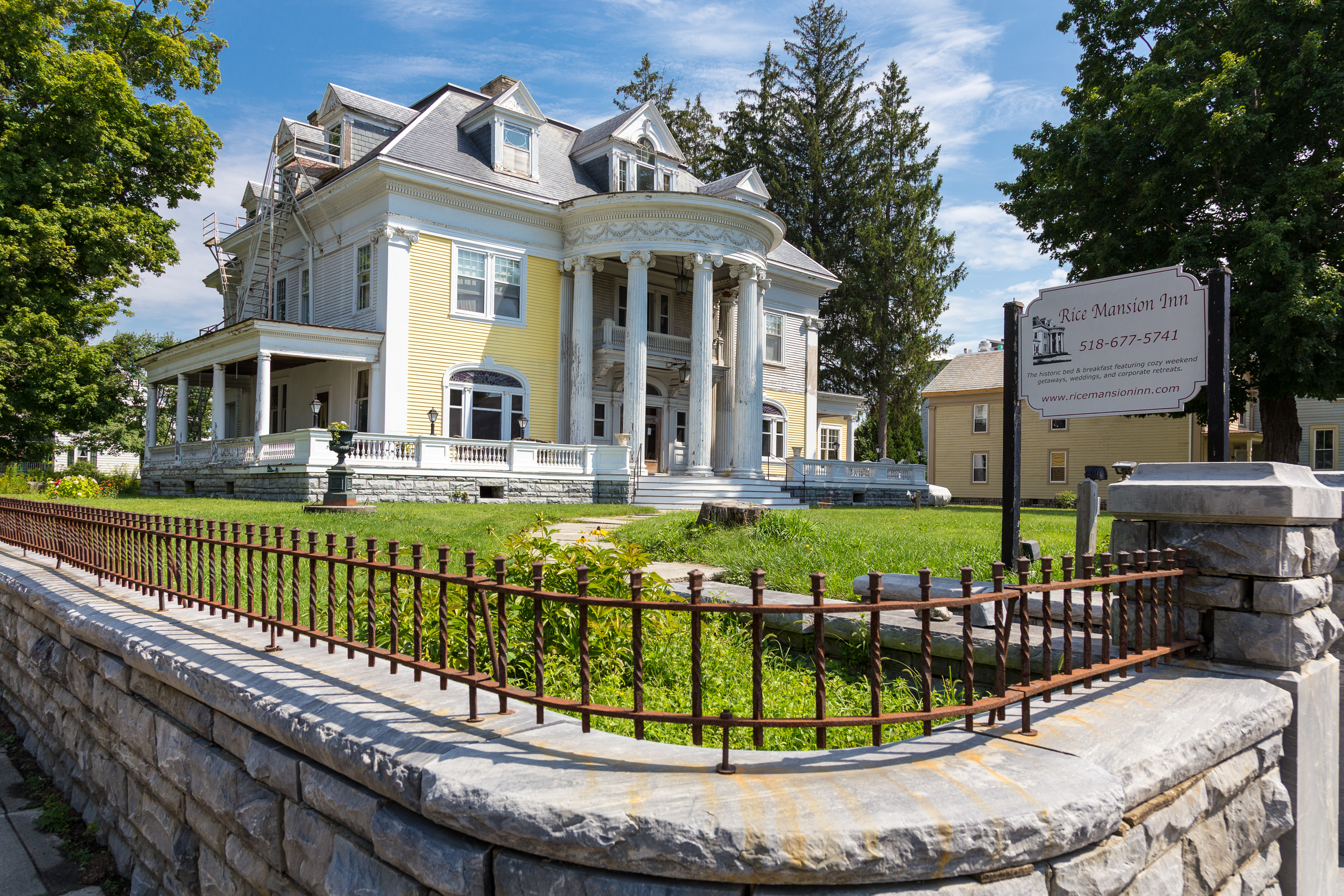
Rice Mansion Inn was built in 1903 for seed tycoon of-the-era, Jerome B. Rice, and his wife Laura.

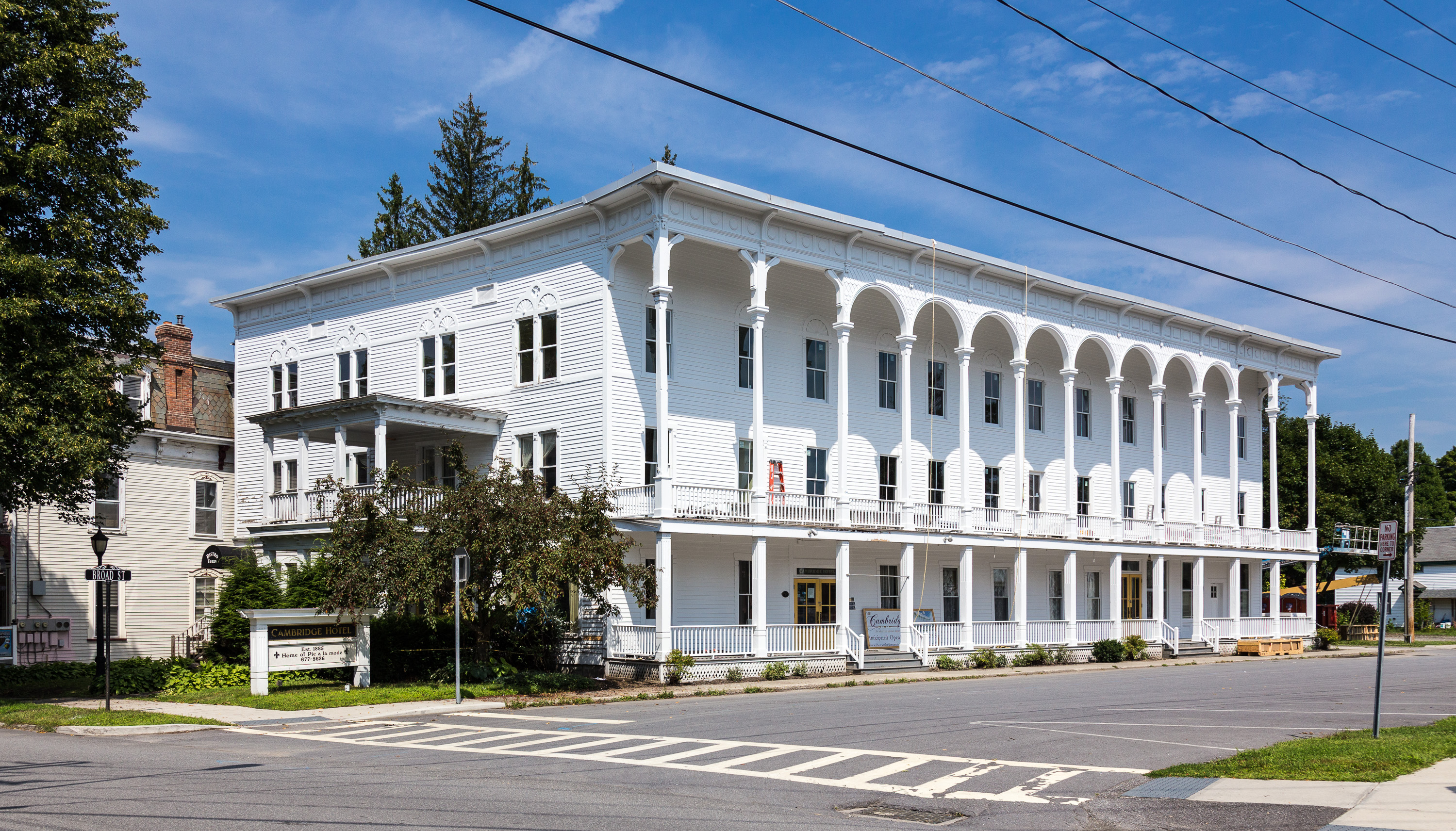
Cambridge Hotel, Main & Broad St, Cambridge, NY.

The settlement of the future village began in the 1760s, after the resolution of the French and Indian War had made it safe to settle in the previously contested frontier area north of Albany. In 1761, Cadwallader Colden, the colony's surveyor general and acting governor, was involved in the purchase of the Cambridge Patent, part of which was soon conveyed to a group of six partners, his son among them. The provisions of the purchase agreement required that governments be elected by the landowners, that one family for each 1,000 acres (400 ha) be settled and own land outright within the patent within three years, and that 200 acres (80 ha) be set aside for a minister and schoolmaster. These conditions made it possible for a democratic society of free landowners to develop on the patent.

The area was especially desirable for settlers because of the great extent of flat and arable terrain around the Owl Kill (although the creek could not be used for mills since it thus generated no power). Few records of the earliest settlement on the land exist because of the long dispute over the land between New York and neighboring Vermont. It is believed that many early settlers came from Scotland and Northern Ireland, because of the early success of the Presbyterian churches in the village.

After the Revolution, settlement increased again. The earliest surviving house in the district, and the village, is the Dorr-Randall House on East Main Street, built in 1779. It is one of several proto-Federal style houses from this postwar period scattered around the district. An academy was organized in 1800. It no longer remains, but its boarding house on West Main has been converted into apartments.

As the 19th century progressed, three distinct settlements emerged within the area: Cambridge, Dorr Corners and North White Creek, all around crossroads. Early turnpikes connected them with markets to the south, near today's Troy, and at Burlington in the north. Flax and sheep farming were introduced, providing raw material for early textile mills in the nearby cities and small towns like Hoosick Falls and Bennington.

The Champlain Canal improved these connections in 1825. It provided enough of an economic stimulus that two new churches could be built: a Methodist church in 1838 (rebuilt in 1861) at 47 East Main, and the village's Baptist church, at 3 West Main, in 1844.

Almost three decades later, in 1852, the Troy and Rutland Railroad was built through the town, and a station established at the center of the then-hamlet of North White Creek. Fourteen years later, the three decided to merge into the village of Cambridge. For this reason many of the village's streets intersect at odd angles, even today.

The years that followed were the village's economic peak, as reflected by the mid-century architecture of most of its houses. Another church, St. Luke's, was built in the year of incorporation, with a Tiffany interior and windows. The railroad led to some industrial development, and the construction of Hubbard Hall at 25 West Main in 1878 reflected Cambridge's new importance. The strongest catalyst for development was the establishment of the Rice Seed Company's headquarters in the village in 1879. Its warehouse and accompanying office building, completed in 1895, are at 15 West Main. Founder Jerome Rice's home is across the street at 16 West Main.

By the turn of the century, Rice was the largest seed company in the world, employing 200 people locally. Over the 20th century, changes in the national and regional economies adversely affected Cambridge. Traffic on the canal slowed down, and in the middle of the century the Adirondack Northway was opened to the west in Saratoga County, displacing the canal as the region's main transportation artery. Rice closed in 1976.

== Significant contributing properties ==
- Dorr-Randall House, 151 East Main Street. Built in 1779 for a prominent local physician, its intricate carved ornamentation indicates an owner of considerable economic means for the time. It is considered one of the finest Federal style buildings in the county.
- Hubbard Hall, also known as the Old Opera House, 25 West Main Street. One of Cambridge's major landmarks, this Second Empire building was constructed for theatrical performances in 1878. Still in use as a cultural center.
- Rice Seed Company Warehouse and Office Building, 15 West Main Street. Cambridge's major employer of the late 19th century built the warehouse in 1879 and the office in 1895.
- St. Luke's Church, 4 St. Luke's Place. This 1866 church features Tiffany interior work and windows.

== Preservation ==
Unlike most other municipalities with historic districts in the state, Cambridge has not done anything specific in its zoning to preserve the district's historic character. There is no separate board or commission charged with the task. In 2009 it adopted a new zoning code which recognizes several different types of residential uses within the village and provides for a future historic overlay district.

== See also ==
- National Register of Historic Places listings in Washington County, New York
