= White Creek Historic District =

Historic district in New York, United States

- U.S. National Register of Historic Places
- U.S. Historic district
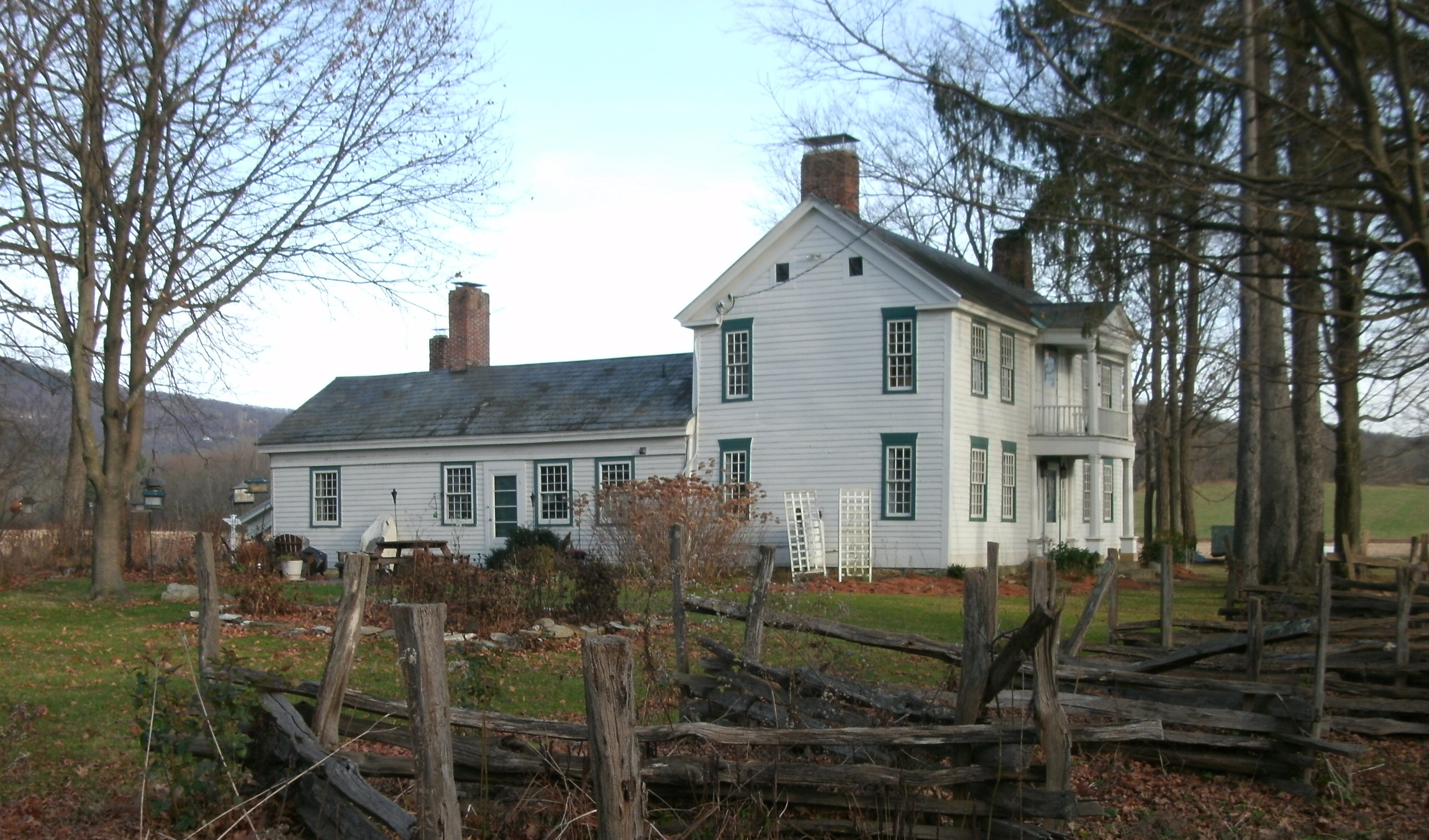
- John Allen House, November 2010

- Location within New York Location within the United States
- Location: CR 68, Byars and Niles Rds., White Creek, New York
- Coordinates: 42°58′18″N 73°17′22″W
- Area: 41 acres (17 ha)
- Architectural style: Greek Revival, Federal
- NRHP reference No.: 79001644
- Added to NRHP: April 26, 1979

White Creek Historic District is a national historic district located at White Creek in Washington County, New York. It includes 20 contributing buildings. The buildings are predominantly residential and were built between 1770 and 1885. The majority are Greek Revival in style, with representatives of the Federal and Queen Anne styles. Greek Revival style commercial structures are also present and include a church, hotel / tavern, general store, and harness shop.

It was listed on the National Register of Historic Places in 1979.

== Gallery ==
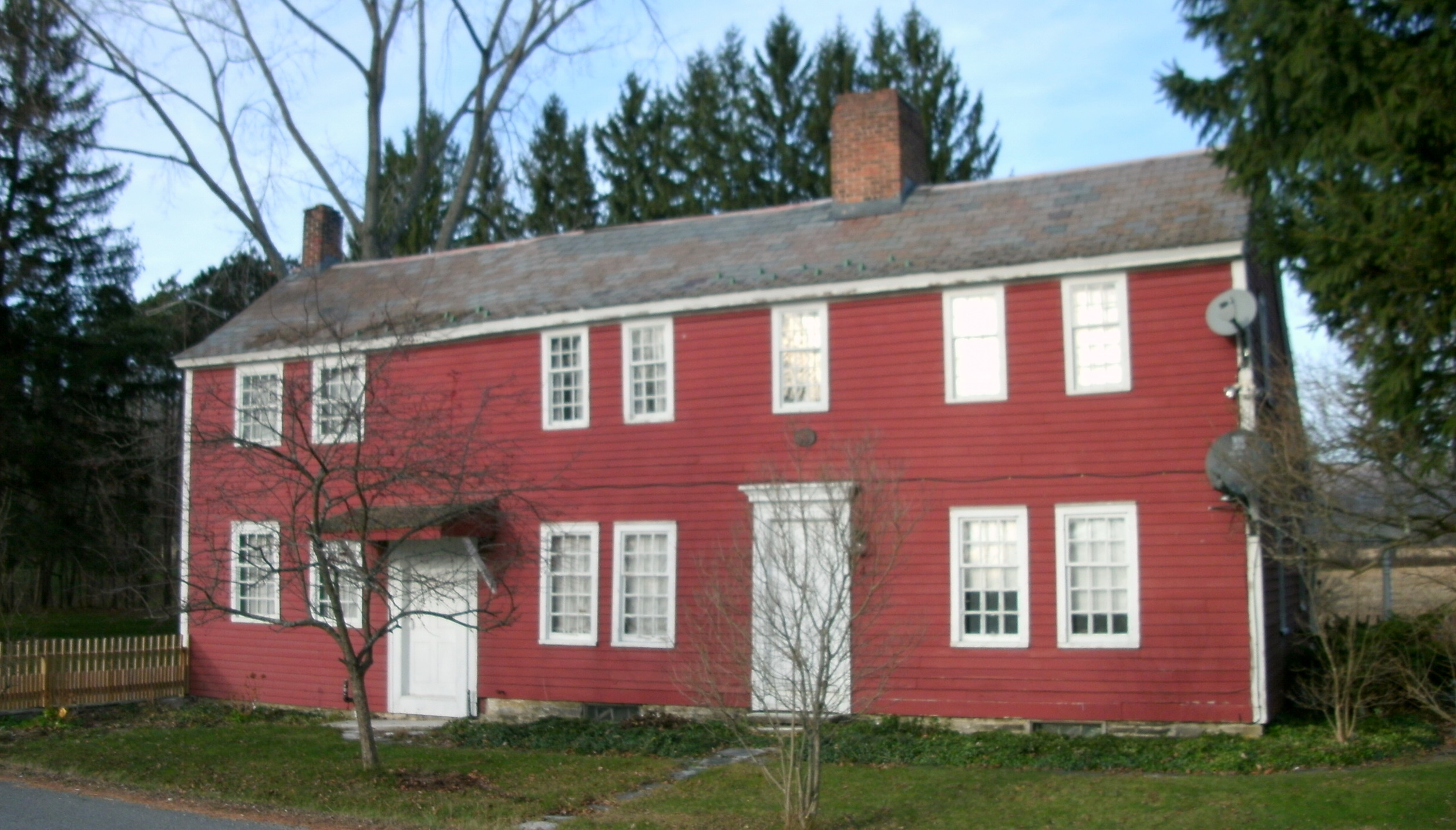
Christopher Allen House, November 2010

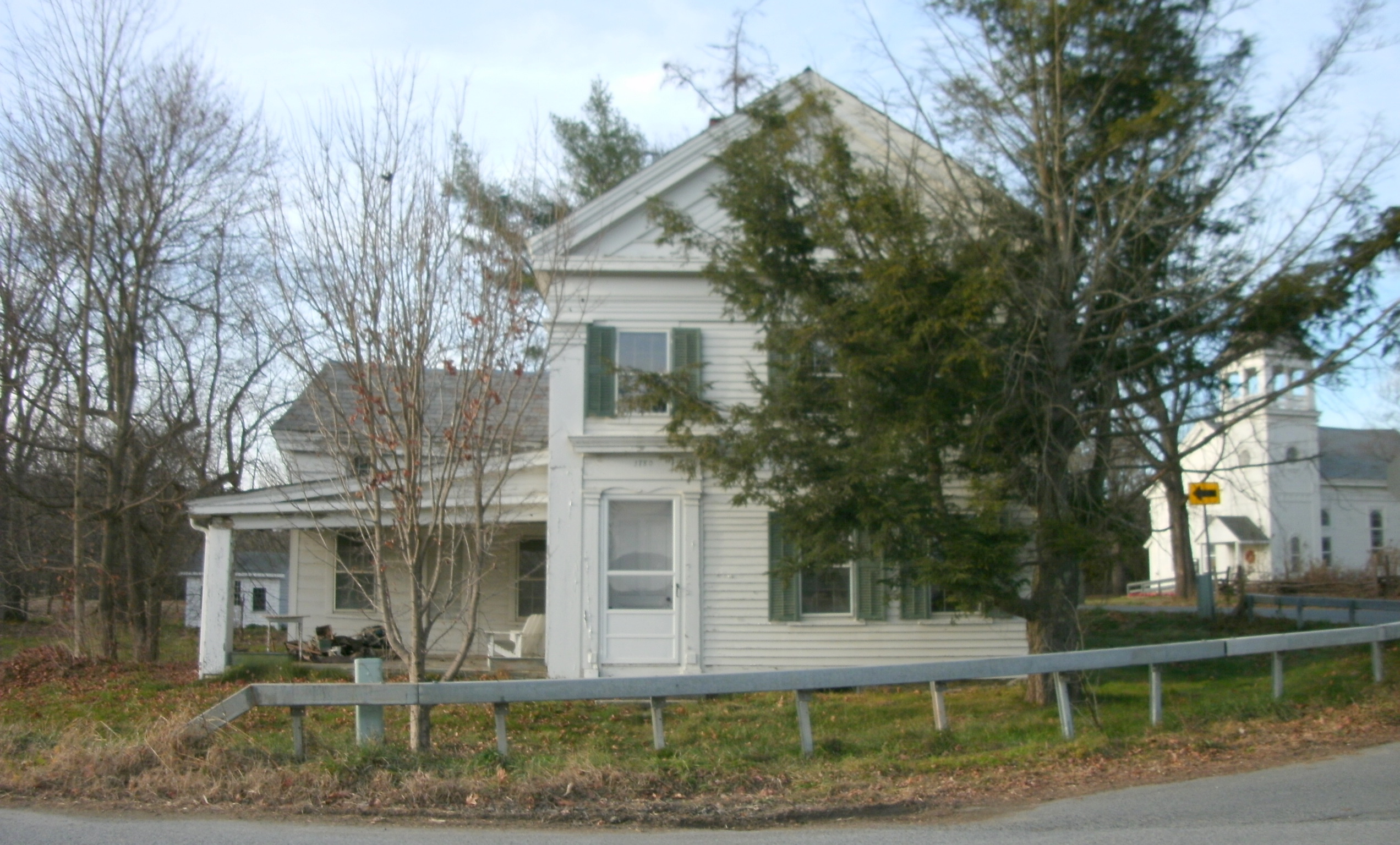
John Allen Jr. House, November 2010

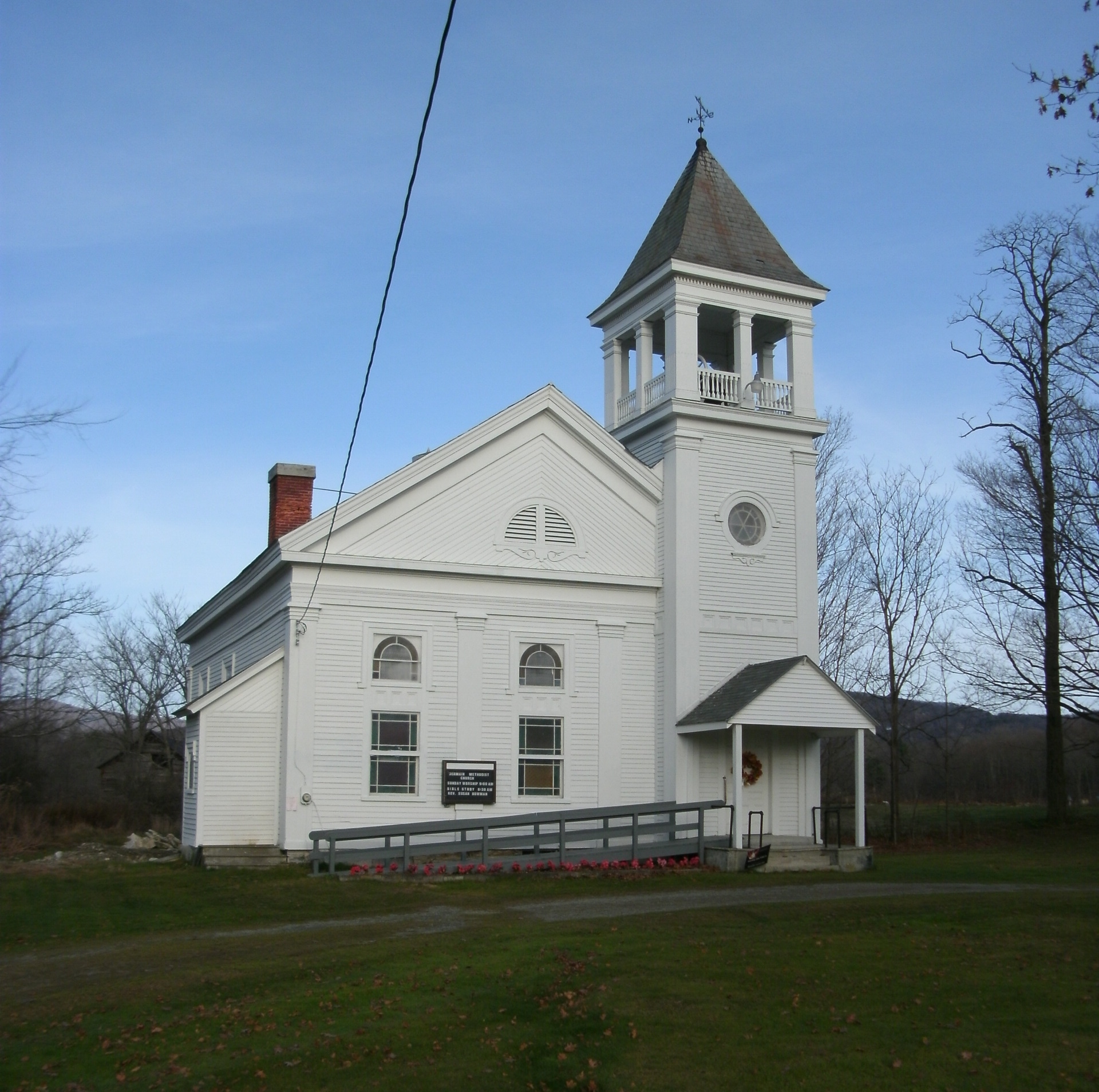
Methodist (Baptist) Church, November 2010

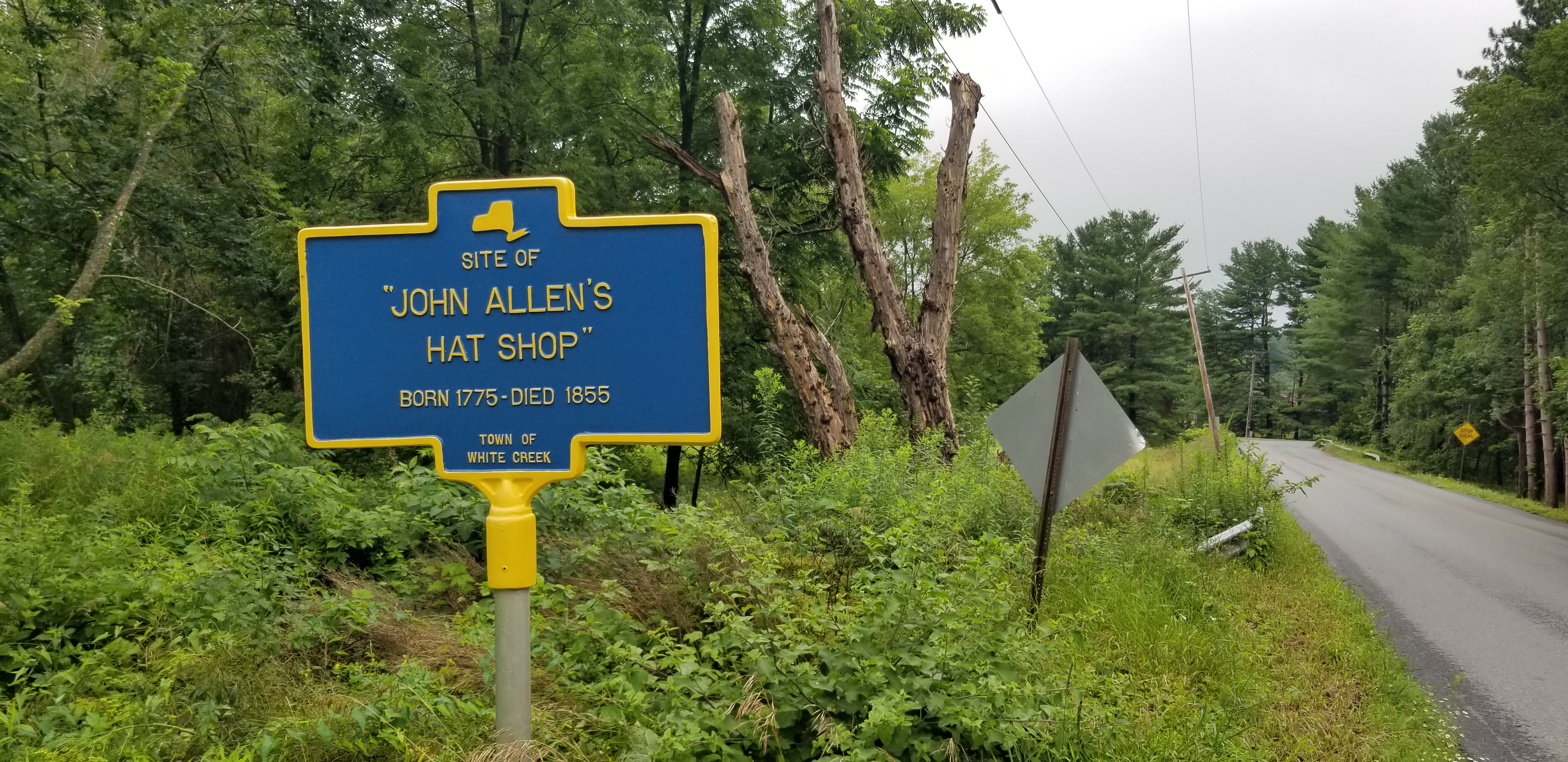
John Allen's Hat Shop historical marker, July 2021
