= East Cambridge Historic District =

Historic district in Massachusetts, United States

- U.S. National Register of Historic Places
- U.S. Historic district
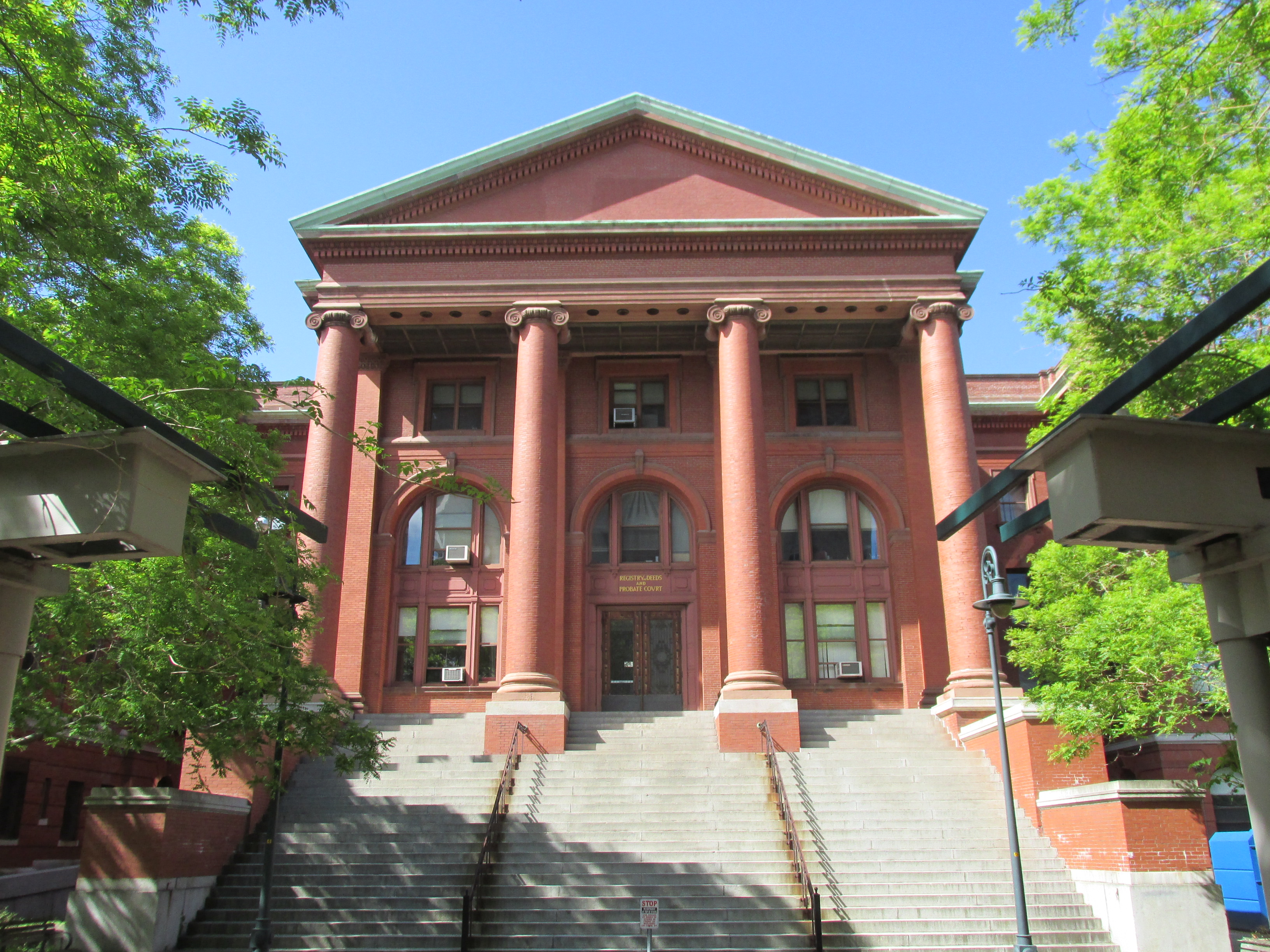
- The Middlesex South Registry of Deeds

- Location within Massachusetts Location within the United States
- Location: Cambridge, Massachusetts
- Coordinates: 42°22′12″N 71°4′51″W
- Area: 16.4 acres (6.6 ha)
- Architectural style: Mid 19th Century Revival, Early Republic
- MPS: Cambridge MRA
- NRHP reference No.: 83000797
- Added to NRHP: June 30, 1983

The East Cambridge Historic District encompasses the historic center of East Cambridge, Massachusetts. It includes the major buildings that were built to house county services for Middlesex County beginning in the 1810s, and a cluster of largely vernacular Greek Revival worker housing located west of the county complex on Otis, Thorndike, Spring, and Sciarappa Streets. The district was listed on the National Register of Historic Places in 1983.

== Description and history ==
Before the turn of the 19th century, the East Cambridge area was historically isolated from the rest of Cambridge by marshy land. The first organized development attempt, made by the Lechmere Point Corporation, began around that time and resulted in the layout of a rectilinear street grid in the area. It was the first planned land use of its type in the Boston area. The area's growth was the result of two key decisions: the first was a grant of land to the county for new facilities; the second was the establishment of the New England Glass Company, which spurred both residential construction and industrial development.

Major landmarks from the early years of East Cambridge's development are an 1827 Federal-style church, built as a Congregational church and based on an Asher Benjamin design, and the Charles Bulfinch-designed county courthouse, which has been surrounded by a complex of sympathetically-designed buildings that include the brick Queen Anne Putnam School. The major surviving industrial facility in the district is the Davenport factory, bounded by Otis, Thorndike, and First Streets, in which a high-profile furniture manufacturer operated into the 20th century.

Vernacular workers' housing in late Federal and Greek Revival styles were built in robust quantity in the area, some examples of which survive on Otis Street. A few Second Empire rowhouses were also built, in a simpler emulation of more sophisticated styles found in Boston. Few houses were built after circa 1890; there are only a few examples of Queen Anne and Colonial Revivals.

== See also ==
- National Register of Historic Places listings in Cambridge, Massachusetts
