= Cambridge, New York =

Cambridge
- Town
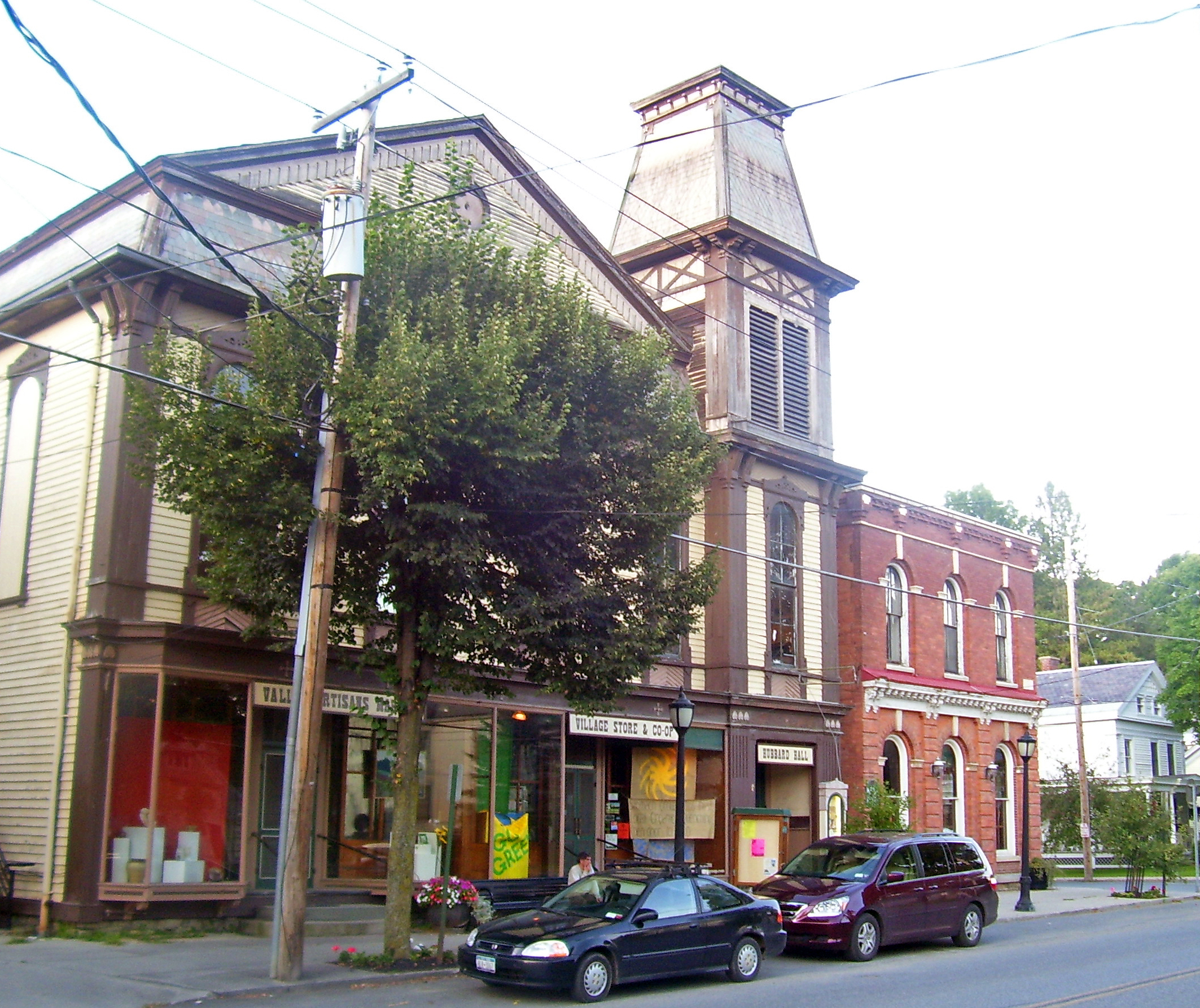
- Hubbard Hall in Cambridge’s downtown historic district

- Location in Washington County and the state of New York.
- Coordinates: 42°59′50″N 73°27′06″W
- Country: United States
- State: New York
- County: Washington

Area
  - Total: 36.51 sq mi (94.56 km^{2})
  - Land: 36.38 sq mi (94.23 km^{2})
  - Water: 0.13 sq mi (0.33 km^{2})

Population (2020)
  - Total: 1,952
- Time zone: UTC-5 (Eastern (EST))
  - Summer (DST): UTC-4 (EDT)
- Area code: 518
- FIPS code: 36-115-11836
- Website: Town website

Cambridge is a town in Washington County, New York, United States. It is part of the Glens Falls Metropolitan Statistical Area. The town population was 1,952 at the 2020 census.

The town of Cambridge contains part of a village, also called Cambridge.

== History ==
Perspective map of Cambridge and list of landmarks from 1886 by L.R. Burleigh

The town of Cambridge, formerly in Albany County, New York, was transferred to Washington County in 1791, shortly after the United States gained independence in the American Revolutionary War.

The eponymous village, incorporated within the township in 1866, was home to the Cambridge Hotel. According to local lore, someone working at the hotel originated the dessert known as pie a la Mode.

== Geography ==
According to the United States Census Bureau, the town has a total area of 36.5 square miles (94.5 km^{2}), of which 36.4 square miles (94.2 km^{2}) is land and 0.1 square mile (0.3 km^{2}) (0.33%) is water.

Part of the southern town line is the border of Rensselaer County.

NY Route 372 passes along the northeastern town line.

=== Places in the town of Cambridge ===
==== Geographical features ====
- Vly Creek – A small stream at the western town line.
- Vly Swamp – A swamp north of Fly Summit.
- Hoosic River – A river marking the southern town line.
- The Cobble – An elevation near North Cambridge.
- Wampecack Creek – A tributary of the Hoosic River, which flows past West Cambridge and South Cambridge.

==== Communities ====
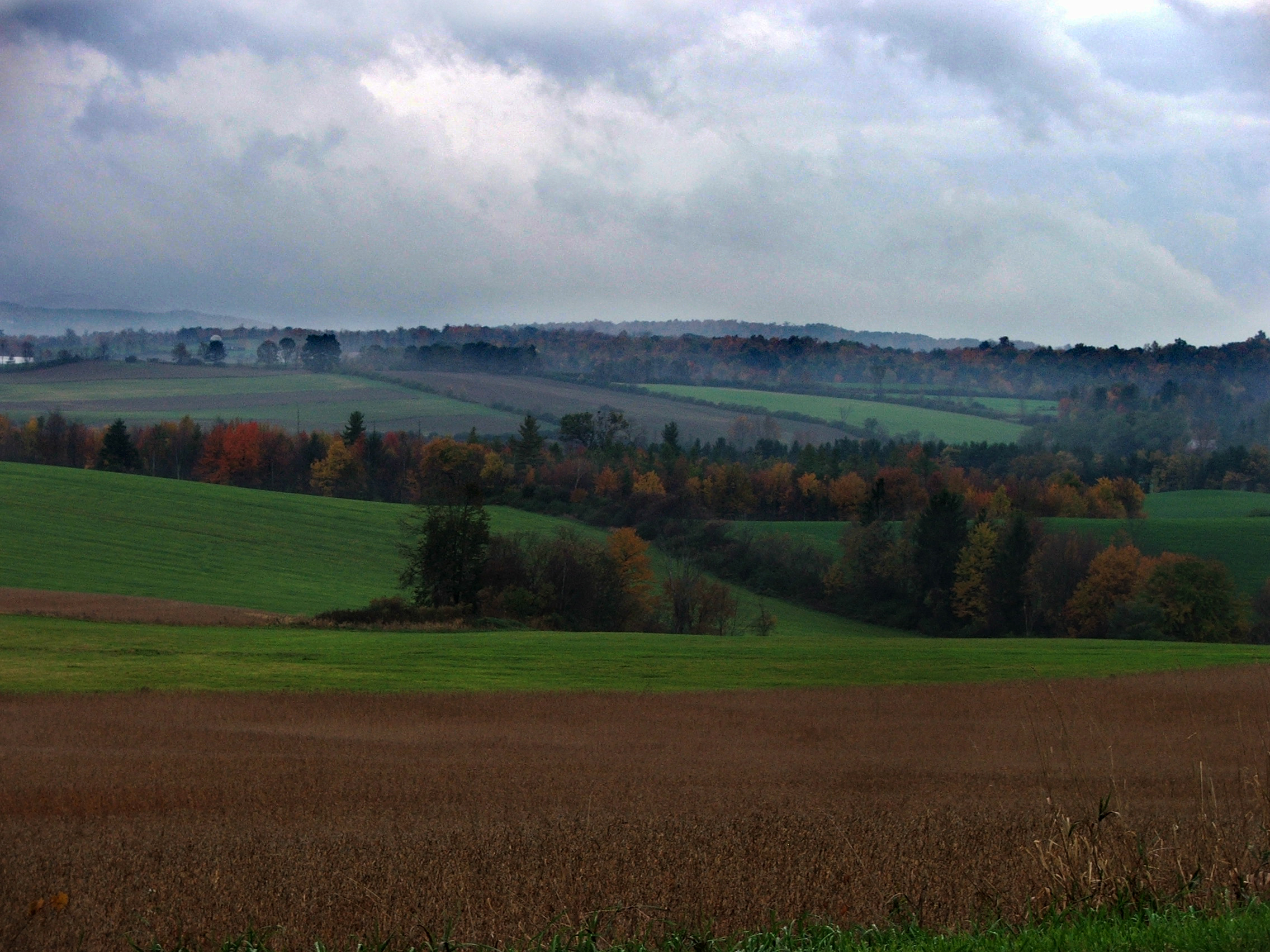
Fields of South Cambridge, NY

- Cambridge – The village of Cambridge, located at the eastern town line.
- Center Cambridge – A hamlet west of Cambridge Village on County Road 59. The Town Offices and Highway garage are located in the hamlet of Center Cambridge.
- Coila – A hamlet on NY-372, northwest of Cambridge village.
- Vly Summit – A location at the western town line, west of North Cambridge on County Road 74.
- Buskirk Bridge – A covered bridge crossing the Hoosic River.
- Lee – A location south of South Cambridge on County Road 74.
- North Cambridge – A hamlet west of Cambridge village, located on County Road 60.
- Oak Hill – A hamlet in the southeastern corner of the town.
- South Cambridge – A hamlet in the southern part of the town on County Road 74.
- West Cambridge – A hamlet near the eastern town line on County Road 74.

== Demographics ==
Historical population
Census	Pop.	Note	%±
1820	2,491		—
1830	2,319		−6.9%
1840	2,005		−13.5%
1850	2,593		29.3%
1860	2,419		−6.7%
1870	2,589		7.0%
1880	2,324		−10.2%
1890	2,162		−7.0%
1900	1,878		−13.1%
1910	1,694		−9.8%
1920	1,620		−4.4%
1930	1,677		3.5%
1940	1,434		−14.5%
1950	1,567		9.3%
1960	1,610		2.7%
1970	1,702		5.7%
1980	1,848		8.6%
1990	1,938		4.9%
2000	2,152		11.0%
2010	2,021		−6.1%
2020	1,952		−3.4%
U.S. Decennial Census

As of the census of 2000, there were 2,152 people, 795 households, and 581 families residing in the town. The population density was 59.2 inhabitants per square mile (22.9/km^{2}). There were 868 housing units at an average density of 23.9 per square mile (9.2/km^{2}). The racial makeup of the town was 97.44% White, 0.84% Black or African American, 0.37% Native American, 0.28% Asian, 0.05% Pacific Islander, 0.42% from other races, and 0.60% from two or more races. Hispanic or Latino of any race were 1.07% of the population.

There were 795 households, out of which 35.7% had children under the age of 18 living with them, 62.5% were married couples living together, 7.0% had a female householder with no husband present, and 26.8% were non-families. 22.0% of all households were made up of individuals, and 10.4% had someone living alone who was 65 years of age or older. The average household size was 2.60 and the average family size was 3.04.

In the town, the population was spread out, with 27.1% under the age of 18, 5.3% from 18 to 24, 26.4% from 25 to 44, 26.4% from 45 to 64, and 14.8% who were 65 years of age or older. The median age was 40 years. For every 100 females, there were 98.5 males. For every 100 females age 18 and over, there were 92.0 males.

The median income for a household in the town was $46,579, and the median income for a family was $50,714. Males had a median income of $32,165 versus $27,667 for females. The per capita income for the town was $21,529. About 3.0% of families and 5.9% of the population were below the poverty line, including 3.7% of those under age 18 and 7.5% of those age 65 or over.

== Education ==
The oldest school in Cambridge is Cambridge Central School, rebuilt in 1950 after a devastating fire. It was the site of the Norman Rockwell painting The Young Lady with the Shiner, also known as Triumph in Defeat and Outside the Principal's Office, which appeared on the cover of The Saturday Evening Post on May 23, 1953. The Cambridge Central School District is a public school district located in Cambridge. It has approximately 900 students in grades PK-12 with a student-teacher ratio of 12 to 1. The average teacher salary is $63,933. 56% of the student body is male, 44% is female. According to state test scores, 50% of students are at least proficient in math and 49% in reading. Seven AP courses are currently offered. Cambridge also offers a BOCES program.

Cambridge's varsity football team held the Class D State Champion title two years in a row, winning in 2016 and 2017. They previously won this title in 1992 and in 1999.

The school also runs an archaeological project excavating the settlement of Daniel Shays that has been ongoing since 2013.

== Notable people ==
- W. J. Abrams, former member of the Wisconsin State Senate and the Wisconsin State Assembly, was Mayor of Green Bay, Wisconsin
- William Buffington Jr., former member of the New York State Assembly
- George Forss, photographer
- Laura James, model, winner of America's Next Top Model cycle 19
- James Lauderdale, Wisconsin State Assemblyman
- Frederick W. Mausert III, Medal of Honor award
