= 1912 United States presidential election =

Election of Woodrow Wilson

- November 5, 1912

531 members of the Electoral College 266 electoral votes needed to win
- Turnout: 58.8% (▼6.9 pp)
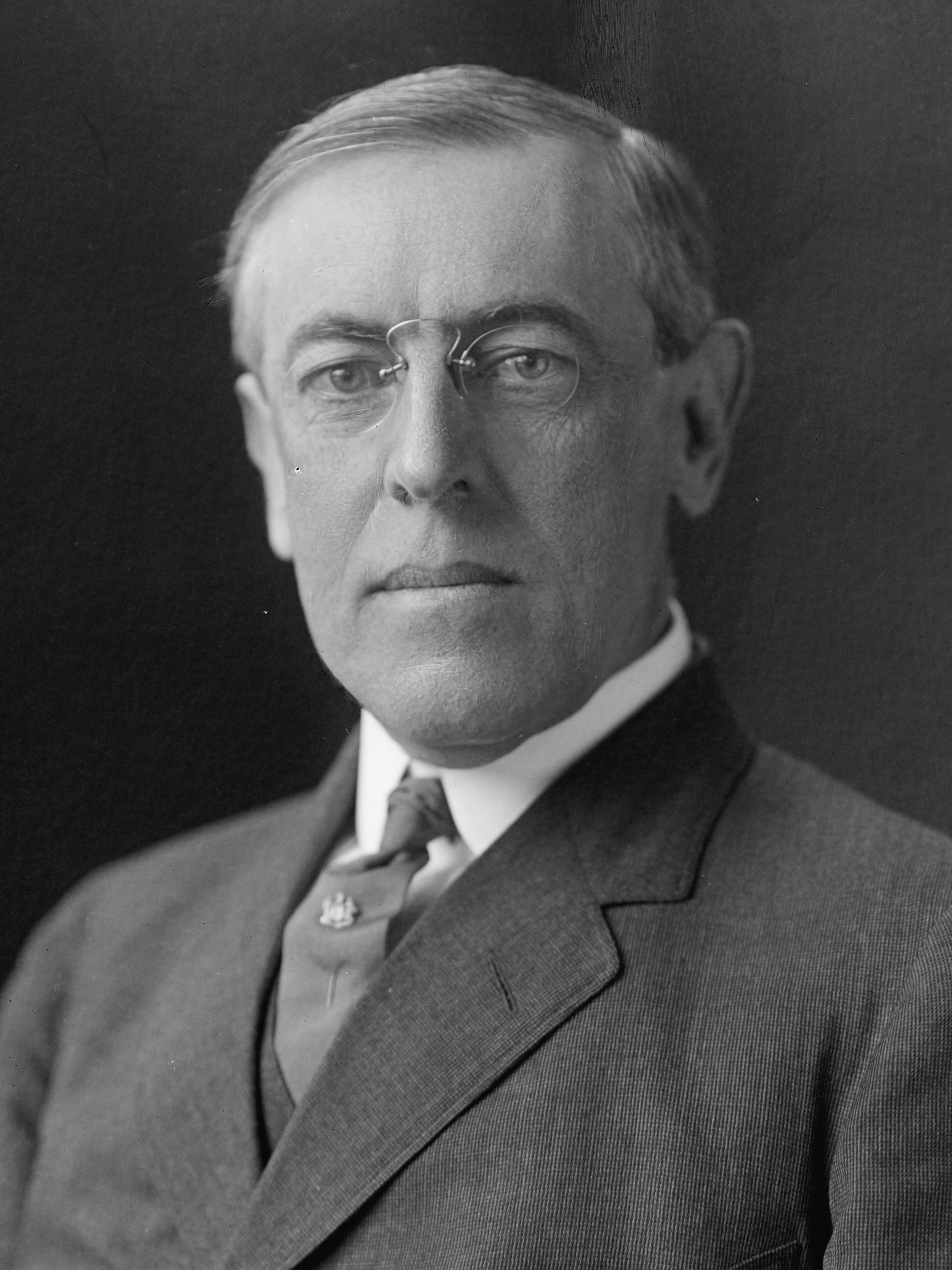

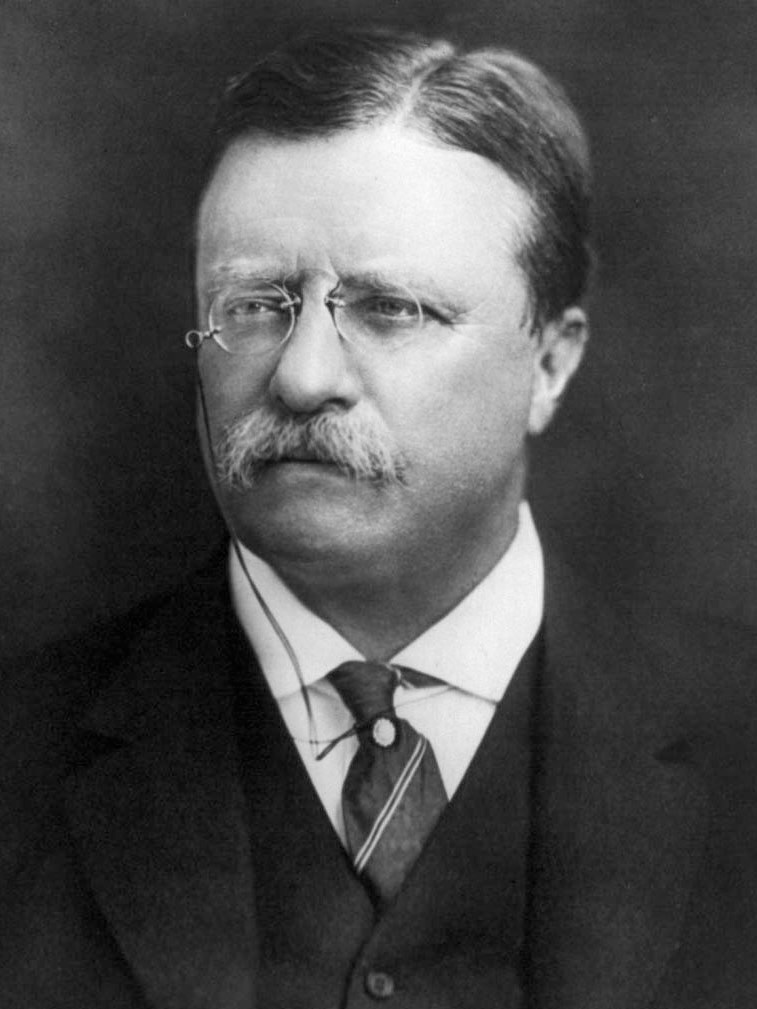

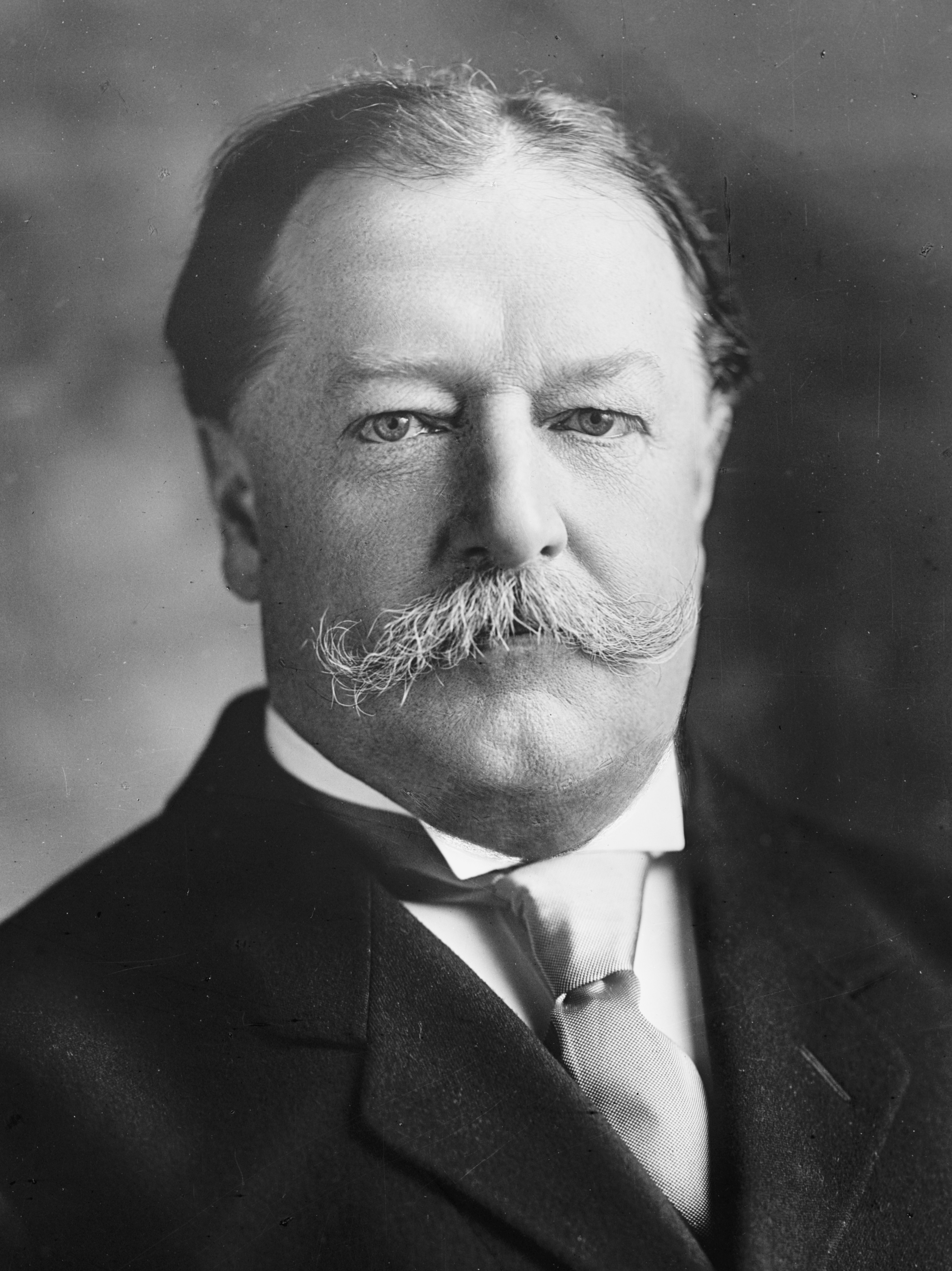

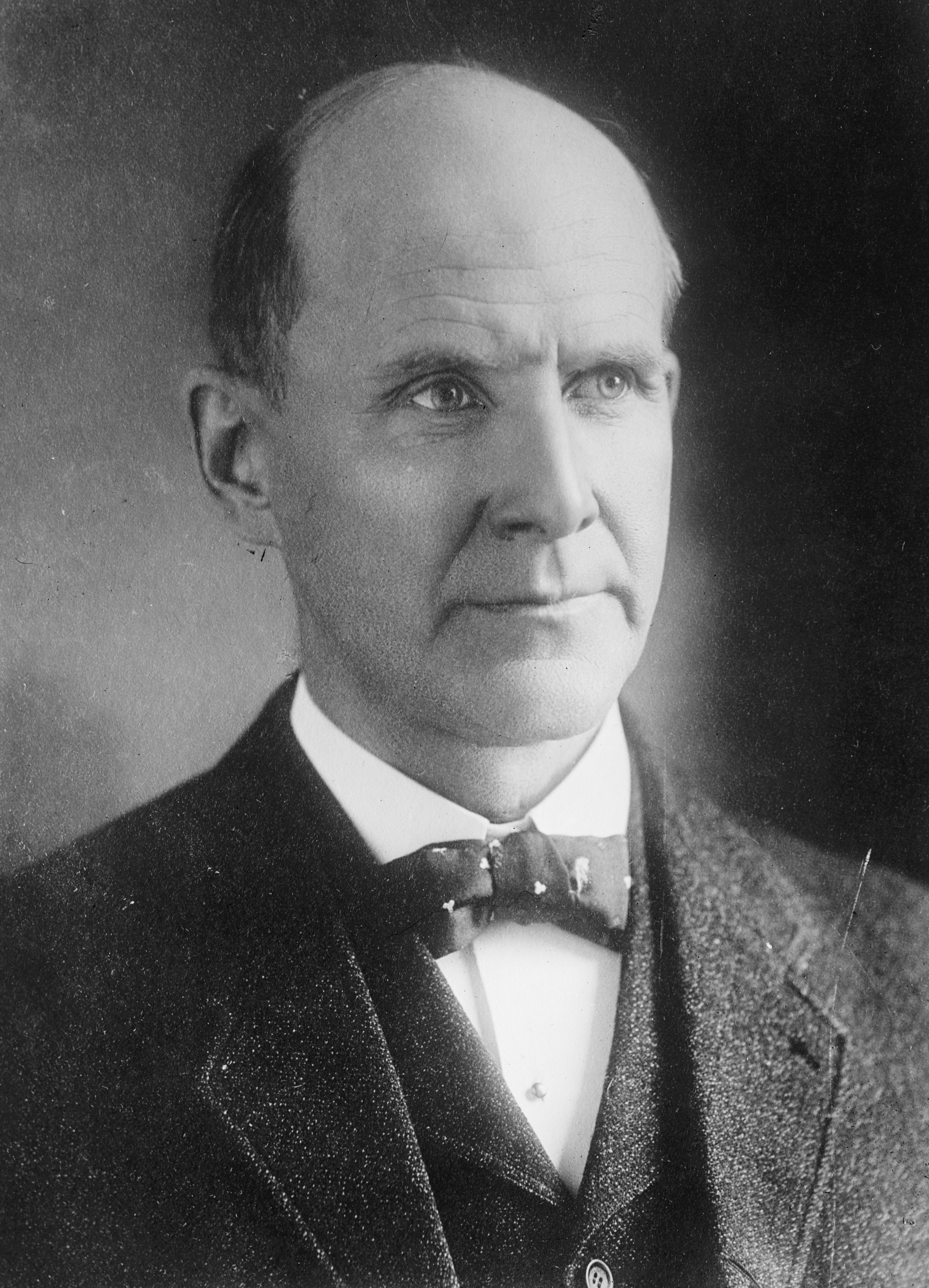
Nominee	Woodrow Wilson	Theodore Roosevelt
Party	Democratic	Progressive
Home state	New Jersey	New York
Running mate	Thomas R. Marshall	Hiram Johnson
Electoral vote	435	88
States carried	40	6
Popular vote	6,296,284	4,122,721
Percentage	41.8%	27.4%
Nominee	William Howard Taft	Eugene V. Debs
Party	Republican	Socialist
Home state	Ohio	Indiana
Running mate	Nicholas Murray; Butler (Note: (replacing James S. Sherman †))	Emil Seidel
Electoral vote	8	0
States carried	2	0
Popular vote	3,486,242	901,551
Percentage	23.2%	6.0%
- Presidential election results map. Blue denotes states won by Wilson/Marshall, light green denotes those won by Roosevelt/Johnson, red denotes those won by Taft/Butler. Numbers indicate the number of electoral votes allotted to each state.
President before election
William Howard Taft
Republican
Elected President
Woodrow Wilson
Democratic

A presidential election was held in the United States on November 5, 1912. The Democratic ticket of governor Woodrow Wilson of New Jersey and governor Thomas Marshall of Indiana defeated the Republican ticket of incumbent President William Howard Taft and university president Nicholas Butler, (Note: Sherman died on October 30, 1912, and Taft did not name another running mate before the 1912 election was held. After the election, the Republican National Committee designated Nicholas Murray Butler as Taft's running mate for the purposes of the electoral vote, and Butler received eight electoral votes) while also defeating the Progressive/"Bull Moose" ticket of former president Theodore Roosevelt and governor Hiram Johnson of California, and the Socialist Party ticket of former Indiana state representative Eugene V. Debs and Milwaukee mayor Emil Seidel.

Roosevelt served as president from 1901 to 1909 as a Republican, and Taft succeeded him with his support. Taft's conservatism angered Roosevelt, so he challenged Taft for the party nomination at the 1912 Republican National Convention. When Taft and his conservative allies narrowly prevailed, Roosevelt rallied his progressive supporters and launched a third-party bid. At the Democratic Convention, Wilson won the presidential nomination on the 46th ballot, defeating Speaker of the House Champ Clark and several other candidates with the support of William Jennings Bryan and other progressive Democrats. The Socialist Party renominated its perennial standard-bearer, Eugene V. Debs.

The general election was bitterly contested by Wilson, Roosevelt, Taft and Debs. Roosevelt's "New Nationalism" platform called for social insurance programs, reduction to an eight-hour workday, and robust federal regulation of the economy. Wilson's "New Freedom" platform called for tariff reduction, banking reform, and new antitrust regulation. Incumbent Taft conducted a subdued campaign based on his platform of "progressive conservatism". Debs, who was attempting to gain widespread support for his socialist policies, claimed that Wilson, Roosevelt and Taft were all financed by different factions within the capitalist trusts, and that Roosevelt in particular was a demagogue using socialistic language in order to divert socialist policies up safe channels for the capitalist establishment.

The Republican split enabled Wilson to win 40 states and a landslide victory in the electoral college with just 41.8% of the popular vote, the lowest vote share for a victorious presidential candidate since 1860. Wilson was the first Democrat to win a presidential election since 1892 as well as the first presidential candidate to receive over 400 electoral votes in a presidential election – he is also the only candidate in any presidential election to receive 400 or more electoral votes without attaining an absolute majority of the popular vote. Roosevelt finished second with 88 electoral votes and 27.4% of the popular vote. Taft took 23.2% of the national vote and carried two states, Vermont and Utah; he won the lowest share of the popular vote of any Republican nominee in history. Debs, the fourth-place finisher, won no electoral votes but received 6% of the popular vote, which remains the highest percentage of the vote ever won by a Socialist candidate in the history of American presidential elections. In this election, more than one third of voters cast third-party votes, the greatest percentage of votes to have ever been cast for third-party candidates in an American presidential election. This was the last U.S. presidential election to date in which the second-placed candidate was neither a Republican nor a Democrat.

== Background ==
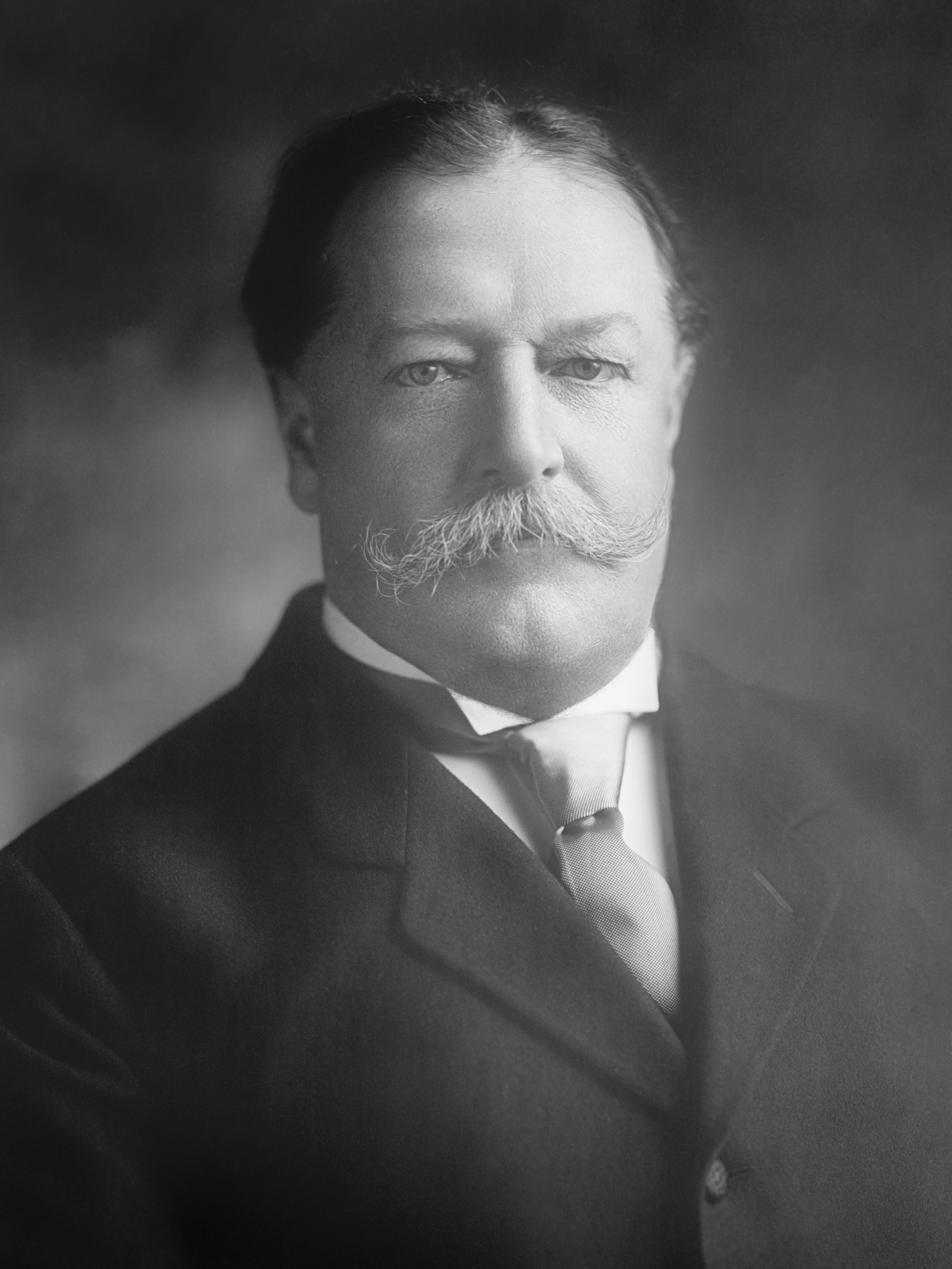
William Howard Taft, the incumbent president in 1912, whose term expired on March 4, 1913

Republican president Theodore Roosevelt had declined to run for re-election in 1908 in fulfillment of a pledge to the American people not to seek a third term. (Note: Though he had become President upon the assassination of William McKinley in 1901, only six months of McKinley's term had elapsed. Thus, Roosevelt had served nearly a full eight years, effectively two full terms. Although the Twenty-second Amendment to the Constitution did not become effective until 1951, it would have barred Roosevelt from seeking another term, since he had served more than two years to which some other person (McKinley) had been elected.) Roosevelt had tapped Secretary of War William Howard Taft to become his successor, and Taft defeated William Jennings Bryan in the 1908 general election.

=== Republican Party split ===
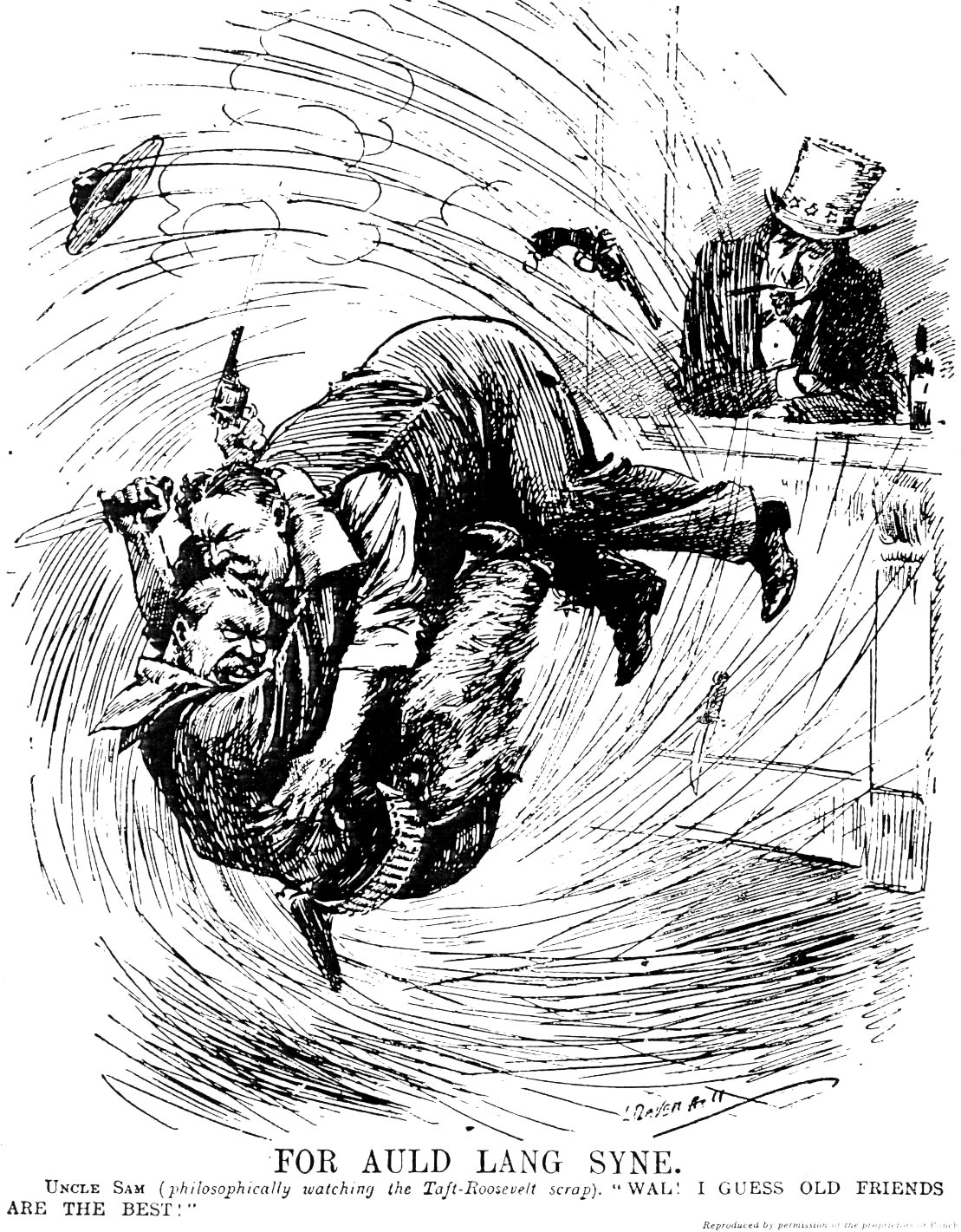
A Punch cartoon by Leonard Raven-Hill, depicting the perceived aggression between Taft and Roosevelt.

During Taft's administration, a rift developed between Roosevelt and Taft, and they became the leaders of the Republican Party's two wings: progressives led by Roosevelt and conservatives led by Taft. Progressives favored labor restrictions protecting women and children, promoted ecological conservation, and were more sympathetic toward labor unions. They also favored the popular election of federal and state judges over appointment by the president or governors. Conservatives supported high tariffs to encourage domestic production, but favored business leaders over labor unions and were generally opposed to the popular election of judges.

==== Taft's policies ====
Cracks in the party began to show when Taft supported the Payne–Aldrich Tariff Act in 1909. The Act favored the industrial Northeast and angered the Northwest and South, where demand was strong for tariff reductions. Early in his term, President Taft had promised to stand for a lower tariff bill, but protectionism had been a major policy of the Republican Party since its founding.

Taft also fought against Roosevelt's antitrust policy. Roosevelt distinguished "good trusts" from "bad trusts", for which he had been lambasted. Taft argued that all monopolies must be broken up. Taft also fired popular conservationist Gifford Pinchot as head of the Bureau of Forestry in 1910. By 1910, the split within the party was deep, and Roosevelt and Taft turned against one another despite their personal friendship. In that summer Roosevelt began a national speaking tour, during which he outlined his progressive philosophy and the New Nationalist platform, which he introduced in a speech in Osawatomie, Kansas, on August 31.

==== Court power and judicial recall ====
Another source of tension involved the authority of the nation's courts, especially the Supreme Court. As early as 1910, Roosevelt had begun criticizing certain court decisions, such as Lochner v. New York (1905), and those jurists whom he dubbed "fossilized judges." He believed that the Supreme Court was interpreting the due process clause of the 14th Amendment and the doctrine of "freedom of contract" to forestall necessary reform legislation, such as the limiting of work hours. He, as well as more populist progressives like William Jennings Bryan in the Democratic Party, came out in favor of an amendment to allow the recall of judges and, possibly, judicial decisions. This outraged Taft (a former judge and future Supreme Court Chief Justice) and other constitutional conservatives, like Elihu Root and Alton B. Parker. Taft considered Roosevelt a danger to constitutional government and resolved to resist his eventual challenge for the Republican nomination.

==== Roosevelt emboldened ====
In the 1910 midterm elections, the Republicans lost 57 seats in the House of Representatives as the Democrats gained a majority for the first time since 1894. These results were a large defeat for the conservative wing of the party. James E. Campbell writes that one cause may have been a large number of progressive voters choosing third-party candidates over conservative Republicans. Roosevelt continued to reject calls to run for president into 1911. In a January letter to newspaper editor William Allen White, he wrote, "I do not think there is one chance in a thousand that it will ever be wise to have me nominated."

However, speculation continued, further harming Roosevelt and Taft's relationship. After months of continually increasing support, Roosevelt changed his position, writing to journalist Henry Beach Needham in January 1912 that if the nomination "comes to me as a genuine public movement of course I will accept."

== Nominations ==
=== Democratic Party nomination ===
Democratic Party (United States) 1912 Democratic Party ticket
Woodrow Wilson	Thomas R. Marshall
for President	for Vice President
34th Governor of New Jersey (1911–1913)	27th Governor of Indiana (1909–1913)
Campaign
BC 122 Delegates; 527,296 votes

==== Other major candidates ====
Candidates in this section are sorted by number of delegates won in the nomination race
Champ Clark	Oscar Underwood	Judson Harmon	Eugene Foss	Thomas Marshall
Speaker of the House from Missouri (1911–1919)	U.S. Congressman from Alabama (1897–1915)	Governor of Ohio (1909–1913)	Governor of Massachusetts (1911–1914)	Governor of Indiana (1909–1913)
Campaign	Campaign	Campaign		Campaign
LN: July 2, 1912; 423 Delegates; 427,938 votes	LN: July 2, 1912; 84 Delegates; 114,947 votes	LN: July 2, 1912; 48 Delegates; 128,633 votes	LN: July 2, 1912; 36 Delegates; 0 votes	LN: July 2, 1912; 30 Delegates; 0 votes
Simeon Baldwin	John Burke			
Governor of Connecticut (1911–1915)	Governor of North Dakota (1907–1913)			
Campaign	Campaign			
LN: July 2, 1912; 14 Delegates; 0 votes	LN: July 2, 1912; 10 Delegates; 9,357 votes			

In early 1912, it was widely believed that three-time Democratic presidential candidate William Jennings Bryan would make a fourth attempt to earn the party's nomination, and would likely not have difficulty in winning it. However, Bryan announced several months before the convention that he was not interested in another run for the White House. Though still seen by many as the Democrats' ideological leader, power shifts within the party in the wake of their success at the 1910 mid-term elections meant that Bryan could no longer be guaranteed the two-thirds majority needed to earn the nomination.

Bryan privately conceded that his three presidential runs having all ended in decisive losses, firstly to William McKinley, and then to Taft, would seriously handicap his credibility as a candidate, even if the 1904 election, the only one of the previous four in which Bryan was not the Democratic candidate, had resulted in an even more lop-sided defeat for the party. However, Bryan still had enough followers in the party that he was in a strong position to be the kingmaker at the convention.

The Democratic National Convention was held in Baltimore from June 25 to July 2. Initially, the front-runner was Speaker of the House Champ Clark of Missouri. Though Clark received the most votes on early ballots, he was unable to get the two-thirds majority required to win. Tammany Hall, the powerful New York City Democratic political machine, anticipated that Clark did not have enough support to wrap up a swift victory, and planted the state's delegates with Ohio governor Judson Harmon, switching its support to Clark on the tenth ballot and giving him a simple majority of the vote. Had Clark been able to make a deal for the delegates of House Majority Leader Oscar Underwood, together with any of the favorite sons still in the contest at that point, he would have won the nomination.

Unbeknownst to either Clark's campaign or Tammany Hall, however, Underwood had in fact already struck a behind-the-scenes deal with Woodrow Wilson, the reformist Governor of New Jersey. Wilson and Underwood were both from the party's progressive wing, and neither wanted Clark, who they both considered to be too pro-business, to take the nomination; the two agreed that if one of them got into a position to win the nomination, the other would withdraw in their favor. More significantly, the Tammany endorsement caused Bryan to turn against Clark, whom he decried as the candidate of Wall Street, and he shifted his support to Wilson, who had consistently finished second in balloting until that point.

Little changed over the next half-dozen ballots, and Wilson briefly considered releasing his delegates and asking them to support Underwood, but he was persuaded to remain in the contest. Starting with the 20th ballot, Clark's delegate total begin to decline, with Wilson slowly but surely gaining at his expense. Wilson took the lead on the 30th ballot, and despite Clark's staying in the contest in the hopes of denying him the two-thirds majority, several state delegations (including Illinois, Virginia, and West Virginia) moved from Clark's column into Wilson's on the 43rd ballot. After two more ballots, Wilson's delegate total reached the point where the support of Underwood's delegates would be sufficient to win the nomination; Underwood honored their agreement and withdrew in favor of Wilson, who won the nomination on the 46h ballot.

Wilson offered the running-mate's slot to Underwood, who declined, preferring to remain in the House of Representatives. Thomas R. Marshall, the governor of Indiana who had swung Indiana's votes to Wilson, was instead named Wilson's running mate.

(1-24)	Presidential Ballot																							
	1st	2nd	3rd	4th	5th	6th	7th	8th	9th	10th	11th	12th	13th	14th	15th	16th	17th	18th	19th	20th	21st	22nd	23rd	24th
Wilson	324	339.75	345	349.5	351	354	352.5	351.5	352.5	350.5	354.5	354	356	361	362.5	362.5	362.5	361	358	388.5	395.5	396.5	399	402.5
Clark	440.5	446.5	441	443	443	445	449.5	448.5	452	556	554	547.5	554.5	553	552	551	545	535	532	512	508	500.5	497.5	496
Harmon	148	141	140.5	136.5	141.5	135	129.5	130	127	31	29	29	29	29	29	29	29	29	29	29	29	0	0	0
Underwood	117.5	111.25	114.5	112	119.5	121	123.5	123	122.5	117.5	118.5	123	115.5	111	110.5	112.5	112.5	125	130	121.5	118.5	115	114.5	115.5
Foss	0	0	0	0	0	0	0	0	0	0	0	0	2	0	0	0	0	0	1	2	5	43	45	43
T. Marshall	31	31	31	31	31	31	31	31	31	31	30	30	30	30	30	30	30	30	30	30	30	30	30	30
Baldwin	22	14	14	14	0	0	0	0	0	0	0	0	0	0	0	0	0	0	0	0	0	0	0	0
W.J. Bryan	1	2	1	0	0	1	1	1	1	1	1	1	1	2	2	1	1	1	7	1	1	1	1	1
Kern	0	0	1	2	2	1	1	1	1	1	1	1	0	2	2	2	4.5	3.5	1	1	1	1	0	0
James	0	0	0	0	0	0	0	1	0	0	0	0	0	0	0	0	0	0	0	3	0	0	0	0
Sulzer	2	2	0	0	0	0	0	0	0	0	0	0	0	0	0	0	0	0	0	0	0	0	0	0
Gaynor	0	0	0	0	0	0	0	1	1	0	0	0	0	0	0	0	0	0	0	0	0	1	1	0
Lewis	0	0	0	0	0	0	0	0	0	0	0	0	0	0	0	0	0	0	0	0	0	0	0	0
Blank	2	0.5	0	0	0	0	0	0	0	0	0	2.5	0	0	0	0	3.5	3.5	0	0	0	0	0	0

(25–46)	Presidential Ballot																						
	25th	26th	27th	28th	29th	30th	31st	32nd	33rd	34th	35th	36th	37th	38th	39th	40th	41st	42nd	43rd	44th	45th	46th	Unanimous
Wilson	405	407.5	406.5	437.5	436	460	475.5	477.5	477.5	479.5	494.5	496.5	496.5	498.5	501.5	501.5	499.5	494	602	629	633	990	1,088
Clark	469	463.5	469	468.5	468.5	455	446.5	446.5	447.5	447.5	433.5	434.5	432.5	425	422	423	424	430	329	306	306	84	
Harmon	29	29	29	29	29	19	17	14	29	29	29	29	29	29	29	28	27	27	28	27	25	12	
Underwood	108	112.5	112	112.5	112	121.5	116.5	119.5	103.5	101.5	101.5	98.5	100.5	106	106	106	106	104	98.5	99	97	0	
Foss	43	43	38	38	38	30	30	28	28	28	28	28	28	28	28	28	28	28	27	27	27	0	
T. Marshall	30	30	30	0	0	0	0	0	0	0	0	0	0	0	0	0	0	0	0	0	0	0	
Baldwin	0	0	0	0	0	0	0	0	0	0	0	0	0	0	0	0	0	0	0	0	0	0	
W.J. Bryan	1	1	1	1	0	0	0	0	0	0	0	0	0	0	0	0	1	0.5	1	0	0	0	
Kern	0	0	0	1	4	2	2	2	2	2	1	1	1	1	1	1	1	1	1	0	0	0	
James	3	0	0	0	0	0	0	0	0	0	0	0	0	0	0	0	0	1	0	0	0	0	
Sulzer	0	0	0	0	0	0	0	0	0	0	0	0	0	0	0	0	0	0	0	0	0	0	
Gaynor	0	0	0	0	0	0	0	0	0	0	0	0	0	0	0	0	1	1	0	0	0	0	
Lewis	0	0	0	0	0	0	0	0	0	0	0	0	0	0	0	0	0	1	0	0	0	0	
Blank	0	1.5	2.5	0.5	0.5	0.5	0.5	0.5	0.5	0.5	0.5	0.5	0.5	0.5	0.5	0.5	0.5	0.5	1.5	0	0	2	

Vice Presidential Ballot
	1st	2nd	Unanimous
Thomas R. Marshall	389	644.5	1,088
John Burke	304.67	386.33	
George E. Chamberlain	157	12.5	
Elmore W. Hurst	78	0	
James H. Preston	58	0	
Martin J. Wade	26	0	
William F. McCombs	18	0	
John E. Osborne	8	0	
William Sulzer	3	0	
Blank	46.33	44.67	

=== Progressive Party nomination ===
Progressive Party (United States, 1912) 1912 Progressive Party ticket
Theodore Roosevelt	Hiram Johnson
for President	for Vice President
26th President of the United States (1901–1909)	23rd Governor of California (1911–1917)

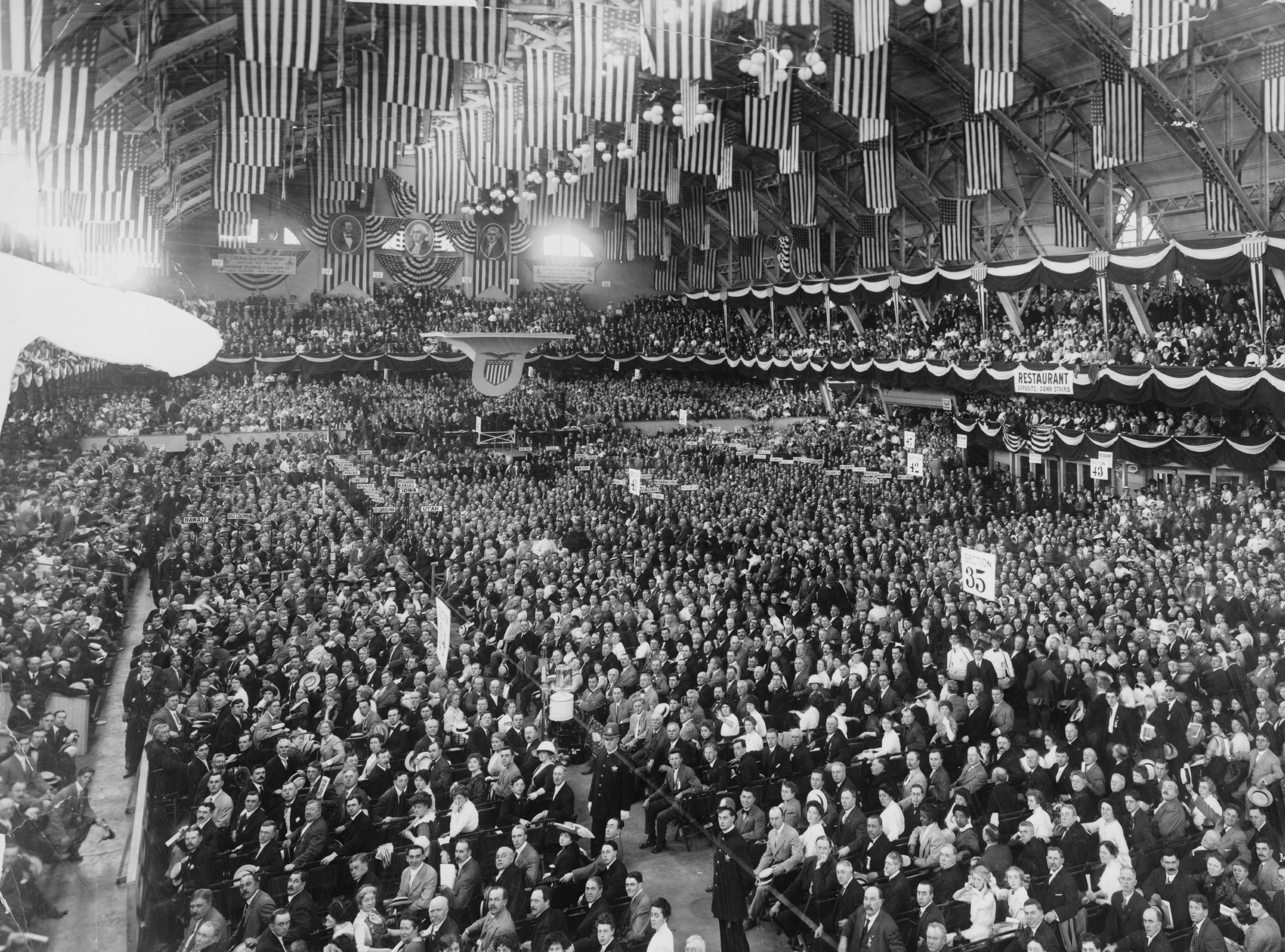
The Progressive convention at the Chicago Coliseum, 1912

Taft had won the Republican nomination while 344 of Roosevelt's delegates abstained from the vote. Later that day supporters of Roosevelt met in the Chicago Orchestra Hall and nominated him as an independent candidate for president which Roosevelt accepted although he requested a formal convention. Roosevelt initially considered not running as a third-party candidate until George Walbridge Perkins and Frank Munsey offered their financial support. Roosevelt and his supporters formed the Progressive Party at a convention, temporarily chaired by Senator Albert J. Beveridge, on August 5, and Hiram Johnson was selected as his vice-presidential running mate. Ben B. Lindsey and John M. Parker had been considered for the presidential nomination, but Parker and Lindsey instead both nominated Johnson for the position.

The Progressives promised to increase federal regulation and protect the welfare of ordinary people. At the convention, Perkins blocked an antitrust plank, shocking reformers who thought of Roosevelt as a true trust-buster. The delegates to the convention sang the hymn "Onward, Christian Soldiers" as their anthem. In his acceptance speech, Roosevelt compared the coming presidential campaign to the Battle of Armageddon and stated that the Progressives were going to "battle for the Lord." The convention made Hiram Johnson a national figure for decades to come, later he would be part of the group of "Irreconcibles" a notable group of Senators, who successfully rallied against the US joining the League of Nations.

=== Republican Party nomination ===
Republican Party (United States) 1912 Republican Party ticket
William Howard Taft	James S. Sherman
for President	for Vice President
27th President of the United States (1909–1913)	27th Vice President of the United States (1909–1912)
Campaign
566 Delegates; 791,425 votes

==== Other major candidates ====
Candidates in this section are sorted by number of delegates won in the nomination race
Theodore Roosevelt	Robert La Follette	Albert Cummins
Fmr. President of the United States from New York (1901–1909)	U.S. Senator from Wisconsin (1906–1925)	U.S. Senator from Iowa (1908–1926)
Campaign	Campaign	Campaign
LN: June 22, 1912; 466 Delegates; 1,183,238 votes	LN: June 22, 1912; 36 Delegates; 336,373 votes	LN: June 22, 1912; 10 Delegates; 0 votes

==== Delegate selection ====
For the first time, many convention delegates were elected in presidential preference primaries. Progressive Republicans advocated primary elections as a way of breaking the control of political parties by bosses. Altogether, 12 states held Republican primaries.

Prior to Roosevelt's entry into the contest, Senator Robert "Fighting Bob" La Follette was seen as the most likely challenger to Taft, but his campaign fell apart early on, firstly due to his giving a poorly-received speech to the Periodical Publishers Banquet on February 2, and then due to his being forced to take a two week break from campaigning due to ill-health. La Follette still won two of the first four primaries (North Dakota and his home state of Wisconsin), but Roosevelt's entry into the contest doomed what little chance he still had. Meanwhile, Taft won a major victory in Roosevelt's home state of New York and continued to rack up delegates in more conservative, traditional state conventions.

Beginning with a runaway victory in Illinois on April 9, Roosevelt won 9 of the last 10 presidential primaries (including Taft's home state of Ohio), losing only Massachusetts.

Taft also had support from the bulk of the Southern Republican organizations. Delegates from the former Confederate states supported Taft by a 5 to 1 margin. These states had voted solidly Democratic in every presidential election since 1880, and Roosevelt objected that they were given one-quarter of the delegates when they would contribute nothing to a Republican victory.

==== Convention ====
Butt, Archibald Willingham. military aide to president Taft. Garden Fete with president and Mrs. Taft

For the Republican National Convention, held June 18–22 in Chicago, 388 delegates were selected through the primaries and Roosevelt won 281 delegates, Taft received 71 delegates, and La Follette received 36 delegates. However, Taft had a 566–466 margin, placing him over the 540 needed for nomination, with the delegations selected at state conventions. Roosevelt accused the Taft faction of having over 200 fraudulently selected delegates. However, the Republican National Committee ruled in favor of Taft for 233 of the delegate cases while 6 were in favor of Roosevelt. The committee reinvestigated the 92 of the contested delegates and ruled in favor of Taft for all of them.

Roosevelt supporters criticized the large amount of delegates coming from areas the Republicans would not win, with over 200 delegates coming from areas that had not been won by a Republican since the Compromise of 1877, or the four delegates that came from the territories which didn't vote in the general election. However, Roosevelt had rejected an attempt to abolish delegations from the south at the 1908 Republican National Convention due to him needing them for Taft's nomination.

Herbert S. Hadley served as Roosevelt's floor manager at the convention. Hadley made a motion for 74 of Taft's delegates to be replaced by 72 delegates after the reading of the convention call, but his motion was ruled out of order. Elihu Root, a supporter of Taft, was selected to chair the convention after winning 558 votes against McGovern's 501 votes. Root was accused of having won through the rotten boroughs of the southern delegations as every northern state, except for four, voted for McGovern. In his closing speech, Root reiterated the party's support of "constitutional checks and limitations" by quoting figures like Alexander Hamilton, John Marshall, and Abraham Lincoln, effectively rebuking Roosevelt's support of the judicial recall and identifying the GOP with constitutional conservatism.

Roosevelt broke with tradition and attended the convention, where he was welcomed with great support from voters. Despite Roosevelt's presence in Chicago and his attempts to disqualify Taft supporters, the incumbent ticket of Taft and James S. Sherman was renominated on the first ballot. Sherman was the first sitting vice president re-nominated since John C. Calhoun in 1828. After losing the vote, Roosevelt announced the formation of a new party dedicated "to the service of all the people." This would later come to be known as the Progressive Party. Roosevelt announced that his party would hold its convention in Chicago and that he would accept their nomination if offered. Meanwhile, Taft decided not to campaign before the election beyond his acceptance speech on August 1. Warren G. Harding presented Taft's name for the nomination. Taft won the nomination while 344 of Roosevelt's delegates abstained from the vote. Henry Justin Allen read a speech from Roosevelt in which he criticized the process and stated that delegates had been stolen from his in order to secure Taft's nomination.

Presidential Ballot
William Howard Taft	561
Theodore Roosevelt	107
Robert M. La Follette	41
Albert B. Cummins	17
Charles Evans Hughes	2
Present, not voting	344
Absent	6

Vice Presidential Ballot
James S. Sherman	596
William Borah	21
Charles Edward Merriam	20
Herbert S. Hadley	14
Albert J. Beveridge	2

=== Socialist Party nomination ===
Socialist Party of America 1912 Socialist Party ticket
Eugene V. Debs	Emil Seidel
for President	for Vice President
Indiana state representative (1885–1887)	36th Mayor of Milwaukee (1910–1912)

Socialist candidates:

- Eugene V. Debs, former Indiana state representative from Indiana
- Emil Seidel, Mayor of Milwaukee, Wisconsin
- Charles Edward Russell, journalist from New York

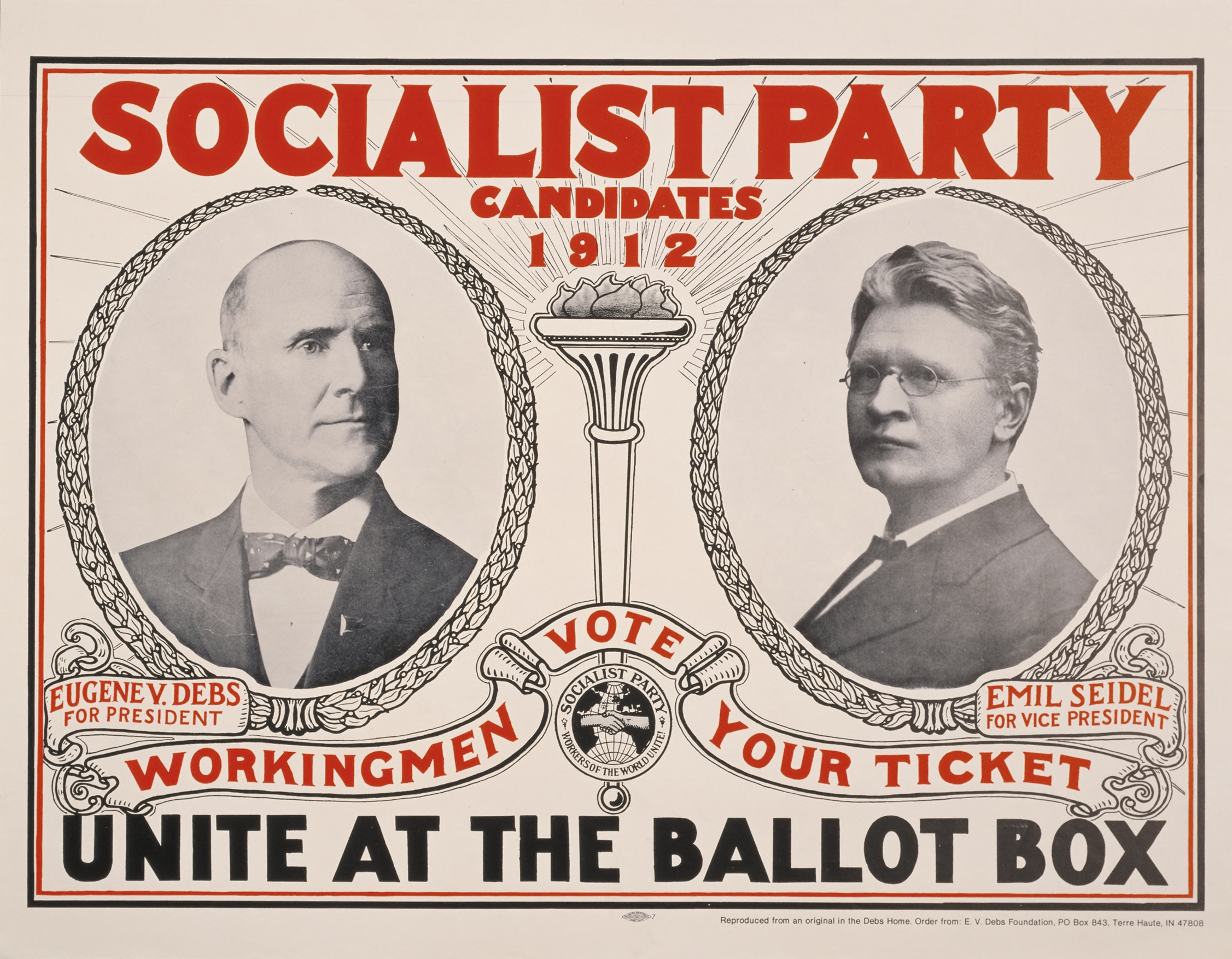
Eugene V. Debs's popular vote results were the highest for the Socialist Party.

Members of the Socialist Party of America had won in multiple elections between the 1908 and 1912 presidential elections with Emil Seidel being elected as the mayor of Milwaukee, Wisconsin, and Victor L. Berger was elected to the United States House of Representatives. The party claimed that it had 435 members elected to office by 1911, and over one thousand by 1912.

Dan Hogan put Debs name up for the presidential nomination. Debs won the presidential nomination, although he had supported giving the nomination to the Appeal to Reason's editor Fred Warren, with 165 votes while Seidel received 56 votes and Charles Edward Russell received 54 votes. Seidel was given the vice-presidential nomination against Russell and Hogan.

After the presidential ballot Seidel and Russell proposed a motion to make Debs' nomination unanimous and it was accepted. Hogan and Slayton proposed to make the nomination of Seidel unanimous after the vice-presidential selection and it was accepted. Otto Branstetter, Berger, and Carl D. Thompson, who were serving as delegates, voted for Seidel during the presidential balloting. Morris Hillquit, Meyer London, and John Spargo, who were serving as delegates, supported Russell during the presidential balloting. Hogan, a delegate from Arkansas, had supported Debs during the presidential balloting.

J. Mahlon Barnes, who had managed Debs' campaign in the 1908 election, also managed the campaign in 1912. The Socialists predicted that they would receive over two million votes and have 12 members elected to Congress, but Debs only received 897,011 votes and Berger lost reelection. Debs received his largest number of votes from Ohio while his best percentage was in Nevada. The largest percentage gain since the 1908 presidential election was in West Virginia where their vote total increased by over 300%. George Brinton McClellan Harvey stated that had Roosevelt not run then Debs would have gained an additional half a million votes. The number of Socialists in the state legislatures increased from 20 to 21.

Presidential ballot	1st ballot	2nd ballot	Vice-presidential ballot	1st ballot	2nd ballot
Eugene V. Debs	165	Unanimous	Emil Seidel	159	Unanimous
Emil Seidel	56		Dan Hogan	73	
Charles Edward Russell	54		John W. Slayton	24	
Reference					

== General election ==
Roosevelt conducted a vigorous national campaign for the Progressive Party, denouncing the way the Republican nomination had been "stolen". He bundled together his reforms under the rubric of "The New Nationalism" and stumped the country for a strong federal role in regulating the economy and chastising bad corporations. Roosevelt rallied progressives with speeches denouncing the political establishment. He promised "an expert tariff commission, wholly removed from the possibility of political pressure or of improper business influence."

Wilson supported a policy called "The New Freedom". This policy was based mostly on individualism instead of a strong government.

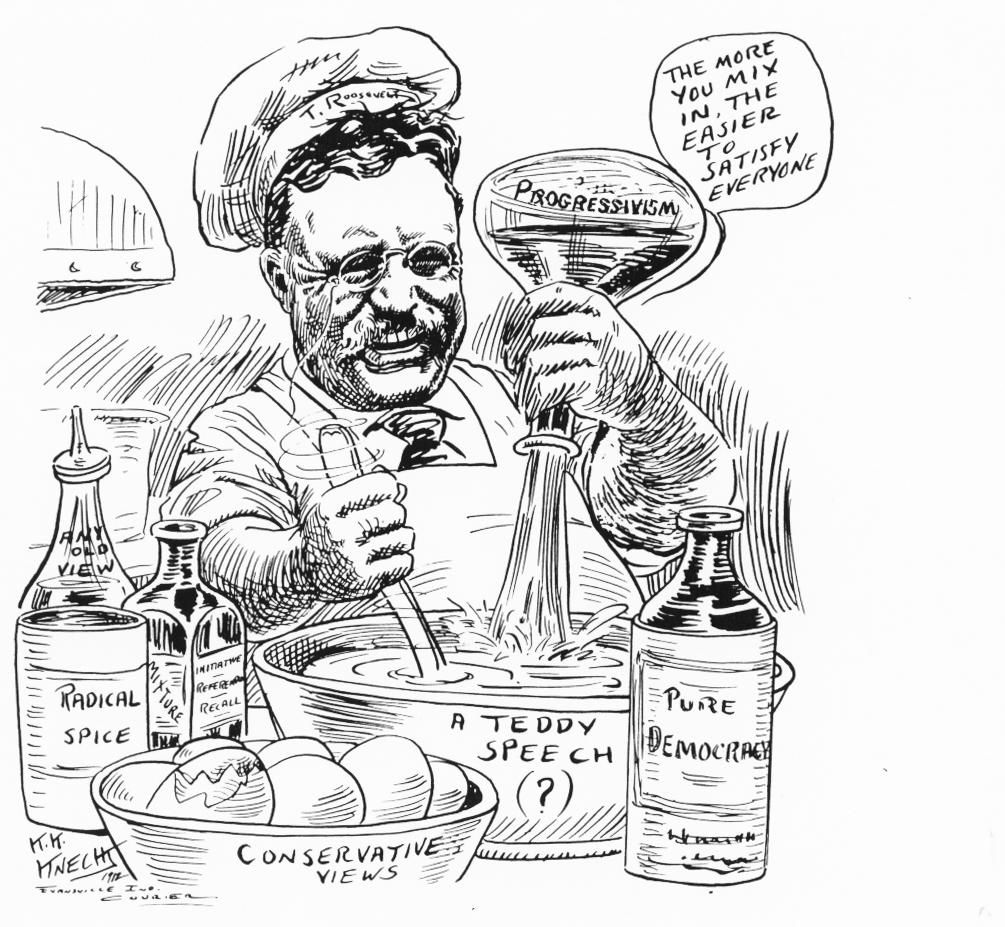
A Republican editorial cartoon depicts Roosevelt mixing "radical" ingredients in his speeches.

Wilson opposed Roosevelt's proposal to establish a powerful state bureaucracy charged with regulating large corporations, with Wilson instead favoring the break-up of large corporations in order to create a level economic playing field. Though Wilson's rhetoric paid homage to the traditional Democratic Party skepticisms of government and "collectivism", after his election win Wilson would embrace some of the progressive reforms which Roosevelt had campaigned on.

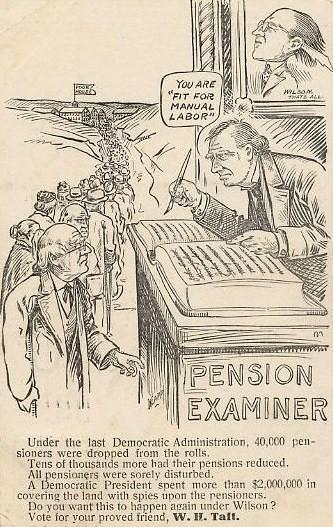
A Republican campaign postcard charges a Wilson administration would force pensioners back to work.

Taft campaigned quietly and spoke of the need for judges to be more powerful than elected officials. The departure of the progressives left the Republican Party firmly controlled by the conservative wing. Much of the Republican effort was designed to discredit Roosevelt as a dangerous radical, but this had little effect. Many of the nation's pro-Republican newspapers depicted Roosevelt as an egotist running only to spoil Taft's chances and feed his vanity.

The Socialists had little funding compared to the Republican, Democratic and Progressive campaigns. Debs' campaign spent only $66,000, mostly on 3.5 million leaflets and travel to locally organized rallies. Debs' biggest event was a speech to 15,000 supporters in New York City. The crowd sang "La Marseillaise" and "The Internationale." Debs's running mate Emil Seidel boasted:

Only a year ago workingmen were throwing decayed vegetables and rotten eggs at us but now all is changed... Eggs are too high. There is a great giant growing up in this country that will someday take over the affairs of this nation. He is a little giant now but he is growing fast. The name of this little giant is socialism.

Debs claimed that there was no hope under the present decaying capitalist system, and that the worker who votes the Republican or Democratic ticket does worse than throw away his vote, as he is a deserter of his class and becomes his own worst enemy. Debs insisted that Democrats, Progressives, and Republicans alike were financed by different factions within the capitalist trusts, and that only the Socialists represented labor. Debs condemned "Injunction Bill Taft" and condemned Roosevelt for stealing his socialist clothes with the intent to make socialist policies "safer" for the establishment.

At a campaign speech in Philadelphia on September 28, 1912, Debs said of Roosevelt:

Theodore Roosevelt now alludes to me as "Brother Debs". I do not acknowledge the new relation. I still wish to be the undesirable citizen in his eyes. If he knew me then, I know him now. I know what he stands for and what his methods are. I know he is the enemy of the workers. I know he is now trying to deceive that class to further his own selfish ambition — to get back into the White House and if possible remain there for life.

=== Attempted assassination of Theodore Roosevelt ===
Running on a platform he first declared in 1910, which later became formalized under the name of "New Nationalism", Theodore Roosevelt spent part of 1910, 1911, and finally full time in 1912 campaigning to win back the presidency. When it became clear his leftward political shift and the Republican Party were incompatible, a new party was spun up called The Bull Moose Party. Campaigning under the banner of the Bull Moose, Roosevelt was at a campaign stop in Milwaukee on October 14, John Schrank, a saloonkeeper from New York, shot Roosevelt in the chest. The bullet penetrated his steel eyeglass case and a 50-page single-folded copy of his speech Progressive Cause Greater Than Any Individual and became lodged in his chest. Schrank was immediately disarmed and captured. Schrank had been stalking Roosevelt. He was suffering from delusion and said the ghost of President McKinley ordered him to kill Roosevelt to prevent a third term.

Roosevelt shouted for Schrank to remain unharmed and assured the crowd he was all right, then ordered police to take charge of Schrank and ensure no violence was done to him. Roosevelt, an experienced hunter and anatomist, correctly concluded that since he was not coughing blood, the bullet had not reached his lung. He declined suggestions to go to the hospital and instead delivered his scheduled speech with blood seeping into his shirt. His opening comments to the gathered crowd were, "Ladies and gentlemen, I don't know whether you fully understand that I have just been shot, but it takes more than that to kill a bull moose." He spoke for 90 minutes before completing his speech and accepting medical attention.

Afterward, probes and an x-ray showed that the bullet had lodged in Roosevelt's chest muscle, but did not penetrate the pleura. Doctors concluded that it would be less dangerous to leave it in place than to attempt to remove it, and Roosevelt carried the bullet with him for the rest of his life.

Taft was not campaigning and focused on his presidential duties. Wilson briefly suspended his campaigning. By October 17, Wilson was back on the campaign trail but avoided any criticism of Roosevelt or his party. Roosevelt spent two weeks recuperating before returning to the campaign trail with a major speech on October 30, designed to reassure his supporters he was strong enough for the presidency.

=== Death of Vice President Sherman ===
On October 30, 1912, Vice President James S. Sherman died of nephritis, leaving Taft without a running mate less than a week before the election. Nicholas Murray Butler, president of Columbia University, was quickly chosen to replace Sherman on the Republican ticket.

== Results ==
Election Night Victory Speech
- “We must have the quietest temper in what we are going to do. We must not let any man divert us. We must have quiet temper and yet be resolute of purpose. But let us hear them all patiently, and yet, hearing all, let us not be diverted. You men must play a great part. I plead with you again to look constantly forward. I summon you for the rest of your lives to support the men who like myself want to carry the nation forward to its highest destiny and greatness.” — Woodrow Wilson Victory Address to Princeton Undergraduates delivered from his porch on Cleveland Lane (November 5, 1912)

Turnout in the election was 59%, with 27.9% of the voting age population participating in the election. Wilson captured the presidency handily by carrying a record 40 states. This election saw the lowest turnout among eligible voters since the 1836 presidential election, falling 20 points short of the turnout in the 1896 election. The implementation of Jim Crow laws after the Reconstruction Era significantly reduced Black voter turnout.

Wilson won the presidency with a lower percentage of the popular vote than any candidate since Abraham Lincoln in 1860. Taft's result remains the worst performance for any incumbent president, both in terms of electoral votes (8) and share of popular votes (23.17%). His 8 electoral votes remain the fewest by a Republican and by any major-party candidate, matched by Alf Landon's 1936 campaign. His 23.17% of the popular vote is the lowest ever for a Republican or any major party nominee.

This was the first time since 1852 that Iowa, Maine, New Hampshire, Ohio, and Rhode Island voted for a Democrat, and the first time in history that Massachusetts voted Democratic. Democrats would not win Maine again until 1964, Connecticut and Delaware until 1936, Illinois, Indiana, Iowa, New Jersey, New York, Oregon, West Virginia, and Wisconsin until 1932, and Massachusetts and Rhode Island until 1928. Additionally, it was the last time until 1932 that the Republicans failed to win Michigan, Minnesota, and South Dakota. This is one of two times since 1852 that Maine and Vermont did not support the same party (the other being in 1968). Theodore Roosevelt's 88 electoral votes and 27.4% of the popular vote are the highest won by a third party in a presidential election.

Wilson's raw vote total and percentage were less than William Jennings Bryan's total in any of his three campaigns. In only two regions, New England and the Pacific, was Wilson's vote greater than the greatest Bryan vote. The 1912 election was the first to include all 48 of the current contiguous United States. This was the first election since 1864, where the winner's home state was not Ohio or New York.

Only 12 of the 48 states saw a candidate win with a majority of the popular vote. Wilson won a majority in the 11 former Confederate states. Only South Dakota, where Taft did not appear on the ballot, gave Roosevelt a majority. Taft won only two states, Vermont and Utah, each with a plurality. This is the only time in American history that three people who at some point served as president ran for president in the same election, though in 1920 and 1960 three future presidents ran for either president or vice-president. This was the last election where the winning presidential ticket featured two incumbent governors, with Wilson and his running mate Thomas R. Marshall being the incumbent governors of New Jersey and Indiana, respectively.

Wilson finished 1st in 40 states. He finished 2nd behind Roosevelt in 5 states, and 2nd behind Taft only in Utah. He finished 3rd in 2 states, in Michigan where Roosevelt finished 1st and Taft finished 2nd, and in Vermont where Taft finished 1st and Roosevelt finished 2nd.

Roosevelt would win the most electoral votes out of any third-party candidate in American history, finishing 1st in 6 states. He finished 2nd in 24 states, behind Wilson in 23, and behind Taft in Vermont. He finished 3rd in 17 states. In 15 of those, Wilson finished 1st and Taft finished 2nd. In the other two, Taft finished 1st and Wilson finished 2nd in Utah, while Wilson finished 1st and Debs finished 2nd in Florida. Roosevelt was not on the ballot in Oklahoma.

Taft finished 1st in Vermont and Utah. He finished 2nd in 18 states, behind Wilson in 17 of those. The one exception was Michigan where Taft finished 2nd behind Roosevelt. He finished 3rd in 21 states. In 18 of those, Wilson finished 1st and Roosevelt finished 2nd. In the other 3, Minnesota, Pennsylvania, and Washington, Roosevelt finished 1st and Wilson finished 2nd. Taft also finished 4th in 5 states. In 4 of those, the top 3 in order were Wilson-Roosevelt-Debs. In Florida, Wilson finished 1st, Debs finished 2nd, and Roosevelt finished 3rd. While not on the ballot in California, Taft received 3,914 write-in votes in the state, placing him 5th, behind Roosevelt, Wilson, Debs, and Chafin. Taft was not on the ballot at all in South Dakota, not even as a write-in option.

Debs finished 2nd in Florida behind Wilson. He finished 3rd in 7 states. In Nevada, Arizona, Louisiana and Mississippi, Wilson finished 1st, Roosevelt finished 2nd, Debs finished 3rd and Taft finished 4th. The other 3 states where Debs finished 3rd were Oklahoma, where Roosevelt was not on the ballot; South Dakota, where Taft was not on the ballot; and California, where Taft was not on the ballot, but received write-in votes, causing Taft to finish 5th in California. Debs finished 4th in 38 states. Debs was beaten by Chafin in two states, Vermont and Delaware, with Debs finishing 5th in both states.

Chafin finished last in 18 states. The states where Chafin avoided finishing last were 19 of the 20 states where Reimer was on the ballot – Reimer finished last in all 20 states that he contested – as well as Vermont and Delaware, where Chafin managed to force Debs into last place. The other state where Chafin avoided last place was California, where Taft was only a write-in candidate and finished last. Reimer was not on the ballot in 28 states, while Chafin was not on the ballot in 8 states. Only in Utah was Reimer on the ballot but Chafin was not. The eleven states of the former Confederacy provided 5.44% of Taft's votes, with him taking 12.22% of the vote in that region while Roosevelt took 16.76%.

=== County results ===
In a plurality of 1,396 counties, no candidate obtained a majority. Wilson won 1,969 counties but held a majority in only 1,237, less than Bryan had had in any of his campaigns.

"Other(s)", mostly Roosevelt, won a plurality in 772 counties and a majority in 305 counties. Most of them in Pennsylvania (48), Illinois (33), Michigan (68), Minnesota (75), Iowa (49), South Dakota (54), Nebraska (32), Kansas (51), Washington (38), and California (44).

Debs carried four counties: Lake and Beltrami in Minnesota, Burke in North Dakota, and Crawford in Kansas. These are the only counties ever to vote for the Socialist presidential nominee.

Taft won a plurality in only 232 counties and a majority in only 35. In addition to South Dakota and California, where there was no Taft ticket, Taft carried no counties in Maine, New Jersey, Minnesota, Nevada, Arizona, and seven "Solid South" states. Nine counties did not record any votes due to either black disenfranchisement or being inhabited only by Native Americans, who would not gain full citizenship for 12 more years.

Electoral results
Presidential candidate	Party	Home state	Popular vote		Electoral vote	Running mate		
Presidential candidate	Party	Home state	Count	Percentage	Electoral vote	Vice-presidential candidate	Home state	Electoral vote
Woodrow Wilson	Democratic	New Jersey	6,296,284	41.84%	435	Thomas R. Marshall	Indiana	435
Theodore Roosevelt	Progressive	New York	4,122,721	27.40%	88	Hiram Johnson	California	88
William Howard Taft (incumbent)	Republican	Ohio	3,486,242	23.17%	8	Nicholas Murray Butler	New York	8
Eugene V. Debs	Socialist	Indiana	901,551	5.99%	0	Emil Seidel	Wisconsin	0
Eugene W. Chafin	Prohibition	Arizona	208,156	1.38%	0	Aaron S. Watkins	Ohio	0
Arthur E. Reimer	Socialist Labor	Massachusetts	29,324	0.19%	0	August Gillhaus	New York	0
Other			4,556	0.03%	—	Other		—
Total			15,048,834	100%	531			531
Needed to win					266			266

Popular vote
Wilson	41.84%
Roosevelt	27.40%
Taft	23.17%
Debs	5.99%
Others	1.60%

Electoral vote
Wilson	81.92%
Roosevelt	16.57%
Taft	1.51%

Source (Popular Vote): Leip, David. "1912 Presidential Election Results". Dave Leip's Atlas of U.S. Presidential Elections.

Source (Electoral Vote): "Electoral College Box Scores 1789–1996". National Archives and Records Administration.

=== Results by state ===
States/districts won by Wilson/Marshall
States/districts won by Roosevelt/Johnson
States/districts won by Taft/Butler

		Woodrow Wilson Democratic			Theodore Roosevelt Progressive "Bull Moose"			William H. Taft Republican			Eugene V. Debs Socialist			Eugene Chafin Prohibition			Arthur Reimer Socialist Labor			Margin		State Total	
State	electoral votes	#	%	electoral votes	#	%	electoral votes	#	%	electoral votes	#	%	electoral votes	#	%	electoral votes	#	%	electoral votes	#	%	#	
Alabama	12	82,438	69.89	12	22,680	19.23	-	9,807	8.31	-	3,029	2.57	-	-	-	-	-	-	-	59,758	50.66	117,959	AL
Arizona	3	10,324	43.52	3	6,949	29.29	-	3,021	12.74	-	3,163	13.33	-	265	1.12	-	-	-	-	3,375	14.23	23,722	AZ
Arkansas	9	68,814	55.01	9	21,644	17.30	-	25,585	20.45	-	8,153	6.52	-	908	0.73	-	-	-	-	43,229	34.55	125,104	AR
California	13	283,436	41.81	2	283,610	41.83	11	3,914	0.58	-	79,201	11.68	-	23,366	3.45	-	-	-	-	-174	-0.03	673,527	CA
Colorado	6	114,232	42.80	6	72,306	27.09	-	58,386	21.88	-	16,418	6.15	-	5,063	1.90	-	475	0.18	-	41,926	15.71	266,880	CO
Connecticut	7	74,561	39.16	7	34,129	17.92	-	68,324	35.88	-	10,056	5.28	-	2,068	1.09	-	1,260	0.66	-	6,237	3.28	190,398	CT
Delaware	3	22,631	46.48	3	8,886	18.25	-	15,998	32.85	-	556	1.14	-	623	1.28	-	-	-	-	6,633	13.62	48,694	DE
Florida	6	35,343	69.52	6	4,555	8.96	-	4,279	8.42	-	4,806	9.45	-	1,854	3.65	-	-	-	-	30,537	60.07	50,837	FL
Georgia	14	93,087	76.63	14	21,985	18.10	-	5,191	4.27	-	1,058	0.87	-	149	0.12	-	-	-	-	71,102	58.53	121,470	GA
Idaho	4	33,921	32.08	4	25,527	24.14	-	32,810	31.02	-	11,960	11.31	-	1,536	1.45	-	-	-	-	1,111	1.05	105,754	ID
Illinois	29	405,048	35.34	29	386,478	33.72	-	253,593	22.13	-	81,278	7.09	-	15,710	1.37	-	4,066	0.35	-	18,570	1.62	1,146,173	IL
Indiana	15	281,890	43.07	15	162,007	24.75	-	151,267	23.11	-	36,931	5.64	-	19,249	2.94	-	3,130	0.48	-	119,883	18.32	654,474	IN
Iowa	13	185,325	37.64	13	161,819	32.87	-	119,805	24.33	-	16,967	3.45	-	8,440	1.71	-	-	-	-	23,506	4.77	492,356	IA
Kansas	10	143,663	39.30	10	120,210	32.88	-	74,845	20.47	-	26,779	7.33	-	-	-	-	-	-	-	23,453	6.42	365,497	KS
Kentucky	13	219,484	48.48	13	101,766	22.48	-	115,510	25.52	-	11,646	2.57	-	3,253	0.72	-	1,055	0.23	-	103,974	22.97	452,714	KY
Louisiana	10	60,871	76.81	10	9,283	11.71	-	3,833	4.84	-	5,261	6.64	-	-	-	-	-	-	-	51,588	65.10	79,248	LA
Maine	6	51,113	39.43	6	48,495	37.41	-	26,545	20.48	-	2,541	1.96	-	946	0.73	-	-	-	-	2,618	2.02	129,640	ME
Maryland	8	112,674	48.57	8	57,789	24.91	-	54,956	23.69	-	3,996	1.72	-	2,244	0.97	-	322	0.14	-	54,885	23.66	231,981	MD
Massachusetts	18	173,408	35.53	18	142,228	29.14	-	155,948	31.95	-	12,616	2.58	-	2,754	0.56	-	1,102	0.23	-	17,460	3.58	488,056	MA
Michigan	15	150,751	27.36	-	214,584	38.95	15	152,244	27.63	-	23,211	4.21	-	8,934	1.62	-	1,252	0.23	-	-62,340	-11.31	550,976	MI
Minnesota	12	106,426	31.84	-	125,856	37.66	12	64,334	19.25	-	27,505	8.23	-	7,886	2.36	-	2,212	0.66	-	-19,430	-5.81	334,219	MN
Mississippi	10	57,324	88.90	10	3,549	5.50	-	1,560	2.42	-	2,050	3.18	-	-	-	-	-	-	-	53,775	83.39	64,483	MS
Missouri	18	330,746	47.35	18	124,375	17.80	-	207,821	29.75	-	28,466	4.07	-	5,380	0.77	-	1,778	0.25	-	122,925	17.60	698,566	MO
Montana	4	27,941	35.00	4	22,456	28.13	-	18,512	23.19	-	10,885	13.64	-	32	0.04	-	-	-	-	5,485	6.87	79,826	MT
Nebraska	8	109,008	43.69	8	72,681	29.13	-	54,226	21.74	-	10,185	4.08	-	3,383	1.36	-	-	-	-	36,327	14.56	249,483	NE
Nevada	3	7,986	39.70	3	5,620	27.94	-	3,196	15.89	-	3,313	16.47	-	-	-	-	-	-	-	2,366	11.76	20,115	NV
New Hampshire	4	34,724	39.48	4	17,794	20.23	-	32,927	37.43	-	1,981	2.25	-	535	0.61	-	-	-	-	1,797	2.04	87,961	NH
New Jersey	14	178,289	41.20	14	145,410	33.60	-	88,835	20.53	-	15,948	3.69	-	2,936	0.68	-	1,321	0.31	-	32,879	7.60	432,739	NJ
New Mexico	3	20,437	41.39	3	8,347	16.90	-	17,733	35.91	-	2,859	5.79	-	-	-	-	-	-	-	2,704	5.48	49,376	NM
New York	45	655,573	41.27	45	390,093	24.56	-	455,487	28.68	-	63,434	3.99	-	19,455	1.22	-	4,273	0.27	-	200,086	12.60	1,588,315	NY
North Carolina	12	144,407	59.24	12	69,135	28.36	-	29,129	11.95	-	987	0.40	-	118	0.05	-	-	-	-	75,272	30.88	243,776	NC
North Dakota	5	29,555	34.14	5	25,726	29.71	-	23,090	26.67	-	6,966	8.05	-	1,243	1.44	-	-	-	-	3,829	4.42	86,580	ND
Ohio	24	424,834	40.96	24	229,807	22.16	-	278,168	26.82	-	90,144	8.69	-	11,511	1.11	-	2,630	0.25	-	146,666	14.14	1,037,094	OH
Oklahoma	10	119,156	46.95	10	-	-	-	90,786	35.77	-	41,674	16.42	-	2,185	0.86	-	-	-	-	28,370	11.18	253,801	OK
Oregon	5	47,064	34.34	5	37,600	27.44	-	34,673	25.30	-	13,343	9.74	-	4,360	3.18	-	-	-	-	9,464	6.91	137,040	OR
Pennsylvania	38	395,637	32.49	-	444,894	36.53	38	273,360	22.45	-	83,614	6.87	-	19,525	1.60	-	706	0.06	-	-49,257	-4.04	1,217,736	PA
Rhode Island	5	30,412	39.04	5	16,878	21.67	-	27,703	35.56	-	2,049	2.63	-	616	0.79	-	236	0.30	-	2,709	3.48	77,894	RI
South Carolina	9	48,357	95.94	9	1,293	2.57	-	536	1.06	-	164	0.33	-	-	-	-	-	-	-	47,064	93.37	50,350	SC
South Dakota	5	48,942	42.07	-	58,811	50.56	5	-	-	-	4,662	4.01	-	3,910	3.36	-	-	-	-	-9,869	-8.48	116,325	SD
Tennessee	12	133,021	52.80	12	54,041	21.45	-	60,475	24.00	-	3,564	1.41	-	832	0.33	-	-	-	-	72,546	28.80	251,933	TN
Texas	20	221,589	72.73	20	28,853	8.86	-	26,755	9.45	-	25,743	8.25	-	1,738	0.57	-	442	0.14	-	192,736	63.17	305,120	TX
Utah	4	36,579	32.55	-	24,174	21.51	-	42,100	37.46	4	9,023	8.03	-	-	-	-	510	0.45	-	-5,521	-4.91	112,386	UT
Vermont	4	15,354	24.43	-	22,132	35.22	-	23,332	37.13	4	928	1.48	-	1,095	1.74	-	-	-	-	-1,200	-1.91	62,841	VT
Virginia	12	90,332	65.95	12	21,776	15.90	-	23,288	17.00	-	820	0.60	-	709	0.52	-	50	0.04	-	67,044	48.95	136,975	VA
Washington	7	86,840	26.90	-	113,698	35.22	7	70,445	21.82	-	40,134	12.43	-	9,810	3.04	-	1,872	0.58	-	-26,858	-8.32	322,799	WA
West Virginia	8	113,197	42.11	8	79,112	29.43	-	56,754	21.11	-	15,248	5.67	-	4,517	1.68	-	-	-	-	34,085	12.68	268,828	WV
Wisconsin	13	164,230	41.06	13	62,448	15.61	-	130,596	32.65	-	33,476	8.37	-	8,584	2.15	-	632	0.16	-	33,634	8.41	399,966	WI
Wyoming	3	15,310	36.20	3	9,232	21.83	-	14,560	34.42	-	2,760	6.53	-	434	1.03	-	-	-	-	750	1.77	42,296	WY
TOTALS:	531	6,296,284	41.84	435	4,122,721	27.40	88	3,486,242	23.17	8	901,551	5.99	-	208,156	1.38	-	29,324	0.19	-	2,173,563	14.44	15,044,278	US

=== States that flipped from Republican to Democratic ===
- Connecticut
- Delaware
- Idaho
- Illinois
- Indiana
- Iowa
- Kansas
- Maine
- Maryland (popular vote)
- Massachusetts
- Missouri
- Montana
- New Hampshire
- New Jersey
- New York
- North Dakota
- Ohio
- Oregon
- Rhode Island
- West Virginia
- Wisconsin
- Wyoming

=== States that flipped from Republican to Progressive ===
- California
- Michigan
- Minnesota
- Pennsylvania
- South Dakota
- Washington

=== Close states ===
Margin of victory less than 1% (13 electoral votes):

1. California, 0.03% (174 votes)

Margin of victory less than 5% (142 electoral votes):

1. Idaho, 1.05% (1,111 votes)
2. Illinois, 1.62% (18,570 votes)
3. Wyoming, 1.77% (750 votes)
4. Vermont, 1.91% (1,200 votes)
5. Maine, 2.02% (2,618 votes)
6. New Hampshire, 2.04% (1,797 votes)
7. Connecticut, 3.28% (6,237 votes)
8. Rhode Island, 3.48% (2,709 votes)
9. Massachusetts, 3.58% (17,460 votes)
10. Pennsylvania, 4.04% (49,257 votes)
11. North Dakota, 4.42% (3,829 votes)
12. Iowa, 4.77% (23,506 votes)
13. Utah, 4.91% (5,521 votes)

Margin of victory between 5% and 10% (73 electoral votes):

1. New Mexico, 5.48% (2,704 votes)
2. Minnesota, 5.81% (19,430 votes)
3. Kansas, 6.42% (23,453 votes)
4. Montana, 6.87% (5,485 votes)
5. Oregon, 6.91% (9,464 votes)
6. New Jersey, 7.60% (32,879 votes)
7. Washington, 8.32% (26,858 votes)
8. Wisconsin, 8.41% (33,634 votes)
9. South Dakota, 8.48% (9,869 votes)

Tipping point state:

1. New York, 12.6% (200,086 votes) (for a Wilson victory)
2. Ohio, 18.9% (146,666 votes) (for a Roosevelt victory)
3. New Hampshire, 37.2% (32,743 votes) (for a Taft victory)

=== County statistics ===
Counties with Highest Percent of Vote (Democratic)

1. Greenville County, South Carolina 100%
2. Marlboro County, South Carolina 100%
3. Hampton County, South Carolina 100%
4. Jasper County, South Carolina 100%
5. Reagan County, Texas 100%

Counties with Highest Percent of Vote (Progressive)

1. Scott County, Tennessee 75.15%
2. Campbell County, South Dakota 74.93%
3. Avery County, North Carolina 72.69%
4. Hutchinson County, South Dakota 67.84%
5. Hamlin County, South Dakota 66.79%

Counties with Highest Percent of Vote (Republican)

1. Zapata County, Texas 80.89%
2. Valencia County, New Mexico 77.25%
3. Kane County, Utah 75.40%
4. Clinton County, Kentucky 64.79%
5. Huerfano County, Colorado 63.36%

Counties with the Highest Percent of Vote (Socialist; incomplete)

1. Lake County, Minnesota 36.81%
2. Crawford County, Kansas 35.28%
3. Marshall County, Oklahoma 34.94%
4. McCurtain County, Oklahoma 31.83%
5. Okfuskee County, Oklahoma 30.90%

=== Maps ===
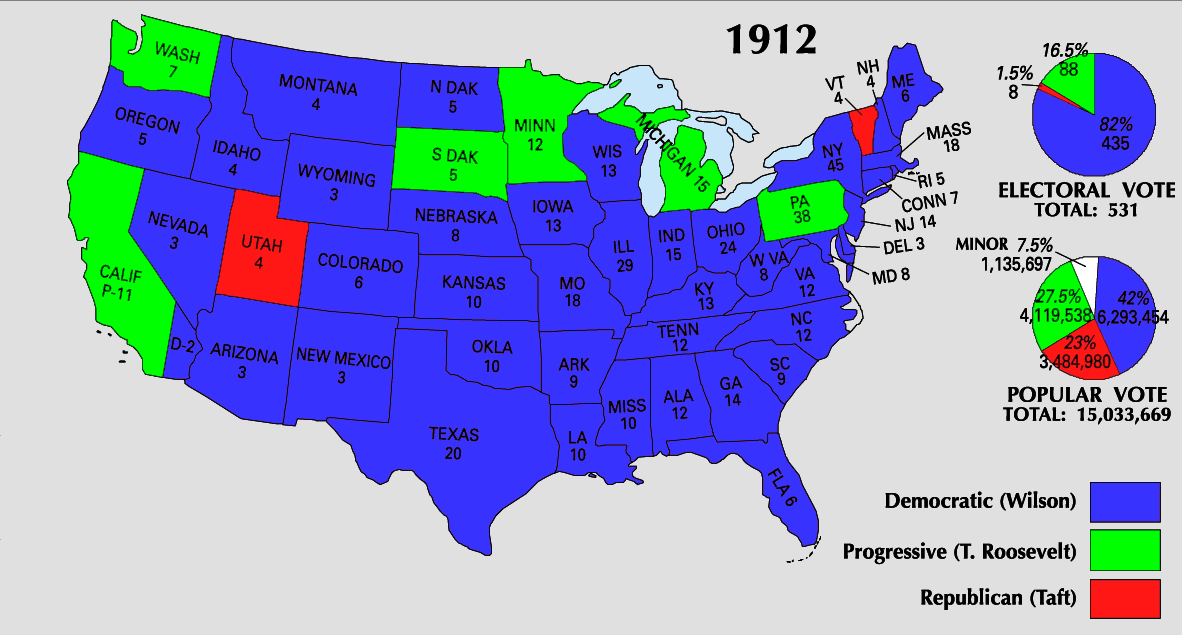
Results by state

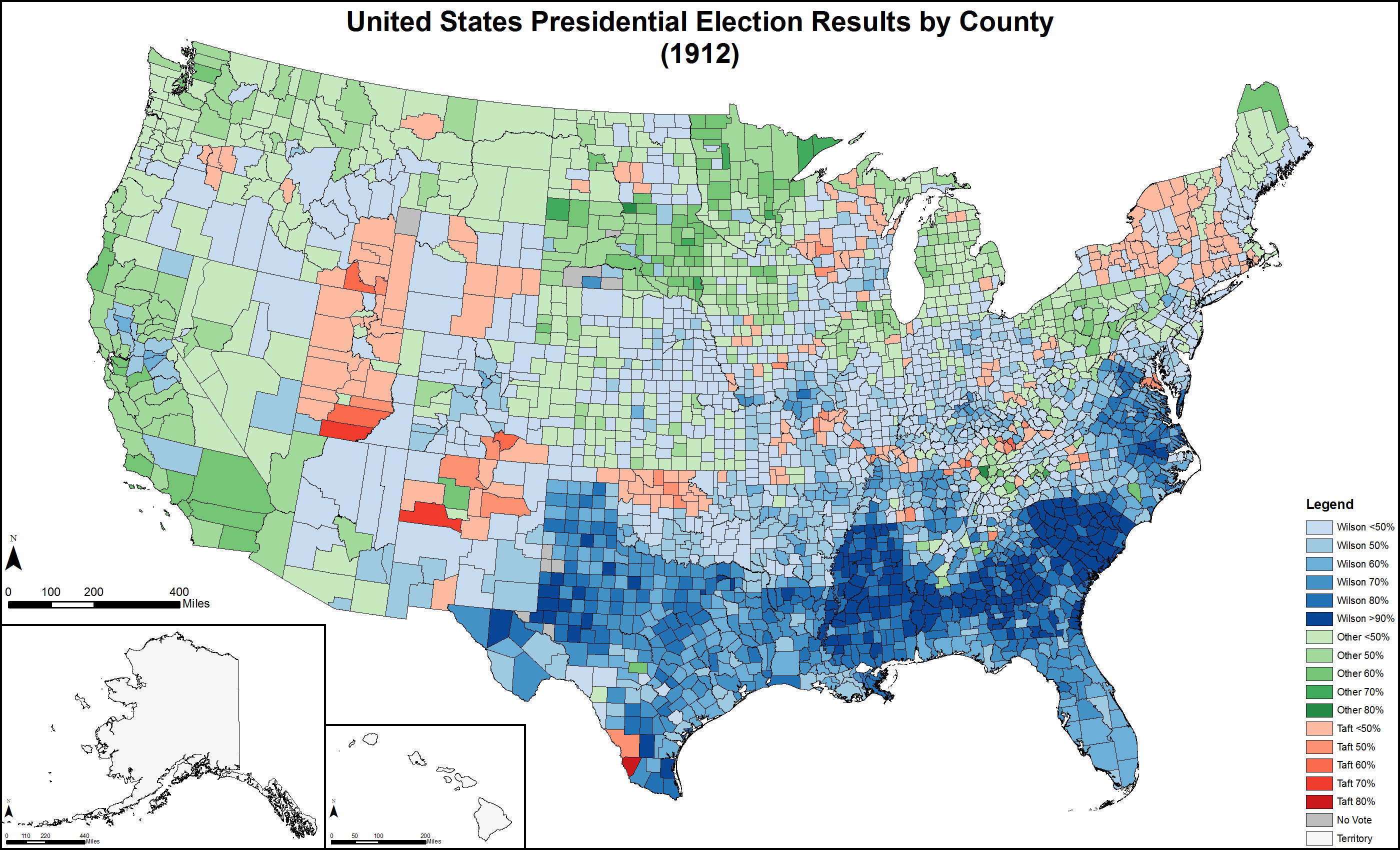
Map of presidential election results by county

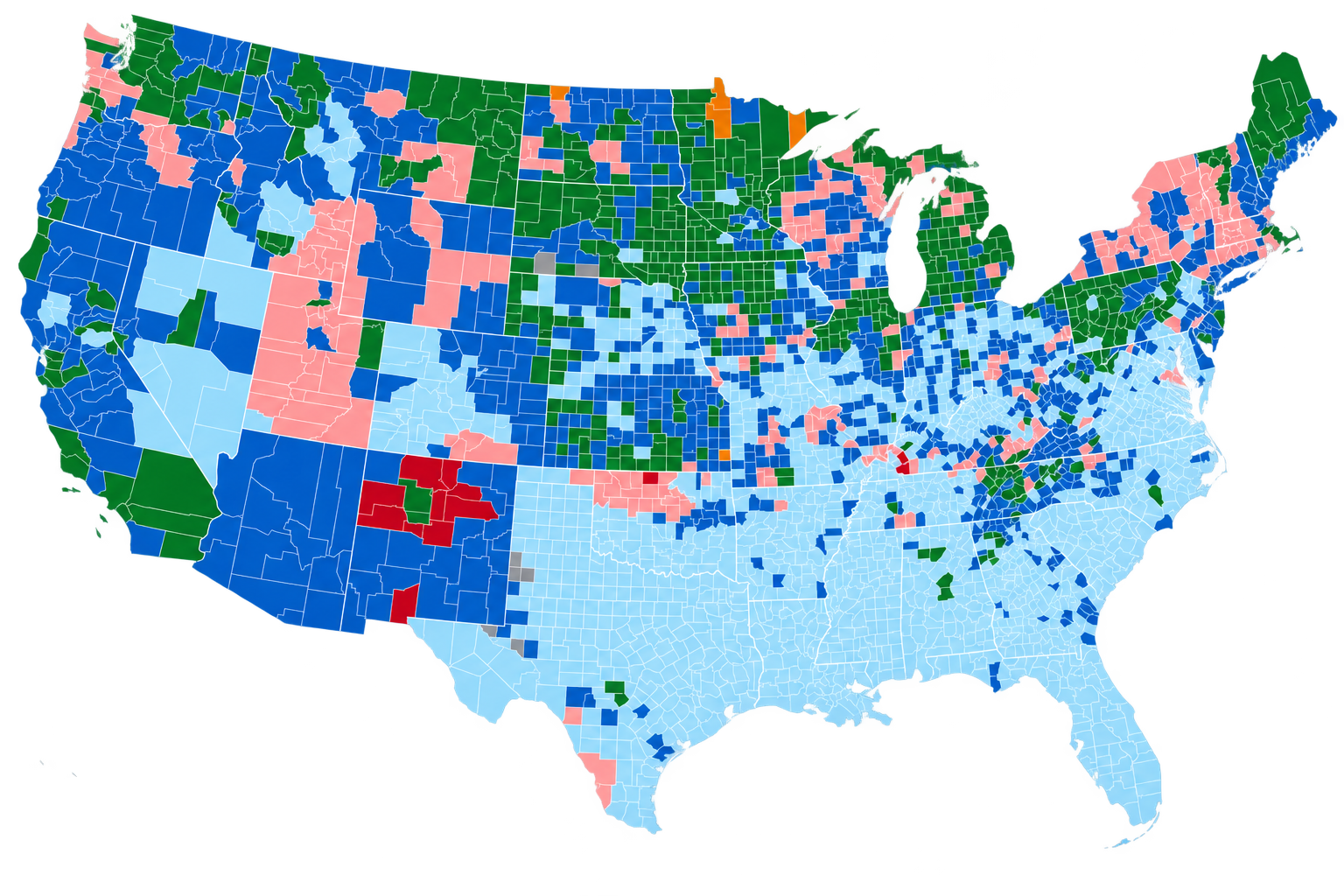
Map of county flips between 1908-1912, with dark colors denoting flips and light holds.

Results by county, shaded according to winning candidate's percentage of the vote

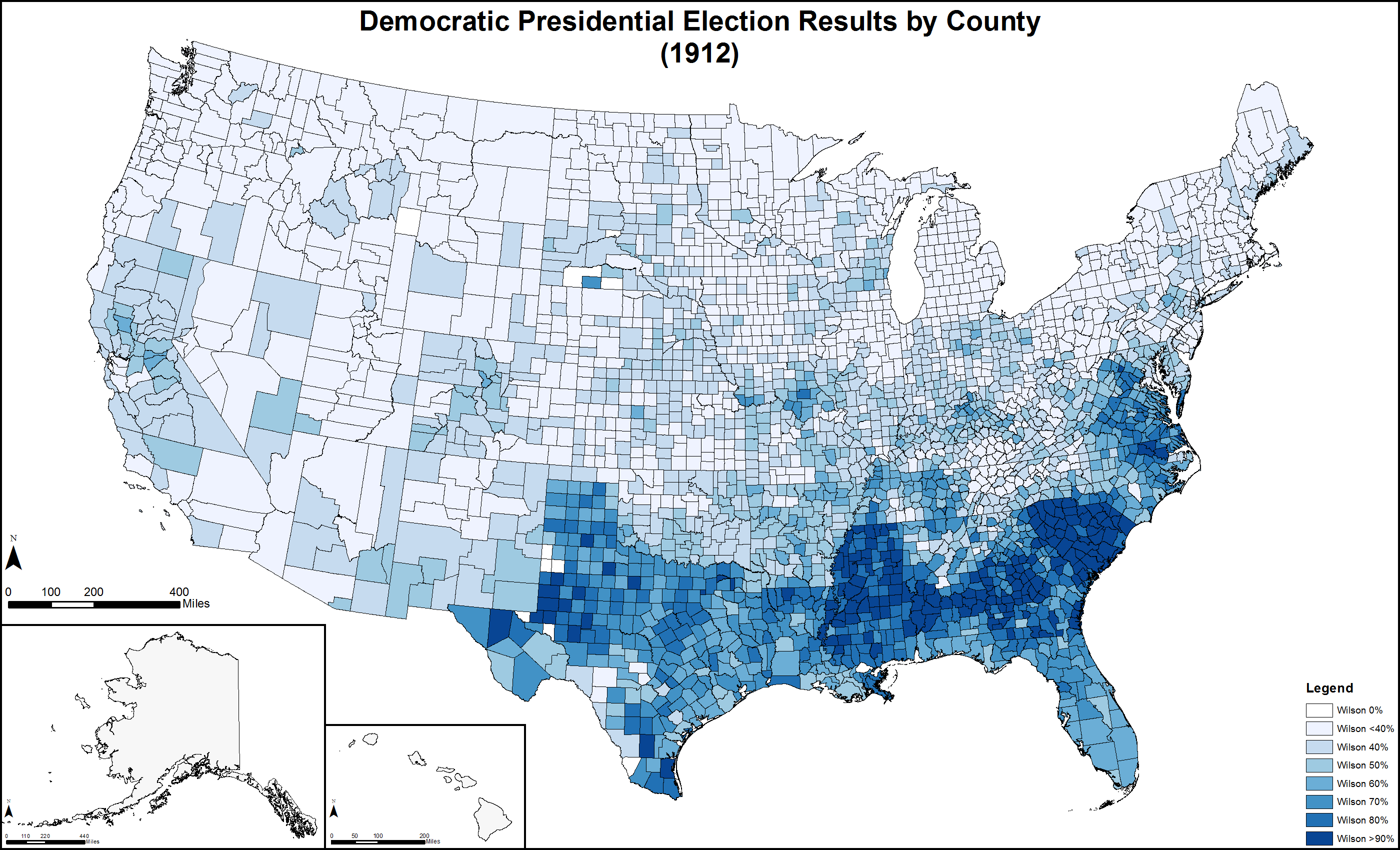
Results by county, shaded according to percentage of the vote for Wilson

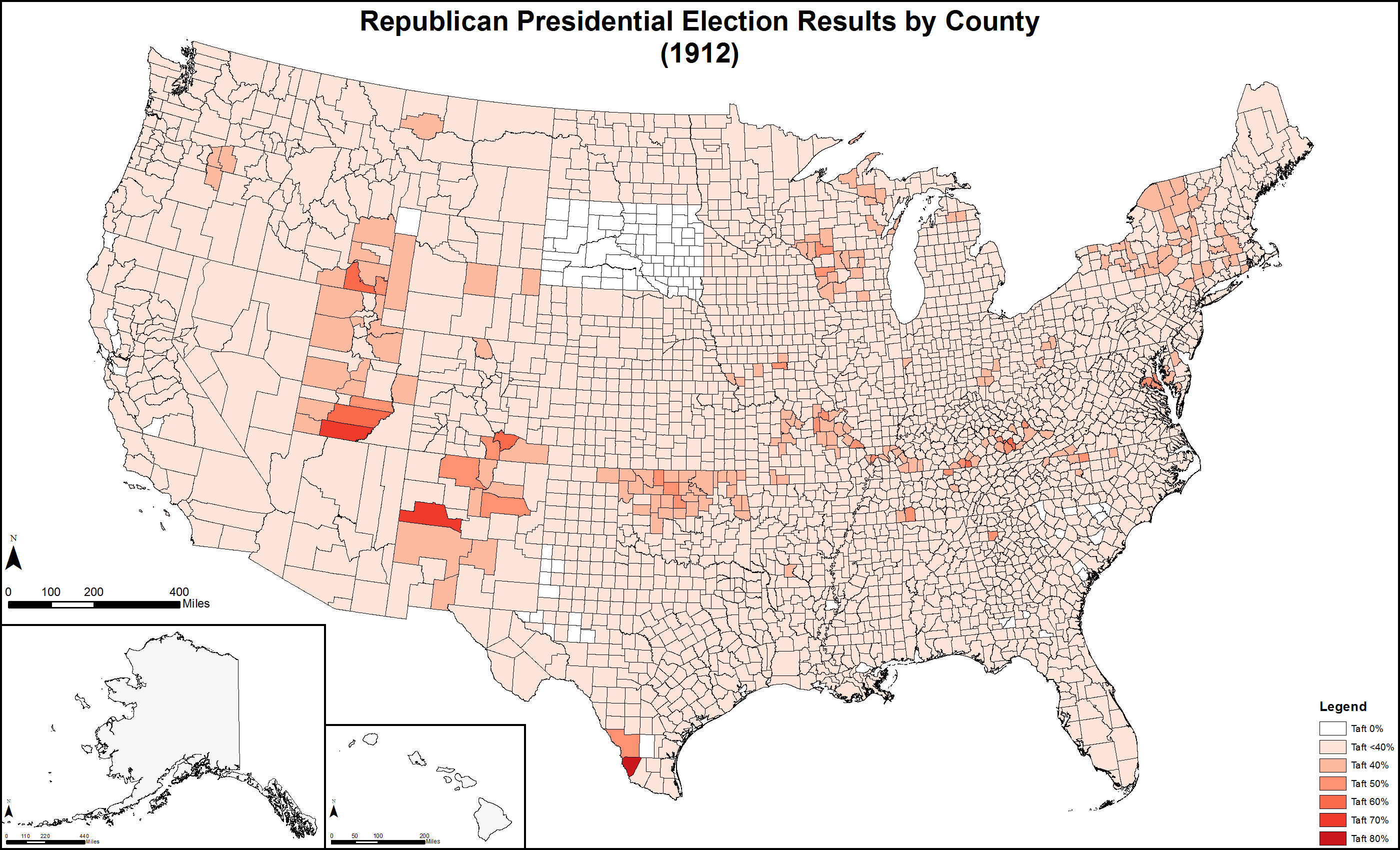
Results by county, shaded according to percentage of the vote for Taft

Results by county, shaded according to percentage of the vote for Debs

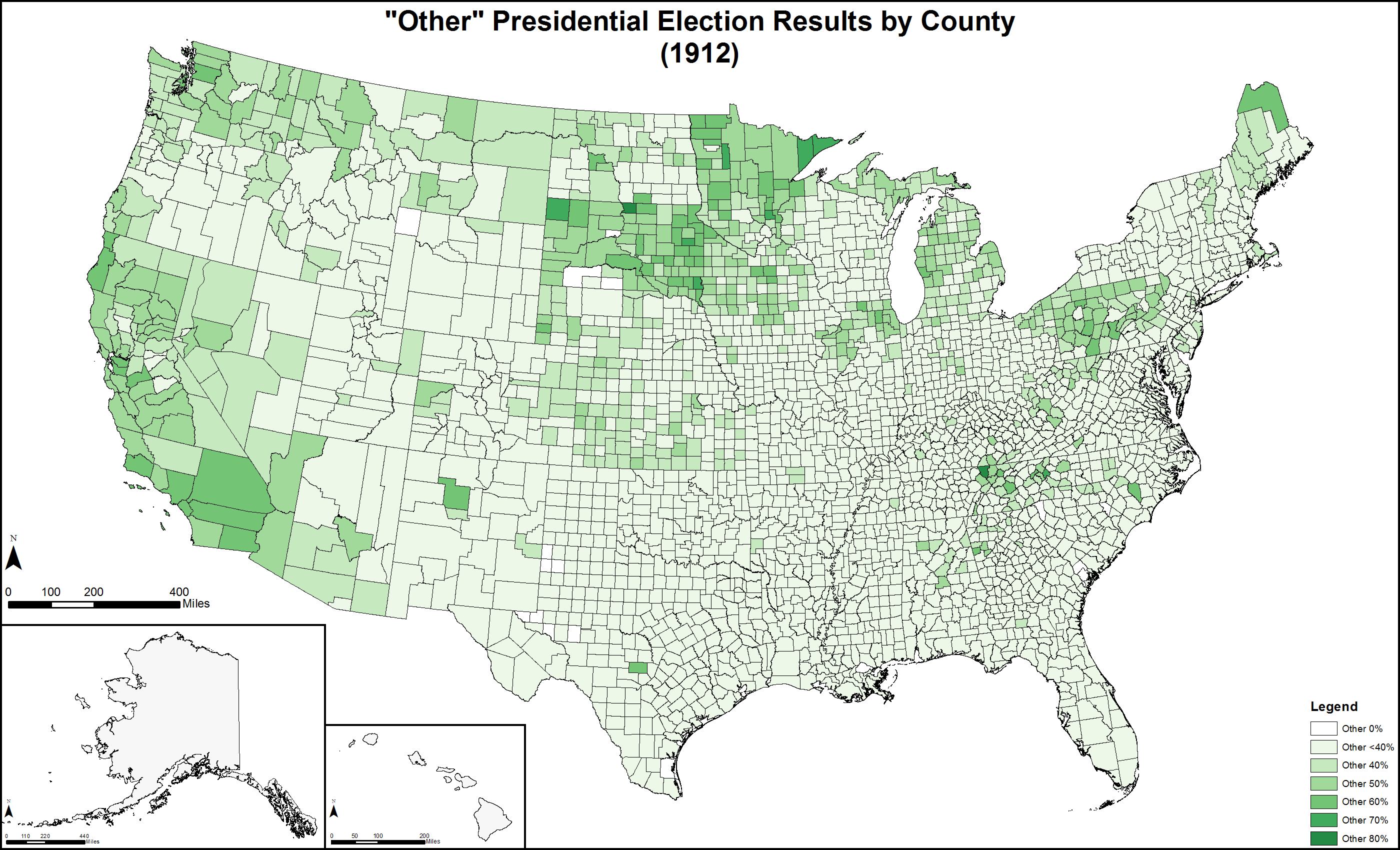
Results by county, shaded according to percentage of the vote for all others including Debs

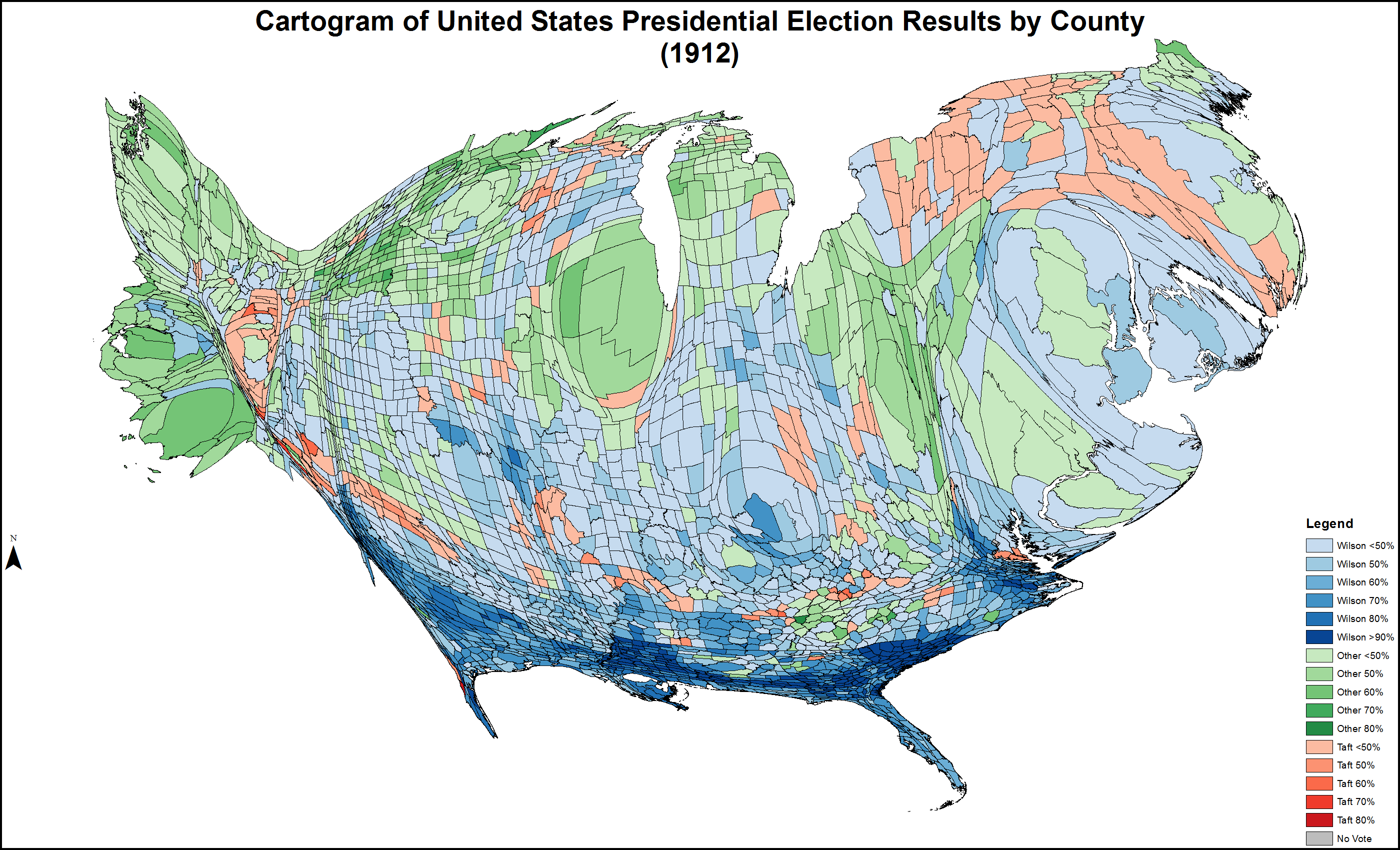
A continuous cartogram of the 1912 United States presidential election

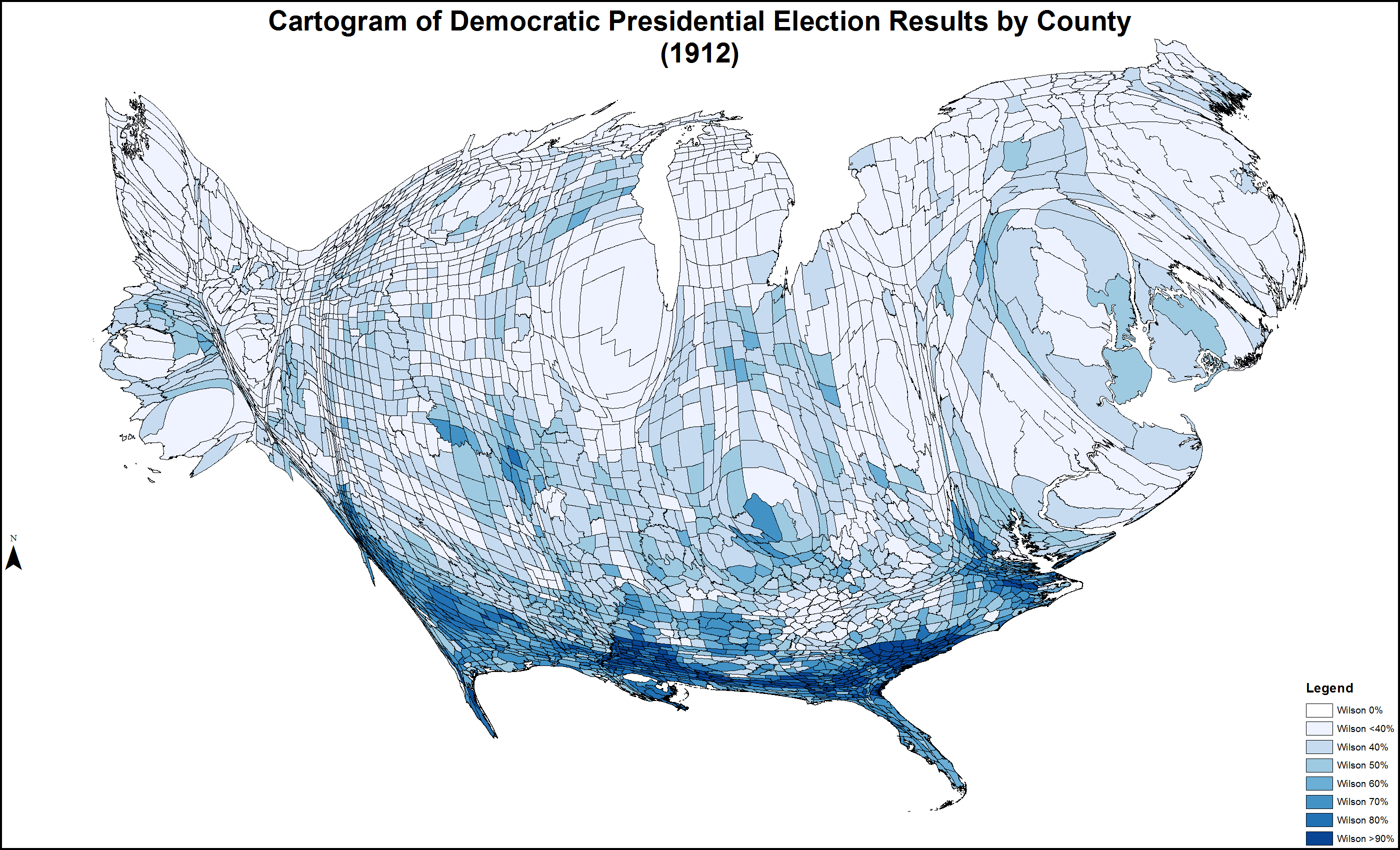
Cartogram shaded according to percentage of the vote for Wilson

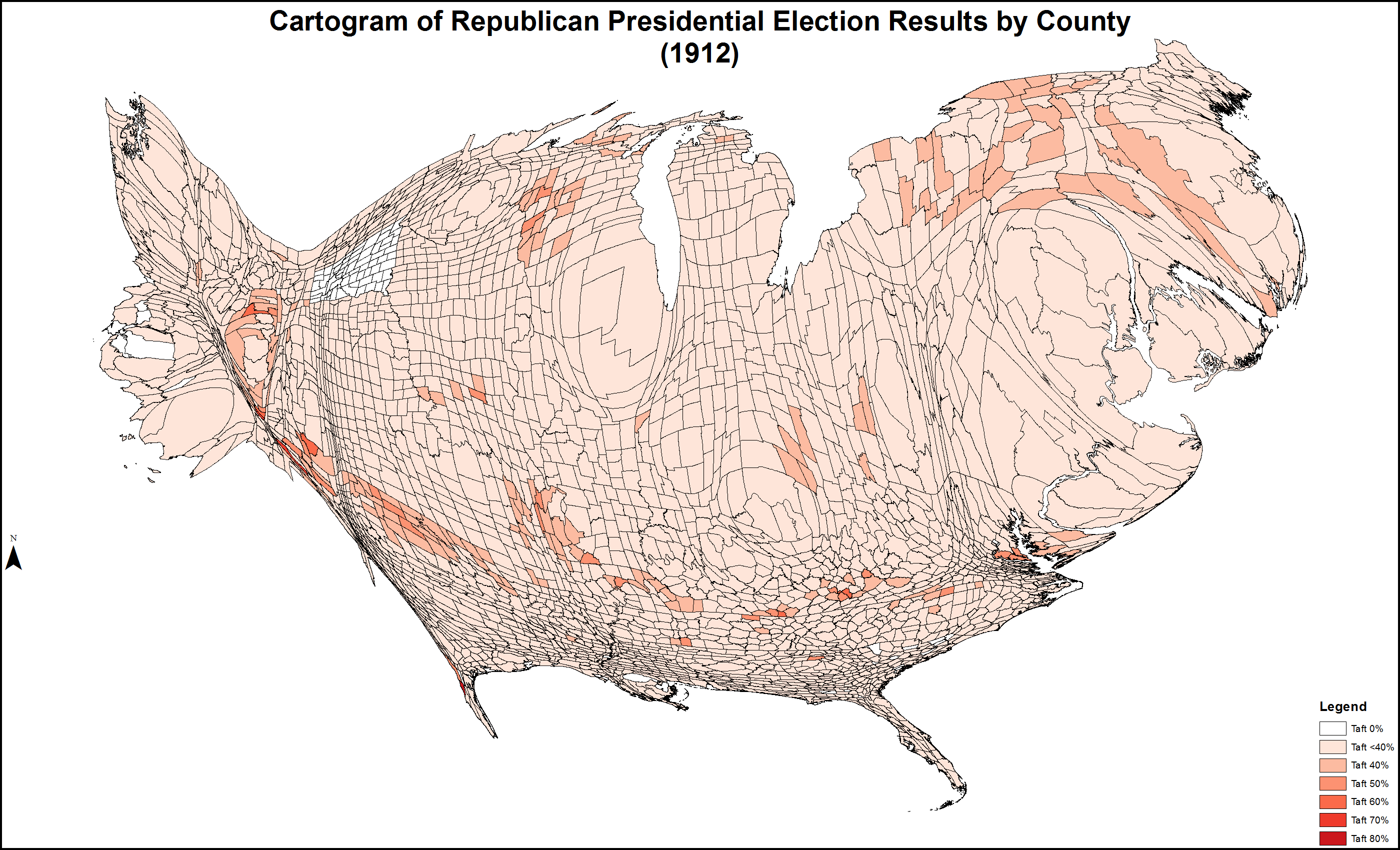
Cartogram shaded according to percentage of the vote for Taft

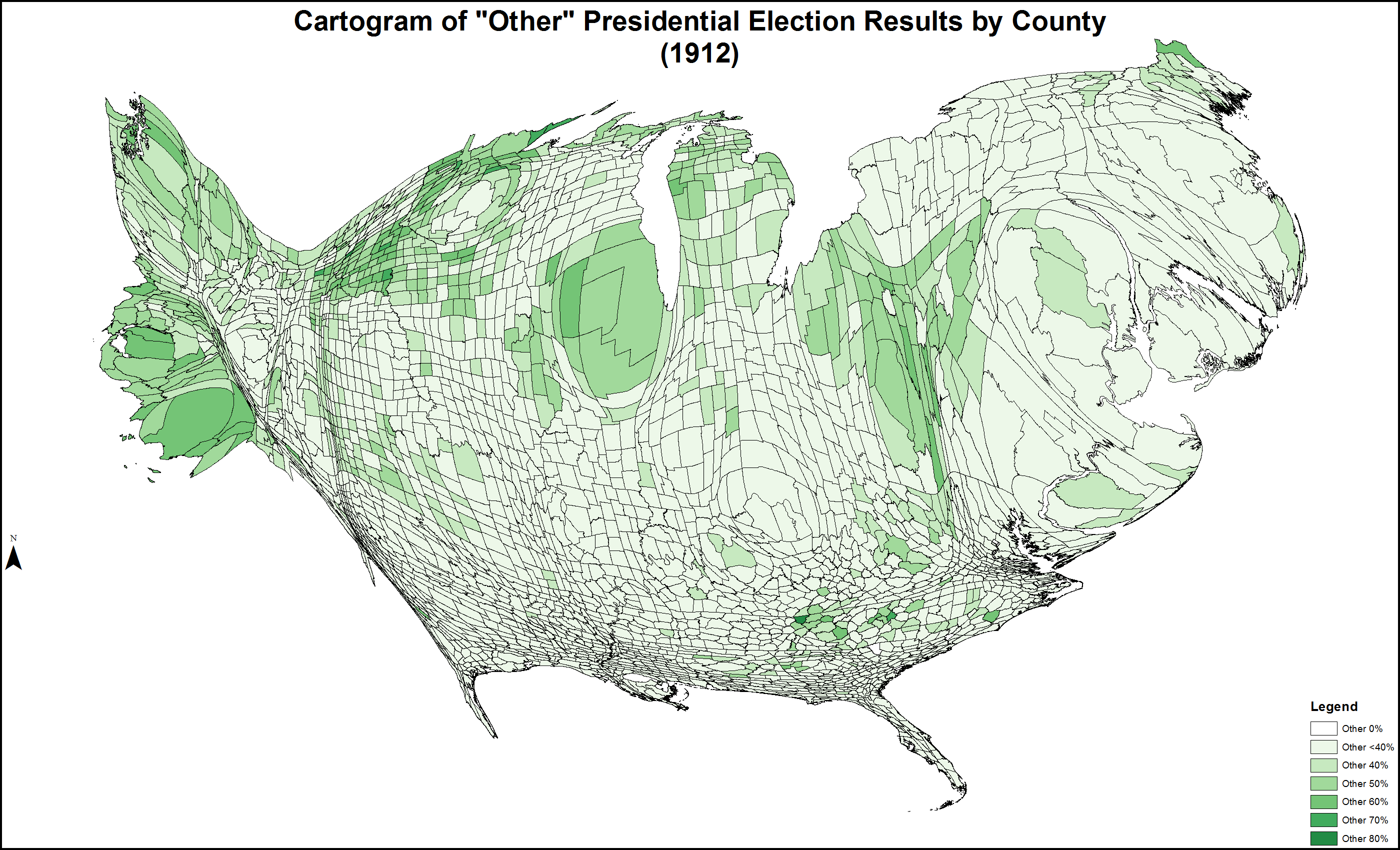
Cartogram shaded according to percentage of the vote for all others

Results by state, shaded according to percentage of the vote according to winning candidate's percentage of the vote

State Level Performance for Eugene Debs' Presidential Campaign, 1912 (Socialist Party)

== Results in major cities ==
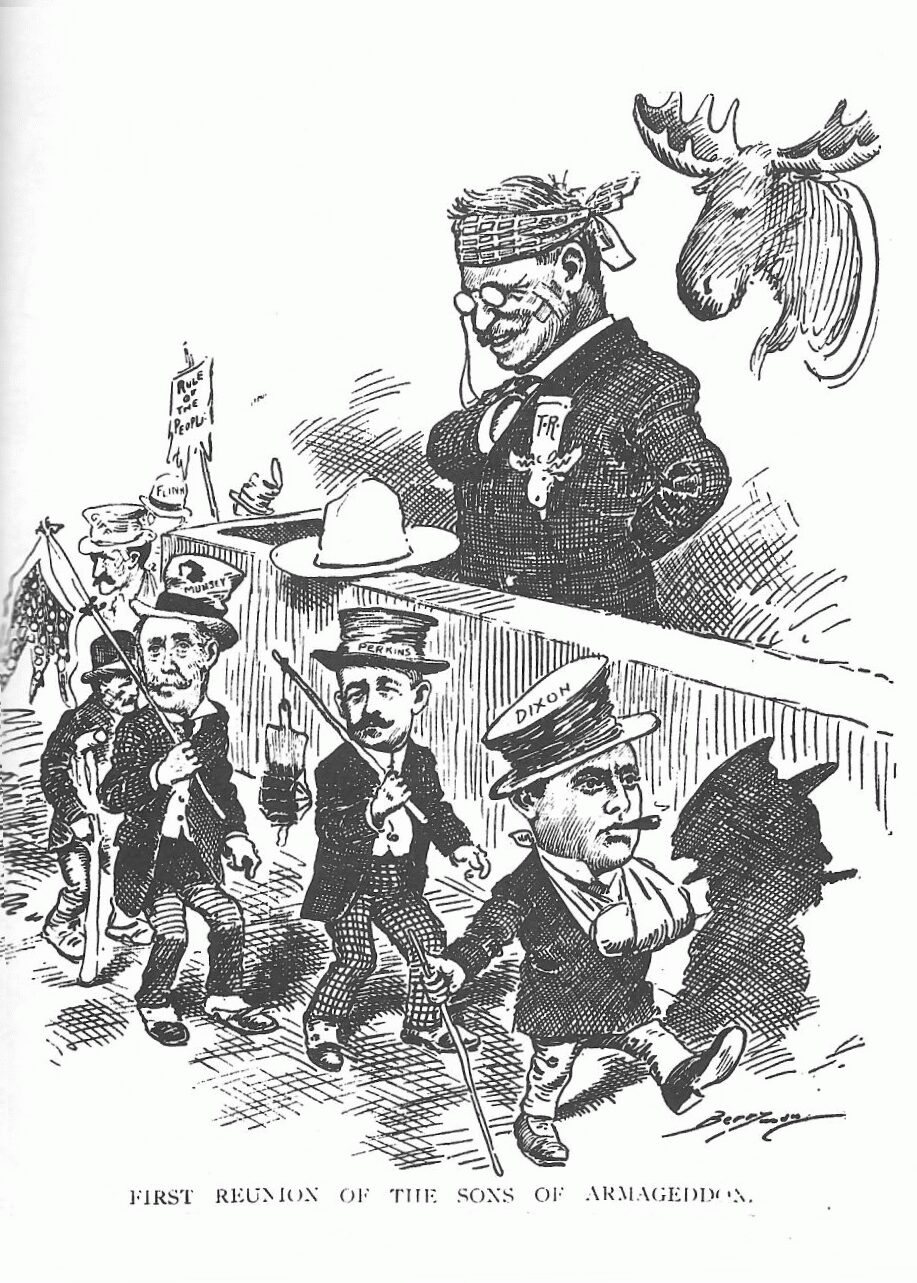
Roosevelt, hurting from his defeats, reviews his wounded lieutenants Munsey, Perkins and Dixon. From The Evening Star (Washington DC) Dec 10, 1912

Results of various cities within the top 100 municipalities by the 1910 United States census.

City	ST	Wilson	Taft	Roosevelt	Debs	Others	Totals
San Francisco	CA	48,953	65	38,610	12,354	1,166	101,148
Oakland	CA	11,210	0	14,221	1,549	525	27,505
Denver	CO	26,690	8,155	25,154	2,750	764	63,513
Bridgeport	CT	5,870	4,625	3,654	1,511	284	15,944
Hartford	CT	7,481	6,396	2,467	849	258	17,451
New Haven	CT	8,946	7,291	3,252	1,696	442	21,627
Waterbury	CT	4,440	3,261	1,675	787	212	10,375
Des Moines	IA	6,005	3,669	6,432			
Chicago	IL	124,297	71,030	150,290	53,743	2,806	402,166
Ft. Wayne	IN	4,892	1,896	2,793			
Indianapolis	IN	18,306	8,722	9,693			
New Orleans	LA	26,433	904	5,692			
Boston	MA	43,065	21,427	21,533	1,818	428	88,271
Cambridge	MA	6,667	3,362	3,403	192	68	13,692
Fall River	MA	5,160	4,224	3,453	219	256	13,312
Lowell	MA	5,459	3,034	3,783	170	82	12,528
Lynn	MA	4,595	4,144	4,764	583	178	14,264
Lawrence	MA	3,765	1,952	2,550	518	88	8,873
Holyoke	MA	2,997	1,680	1,873	249	57	6,856
Brockton	MA	2,740	1,548	4,332	756	47	9,423
New Bedford	MA	3,290	4,177	1,905	626	98	10,096
Somerville	MA	4,062	3,757	4,072	176	78	12,145
Springfield	MA	4,375	5,167	3,161	555	58	13,316
Worcester	MA	6,049	10,532	4,818	230	140	21,769
Baltimore	MD	48,030	15,597	33,679	1,763	253	99,322
Portland	ME	4,242	2,776	3,305	197	58	10,578
Kansas City	MO	26,954	4,646	20,894	1,470	465	54,429
St. Louis	MO	58,845	46,509	24,746	9,159	1,068	140,327
Manchester	NH	4,502	4,022	2,165	520	35	11,244
Bayonne	NJ	3,717	1,184	2,552			
Camden	NJ	6,895	5,517	4,707			
Elizabeth	NJ	5,139	1,900	3,953			
Jersey City	NJ	21,069	4,070	11,986			
Newark	NJ	14,031	10,780	19,721			
Hoboken	NJ	5,083	975	2,341			
Paterson	NJ	7,437	3,007	7,223			
Trenton	NJ	5,146	3,898	4,753			
Passaic	NJ	1,715	999	1,952			
Buffalo	NY	26,192	14,433	20,769			
New York City	NY	312,426	126,582	188,896	33,239	2,730	663,873
Rochester	NY	13,430	12,230	11,102	2,593	636	39,991
Yonkers	NY	5,533	4,056	4,536	354	49	14,528
Cincinnati	OH	31,221	30,588	9,970	6,520	401	78,700
Allentown	PA	4,627	1,224	3,475	686	59	10,071
Erie	PA	3,407	2,378	1,898	1,464	140	9,287
Philadelphia	PA	66,308	91,944	82,963	9,784	691	251,690
Pittsburgh	PA	17,352	14,658	25,394	8,498	534	66,436
Reading	PA	6,130	1,657	6,719	2,800	83	17,389
Scranton	PA	6,193	1,817	7,971	564	214	16,759
Wilkes-Barre	PA	2,905	1,178	3,951	219	47	8,300
Erie	PA	3,407	2,378	1,898	1,464	140	9,287
Johnstown	PA	2,609	959	3,310	189	99	7,166
Harrisburgh	PA	3,971	3,205	4,718	451	120	12,465
Salt Lake City	UT	7,488	8,964	6,587	2,498		
Norfolk	VA	3,539	195	451	33	10	4,228
Richmond	VA	5,636	405	483	91	12	6,627
Milwaukee	WI	24,501	15,092	5,127	17,708	511	62,939

== See also ==
- 1912 United States House of Representatives elections
- 1912–13 United States Senate elections
- History of the United States (1865–1918)
- Progressive Era
- Bull Moose Party
- 1912 Populist National Convention

== Works cited ==
- Abramson, Paul; Aldrich, John; Rohde, David (1995). Change and Continuity in the 1992 Elections. CQ Press. ISBN 0871878399.
- Sherman, Richard (1973). The Republican Party and Black America From McKinley to Hoover 1896-1933. University of Virginia Press. ISBN 0813904676.
