= 1912 Populist National Convention =

- 1912 presidential election

Convention
- Date(s): August 1912
- City: St. Louis, Missouri

Voting
- Total delegates: 8 (attending)

The 1912 Populist National Convention was held in St. Louis, Missouri, in August 1912. The national convention of the remaining rump party saw attendance by merely eight delegates.

== Background ==
In some states which had state-run delegate-selecting presidential primaries, such as Nebraska, delegates were elected through such primaries for a potential Populist convention. In Nebraska's primaries, held in May, William Jennings Bryan was elected as a delegate to both the Democratic and the Populist conventions. It was speculated at that time that Bryan might seek nomination for president at the Democratic convention, and if successful would then attend the Populist convention in order to secure its nomination too. The party had once before co-nominated Bryan in electoral fusion its the Democratic in 1896.

== Proceedings ==
Described in one news report as a "funeral" for the once-significant party, the national convention of the remaining rump party saw attendance by merely eight delegates. It was reported to have been held in a mere parlor, rather than a large meeting space.

The convention unanimously re-affirmed the Omaha Platform first adopted by the party at is its 1892 national convention. The party did not nominate a presidential ticket, but also refrained from endorsing the ticket of any other parties. This was despite advance expectations by The Associated Press that the party would endorse the Bull Moose Party ticket.
