= James E. Campbell (academic) =

American political scientist

James E. Campbell is an American political scientist, currently UB Distinguished Professor Emeritus at University at Buffalo, State University of New York. Professor Campbell retired at the conclusion of the Spring 2022 semester.

Campbell was the Department Chair of Political Science at the University at Buffalo from 2006 to 2012 and worked on the faculty of the University of Georgia from 1980 to 1988. He also worked on the faculty of Louisiana State University from 1988 to 1998 before moving to the University at Buffalo in 1998.
