= Joe Jackson =

Joe or Joseph Jackson may refer to:

== Entertainment ==
- Joe Jackson Sr. (1873–1942), Austrian clown
- Joseph Jackson (screenwriter) (1894–1932), American screenwriter of The Barker
- Joe Jackson (talent manager) (1928–2018), father and manager of Michael Jackson and the Jacksons
- Joe Jackson (musician) (born 1954), British singer-songwriter
- "Little Joe" Jackson, fictional character in the Broadway show and film Cabin in the Sky

== Politics ==
- Joseph Jackson (Bristol MP), 17th century English politician
- Joseph Devonsher Jackson (1783–1857), Irish Conservative MP in the UK Parliament
- Joseph Jackson (Michigan politician) (1793–1888), American politician in the Michigan House of Representatives
- Joseph Webber Jackson (1796–1854), US Representative from Georgia
- Joseph Jackson (Canadian politician) (1831–1908), Canadian Member of Parliament for Norfolk South, 1882–1887
- Joseph Jackson (Australian politician) (1874–1956), Member of New South Wales Legislative Assembly for Sydney, 1922–1927
- Joseph Cooksey Jackson (1879–1938), British Member of Parliament for Heywood and Radcliffe, 1931–1935
- Joseph H. Jackson (New York politician), American lawyer and politician from New York

== Sports ==
=== American football ===
- Joey Jackson (born 1950)
- Joe Jackson (linebacker, born 1953)
- Joe Jackson (linebacker, born 1962)
- Joe Jackson (linebacker, born 1976)
- Joe Jackson (offensive lineman) (born 1979)
- Joe Jackson (defensive end) (born 1996)
- Joe Jackson (running back) (born 2004)

=== Other sports ===
- Shoeless Joe Jackson (1887–1951), American baseball player in Black Sox Scandal
- Joe S. Jackson (1871–1936), American sportswriter
- Joseph Jackson (sport shooter) (1880–1960), American Olympic champion sport shooter
- Joseph Jackson (athlete) (1904–1981), French Olympic sprinter
- Neil Jackson (swimmer) (Joseph Neil Jackson, born 1946), British Olympic swimmer
- Joe Jackson (basketball) (born 1992), American basketball player
- Joe Jackson (footballer) (born 1993), English footballer

== Other people ==
- Joey Jackson (attorney) (born 1966), American criminal defense attorney
- Joseph Jackson (explorer) (1832–1868), Australian explorer and pastoralist
- Joseph Jackson (typefounder) (1733–1792), British typefounder
- Joseph A. Jackson (1861–1940), American architect
- Joseph Raymond Jackson (1880–1969), judge of the U.S. Court of Customs and Patent Appeals
- Joseph H. Jackson (1900–1990), American Baptist pastor and civil rights campaigner
- Joe Jackson (police officer) (1902–1975), Assistant Commissioner of the London Metropolitan Police, 1953–1963
- Joe M. Jackson (1923–2019), US Air Force officer and Medal of Honor recipient in the Vietnam War
- Joe Jackson (writer) (born 1955), American author
- Joseph H. Jackson (Nauvoo Legion), resident of Nauvoo, Illinois who played role in Mormon founder Joseph Smith's arrest

== See also ==
- Jo Jackson (disambiguation)
