= Millard Fillmore =

President of the United States from 1850 to 1853

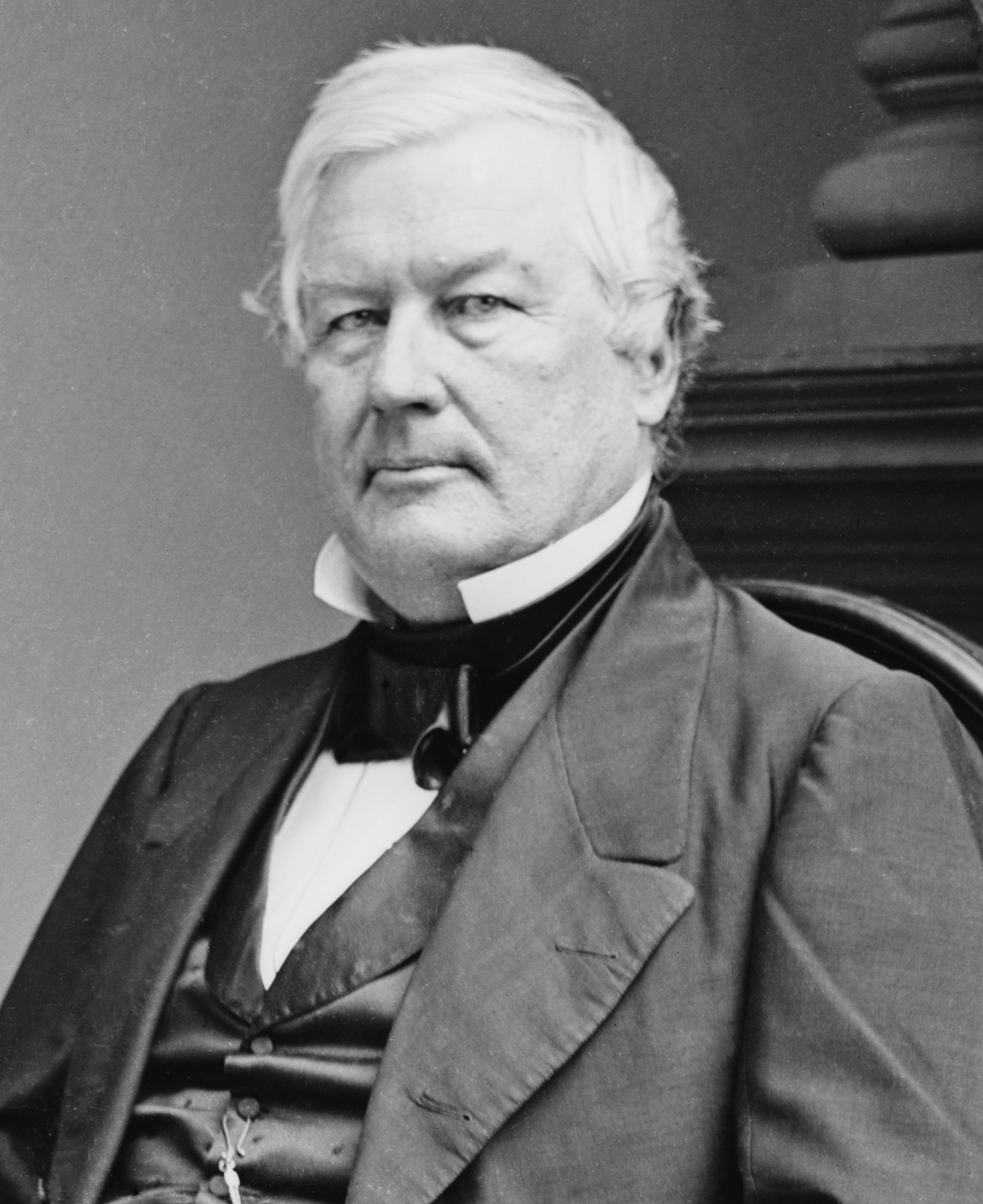
- Photograph, c. 1855–1865

13th President of the United States
- In office July 9, 1850 – March 4, 1853
- Vice President: Vacant (Note: Fillmore was Vice President under President Zachary Taylor and became President upon Taylor's death on July 9, 1850. Prior to adoption of the Twenty-fifth Amendment (1967) a vacancy in the office of vice president was not filled until the next ensuing election and inauguration.)
- Preceded by: Zachary Taylor
- Succeeded by: Franklin Pierce

12th Vice President of the United States
- In office March 4, 1849 – July 9, 1850
- President: Zachary Taylor
- Preceded by: George M. Dallas
- Succeeded by: William R. King

14th Comptroller of New York
- In office January 1, 1848 – February 20, 1849
- Governor: John Young; Hamilton Fish
- Preceded by: Azariah C. Flagg
- Succeeded by: Washington Hunt

Chairman of the House Ways and Means Committee
- In office March 4, 1841 – March 3, 1843
- Preceded by: John Winston Jones
- Succeeded by: James I. McKay

Member of the U.S. House of Representatives from New York's 32nd district
- In office March 4, 1837 – March 3, 1843
- Preceded by: Thomas C. Love
- Succeeded by: William A. Moseley
- In office March 4, 1833 – March 3, 1835
- Preceded by: Constituency established
- Succeeded by: Thomas C. Love

Personal details
- Born: January 7, 1800 Moravia, New York, U.S.
- Died: March 8, 1874 (aged 74) Buffalo, New York, U.S.
- Resting place: Forest Lawn Cemetery
- Party: Whig (1832–1855)
- Other political affiliations: Anti-Masonic (1828–1832); American (1855–1856)
- Spouses: Abigail Powers (m. 1826; died 1853) Caroline McIntosh (m. 1858)
- Children: Millard; Mary
- Parents: Nathaniel Fillmore; Phoebe Millard
- Occupation: Politician; lawyer

Military service
- Branch/service: New York Militia; New York Guard
- Years of service: 1820s–1830s (Militia); 1860s–1870s (Guard)
- Rank: Major (Militia); Captain (Guard)
- Commands: Union Continentals (Guard)
- Battles/wars: American Civil War

Millard Fillmore (January 7, 1800 – March 8, 1874) was the 13th president of the United States, serving from 1850 to 1853. He was the last president to be a member of the Whig Party while in the White House, (Note: Abraham Lincoln was a Whig before he became president.) and the last to be neither a Democrat nor a Republican. A former member of the U.S. House of Representatives, Fillmore was elected vice president in 1848, and succeeded to the presidency when Zachary Taylor died in 1850. Fillmore was instrumental in passing the Compromise of 1850, which led to a brief truce in the battle over the expansion of slavery.

Fillmore was born into poverty in the Finger Lakes area of upstate New York. He had little formal schooling, but studied to become a lawyer. Fillmore became prominent in the Buffalo area as an attorney and politician, and was elected to the New York Assembly in 1828 and the House of Representatives in 1832. Fillmore initially belonged to the Anti-Masonic Party, but became a member of the Whig Party as it formed in the mid-1830s. He was a rival for the state party leadership with Thurlow Weed and his protégé William H. Seward. Throughout his career, Fillmore declared slavery evil but said it was beyond the federal government's power to end it. Conversely, Seward argued that the federal government had a role to play. Fillmore was an unsuccessful candidate for Speaker of the U.S. House of Representatives when the Whigs took control of the chamber in 1841, but was made chairman of the Ways and Means Committee. Defeated in bids for the Whig nomination for vice president and for New York governor in 1844, Fillmore was elected Comptroller of New York in 1847, the first to hold that post by election.

As vice president, Fillmore was largely ignored by Taylor; even in dispensing patronage in New York, Taylor consulted Weed and Seward. In his capacity as president of the Senate, Fillmore presided over its angry debates as the 31st Congress decided whether to allow slavery in the Mexican Cession. Unlike Taylor, Fillmore supported Henry Clay's omnibus bill, the basis of the 1850 Compromise. Upon becoming president in July 1850, he dismissed Taylor's cabinet and pushed Congress to pass the compromise. The Fugitive Slave Act of 1850, expediting the return of escaped slaves to those who claimed ownership, was a controversial part of the compromise. Fillmore felt duty-bound to enforce it, though it damaged his popularity and also the Whig Party, which was torn between its Northern and Southern factions. In foreign policy, he supported U.S. Navy expeditions to open trade in Japan, opposed French designs on Hawaii, and was embarrassed by Narciso López's filibuster expeditions to Cuba. Fillmore failed to win the Whig nomination for president in 1852.

As the Whig Party broke up after his presidency, Fillmore and many in its conservative wing joined the Know Nothings and formed the American Party. Despite his party's emphasis on anti-immigration and anti-Catholic policies, during the 1856 presidential election he said little about immigration, focusing on the preservation of the Union, and lost to Democrat James Buchanan. During the American Civil War, Fillmore denounced secession and agreed that the Union must be maintained by force if necessary, but was critical of Abraham Lincoln's war policies. After peace was restored, he supported President Andrew Johnson's Reconstruction policies. Fillmore remained involved in civic interests after his presidency, including as chancellor of the University of Buffalo, which he had helped found in 1846. Historians usually rank Fillmore among the worst presidents in American history, largely for his policies regarding slavery, as well as among the least memorable.

== Early life and career ==
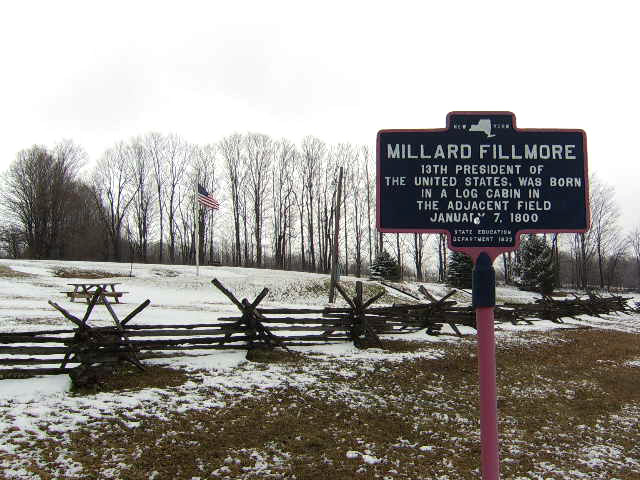
Historical marker at the site of Fillmore's birth in Cayuga County, New York

Millard Fillmore was born on January 7, 1800, in a log cabin, on a farm in what is now Moravia, in the Finger Lakes region of New York. His parents were Phoebe Millard and Nathaniel Fillmore; he was the second of eight children and the oldest son. The Fillmores were of English descent; John Fillmore arrived in Ipswich, Massachusetts, during the colonial era.

Nathaniel Fillmore was the son of Nathaniel Fillmore Sr., a native of Franklin, Connecticut, who became one of the earliest settlers of Bennington, Vermont. Nathaniel Fillmore and Phoebe Millard moved from Vermont in 1799 and sought better opportunities than were available on Nathaniel's stony farm, but the title to their Cayuga County land proved defective, and the Fillmore family moved to nearby Sempronius, where they leased land as tenant farmers, and Nathaniel occasionally taught school. The historian Tyler Anbinder described Fillmore's childhood as "one of hard work, frequent privation, and virtually no formal schooling."

Over time Nathaniel became more successful in Sempronius, but during Millard's formative years, the family endured severe poverty. (Note: Nathaniel Fillmore, the first father of a President to visit his son at the White House, told a questioner how to raise a son to be president: "Cradle him in a sap trough.") Nathaniel became sufficiently regarded that he was chosen to serve in local offices, including justice of the peace. Hoping that his oldest son would learn a trade, he convinced Millard, who was 14, not to enlist for the War of 1812 and apprenticed him to clothmaker Benjamin Hungerford in Sparta. Fillmore was relegated to menial labor, and unhappy at not learning any skills, he left Hungerford's employ.

His father placed him in the same trade at a mill in New Hope. Seeking to better himself, Millard bought a share in a circulating library and read all the books that he could. In 1819 he took advantage of idle time at the mill to enroll at a new academy in the town, where he met and fell in love with a classmate, Abigail Powers.

Later in 1819 Nathaniel moved the family to Montville, a hamlet of Moravia. Appreciating his son's talents, Nathaniel followed his wife's advice and persuaded Judge Walter Wood, the Fillmores' landlord and the wealthiest person in the area, to allow Millard to be his law clerk for a trial period. Wood agreed to employ young Fillmore and to supervise him as he read law. Fillmore earned money teaching school for three months and bought out his mill apprenticeship. He left Wood after eighteen months; the judge had paid him almost nothing, and they quarreled after Fillmore had, unaided, earned a small sum by advising a farmer in a minor lawsuit. Refusing to pledge not to do so again, Fillmore gave up his clerkship. Nathaniel again moved the family, and Millard accompanied it west to East Aurora, near Buffalo, where Nathaniel purchased a farm that became prosperous.

On January 7, 1821, Fillmore turned 21, reaching adulthood. He taught school in East Aurora, New York, and accepted a few cases in justice of the peace courts, which did not require the practitioner to be a licensed attorney. He moved to Buffalo the following year and continued his study of law, first while he taught school and then in the law office of Asa Rice and Joseph Clary. Meanwhile, he became engaged to Abigail Powers. In 1823 he was admitted to the bar, declined offers from Buffalo law firms, and returned to East Aurora to establish a practice as the town's only resident lawyer. Later in life, Fillmore said he had initially lacked the self-confidence to practice in the larger city of Buffalo. His biographer, Paul Finkelman, suggested that after being under others' thumbs all his life, Fillmore enjoyed the independence of his East Aurora practice. Millard and Abigail wed on February 5, 1826. He was 26 years old, and she was 27. They had two children, Millard Powers Fillmore and Mary Abigail Fillmore.

== Buffalo politician ==
Other members of the Fillmore family were active in politics and government in addition to Nathaniel's service as a justice of the peace. (Note: Fillmore's uncle Calvin Fillmore served in the New York State Assembly; another uncle, Simeon Fillmore, served as town supervisor of Clarence, New York.) Millard became interested in politics, and the rise of the Anti-Masonic Party in the late 1820s provided his entry.

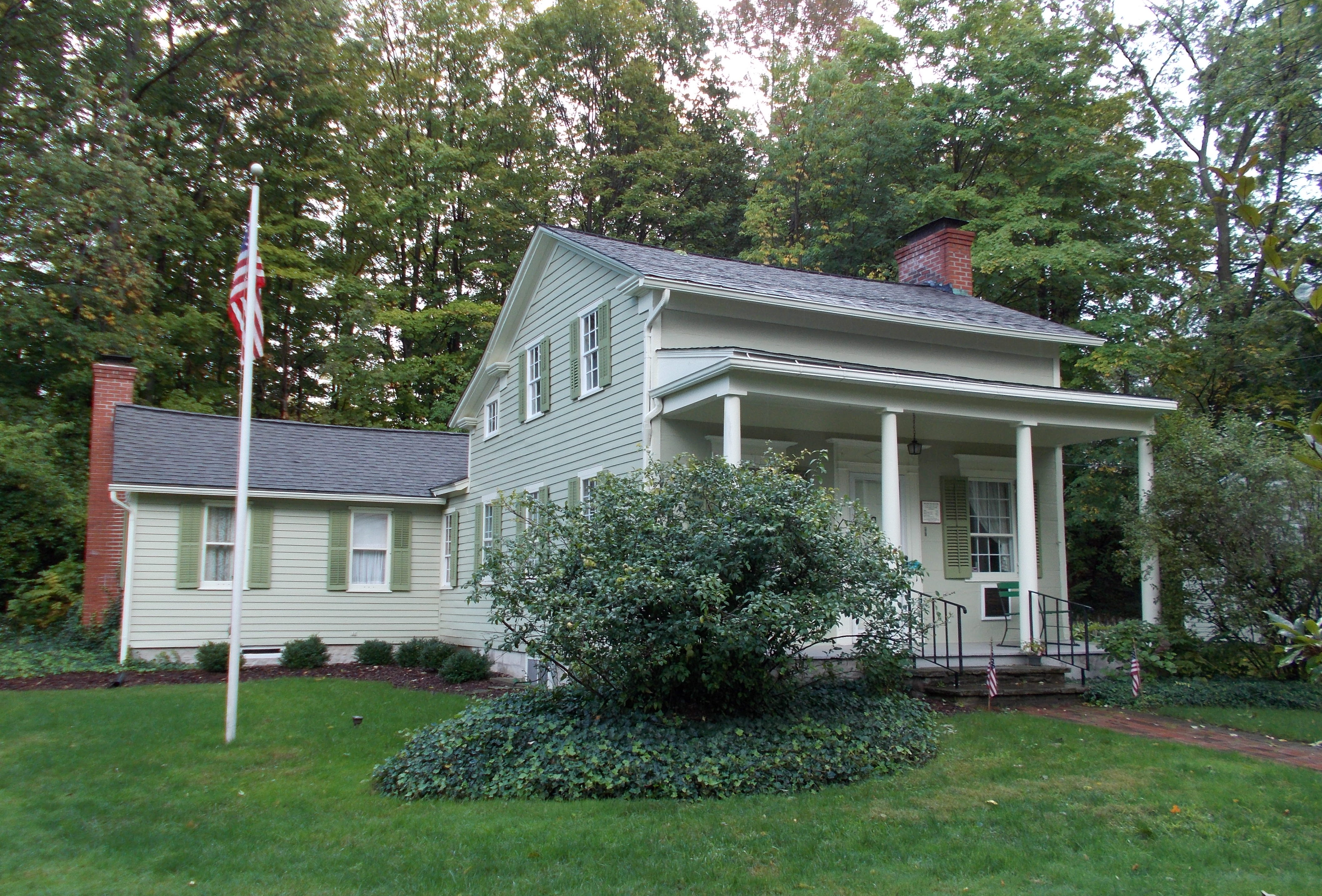
Millard Fillmore helped build this house in East Aurora, New York, and lived there from 1826 to 1830.

External videos
- Tour of Millard Fillmore House Museum, East Aurora, New York, August 19, 1995, C-SPAN

Many Anti-Masons were opposed to the presidential candidacy of General Andrew Jackson, who was a Mason. Fillmore was a delegate to the New York convention that endorsed President John Quincy Adams for reelection and also served at two Anti-Masonic conventions in the summer of 1828. At the conventions, Fillmore first met political boss and future rival Thurlow Weed, then a newspaper editor, where they reportedly impressed one another. Fillmore was the leading citizen in East Aurora, having successfully sought election to the New York State Assembly, and served in Albany for three one-year terms (1829 to 1831). Fillmore's 1828 election contrasted with the general victory of the Jacksonian Democrats (soon the Democratic Party), who elected Jackson President and won a majority in Albany. Thus Fillmore was in the minority in the Assembly. He proved effective anyway by promoting legislation to provide court witnesses the option of taking a non-religious oath, and in 1830, abolishing imprisonment for debt. By then much of Fillmore's legal practice was in Buffalo, and later that year he moved there with his family. He did not seek reelection in 1831.

Fillmore was successful as a lawyer. Buffalo was rapidly expanding, recovering from being burnt by British forces during the War of 1812, and becoming the western terminus of the Erie Canal. Court cases from outside Erie County began falling to Fillmore's lot, and he reached prominence as a lawyer in Buffalo before he moved there. He took his lifelong friend Nathan K. Hall as a law clerk in East Aurora. Hall later became Fillmore's partner in Buffalo. Buffalo was legally a village when Fillmore arrived; although the bill to incorporate it as a city passed the legislature after he had left the Assembly, Fillmore helped draft the city charter.

Fillmore helped found the Buffalo High School Association, joined the lyceum, attended the local Unitarian church, and became a leading citizen of Buffalo. He was also active in the New York Militia and attained the rank of major as inspector of the 47th Brigade.

== Representative ==
=== First term and return to Buffalo ===
In 1832 Fillmore ran successfully for the U.S. House of Representatives. The Anti-Masonic presidential candidate, William Wirt, a former attorney general, won only Vermont, and President Jackson easily gained reelection. At the time, Congress convened its annual session in December and so Fillmore had to wait more than a year after his election to take his seat. Fillmore, Weed, and others realized that opposition to Masonry was too narrow a foundation to build a national party. They formed the broad-based Whig Party from National Republicans, Anti-Masons, and disaffected Democrats. The Whigs were initially united by their opposition to Jackson but became a major party by expanding their platform to include support for economic growth through rechartering the Second Bank of the United States and federally-funded internal improvements, including roads, bridges, and canals. Weed had joined the Whigs before Fillmore and became a power within the party. Weed's anti-slavery views were stronger than those of Fillmore, who disliked slavery but considered the federal government powerless over it. They were closer to those of another prominent New York Whig, William H. Seward of Auburn, who was seen as a Weed protégé.

In Washington Fillmore urged the expansion of Buffalo harbor, a decision under federal jurisdiction, and he privately lobbied Albany for the expansion of the state-owned Erie Canal. Even during the 1832 campaign, Fillmore's affiliation as an Anti-Mason had been uncertain, and he rapidly shed the label once sworn in. Fillmore came to the notice of the influential Massachusetts Senator Daniel Webster, who took the new representative under his wing. Fillmore became a firm supporter, and they continued their close relationship until Webster's death late in Fillmore's presidency. Despite Fillmore's support of the Second Bank as a means for national development, he did not speak in the congressional debates in which some advocated renewing its charter although Jackson had vetoed legislation for a charter renewal. Fillmore supported building infrastructure by voting in favor of navigation improvements on the Hudson River and constructing a bridge across the Potomac River.

Anti-Masonry was still strong in Western New York though it was petering out nationally. When the Anti-Masons did not nominate him for a second term in 1834, Fillmore declined the Whig nomination, seeing that the two parties would split the anti-Jackson vote and elect the Democrat. Despite Fillmore's departure from office, he was a rival for the state party leadership with Seward, the unsuccessful 1834 Whig gubernatorial candidate. Fillmore spent his time out of office building his law practice and boosting the Whig Party, which gradually absorbed most of the Anti-Masons. By 1836 Fillmore was confident enough of anti-Jackson unity that he accepted the Whig nomination for Congress. Democrats, led by their presidential candidate, Vice President Martin Van Buren, were victorious nationwide and in Van Buren's home state of New York, but Western New York voted Whig and sent Fillmore back to Washington.

=== Second to fourth terms ===
Van Buren, faced with the economic Panic of 1837, which was caused partly by the lack of confidence in private banknote issues after Jackson had instructed the government to accept only gold or silver, called a special session of Congress. Government money had been held in so-called "pet banks" since Jackson had withdrawn it from the Second Bank. Van Buren proposed to place funds in sub-treasuries, government depositories that would not lend money. Believing that government funds should be lent to develop the country, Fillmore felt it would lock the nation's limited supply of gold money away from commerce. Van Buren's sub-treasury and other economic proposals passed, but as hard times continued, the Whigs saw an increased vote in the 1837 elections and captured the New York Assembly, which set up a fight for the 1838 gubernatorial nomination. Fillmore supported the leading Whig vice-presidential candidate from 1836, Francis Granger, but Weed preferred Seward. Fillmore was embittered when Weed got the nomination for Seward but campaigned loyally, Seward was elected, and Fillmore won another term in the House.

The rivalry between Fillmore and Seward was affected by the growing anti-slavery movement. Although Fillmore disliked slavery, he saw no reason for it to be a political issue. Seward, however, made his hostility to slavery clear as governor by refusing to return slaves claimed by Southerners. When the Buffalo bar proposed Fillmore for the position of vice-chancellor of the eighth judicial district in 1839, Seward refused, nominated Frederick Whittlesey, and indicated that if the New York Senate rejected Whittlesey he still would not appoint Fillmore.

Fillmore was active in the discussions of presidential candidates which preceded the Whig National Convention for the 1840 race. He initially supported General Winfield Scott but really wanted to defeat Kentucky Senator Henry Clay, a slaveholder who he felt could not carry New York State. Fillmore did not attend the convention but was gratified when it nominated General William Henry Harrison for president, with former Virginia Senator John Tyler his running mate. Fillmore organized Western New York for the Harrison campaign, and the national ticket was elected, and Fillmore easily gained a fourth term in the House.

At the urging of Clay, Harrison quickly called a special session of Congress. With the Whigs able to organize the House for the first time, Fillmore sought the Speakership, but it went to a Clay acolyte, John White of Kentucky. Fillmore was made chairman of the House Ways and Means Committee. Harrison was expected to go along with anything Clay and other congressional Whig leaders proposed, but Harrison died on April 4, 1841. Vice President Tyler was elevated to the presidency; the onetime maverick Democrat soon broke with Clay over congressional proposals for a national bank to stabilize the currency, which he vetoed twice and so was expelled from the Whig Party. Fillmore remained on the fringes of that conflict by generally supporting the congressional Whig position, but his chief achievement as Ways and Means chairman was the Tariff of 1842. The existing tariff did not protect manufacturing, and part of the revenue was distributed to the states, a decision made in better times that was now depleting the Treasury. Fillmore prepared a bill raising tariff rates that was popular in the country, but the continuation of distribution assured Tyler's veto and much political advantage for the Whigs. A House committee, headed by Massachusetts's John Quincy Adams, condemned Tyler's actions. Fillmore prepared a second bill, now omitting distribution. When it reached Tyler's desk, he signed it but, in the process, offended his erstwhile Democratic allies. Thus Fillmore not only achieved his legislative goal but also managed to isolate Tyler politically.

Fillmore received praise for the tariff, but in July 1842, aged 42, he announced he would not seek reelection. The Whigs nominated him anyway, but he refused the nomination. Tired of Washington life and the conflict that had revolved around Tyler, Fillmore sought to return to his life and law practice in Buffalo. He continued to be active in the lame duck session of Congress that followed the 1842 elections and returned to Buffalo in April 1843, at age 43. According to his biographer, Scarry, "Fillmore concluded his Congressional career at a point when he had become a powerful figure, an able statesman at the height of his popularity."

Weed deemed Fillmore "able in debate, wise in council, and inflexible in his political sentiments".

== National figure ==
Out of office, Fillmore continued his law practice and made long-neglected repairs to his Buffalo home. He remained a major political figure and led the committee that welcomed John Quincy Adams to Buffalo. The former president expressed his regret at Fillmore's absence from Congress. Some urged Fillmore to run for vice president with Clay, the consensus Whig choice for president in 1844. Horace Greeley wrote privately that "my own first choice has long been Millard Fillmore," and others thought Fillmore should try to win back the governor's mansion for the Whigs. Seeking to return to Washington, Fillmore wanted the vice presidency.

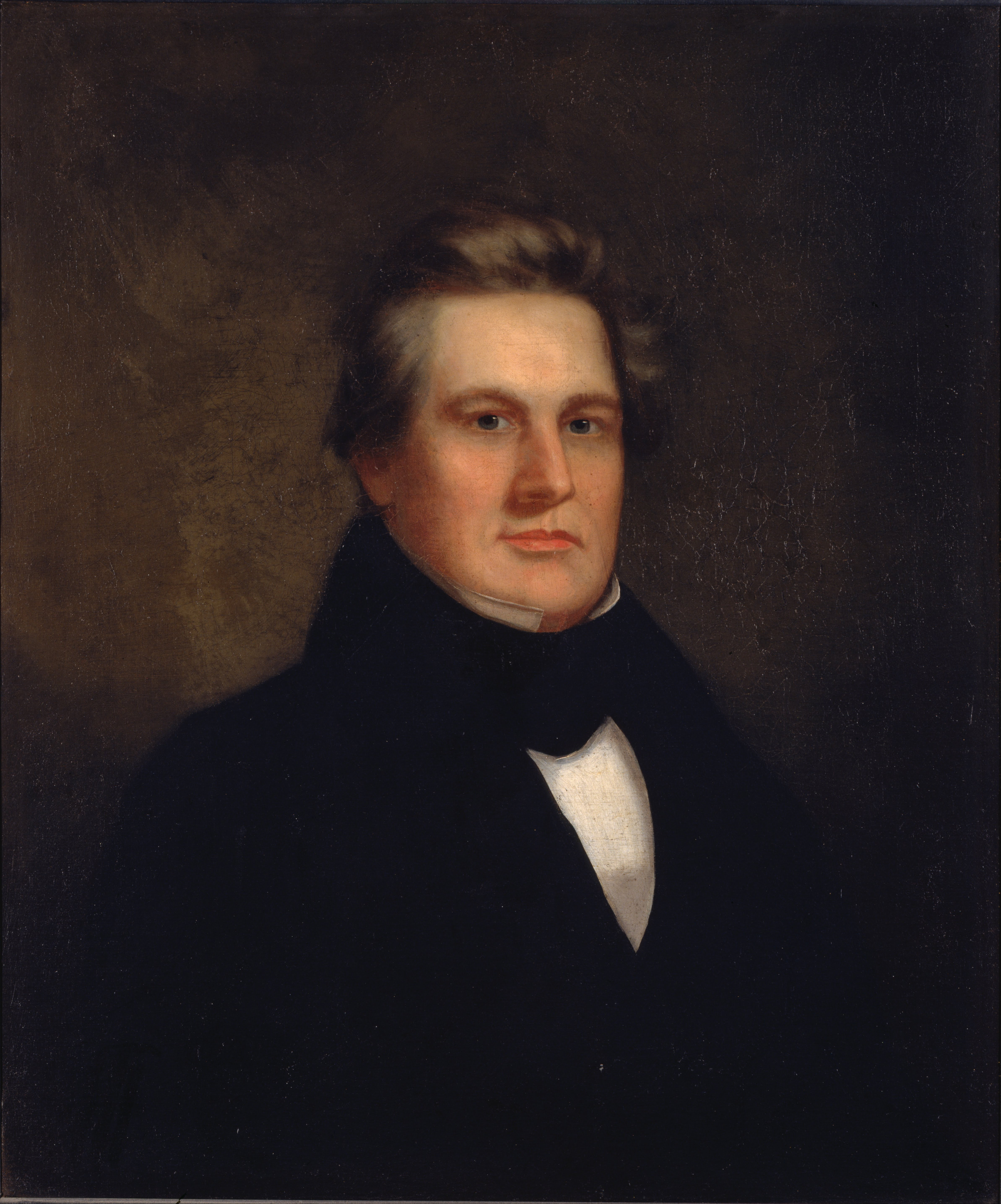
Fillmore c. 1843, artist unknown

Fillmore hoped to gain the endorsement of the New York delegation to the national convention, but Weed wanted the vice presidency for Seward, with Fillmore as governor. Seward, though, withdrew before the 1844 Whig National Convention. When Weed's replacement vice presidential hopeful, Willis Hall, fell ill, Weed sought to defeat Fillmore's candidacy to force him to run for governor. Weed's attempts to boost Fillmore as a gubernatorial candidate caused the latter to write, "I am not willing to be treacherously killed by this pretended kindness ... do not suppose for a minute that I think they desire my nomination for governor." New York sent a delegation to the convention in Baltimore pledged to support Clay but with no instructions as to how to vote for vice president. Weed told out-of-state delegates that the New York party preferred to have Fillmore as its gubernatorial candidate, and after Clay was nominated for president, the second place on the ticket fell to former New Jersey senator Theodore Frelinghuysen.

Putting a good face on his defeat, Fillmore met and publicly appeared with Frelinghuysen and quietly spurned Weed's offer to get him nominated as governor at the state convention. Fillmore's position in opposing slavery only at the state level made him acceptable as a statewide Whig candidate, and Weed saw to it the pressure on Fillmore increased. Fillmore had stated that a convention had the right to draft anyone for political service, and Weed got the convention to choose Fillmore, who had broad support, despite his reluctance.

The Democrats nominated Senator Silas Wright as their gubernatorial candidate and former Tennessee Governor James K. Polk for president. Although Fillmore worked to gain support among German-Americans, a major constituency, he was hurt among immigrants by the fact that in New York City, Whigs had supported a nativist candidate in the mayoral election earlier in 1844, and Fillmore and his party were tarred with that brush. He was not friendly to immigrants and blamed his defeat on "foreign Catholics". Clay was beaten as well. Fillmore's biographer Paul Finkelman suggested that Fillmore's hostility to immigrants and his weak position on slavery had defeated him for governor.

In 1846 Fillmore was involved in the founding of the University of Buffalo (now the University at Buffalo), became its first chancellor, and served until his death in 1874. He had opposed the annexation of Texas, spoke against the subsequent Mexican–American War, and saw the war as a contrivance to extend slavery's realm. Fillmore was angered when President Polk vetoed a river and harbors bill that would have benefited Buffalo, and he wrote, "May God save the country for it is evident the people will not." At the time, New York governors served a two-year term, and Fillmore could have had the Whig nomination in 1846 had he wanted it. He actually came within one vote of it while he maneuvered to get the nomination for his supporter, John Young, who was elected. A new constitution for New York State provided the office of comptroller to be made elective, as were the attorney general and some other positions that were formerly chosen by the state legislature. Fillmore's work in finance as the Ways and Means chairman made him an obvious candidate for comptroller, and he was successful in getting the Whig nomination for the 1847 election. With a united party, Fillmore won by 38,000 votes, the largest margin that a Whig candidate for statewide office would ever achieve in New York.

Before moving to Albany to take office on January 1, 1848, he had left his law firm and rented out his house. Fillmore received positive reviews for his service as comptroller. In that office he was a member of the state canal board, supported its expansion, and saw that it was managed competently. He secured an enlargement of Buffalo's canal facilities. The comptroller regulated the banks, and Fillmore stabilized the currency by requiring that state-chartered banks keep New York and federal bonds to the value of the banknotes they issued. A similar plan was adopted by Congress in 1864.

== Election of 1848 ==
=== Nomination ===
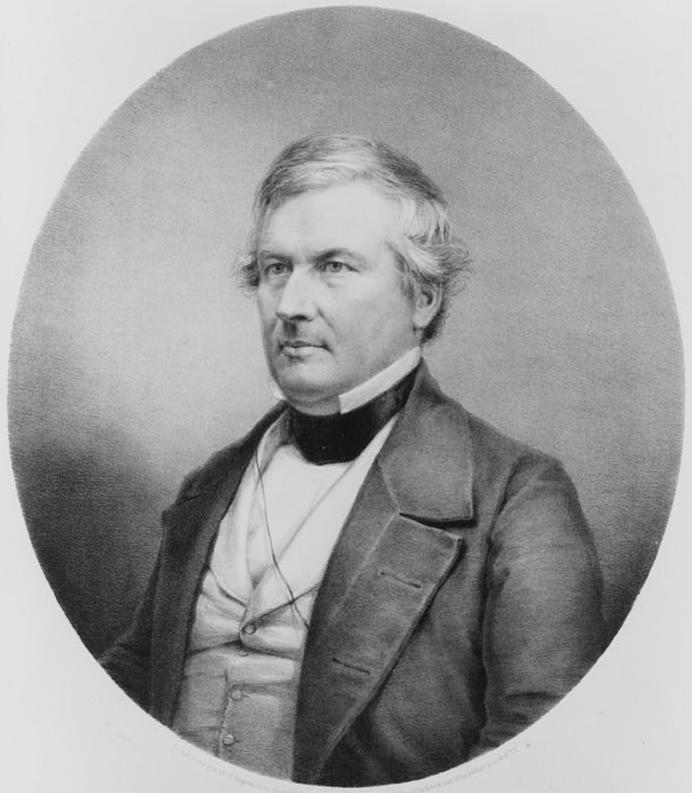
Engraving of Fillmore

President Polk had pledged not to seek a second term, and with gains in Congress during the 1846 election cycle, the Whigs were hopeful of taking the White House in 1848. The party's perennial candidates, Henry Clay and Daniel Webster, both wanted the nomination and amassed support from congressional colleagues. Many rank-and-file Whigs backed the Mexican War hero General Zachary Taylor for president. Although Taylor was extremely popular, many Northerners had qualms about electing a Louisiana slaveholder at a time of sectional tension over whether slavery should be allowed in the territories that had been ceded by Mexico. Taylor's uncertain political views gave others pause: his career in the Army had prevented him from ever casting a ballot for president though he stated that he was a Whig supporter. Some feared that they might elect another Tyler, or another Harrison.

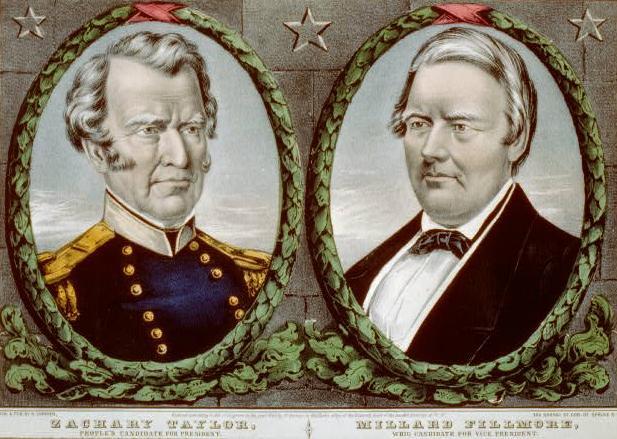
Taylor (left) – Fillmore campaign banner by Nathaniel Currier

With the nomination undecided, Weed maneuvered for New York to send an uncommitted delegation to the 1848 Whig National Convention in the hope of placing Seward on the ticket or getting him a Cabinet appointment. He persuaded Fillmore to support an uncommitted ticket but did not reveal his hopes for Seward. Weed was an influential editor with whom Fillmore tended to cooperate for the good of the Whig Party. Weed had sterner opponents, though, such as Governor Young, who disliked Seward and did not want to see him gain high office.

Despite Weed's efforts, Taylor was nominated on the fourth ballot, to the anger of Clay's supporters and of Conscience Whigs from the Northeast. When order had been restored, John A. Collier, a New Yorker who opposed Weed, addressed the convention. Delegates hung on his every word as he described himself as a Clay partisan; he had voted for Clay on each ballot. He eloquently described the grief of the Clay supporters, frustrated again in their battle to make Clay president. Collier warned of a fatal breach in the party and said that only one thing could prevent it: the vice-presidential nomination of Fillmore, whom he depicted as a strong Clay supporter. Fillmore actually agreed with many of Clay's positions but did not back him for president and was not in Philadelphia. Delegates did not know what Collier had said was false or at least greatly exaggerated and there was a large reaction in Fillmore's favor.

Abbott Lawrence of Massachusetts was a key Taylor supporter and expected to be nominated for vice president. The chairman of the Vermont delegation, former Representative Solomon Foot, initially supported Lawrence, who was perceived as more accepting of slavery than Fillmore. Recognizing that the Whigs would likely collapse if Lawrence was nominated and northern anti-slavery delegates left the party, Foot agreed to shift his support to Fillmore. Other delegates soon followed suit, and Fillmore won the nomination on the second ballot.

Under the political customs of the time, if Taylor and Fillmore were elected, no one else from New York could be named to the Cabinet, meaning Weed's ambitions for Seward were frustrated, at least temporarily. Fillmore was accused of complicity in Collier's actions, but that was never substantiated. Nevertheless, there were sound reasons for Fillmore's selection, as he was a proven vote-getter from electorally crucial New York, and his track record in Congress and as a candidate showed his devotion to Whig doctrine, allaying fears he might be another Tyler were something to happen to Taylor. Delegates remembered him for his role in the Tariff of 1842, and he had been mentioned as a vice-presidential possibility, along with Lawrence and Ohio's Thomas Ewing. His rivalry with Seward, who was subsequently elected to the U.S. Senate and was already known for anti-slavery views, made Fillmore more acceptable in the South.

=== General election ===

It was customary in the mid-19th century for a candidate for high office not to appear to seek it. Fillmore thus remained at the comptroller's office in Albany and made no speeches. The 1848 campaign was conducted in the newspapers and with addresses made by surrogates at rallies. The Democrats nominated Senator Lewis Cass of Michigan for president and General William O. Butler as his running mate, but it became a three-way fight since the Free Soil Party, which opposed the spread of slavery, chose ex-President Van Buren. There was a crisis among the Whigs when Taylor also accepted the presidential nomination of a group of dissident South Carolina Democrats. In late August, fearing that Taylor would be a party apostate like Tyler, Weed scheduled a rally in Albany aimed at electing an uncommitted slate of presidential electors. Fillmore interceded with Weed and assured him that Taylor was loyal to the party.

Northerners assumed that Fillmore, hailing from a free state, opposed the spread of slavery. Southerners accused him of being an abolitionist, which he hotly denied. Fillmore responded to one Alabamian in a widely published letter that slavery was an evil, but the federal government had no authority over it. Taylor and Fillmore corresponded twice in September, with Taylor happy that the crisis over the South Carolinians was resolved. Fillmore assured his running mate that the electoral prospects for the ticket looked good, especially in the Northeast.

In the end the Taylor-Fillmore ticket won narrowly, with New York's electoral votes again key. The Whig ticket won the popular vote by 1,361,393 (47.3%) to 1,223,460 (42.5%) and triumphed 163 to 127 in the Electoral College. (Note: South Carolina did not yet use the popular vote for choosing electors, with the legislature electing them instead.) Minor-party candidates took no electoral votes, but the strength of the burgeoning anti-slavery movement was shown by the vote for Van Buren, who won no states but earned 291,501 votes (10.1%) and finished second in New York, Vermont, and Massachusetts.

== Vice presidency (1849–1850) ==
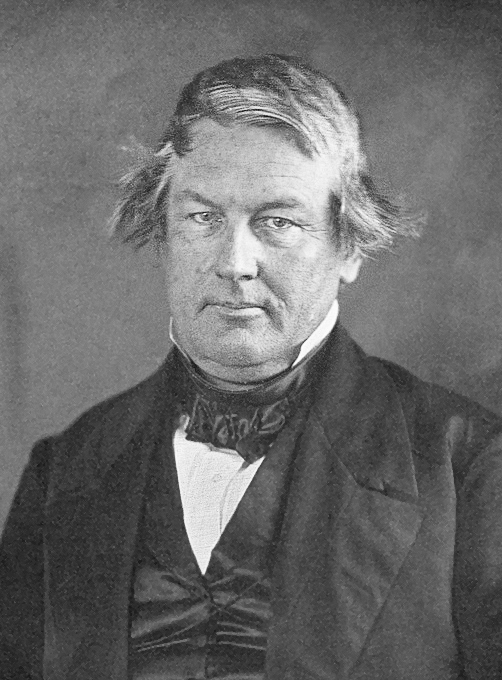
Fillmore photographed in 1849 by Mathew Brady

Fillmore was sworn in as vice president on March 5, 1849, in the Senate Chamber. Since March 4 (which was then Inauguration Day) fell on a Sunday, the swearing-in was postponed to the following day. Fillmore took the oath from Chief Justice Roger B. Taney and, in turn, swore in the senators beginning their terms, including Seward, who had been elected by the New York legislature in February. (Note: Until 1913 senators were elected by the state legislatures, not by the people.)

Fillmore had spent the four months between the election and the swearing-in being feted by the New York Whigs and winding up affairs in the comptroller's office. Taylor had written to him and promised influence in the new administration. The president-elect mistakenly thought that the vice president was a cabinet member, which was not true in the 19th century. Fillmore, Seward and Weed had met and come to a general agreement on how to divide federal jobs in New York. Once he went to Washington, Seward made friendly contact with Taylor's cabinet nominees, advisers, and the general's brother. An alliance between the incoming administration and the Weed machine was soon formed behind Fillmore's back. In exchange for support, Seward and Weed were allowed to designate who was to fill federal jobs in New York, and Fillmore was given far less influence than had been agreed. When Fillmore discovered that after the election, he went to Taylor, which only made the warfare against Fillmore's influence more open. Fillmore's supporters such as Collier, who had nominated him at the convention, were passed over for candidates backed by Weed, who was triumphant even in Buffalo. That greatly increased Weed's influence in New York politics and diminished Fillmore's. According to Rayback, "by mid-1849, Fillmore's situation had become desperate." Despite his lack of influence, office-seekers pestered him, as did those with a house to lease or sell since there was no official vice-presidential residence at the time. He enjoyed one aspect of his office because of his lifelong love of learning: he became deeply involved in the administration of the Smithsonian Institution as a member ex officio of its Board of Regents.

Through 1849, slavery was an unresolved issue in the territories. Taylor advocated the admission of California and New Mexico, (Note: The modern-day states of New Mexico and Arizona, less the Gadsden Purchase) which were both likely to outlaw slavery. Southerners were surprised to learn the president, despite being a Southern slaveholder, did not support the introduction of slavery into the new territories, as he believed the institution could not flourish in the arid Southwest. There was anger across party lines in the South, where making the territories free of slavery was considered to exclude Southerners from part of the national heritage. When Congress met in December 1849, the discord was manifested in the election for Speaker, which took weeks and dozens of ballots to resolve, as the House divided along sectional lines.

Fillmore countered the Weed machine by building a network of like-minded Whigs in New York State. With backing from wealthy New Yorkers, their positions were publicized by the establishment of a rival newspaper to Weed's Albany Evening Journal. All pretense at friendship between Fillmore and Weed vanished in November 1849 when they happened to meet in New York City and exchanged accusations.

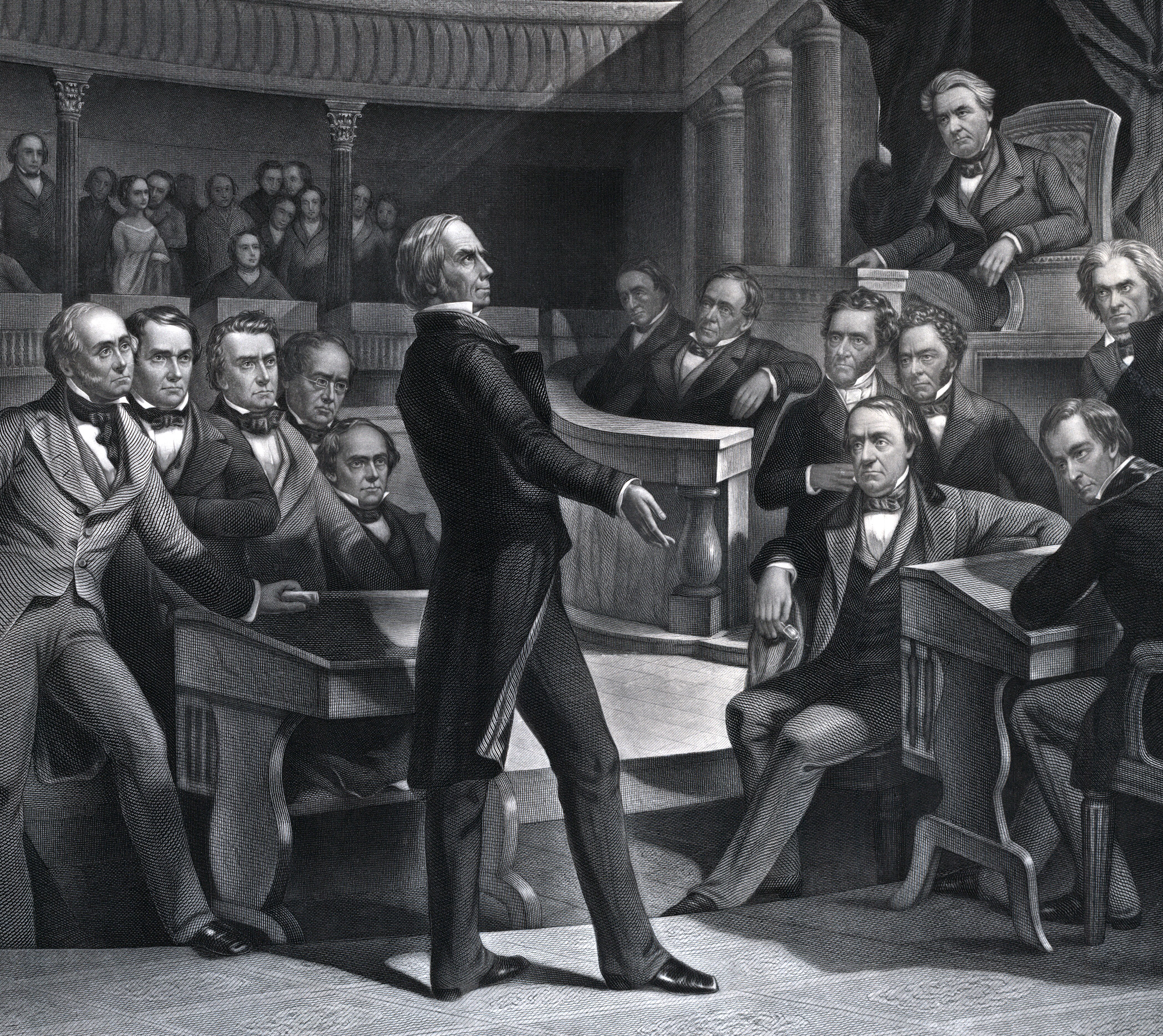
From a Peter F. Rothermel engraving: Vice President Fillmore (upper right) presides over the Compromise debates as Henry Clay takes the floor of the Old Senate Chamber. John C. Calhoun (seen in part standing just to Fillmore's right) and Daniel Webster (seated to the left of Clay) look on.

Fillmore presided (Note: The U.S. Constitution designates the vice president as the Senate's presiding officer.) over some of the most momentous and passionate debates in American history as the Senate debated whether to allow slavery in the territories. The ongoing sectional conflict had already excited much discussion when on January 21, 1850, President Taylor sent a special message to Congress that urged the admission of California immediately and New Mexico later and for the Supreme Court to settle the boundary dispute whereby the state of Texas claimed much of what is now the state of New Mexico. On January 29, Clay introduced his "Omnibus Bill", (Note: The term derives from the transportation vehicle, as the bill carries all the related proposals as "passengers".) which would give victories to both North and South by admitting California as a free state, organizing territorial governments in New Mexico and Utah, and banning the slave trade in the District of Columbia. The bill would also toughen the Fugitive Slave Act of 1793, as resistance to enforcement in parts of the North had been a longtime Southern grievance. Clay's bill provided for the settlement of the Texas–New Mexico boundary dispute, and the status of slavery in the territories would be decided by those living there (popular sovereignty). Taylor was unenthusiastic about the bill, which languished in Congress. After weeks of debate, Fillmore informed him in May 1850 that if senators divided equally on the bill, he would cast his tie-breaking vote in favor. Fillmore did his best to keep the peace among the senators and reminded them of the vice president's power to rule them out of order, but he was blamed for failing to maintain the peace when a physical confrontation between Mississippi's Henry S. Foote and Missouri's Thomas Hart Benton broke out on April 17. Before other senators intervened to separate them, Foote pointed a gun at his colleague as Benton advanced on him.

== Presidency (1850–1853) ==
=== Succession amid crisis ===
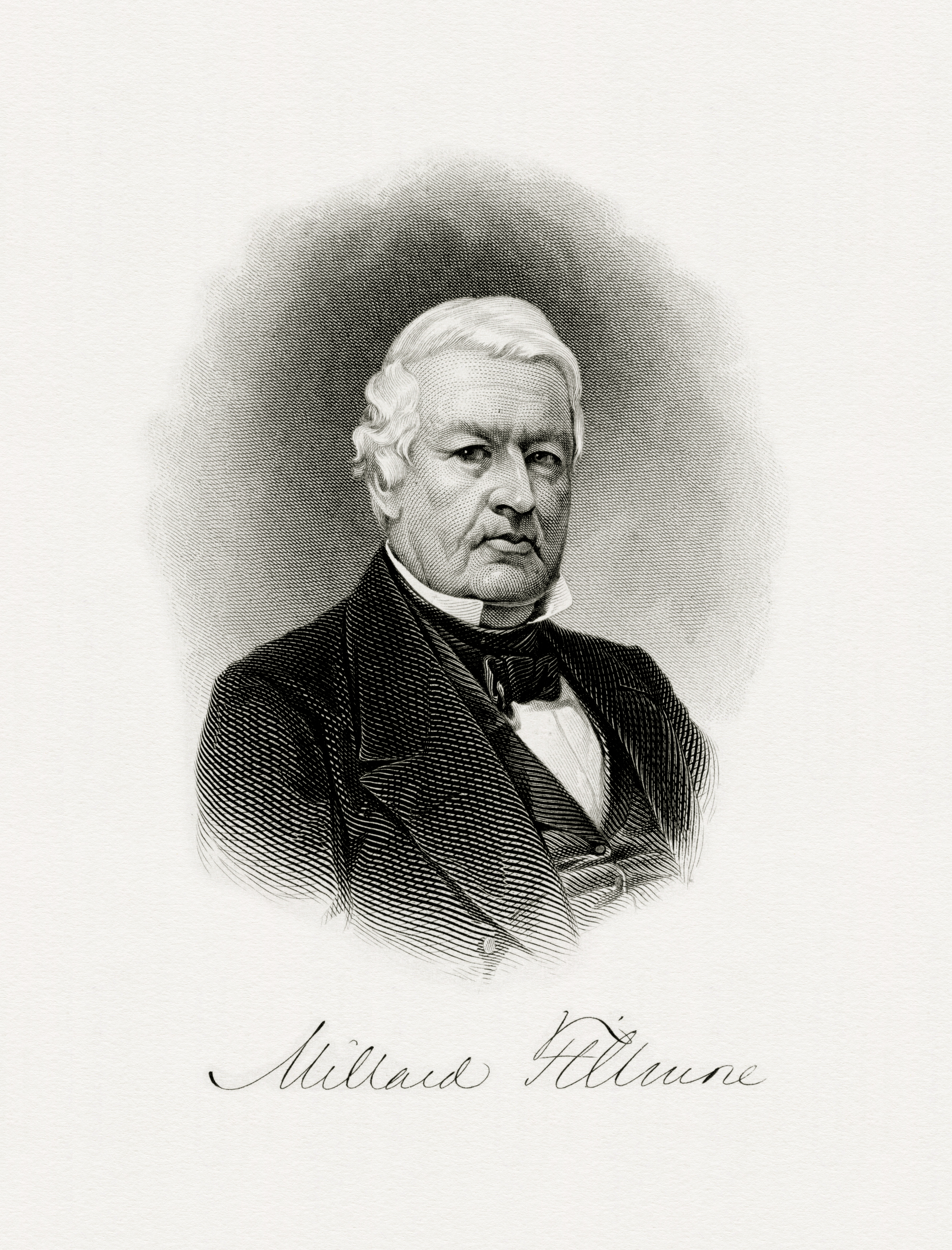
BEP-engraved portrait of Fillmore as president

July 4, 1850, was a very hot day in Washington, and President Taylor, who attended the Fourth of July ceremonies to lay the cornerstone of the Washington Monument, refreshed himself, likely with cold milk and cherries. What he consumed likely gave him gastroenteritis and he died on July 9, aged 65. Nicknamed "Old Rough and Ready", Taylor had gained a reputation for toughness through his military campaigning in the heat, and his sudden death shocked the nation.

Fillmore had been called from his chair presiding over the Senate on July 8 and had sat with members of the cabinet in a vigil outside Taylor's bedroom at the White House. He received formal notification of the president's death on the evening of July 9 in his residence at the Willard Hotel. After acknowledging the letter and spending a sleepless night, Fillmore went to the House of Representatives, where, at a joint session of Congress, he took the oath as president from William Cranch, the chief judge of the federal court for the District of Columbia, and the man who swore in President Tyler. The cabinet officers, as was customary when a new president took over, submitted their resignations but expected Fillmore to refuse and allow them to continue in office. He had been marginalized by the cabinet members, and he accepted the resignations though he asked them to stay on for a month, which most refused to do. Fillmore is the only president who succeeded by death or resignation not to retain, at least initially, his predecessor's cabinet. He was already in discussions with Whig leaders and, on July 20, began to send new nominations to the Senate, with the Fillmore Cabinet to be led by Webster as Secretary of State. Webster had outraged his Massachusetts constituents by supporting Clay's bill and, with his Senate term to expire in 1851, had no political future in his home state. Fillmore appointed his old law partner, Nathan Hall, as Postmaster General, a cabinet position that controlled many patronage appointments. The new department heads were mostly supporters of the Compromise, like Fillmore.

The brief pause from politics out of national grief at Taylor's death did not abate the crisis. Texas had attempted to assert its authority in New Mexico, and the state's governor, Peter H. Bell, had sent belligerent letters to President Taylor. Fillmore received another letter after he had become president. He reinforced federal troops in the area and warned Bell to keep the peace.

By July 31 Clay's bill was effectively dead, as all significant provisions other than the organization of Utah Territory had been removed by amendment. As one wag put it, the "Mormons" were the only remaining passengers on the omnibus. Illinois Senator Stephen A. Douglas then stepped to the fore, with Clay's agreement, proposing to break the omnibus bill into individual bills that could be passed piecemeal. Fillmore endorsed that strategy, which eventually divided the compromise into five bills.

Fillmore sent a special message to Congress on August 6, 1850; disclosed the letter from Governor Bell and his reply; warned that armed Texans would be viewed as intruders; and urged Congress to defuse sectional tensions by passing the Compromise. Without the presence of the Great Triumvirate of John C. Calhoun, Webster, and Clay, who had long dominated the Senate, (Note: Calhoun was dead, Webster was Secretary of State, and Clay was absent since he was recovering in Newport, Rhode Island from his exertions on behalf of the bill.) Douglas and others were able to lead the Senate towards the administration-backed package of bills. Each bill passed the Senate with the support of the section that wanted it, with a few members who were determined to see all the bills passed. The battle then moved to the House, which had a Northern majority because of population. Most contentious was the Fugitive Slave Bill, whose provisions were anathema to abolitionists. Fillmore applied pressure to get Northern Whigs, including New Yorkers, to abstain, rather than to oppose the bill. Through the legislative process, changes were made, including the setting of a boundary between New Mexico Territory and Texas, the state being given a payment to settle any claims. California was admitted as a free state, the District of Columbia's slave trade was ended, and the final status of slavery in New Mexico and Utah would be settled later. Fillmore signed the bills as they reached his desk and held the Fugitive Slave Bill for two days until he received a favorable opinion as to its constitutionality from the new Attorney General, John J. Crittenden. Although some Northerners were unhappy at the Fugitive Slave Act, relief was widespread in the hope of settling the slavery question.

=== Domestic affairs ===
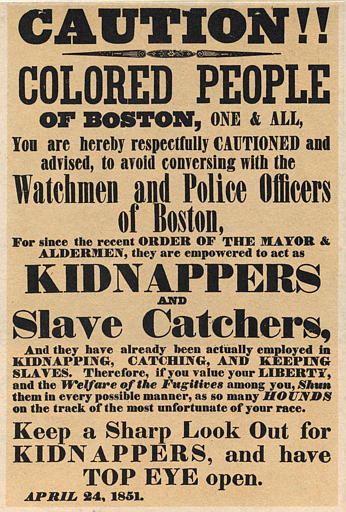

The Fugitive Slave Act remained contentious after its enactment. Southerners complained bitterly about any leniency in its application, but its enforcement was highly offensive to many Northerners. Abolitionists recited the inequities of the law since anyone aiding an escaped slave was punished severely, and it granted no due process to the escapee, who could not testify before a magistrate. The law also permitted a higher payment to the hearing magistrate for deciding the escapee was a slave. Nevertheless, Fillmore believed himself bound by his oath as president and by the bargain that had been made in the Compromise to enforce the Fugitive Slave Act. He did so even though some prosecutions or attempts to return slaves ended badly for the government; there were acquittals, and in one incident a slave was taken from federal custody and freed by a Boston mob. Such cases were widely publicized North and South, inflamed passions in both places, and undermined the good feeling that had followed the Compromise.

In August 1850 the social reformer Dorothea Dix wrote to Fillmore to urge support of her proposal in Congress for land grants to finance asylums for the impoverished mentally ill. Though her proposal did not pass, they became friends, met in person, and continued to correspond well after Fillmore's presidency.

In September 1850 Fillmore appointed the Church of Jesus Christ of Latter-day Saints leader Brigham Young as the first governor of Utah Territory. In gratitude, Young named the first territorial capital "Fillmore" and the surrounding county "Millard".

A longtime supporter of national infrastructure development, Fillmore signed bills to subsidize the Illinois Central railroad from Chicago to Mobile, and a canal at Sault Ste. Marie. The 1851 completion of the Erie Railroad in New York prompted Fillmore and his cabinet to ride the first train from New York City to Lake Erie, in the company of many other dignitaries. Fillmore made many speeches along the way from the train's rear platform, urged acceptance of the Compromise, and later went on a tour of New England with his Southern cabinet members. Although Fillmore urged Congress to authorize a transcontinental railroad, it did not do so until a decade later.

Fillmore appointed one justice to the Supreme Court of the United States and four to United States district courts, including his law partner and cabinet officer, Nathan Hall, to the federal district court in Buffalo. When Supreme Court Justice Levi Woodbury died in September 1851 with the Senate not in session, Fillmore made a recess appointment of Benjamin Robbins Curtis to the Court. In December, with Congress convened, Fillmore formally nominated Curtis, who was confirmed. In 1857 Justice Curtis dissented from the Court's decision in the slavery case of Dred Scott v. Sandford and resigned as a matter of principle shortly after.

Justice John McKinley's death in 1852 led to repeated fruitless attempts by the president to fill the vacancy. The Senate took no action on the nomination of the New Orleans attorney Edward A. Bradford. Fillmore's second choice, George Edmund Badger, asked for his name to be withdrawn. Senator-elect Judah P. Benjamin declined to serve. The nomination of William C. Micou, a New Orleans lawyer recommended by Benjamin, was not acted on by the Senate. The vacancy was filled after Fillmore's term, when President Franklin Pierce nominated John Archibald Campbell, who was confirmed by the Senate.

=== Foreign relations ===
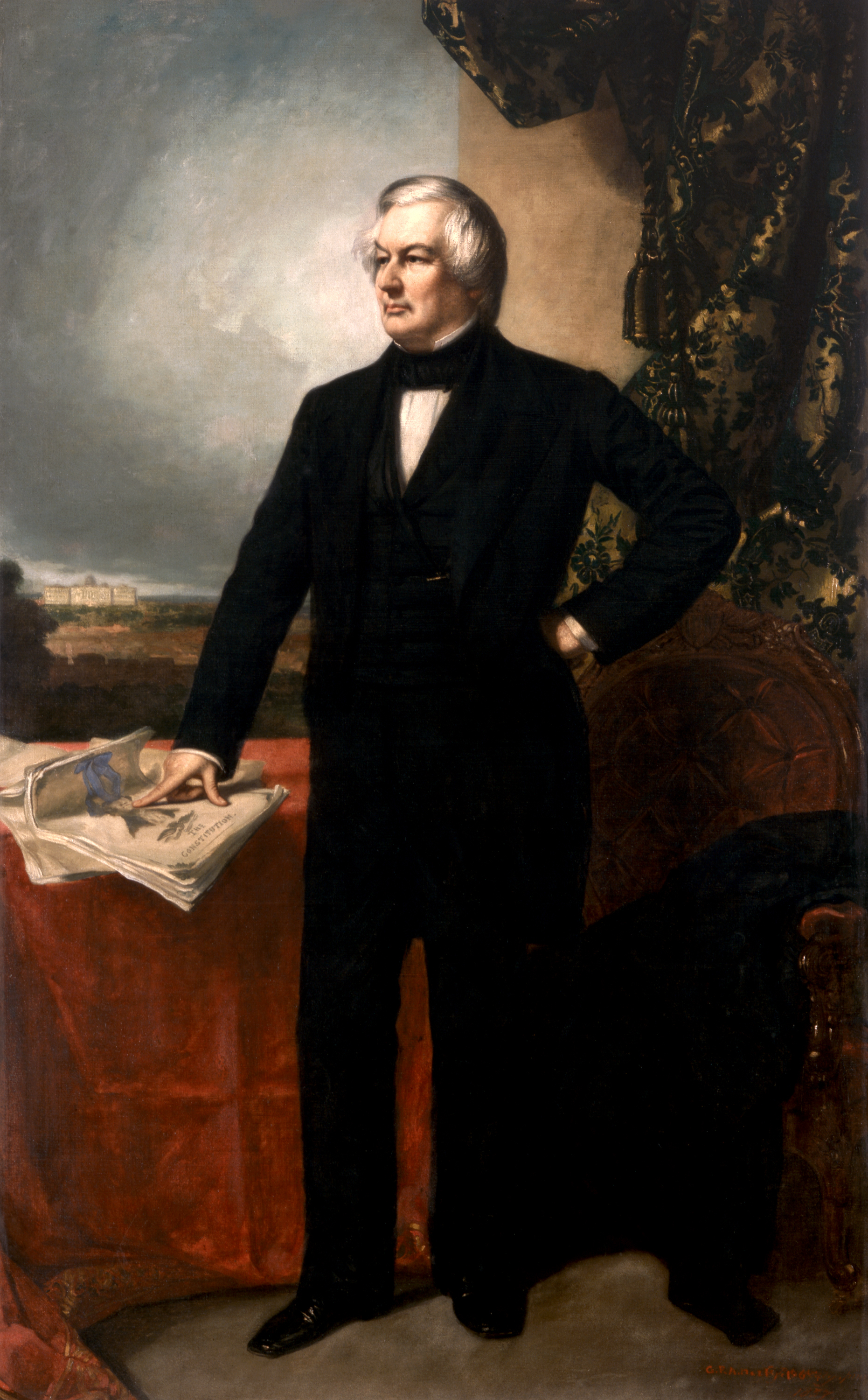
Official portrait of Fillmore by George Peter Alexander Healy, c. 1857

Fillmore oversaw two highly competent Secretaries of State: Daniel Webster, and after Webster's 1852 death, Edward Everett. Fillmore made all major decisions. He was particularly active in Asia and the Pacific, especially with regard to Japan, which then still prohibited nearly all foreign contact. American merchants and shipowners wanted Japan "opened up", which would allow commerce and permit American ships to call there for provisions and in emergencies without being punished. They were concerned that American sailors cast away on the Japanese coast were imprisoned. Fillmore and Webster dispatched Commodore Matthew C. Perry on the Perry Expedition to open Japan to the outside world. Perry and his ships reached Japan in July 1853, four months after the end of Fillmore's term.

Fillmore was a staunch opponent of European influence in Hawaii. France, under Emperor Napoleon III, sought to annex Hawaii but backed down after Fillmore issued a strongly-worded message warning that "the United States would not stand for any such action."

Taylor had pressed Portugal for payment of American claims dating as far back as the War of 1812 and had refused offers of arbitration, but Fillmore gained a favorable settlement.

Fillmore had difficulties regarding the Spanish colony of Cuba since many Southerners hoped to see the island as an American slave territory. The Venezuelan adventurer Narciso López recruited Americans for three filibustering expeditions to Cuba in the hope of overthrowing Spanish rule. After the second attempt in 1850, López and some of his followers were indicted for breach of the Neutrality Act but were quickly acquitted by friendly Southern juries. The final López expedition ended with his execution by the Spanish, who put several Americans before the firing squad, including the nephew of Attorney General Crittenden. That resulted in riots against the Spanish in New Orleans, which caused their consul to flee. The historian Elbert B. Smith, who wrote of the Taylor and the Fillmore presidencies, suggested that Fillmore could have had war against Spain had he wanted. Instead, Fillmore, Webster, and the Spanish worked out a series of face-saving measures that settled the crisis without armed conflict. Many Southerners, including Whigs, supported the filibusters, and Fillmore's response helped to divide his party as the 1852 election approached.

A much-publicized event of the Fillmore presidency was the late 1851 arrival of Lajos Kossuth, the exiled leader of a failed Hungarian revolution. Kossuth wanted the United States to recognize Hungary's independence. Many Americans were sympathetic to the Hungarian rebels, especially recent German immigrants, who were now coming in large numbers and had become a major political force. Kossuth was feted by Congress, and Fillmore allowed a White House meeting after he had received word that Kossuth would not try to politicize it. Despite his promise, Kossuth made a speech promoting his cause. The American enthusiasm for Kossuth petered out, and he departed for Europe. Fillmore refused to change the American policy of remaining neutral.

=== Election of 1852 and completion of term ===
As the presidential election of 1852 approached, Fillmore remained undecided on whether to run for a full term as president. Secretary Webster had long coveted the presidency and was past 70 but planned a final attempt to gain the White House. Fillmore, sympathetic to the ambitions of his longtime friend, issued a letter in late 1851 stating that he did not seek a full term, but Fillmore was reluctant to rule it out for fear the party would be captured by the Sewardites. Thus, approaching the national convention in Baltimore, to be held in June 1852, the major candidates were Fillmore, Webster, and General Scott. Weed and Seward backed Scott. In late May, the Democrats nominated former New Hampshire senator Franklin Pierce, who had been out of federal politics for nearly a decade but whose profile had risen since his military service during the Mexican War. His nomination as a Northerner sympathetic to the southern view on slavery united the Democrats and meant that the Whig candidate would face an uphill battle.

Fillmore had become unpopular with northern Whigs for signing and enforcing the Fugitive Slave Act but still had considerable support from the South, where he was seen as the only candidate capable of uniting the party. Once the convention passed a party platform endorsing the Compromise as a final settlement of the slavery question, Fillmore was willing to withdraw. He found that many of his supporters could not accept Webster and that his action would nominate Scott. The convention was deadlocked until Saturday, June 19, when a total of 46 ballots had been taken, and the delegates adjourned until Monday. Party leaders proposed a deal to Fillmore and Webster: if the latter could increase his vote total over the next several ballots, enough Fillmore supporters would go along to put him over the top. Otherwise, Webster would withdraw in favor of Fillmore. The President quickly agreed, but Webster did not do so until Monday morning. On the 48th ballot, Webster delegates began defecting to Scott, and the general gained the nomination on the 53rd ballot. Webster was far more unhappy at the outcome than was Fillmore, who refused the secretary's resignation. Without the votes of much of the South and also of Northerners who depended on peaceful intersectional trade, Scott was easily beaten by Pierce in November. Smith suggested that the Whigs might have done much better with Fillmore.

The final months of Fillmore's term were uneventful. Webster died in October 1852, but during his final illness, Fillmore effectively acted as his own Secretary of State without incident, and Everett stepped competently into Webster's shoes. Fillmore intended to lecture Congress on slavery in his final annual message in December but was talked out of it by his cabinet. He contented himself with pointing out the prosperity of the nation and expressing gratitude for the opportunity to serve. There was little discussion of slavery during the lame-duck session of Congress. Fillmore left office on March 4, 1853, succeeded by Pierce.

== Post-presidency (1853–1874) ==
=== Personal tragedies ===
Fillmore was the first president to return to private life without independent wealth or possession of a landed estate. With no pension to anticipate, he needed to earn a living and felt that it should be in a way that would uphold the dignity of his former office. His friend Judge Hall assured him it would be proper for him to practice law in the higher courts of New York, and Fillmore so intended. The Fillmores had planned a tour of the South after they had left the White House, but Abigail caught a cold at President Pierce's inauguration, developed pneumonia, and died in Washington on March 30, 1853. A saddened Fillmore returned to Buffalo for the burial. The fact that he was in mourning limited his social activities, and he made ends meet on the income from his investments. He was bereaved again on July 26, 1854, when his only daughter, Mary, died of cholera.

=== Subsequent political activity ===
The former president ended his seclusion in early 1854, as a debate over Senator Douglas's Kansas–Nebraska Bill embroiled the nation. The bill would open the northern portion of the Louisiana Purchase to settlement and end the northern limit on slavery under the Missouri Compromise of 1820. Fillmore retained many supporters, planned an ostensibly nonpolitical national tour, and privately rallied disaffected Whig politicians to preserve the Union and to back him in a run for president. Fillmore made public appearances opening railroads and visiting the grave of Senator Clay but met with politicians outside the public eye during the late winter and spring of 1854.

Such a comeback could not be under the auspices of the Whig Party, with its remnants divided by the Kansas–Nebraska legislation, which passed with the support of Pierce. Many northern foes of slavery, such as Seward, gravitated toward the new Republican Party, but Fillmore saw no home for himself there. In the early 1850s, there was considerable hostility toward immigrants, especially Catholics, who had recently arrived in the US in large numbers, and several nativist organizations, including the Order of the Star Spangled Banner, sprang up in reaction. By 1854 the order had morphed into the American Party, which became known as the Know Nothings. In its early days, members were sworn to keep its internal deliberations private and, if asked, were to say they knew nothing about them.

Many from Fillmore's "National Whig" faction had joined the Know Nothings by 1854 and influenced the organization to take up causes besides nativism. Fillmore was encouraged by the success of the Know Nothings in the 1854 midterm elections in which they won in several states of the Northeast and showed strength in the South. On January 1, 1855, he sent a letter for publication that warned against immigrant influence in American elections, and he soon joined the order.

Later that year Fillmore went abroad, and stated publicly that as he lacked office he might as well travel. The trip was at the advice of political friends, who felt that by touring he would avoid involvement in the contentious issues of the day. He spent March 1855 to June 1856 in Europe and the Middle East. Queen Victoria is said to have pronounced the ex-president the handsomest man she had ever seen, and his coincidental appearance with Van Buren in the gallery of the House of Commons provoked a comment from the MP John Bright.

Dorothea Dix had preceded him to Europe and was lobbying to improve conditions for the mentally ill. They continued to correspond and met several times. In Rome, Fillmore had an audience with Pope Pius IX. He carefully weighed the political pros and cons of meeting with Pius. He nearly withdrew from the meeting when he was told that he would have to kneel and kiss the Pope's hand. To avoid that, Pius remained seated throughout the meeting.

=== 1856 campaign ===
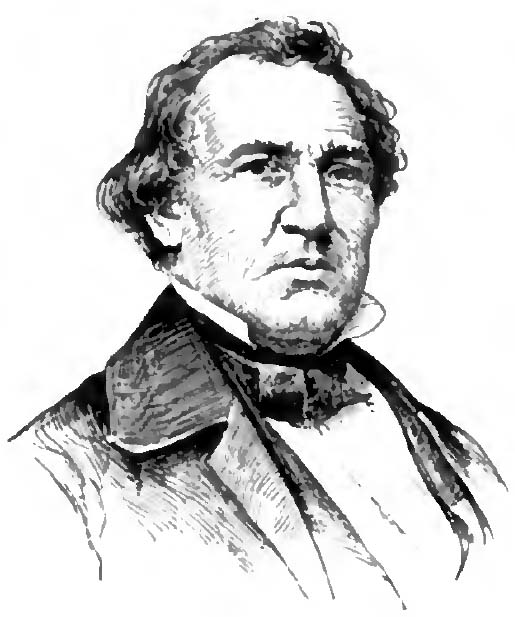
Andrew Donelson

Fillmore's allies were in full control of the American Party and arranged for him to get its presidential nomination while he was in Europe. The Know Nothing convention chose Fillmore's running mate: Andrew Donelson of Kentucky, the nephew by marriage and once-ward of President Jackson. Fillmore made a celebrated return in June 1856 by speaking at a series of welcomes, beginning with his arrival at a huge reception in New York City and continuing across the state to Buffalo. The addresses were portrayed as expressions of thanks for his reception, rather than as campaign speeches, which might be considered illicit office-seeking if they were made by a presidential hopeful. Fillmore warned that electing the Republican candidate, former California senator John C. Frémont, who had no support in the South, would lead to civil war. Both Fillmore and the Democratic candidate, former Pennsylvania senator James Buchanan, agreed that slavery was principally a matter for the states, not the federal government. Fillmore rarely spoke about the immigration question, focused on the sectional divide, and urged the preservation of the Union.

Fillmore won only Maryland (pink).

Once Fillmore was back home in Buffalo, he had no excuse to make speeches, and his campaign stagnated through the summer and fall of 1856. Political fixers who had been Whigs, such as Weed, tended to join the Republican Party, and the Know Nothings lacked experience at selling anything but nativism. Accordingly, Fillmore's pro-Union stance mostly went unheard. Although the South was friendly towards Fillmore, many people feared that a Frémont victory would lead to secession, and some of those who were sympathetic to Fillmore moved into the Buchanan camp for fear of splitting the anti-Frémont vote. Scarry suggested that the events of 1856, including the conflict in Kansas Territory and the caning of Charles Sumner on the Senate floor, polarized the nation and made Fillmore's moderate stance obsolete.

Buchanan won with 1,836,072 votes (45.3%) and 174 electoral votes to Frémont's 1,342,345 votes (33.1%) and 114 electoral votes. Fillmore and Donelson finished third by winning 873,053 votes (21.6%) and carrying the state of Maryland and its eight electoral votes. (Note: Fillmore thus became the first former president to receive electoral votes, a distinction that later also included Grover Cleveland (1892), Theodore Roosevelt (1912), and Donald Trump (2024).) The American Party ticket narrowly lost in several southern states: a change of fewer than 8,000 votes in Louisiana, Kentucky, and Tennessee would have thrown the election to the House of Representatives, where the sectional divide would have made the outcome uncertain.

The historian Allan Nevins wrote that Fillmore was not a Know Nothing or a nativist, offering as support that Fillmore was out of the country when the nomination came and had not been consulted about running. Nevins wrote of Fillmore, "by no spoken or written word had he indicated a subscription to American tenets." But Fillmore's 1855 letter explicitly denounces immigrant influence in elections, and Fillmore said the American Party was the "only hope of forming a truly national party, which shall ignore this constant and distracting agitation of slavery."

=== Remarriage, later life, and death ===
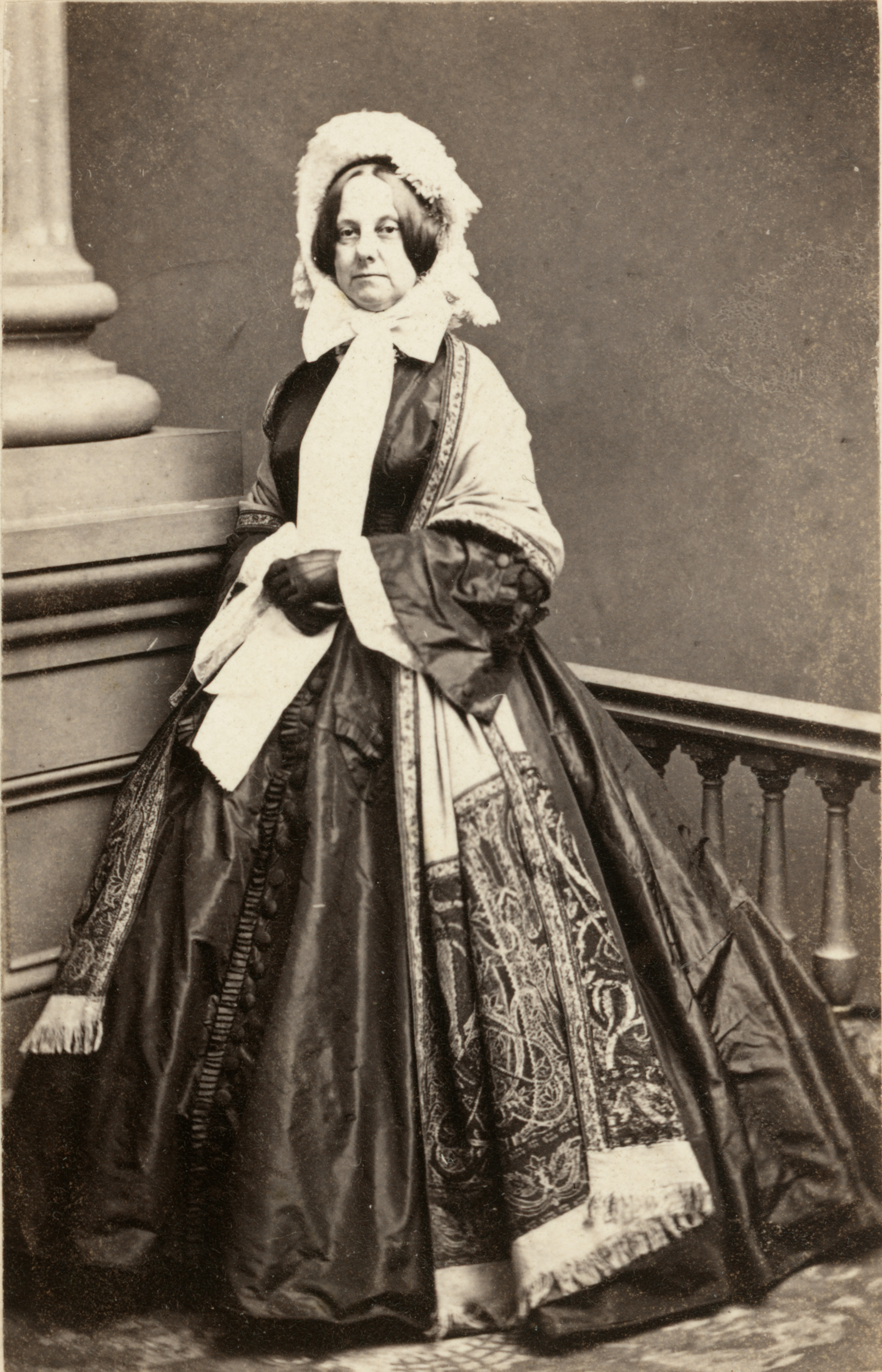
Caroline Fillmore c. 1865

Fillmore considered his political career to have ended with his defeat in 1856. He again felt inhibited from returning to the practice of law. His financial worries ended, though, on February 10, 1858, when he married Caroline McIntosh, a well-to-do widow. Their combined wealth allowed them to purchase a large house on Niagara Square in Buffalo, where they lived for the remainder of his life. There, the Fillmores devoted themselves to entertaining and philanthropy. According to the historian Smith, "They generously supported almost every conceivable cause." Among these were the Buffalo General Hospital, which he helped found.

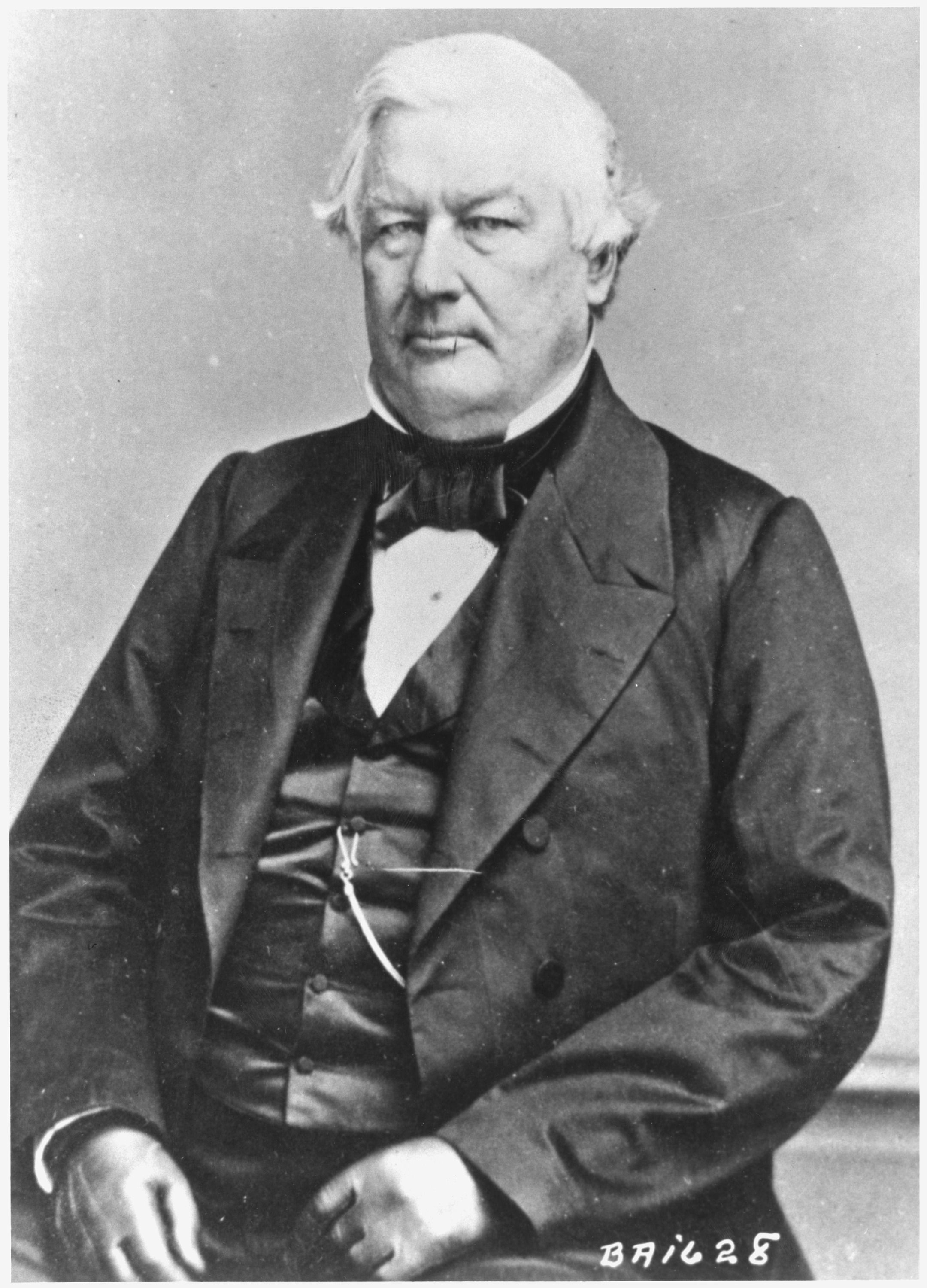
Fillmore during the Civil War

In the 1860 presidential election Fillmore voted for Senator Douglas, one of the Democratic nominees. After the vote, in which the Republican nominee, former Illinois Representative Abraham Lincoln, was elected, many sought out Fillmore's views, but he refused to take part in the secession crisis that followed, feeling that he lacked influence. He decried Buchanan's inaction as states left the Union and wrote that although the federal government could not coerce a state, those advocating secession should be regarded as traitors. When Lincoln came to Buffalo en route to his inauguration, Fillmore led the committee selected to receive him, hosted him at his mansion, and took him to church. Once the Civil War began, Fillmore supported Lincoln's efforts to preserve the Union. He commanded the Union Continentals, a corps of home guards of men over 45 from upstate New York. The Continentals trained to defend the Buffalo area in the event of a Confederate attack from Canada. They performed military drills and ceremonial functions at parades, funerals, and other events. The Union Continentals guarded Lincoln's funeral train in Buffalo. They continued operations after the war, and Fillmore remained active with them almost until his death.

Despite Fillmore's zeal in the war effort, he gave a speech in early 1864 calling for magnanimity toward the South after the war and counted its heavy cost in finances and in blood. The Lincoln administration saw the speech as an attack on it that could not be tolerated in an election year. Fillmore was criticized in many newspapers and called a Copperhead and even a traitor. That led to lasting ill-feeling against Fillmore in many circles.

In the 1864 presidential election, Fillmore supported the Democratic nominee, George B. McClellan, since he believed that the Democratic Party's plan for immediate cessation of fighting and allowing the seceded states to return with slavery intact was the best chance to restore the Union. After the assassination of Abraham Lincoln in April 1865, black ink was thrown on Fillmore's house because it was not draped in mourning like others. Fillmore was apparently out of town at the time and put black drapes in the windows once he returned. He retained his position as Buffalo's leading citizen and was among those selected to escort the body when Lincoln's funeral train passed through Buffalo, but many remained angry at him for his wartime positions. Fillmore supported President Andrew Johnson's Reconstruction policies since he felt that the nation needed to be reconciled as quickly as possible. He devoted most of his time to civic activities. He aided Buffalo in becoming the third American city to have a permanent art gallery, the Buffalo Fine Arts Academy.

Fillmore stayed in good health almost to the end of his life. He had a stroke in February 1874, and died on March 8, at age 74, after a second stroke. Two days later, he was buried at Forest Lawn Cemetery in Buffalo after a funeral procession including hundreds.

== Legacy and historical view ==
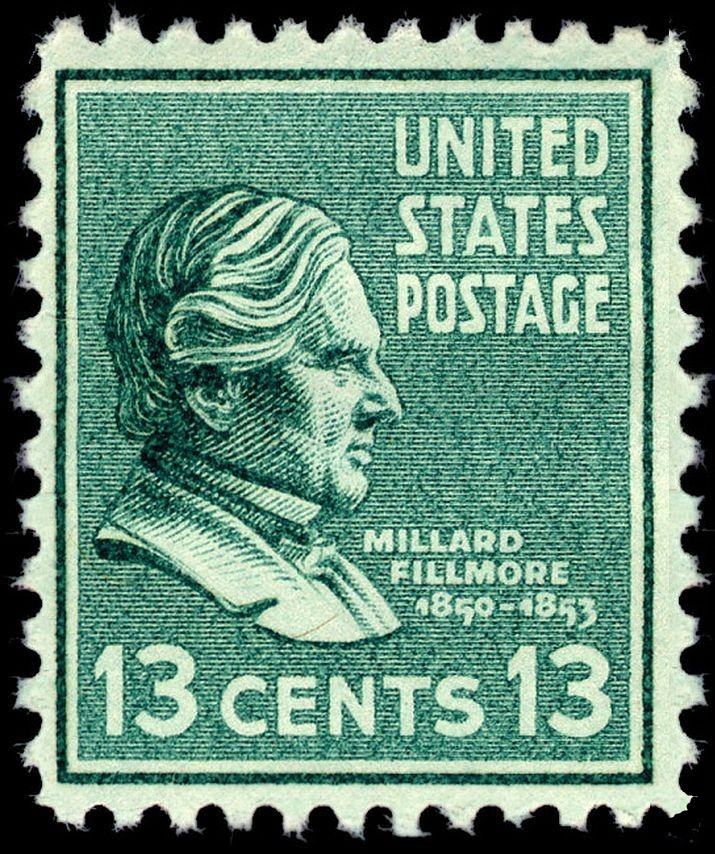
Fillmore Presidential Issue, released September 22, 1938

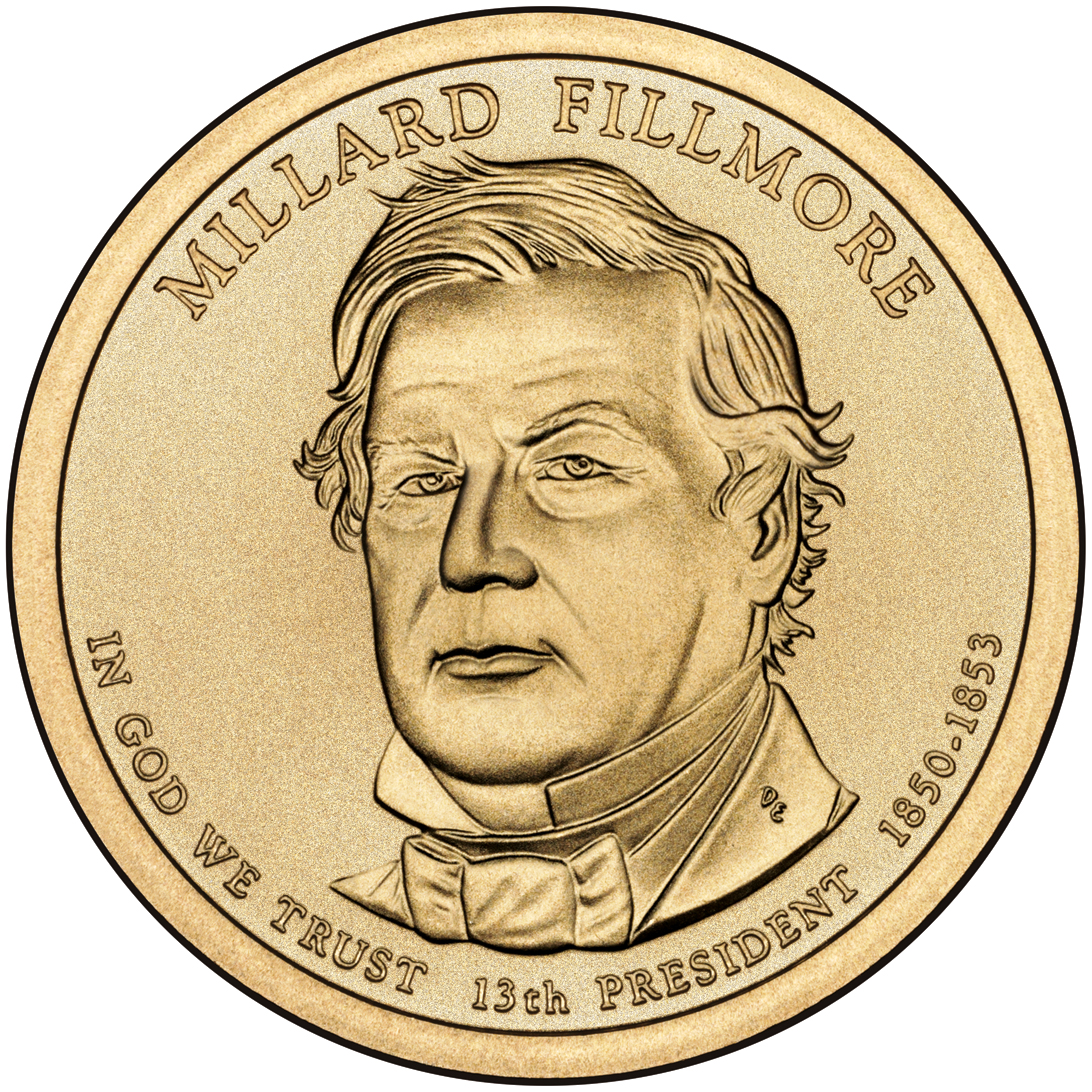
2010 Presidential dollar

Fillmore is ranked by historians and political scientists as one of the worst U.S. presidents. His handling of major political issues, such as slavery, has led many historians to describe him as weak and inept. According to biographer Scarry: "No president of the United States ... has suffered as much ridicule as Millard Fillmore." Scarry ascribes much of the abuse to a tendency to denigrate the presidents who served just before the Civil War as lacking in leadership. For example, President Harry S. Truman later "characterized Fillmore as a weak, trivial thumb-twaddler who would do nothing to offend anyone" and as partially responsible for the war.

Fillmore's name has become a byword in popular culture for easily forgotten and inconsequential presidents. In 2010, Anna Prior wrote in The Wall Street Journal that Fillmore's very name connotes mediocrity. Finkelman, another Fillmore biographer, comments, "on the central issues of the age his vision was myopic and his legacy is worse ... in the end, Fillmore was always on the wrong side of the great moral and political issues." But Rayback applauds "the warmth and wisdom with which he had defended the Union", and Smith finds Fillmore "a conscientious president" who honored his oath of office by enforcing the 1850 Fugitive Slave Act rather than govern based on his personal preferences. Steven G. Calabresi and Christopher S. Yoo, in their study of presidential power, deem Fillmore "a faithful executor of the laws of the United States – for good and for ill". But according to Smith, the enforcement of the Act has given Fillmore an undeserved pro-southern reputation. Fillmore's place in history has also suffered because "even those who give him high marks for his support of the compromise have done so almost grudgingly, probably because of his Know-Nothing candidacy in 1856." Smith argues that Fillmore's association with the Know Nothings looks far worse in retrospect and that Fillmore was not motivated by nativism, despite his 1855 letter that stoked fear about immigrant influence in elections.

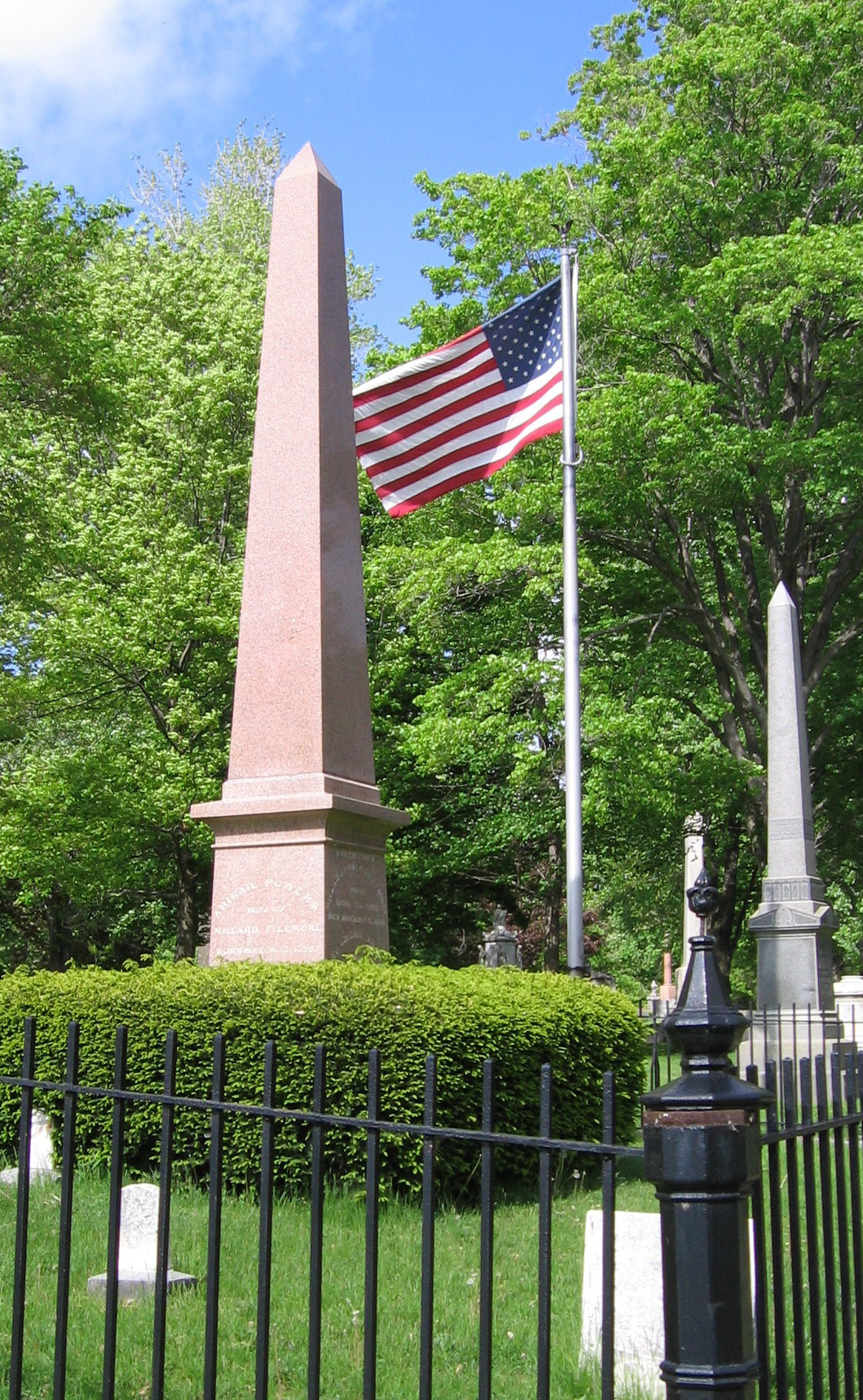
A pink obelisk marks Fillmore's grave at Buffalo's Forest Lawn Cemetery.

Benson Lee Grayson suggests that the Fillmore administration's ability to avoid potential problems is too often overlooked. Fillmore's constant attention to Mexico avoided a resumption of the Mexican–American War and laid the groundwork for the Gadsden Treaty. The Fillmore administration also resolved a controversy with Portugal left over from the Taylor administration, smoothed over a disagreement with Peru over guano islands, and peacefully resolved disputes with Britain, France, and Spain over Cuba, all without the US going to war or losing face. Grayson also applauds Fillmore's firm stand against Texas's ambitions in New Mexico during the 1850 crisis. Fred I. Greenstein and Dale Anderson praise Fillmore for his resolve in his early months in office and note that Fillmore "is typically described as stolid, bland, and conventional, but such terms underestimate the forcefulness evinced by his handling of the Texas-New Mexico border crisis, his decision to replace Taylor's entire cabinet, and his effectiveness in advancing the Compromise of 1850." Political scientist James E. Campbell defends Fillmore's legacy, writing, "Historians have underrated him, his detractors have unfairly maligned him, and the institutions he honorably served have disrespected him". Campbell argues that the Compromise of 1850 "did more good than harm for the nation and the anti-slavery cause".

Fillmore and his wife, Abigail, established the first White House library. His East Aurora house still stands, and sites honor him at his birthplace and boyhood home, where the Millard Fillmore Memorial Association dedicated a replica log cabin in 1963. A statue of Fillmore stands outside Buffalo City Hall. On February 18, 2010, the United States Mint released the 13th coin in the Presidential $1 Coin Program, bearing Fillmore's likeness.

According to the Miller Center of Public Affairs at the University of Virginia:

Any assessment of a President who served a century and a half ago must be refracted through a consideration of the interesting times in which he lived. Fillmore's political career encompassed the tortuous course toward the two-party system that we know today. The Whigs were not cohesive enough to survive the slavery imbroglio, while parties like the Anti-Masonics and Know-Nothings were too extremist. When, as President, Fillmore sided with proslavery elements in ordering enforcement of the Fugitive Slave Law, he all but guaranteed that he would be the last Whig President. The first modern two-party system of Whigs and Democrats had succeeded only in dividing the nation in two by the 1850s, and seven years later, the election of the first Republican President, Abraham Lincoln, would guarantee civil war.

== See also ==
- Fillmore Street, San Francisco, named for Millard Fillmore
- List of presidents of the United States
- List of presidents of the United States by previous experience
- List of vice presidents of the United States
- Presidents of the United States on U.S. postage stamps

== Sources ==
- Anbinder, Tyler (February 2000). "Fillmore, Millard". American National Biography Online.
- Brinkley, Alan; Dyer, Davis (2004). The American Presidency. New York: Houghton Mifflin. ISBN 978-0-6183-8273-6 – via Google Books.
- Calabresi, Steven G.; Yoo, Christopher S. (2008). The Unitary Executive: Presidential Power from Washington to Bush. Yale University Press. ISBN 978-0-300-12126-1.
- Finkelman, Paul (2011). Millard Fillmore. The American Presidents. Times Books. ISBN 978-0-8050-8715-4.
- Grayson, Benson Lee (1981). The Unknown President: The Administration of Millard Fillmore. University Press of America. ISBN 978-0-8191-1457-0.
- Greenstein, Fred I.; Anderson, Dale (2013). Presidents and the Dissolution of the Union: Leadership Style from Polk to Lincoln. Princeton University Press. ISBN 978-1-4008-4641-2.
- Holt, Michael F. (2003). The Rise and Fall of the American Whig Party. New York: Oxford University Press. ISBN 978-0-1951-6104-5 – via Google Books.
- Rayback, Robert J. (2015) [1959]. Millard Fillmore: Biography of a President (Kindle ed.). Pickle Partners Publishing., a major scholarly biography
- Scarry, Robert J. (2001). Millard Fillmore (Kindle ed.). McFarland & Co., Inc. ISBN 978-1-4766-1398-7.
- Smith, Elbert B. (1988). The Presidencies of Zachary Taylor & Millard Fillmore. The American Presidency. University Press of Kansas. ISBN 978-0-7006-0362-6.
- Snyder, Charles M. (1975). The Lady and the President: The Letters of Dorothea Dix and Millard Fillmore. University Press of Kentucky. ISBN 978-0-8131-1332-6.

U.S. House of Representatives
New constituency	Member of the U.S. House of Representatives from New York's 32nd congressional district 1833–1835	Succeeded by Thomas C. Love
Preceded by Thomas C. Love	Member of the U.S. House of Representatives from New York's 32nd congressional district 1837–1843	Succeeded by William A. Moseley
Preceded by John Winston Jones	Chair of the House Ways and Means Committee; 1841–1843	Succeeded by James Iver McKay
Party political offices
Preceded by Luther Bradish	Whig nominee for Governor of New York; 1844	Succeeded by John Young
Preceded by Theodore Frelinghuysen	Whig nominee for Vice President of the United States; 1848	Succeeded by William Alexander Graham
Preceded by Winfield Scott	Whig nominee for President of the United States; 1856	Succeeded by John Bell; Constitutional Union
Preceded by Jacob Broom	Know Nothing nominee for President of the United States; 1856	Party dissolved
Political offices
Preceded by Azariah Cutting Flagg	Comptroller of New York; 1848–1849	Succeeded by Washington Hunt
Preceded by George M. Dallas	Vice President of the United States; 1849–1850	Succeeded by William R. King
Preceded by Zachary Taylor	President of the United States; 1850–1853	Succeeded by Franklin Pierce
