= 1844 New York state election =

1844 New York state elections
- November 5, 1844

The 1844 New York state elections was held on November 5, 1844, to elect the Governor, the Lieutenant Governor and four Canal Commissioners, as well as all members of the New York State Assembly and eight members of the New York State Senate.

== History ==
The Act of May 6, 1844, which re-organized the Canal Department, required the Canal Commissioners to be elected by general ballot.

== Results ==
The Democrats won all six state offices.

1844 state election results
Office	Democratic ticket		Whig ticket		Liberty ticket	
Governor	Silas Wright	241,090	Millard Fillmore	231,057	Alvan Stewart	15,136
Lieutenant Governor	Addison Gardiner	240,844	Samuel J. Wilkin	231,048	Charles O. Shepard	15,386
Canal Commissioners	Jonas Earll, Jr.		Samuel Works			
	Nathaniel Jones		Spencer Kellogg			
	Daniel P. Bissell		Elijah Rhoades			
	Stephen Clark		Joseph H. Jackson			

67 Democrats, 45 Whigs and 16 American Republicans were elected to the Assembly session of 1845. 6 Democrats, 1 Whig and 1 American Republican were elected to the Senate. Thus the Senate of the 68th New York State Legislature consisted of 27 Democrats, 4 Whigs and 1 American Republican.

== Sources ==
- History of Political Parties in the State of New-York by John Stilwell Jenkins (Alden & Markham, Auburn NY, 1846; page 466)
- Result in Manual of the Corporation of the City of New York (1852; page 367)

== See also ==
- New York gubernatorial elections
- New York state elections
