= Daniel P. Bissell =

American physician

Daniel Perez Bissell (May 27, 1802 in Randolph, Orange County, Vermont – October 28, 1874 in Utica, Oneida County, New York) was an American medical doctor and politician from New York.

== Life ==
He lived in Moscow, Livingston County, New York.

In 1842, he was elected by the New York State Legislature one of the canal commissioners. In November 1844, he was re-elected at the first statewide election of canal commissioners, and remained in office until the end of 1847 when he was legislated out of office by the New York State Constitution of 1846.

In 1863, he was elected President of the Medical Society of the State of New York.

== Sources ==
- "The State Medical Society", in NYT on February 6, 1863
- The New York Civil List compiled by Franklin Benjamin Hough (page 42; Weed, Parsons and Co., 1858)
