= Union Continentals =

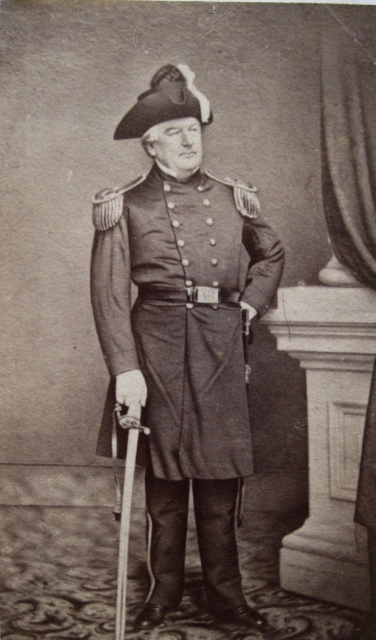
- Major Millard Fillmore of the Union Continentals, 1862
- Active: 27 April 1861 - 1870s
- Allegiance: United States of America
- Branch: New York Militia
- Type: Volunteer Militia
- Size: Regiment
- Engagements: American Civil War: Defence of Buffalo

Commanders
- Notable commanders: Millard Fillmore

The Union Continentals was a volunteer infantry company of the New York Militia that served to defend Buffalo, New York during the American Civil War. The regiment served on guard duty throughout Buffalo and the surrounding area from 1861 until 1865, protecting the city from possible Confederate raids. The regiment guarded President Lincoln when his body lay in state in the city in April 1865.

Former president Millard Fillmore served as the commanding officer of the unit from April 1861 until his death in 1874.

== Background ==
With the firing on Fort Sumter and the outbreak of the Civil War, many volunteers flocked to join the Union Army, and many northern cities organized companies of volunteers for service. Buffalo was inundated with patriotism, the regular U.S. soldiers on duty at Fort Porter were placed on alert and the local militia awaited orders to march. One of the local volunteer units was the Buffalo City Guards, a company raised during the Patriot War of 1837.

== Service ==
On April 27, 1861, a home guard composed of retired militia officers and soldiers was organized under the command of Major Millard Fillmore, the former president having served in the New York Militia for many years. The company would by styled as the Union Continentals, honoring the soldiers who had fought for liberty and freedom during the American Revolution.

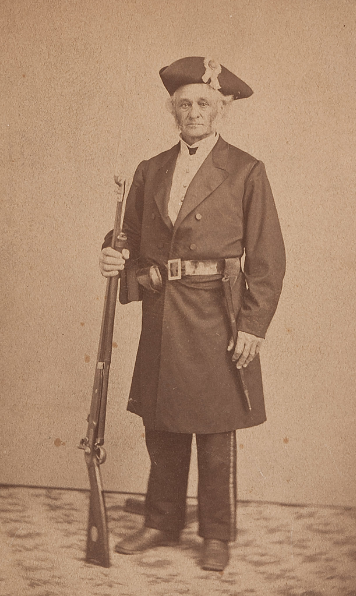
Private Noyes Darrow of the Union Continentals

The uniform of the soldiers consisted of a "black frock coat, black cravat or stock, buff military vest, white cotton gloves, black pantaloons, and a continental cocked hat with union cockade". Officers wore an "entire blue navy uniform" with epaulettes, sash, and sword. The Chaplain and Major Fillmore wore double-breasted frock coats while "Captains and Lieutenants wore single-breasted".

The men of the Continentals sought to link themselves to the past military history of Buffalo, drilling at Kremlin Hall - so named because it had "risen from Britain's torch like Moscow from Napoleon's". Some members of the regiment had served during the War of 1812, such as Privates Jonathan Mayhew and Lucius Storrs.

On May 21, the Buffalo Commercial Advertiser reported that within the 150 men of the Union Continentals, there were "4 ex-generals of militia, 16 ex-colonels, 33 ex-majors, 60 ex-captains, and 35 honorary members."

The Continentals met two evenings a week to drill at Kremlin Hall, and full uniforms were not required for weekly drill, only hats and gloves. The regiment completed organization in May 1861, with Fillmore as Major, John C. Lord as Chaplain, one captain, three lieutenants, one quartermaster, five sergeants, and four corporals.

A $3 initiation fee to join the regiment was introduced and the men would be fined for unexplained absences from the drill nights:

- Commissioned Officers - $0.50
- Non-commissioned Officers - $0.25
- Privates - $0.10

On May 3, 1861, Major Fillmore and the regiment escorted four companies of the 21st New York Infantry Regiment to the Exchange Street station for their departure to Elmira. A further six companies of the 21st New York were accompanied on May 11. On the 17th, the regiment escorted Captain Elihu Faxon's Buffalo company of the 36th New York Infantry Regiment to the same station.

On July 4, 1861, the men of the Continentals assembled at Chaplain Lord's church for a July 4 Parade, receiving their regimental color - a silk banner made by two dozen women who called themselves the Ladies Resident in Buffalo in 1812. The wife of Continental Oliver Steele presented the flag to Major Fillmore.

The Continentals participated in the March 1862 military funeral of Naval Lieutenant Thomas A. Budd, and the March 1863 funeral of Colonel John McMahon of the 164th New York Infantry Regiment. The men turned out at the train station to salute the New England troops returning from Banks' Port Hudson campaign in 1863.

Along with the two other local militia regiments, the Buffalo Tigers and the Buffalo Light Guards, they stood guard at the State Arsenal from 1862 until Special Order No. 6 of Brigadier General Henry Livingstone Lansing, commanding the 31st Brigade of the New York National Guard, relieved the three militia groups of that duty in July 1863.

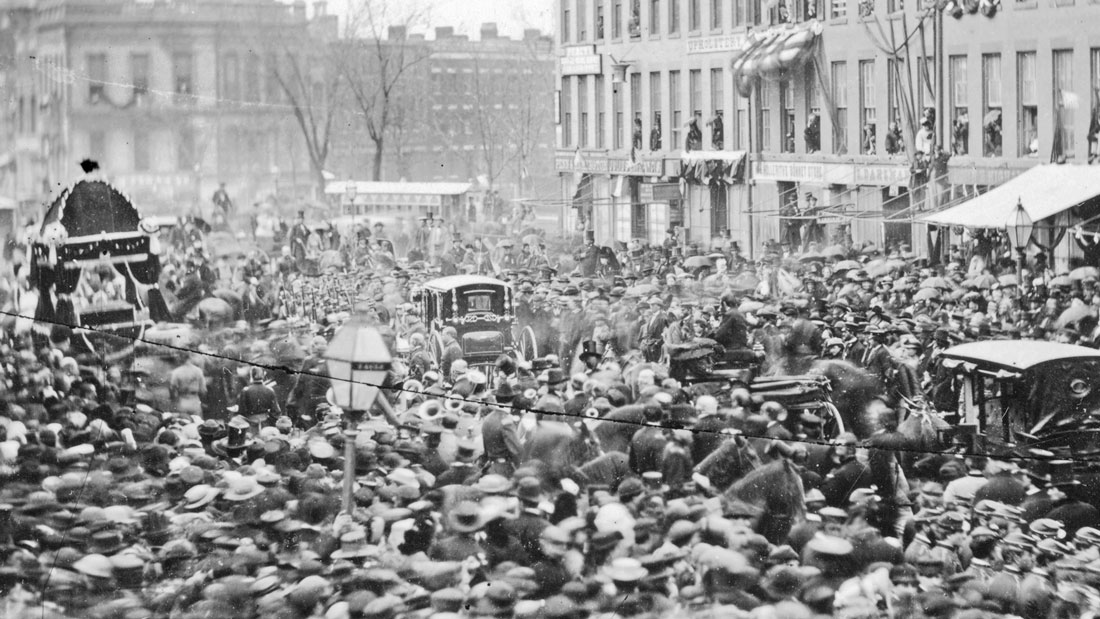
Main Street Buffalo, NY during the funeral procession of Abraham Lincoln

When the body of Abraham Lincoln was laid in state at Buffalo's Saint James Hall on April 27, 1865, the regiment served as the guard of honor.

== Post War ==
With the return of Erie County soldiers in 1865 and 1866, the regiment was stood down as an active guard unit, serving in a ceremonial capacity for years afterwards. Major Fillmore commanded the regiment until his death in 1874.
