= Jo Jackson =

Jo Jackson may refer to:

- Joanne Jackson (swimmer) (born 1986), English swimmer and Olympic medallist for Great Britain
- Johanna Jackson (born 1985), British racewalking athlete

== See also ==
- Joe Jackson (disambiguation)
