= Christopher S. Yoo =

American legal scholar

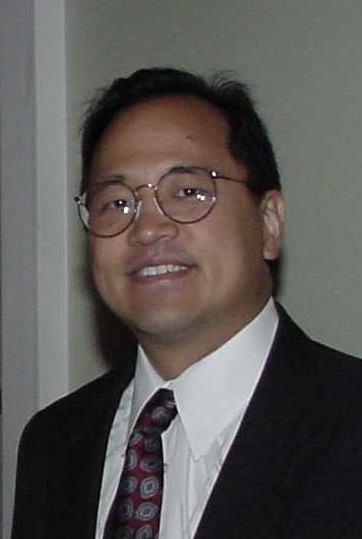
- Education: Harvard University (BA); University of California, Los Angeles (MBA); Northwestern University (JD)
- Occupations: Professor, University of Pennsylvania Law School

Christopher S. Yoo is the John H. Chestnut Professor of Law, Communication, and Computer and Information Science at the University of Pennsylvania Law School, and the founding director of the Center for Technology, Innovation, and Competition. He is well known for his work on technology law, media law and copyright, and is among the most frequently cited authors in that domain. He is best known for being among the first academics to engage in the debate over network neutrality. He has taken a middle ground between a more restrictive and more permissive approach, animated by the belief that innovation needs room for experimentation if it is to thrive. He characterizes his position as network "diversity," which argues that the technology and economic environment surrounding the Internet requires greater flexibility, with the difficult question being how much flexibility is too much. He has also studied the history of the unitary executive in the United States.

== Education and early career ==
Christopher Yoo graduated cum laude from Harvard University where he was a National Merit Scholar. He completed a Master of Business Administration at the Anderson School of Management at UCLA in 1991, where he was awarded the Sigoloff Fellowship and served as the President of the Asian Management Students Association. He graduated from Northwestern University School of Law magna cum laude in 1995, where he was John Paul Stevens Prize for graduating first, and the Lowden-Wigmore Prize for best law review note in the Northwestern University Law Review.

Following his graduation he clerked for Judge Arthur Raymond Randolph of the United States Court of Appeals and for Supreme Court justice Anthony Kennedy. He practiced law with Hogan & Hartson in Washington DC, serving on the appellate group led by John Roberts.

Additionally, he has worked as a U.S. history teacher at an international high school in Seoul, South Korea, a legislative assistant for a U.S. Senator, and as part of the marketing division for Procter & Gamble.

== Academic career ==
From 1999 to 2007, Yoo was a professor at Vanderbilt University Law School. From 2005 to 2007, he directed Vanderbilt's Technology and Entertainment Law Program.

During the 2006-07 academic year, he was a visiting professor at the University of Pennsylvania Law School. He accepted an appointment as a full professor of law in 2007. He also holds secondary appointments at Annenberg School of Communication and The Department of Computer and Information Science. He was named the University's John H. Chestnut Professor in 2011.

== See also ==
- List of law clerks for the first seat of the Supreme Court of the United States
