= Joseph H. Jackson (politician) =

American lawyer and politician (1787–1856)

Member of the New York State Assembly
- In office January 1, 1843 – December 31, 1843
- Preceded by: Thomas R. Powell
- Succeeded by: Francis D. Flanders

Personal details
- Born: Joseph Hall Jackson; June 11, 1787 New Durham, New Hampshire, U.S.
- Died: January 7, 1856 (aged 68) Malone, New York, U.S.
- Party: Whig
- Spouse: Elizabeth Gillette (m. 1829)
- Children: 1
- Occupation: Politician, attorney

Joseph Hall Jackson (June 11, 1787 – January 7, 1856) was an American lawyer and politician from New York.

== Life ==
Jackson was born on June 11, 1787, in New Durham, New Hampshire. He attended Dartmouth College, graduating from there in 1807.

In 1808, Jackson taught in Danvers, Massachusetts. Shortly afterwards, he read law in New York City for three years. He was admitted to the bar in 1811 and initially practiced in Durham, New York. He later started practicing in Albany. In 1833, he moved to Malone.

In 1841, Jackson was appointed District Attorney of Franklin County. He served in the New York State Assembly in 1843. In the 1844 New York state election, he was the Whig Party candidate for Canal Commissioner.

For a time, Jackson worked as a newspaper editor and contributor for the Northern Spectator after its previous editor George P. Allen retired. In 1844, he formed a law partnership with A. B. Parmelee, which lasted for two years. He later created a law firm with John Hutton. The firm later included Albert Hobbs.

Jackson married Elizabeth Gillette in 1829. Their daughter, Elizabeth L., married Judge Horace A. Taylor. He was a vestryman in the local Episcopal Church.

Jackson died in Malone on January 7, 1856.

New York State Assembly
Preceded by Thomas R. Powell	New York State Assembly; Franklin County; 1843	Succeeded by Francis D. Flanders
