= Castleton station (Vermont) =

Train station in Castleton, Vermont, US

Castleton, VT
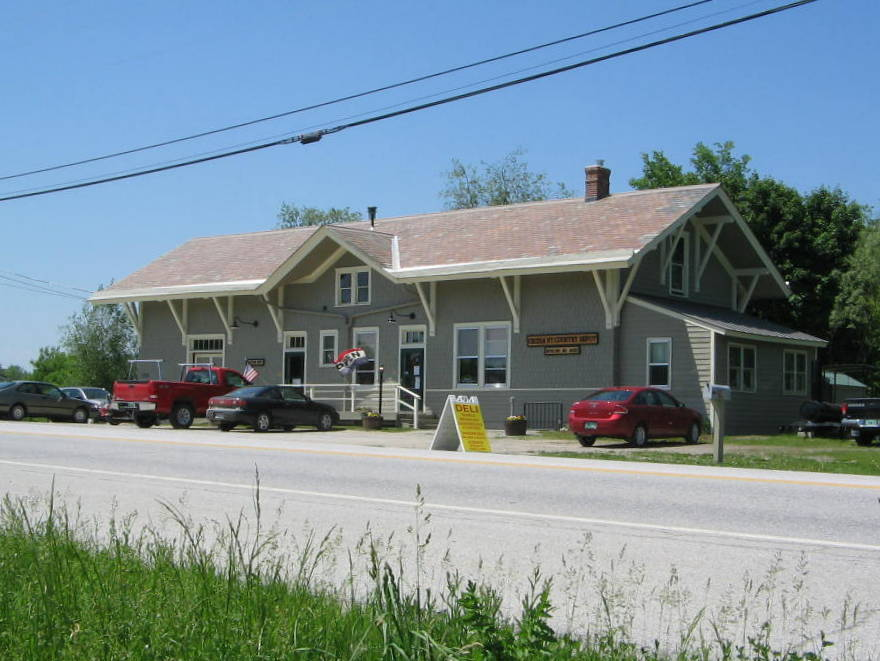
- Castleton station in 2010

General information
- Location: 266 Main Street; Castleton, Vermont; United States
- Coordinates: 43°36′48″N 73°10′17″W
- Owner: Castleton Depot, LLC
- Lines: VRS Clarendon and Pittsford Railroad
- Platforms: 1 side platform
- Tracks: 1
- Connections: The Bus: Fair Haven-Rutland Connector

Construction
- Parking: Yes
- Accessible: Yes

Other information
- Status: Unstaffed station with waiting room
- Station code: Amtrak: CNV

History
- Opened: 1850 (R&W); January 2, 2010 (Amtrak)
- Rebuilt: 2005–2009

Passengers
- FY 2025: 3,042 (Amtrak)

Services
| Preceding station | Amtrak | Following station |
|---|---|---|
| Rutland toward Burlington | Ethan Allen Express | Fort Edward toward New York |
Former services
| Preceding station | Delaware and Hudson Railway | Following station |
|---|---|---|
| West Rutland toward Rutland | Eagle Bridge – Rutland | Poultney toward Eagle Bridge |
| West Rutland toward Rutland | Whitehall – Rutland | Hydeville toward Whitehall |
Location

Castleton station is an Amtrak intercity train station in Castleton, Vermont. Originally built by the Rutland and Whitehall Railroad in 1850, the depot is now privately owned, and is located across from the northern terminus of the Delaware and Hudson Rail Trail. Castleton replaced Fair Haven station on the Ethan Allen Express in January 2010. It serves nearby Castleton University and Lake Bomoseen.

The station has one short low-level wooden side platform to the east of the track.

== History ==
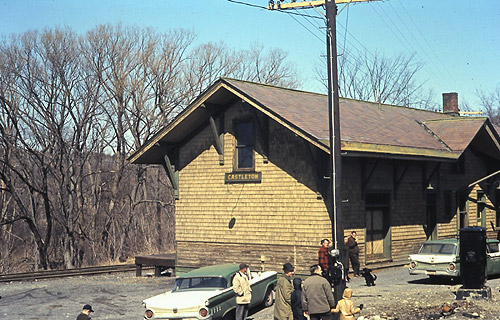
Castleton station in April 1964

The station building was constructed in 1850. Passenger service on the line between Whitehall and Rutland ended on June 24, 1934. In 1966, the Delaware and Hudson Railroad sold the station to the Jakubowski family.

The Ethan Allen Express began service between New York City and Rutland on December 2, 1996. An infill station was opened at Fair Haven in November 1997.

Fair Haven is a small town with limited tourist activity; in FY 2007 the station served just 2,205 passengers. In 2005, the Jakubowski family began renovating Castleton station. In January 2010, Fair Haven station was replaced with Castleton, 5 miles (8.0 km) to the east, which better serves Castleton University and Lake Bomoseen. Castleton station opened on January 2; Fair Haven remained in use until January 9.

Accessibility improvements at the station, including a new platform, took place in 2016–2018. From March 2020 to July 19, 2021, all Amtrak service in Vermont was suspended in response to the COVID-19 pandemic, with the Ethan Allen Express truncated to Albany–Rensselaer station.
