= Whitehall station =

Train station in Whitehall, New York, US

Whitehall, NY
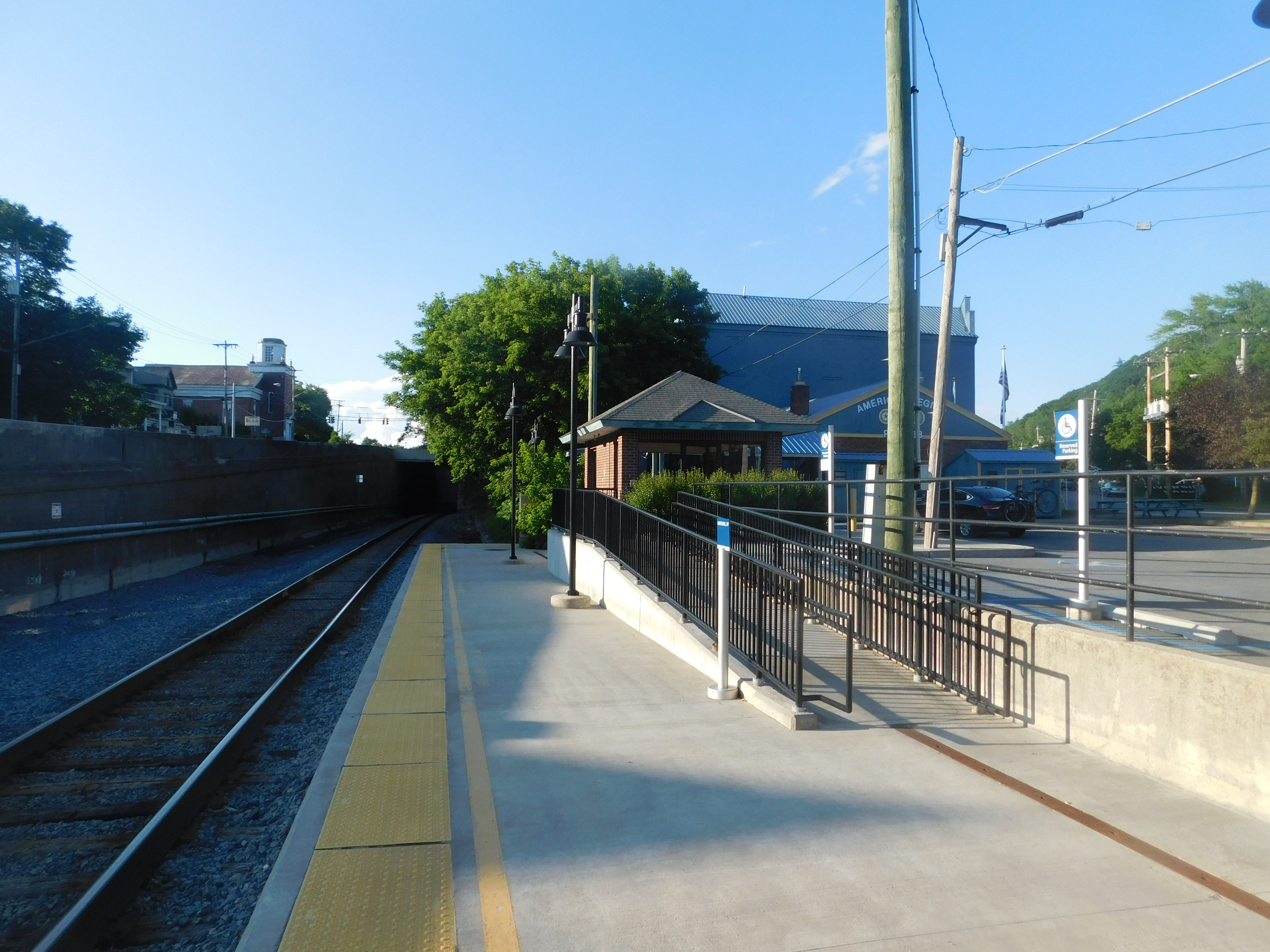
- Whitehall station in July 2017

General information
- Location: 154 Main Street; Whitehall, New York; United States
- Coordinates: 43.5558°N 73.4033°W
- Owner: Amtrak
- Line: Canadian Subdivision
- Platforms: 1 side platform
- Tracks: 1

Construction
- Accessible: Yes

Other information
- Station code: Amtrak: WHL

History
- Rebuilt: April–November 14, 1994; 2017

Key dates
- April 30, 1971: Delaware and Hudson Railroad service ends
- August 6, 1974: Amtrak service begins

Passengers
- FY 2025: 1,527 (Amtrak)

Services
Preceding station	Amtrak	Following station
Ticonderoga toward Montreal	Adirondack	Fort Edward toward New York
Former services
Preceding station	Delaware and Hudson Railway	Following station
Dresden toward Rouses Point	Main Line	Comstock toward Albany
Fair Haven toward Rutland	Whitehall – Rutland	Terminus
Location

Whitehall station is an Amtrak intercity train station in the village of Whitehall, New York. It is served by the Adirondack. It has one low-level side platform with a small shelter on the east side of the track.

== History ==
The Saratoga and Washington Railroad opened from Saratoga Springs, New York to Gansevoort on August 15, 1848, and on to Whitehall on December 10. The original terminus was just north of the village center at a dock on the Poultney River - the southern tip of Lake Champlain - thus establishing the railroad as a competitor to the Champlain Canal. A 1-mile (1.6 km) extension north to Lake Station on October 1, 1851 eliminated the need for ships to round a dangerous bend in the river.

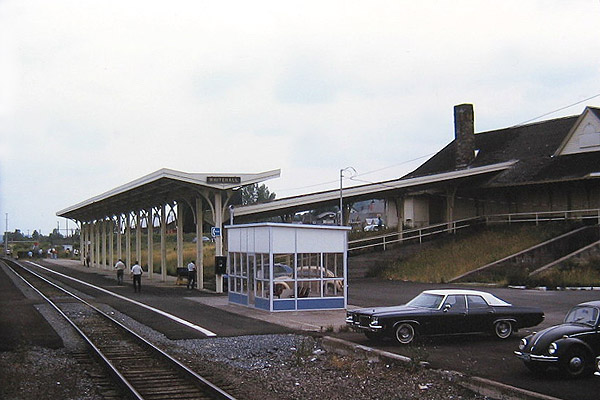
Whitehall station in July 1975

On October 1, 1850, the railroad opened a branch from just south of Whitehall to the Vermont state line near Fair Haven. Along with its Vermont subsidiary the Rutland and Whitehall Railroad (opened on November 1) and the Rutland and Washington Railroad (opened several weeks prior), this established a through rail route between Albany, New York and Rutland, Vermont. The railroad built a brick freight house and station at the junction in 1850.

After a "complicated series of bankruptcies, reorganizations, leases, and sales", the railroads were consolidated under the Rensselaer and Saratoga Railroad in 1865, which in turn became part of the Delaware and Hudson Railroad (D&H) on May 1, 1871. D&H subsidiary New York and Canada Railroad opened from Lake Station to Rouses Point (where the Champlain and St. Lawrence Railroad connected to Montreal) on December 1, 1875, eliminating the need for Lake Station as a steamship terminal. The D&H built a new station and freight house at Whitehall in 1892-93.

In 1932, the D&H realigned its mainline through Whitehall, with a short tunnel under the village center. The relocated tracks were slightly farther from the station, and a staircase connected the platform to the building. Passenger service on the Whitehall Branch to Rutland ended on June 24, 1934. Passenger service to Whitehall ended on April 30, 1971, as Amtrak did not continue D&H passenger service when it took over intercity passenger trains the next day.

Service resumed with the introduction of the Adirondack on August 5, 1974. The former station building was demolished by intentional burning on April 28, 1987. The former freight house is in use by a local business. Construction on a new Amtrak station in the village center began in April 1994 and was completed that November 14. Amtrak began operating the Ethan Allen Express over the Whitehall Branch on December 2, 1996; because the 1994-built station is north of the junction, the Ethan Allen Express does not stop at Whitehall.
