= Ira C. Allen Mansion =

Historic house in Vermont, United States

- Allen-Castle House
- U.S. Historic district – Contributing property
- Location within Vermont Location within the United States
- Location: West Park Place; Fair Haven, Vermont
- Coordinates: 43.5939167°N 73.2676536°W
- Built: 1867
- Architect: multiple
- Architectural style: French Second Empire, Italianate
- Part of: Fair Haven Green Historic District (ID80000339)

Significant dates
- Added to NRHP: November 24, 1980
- Designated CP: less than one acre

The Ira C. Allen Mansion, now the Marble Mansion Inn, is a historic property on the Green in Fair Haven, Vermont, United States. It is a contributing property to the Fair Haven Green Historic District, which was listed on the National Register of Historic Places in 1980 as the Allen-Castle House.

== History ==
In 1866 the Hon. Ira C. Allen, a former Rutland County state senator, state representative, and prominent Fair Haven businessman, purchased the property on the west side of the town Green. Allen, who had interests in real estate, banking, the railroad, marble, and slate, was a distant relative of American Revolutionary War patriot and Vermont Founding Father Ethan Allen. Allen was married to Mary E. Richardson, the niece of one of his business partners.

By 1867, Allen finished construction on the twenty-two room, 6,400-square-foot (590 m^{2}) French Second Empire/Italianate mansion. On January 1, 1868, Allen and his family moved into the home. The home was the first in Fair Haven to have electricity.

After he died, Allen left the mansion to his four children: Charles R., Ira R., Jessie A., and Francis. Charles R. Allen and his wife Jessie Dailey Allen lived on the property before he and his brothers sold their shares in 1889 to their sister, Jessie, for $15,000.00. In 1903 the home moved from Jessie A. Allen to George Vail, whose wife Elizabeth was a distant relative of the Allen family. The Vails then in turn sold the property to Aaron Vail Allen, Sr. and his wife Rebecca. The last Allen to live in the mansion Sherman Vail Allen, who died in 1975. Between 1975 and the present, the house changed hands multiple times alternating between being a residence and an inn. Currently, the Ira C. Allen Mansion operates as the Marble Mansion Inn.

== Architecture ==
The Ira C. Allen Mansion is an example of the French Second Empire and Italianate architectural style. The exterior is made from numbered white marble blocks. An Italianate porch and porte cochere encircles the main house. The wood trim is painted white. The mansion has a mansard roof and a belvedere. Also on the property is a pump house. The mansion was placed on the National Register of Historic Places on November 24, 1980.

== See also ==
- Fair Haven, Vermont
