= Middlebury station =

Train station in Middlebury, Vermont, US

Middlebury, VT
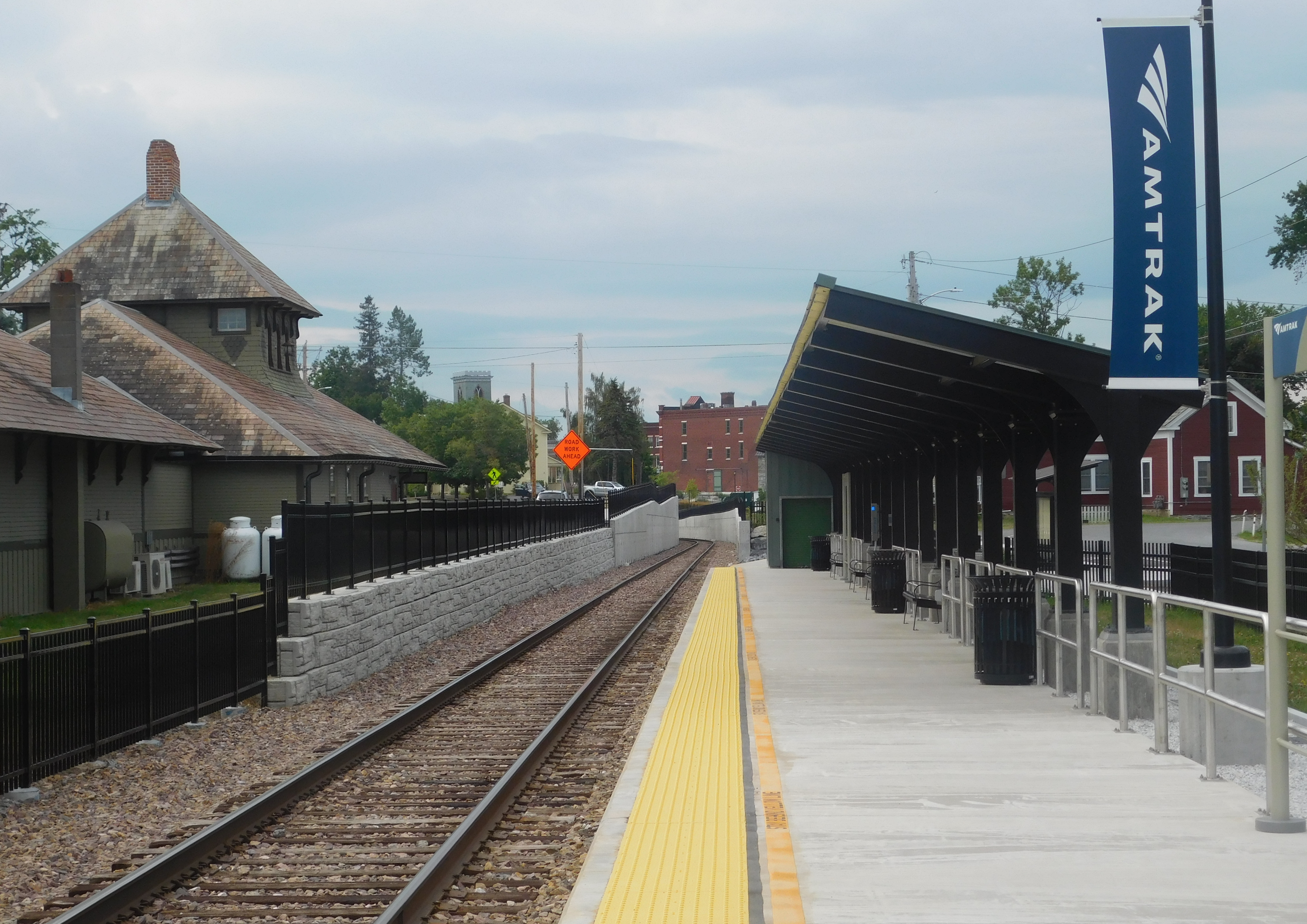
- The old and new Middlebury stations in August 2022

General information
- Location: 30 Middle Seymour Street; Middlebury, Vermont; United States
- Coordinates: 44.0177°N 73.1698°W
- Line: Vermont Railway
- Platforms: 1 side platform
- Tracks: 1

Construction
- Parking: 17 spaces
- Accessible: yes

Other information
- Status: Unstaffed station
- Station code: Amtrak: MBY

History
- Opened: July 29, 2022

Passengers
- FY 2025: 8,630 (Amtrak)

Services
Preceding station	Amtrak	Following station
Ferrisburgh–Vergennes toward Burlington	Ethan Allen Express	Rutland toward New York
Former services
Preceding station	Rutland Railroad	Following station
Beldens toward Rouses Point	Main Line	Salisbury toward North Bennington or Bellows Falls
New Haven Junction toward Montreal	Green Mountain Flyer / Mount Royal	Brandon toward New York or Boston
Location

Middlebury station is an Amtrak train station in Middlebury, Vermont. The station opened on July 29, 2022 when the Ethan Allen Express was extended from Rutland to Burlington.

== History ==
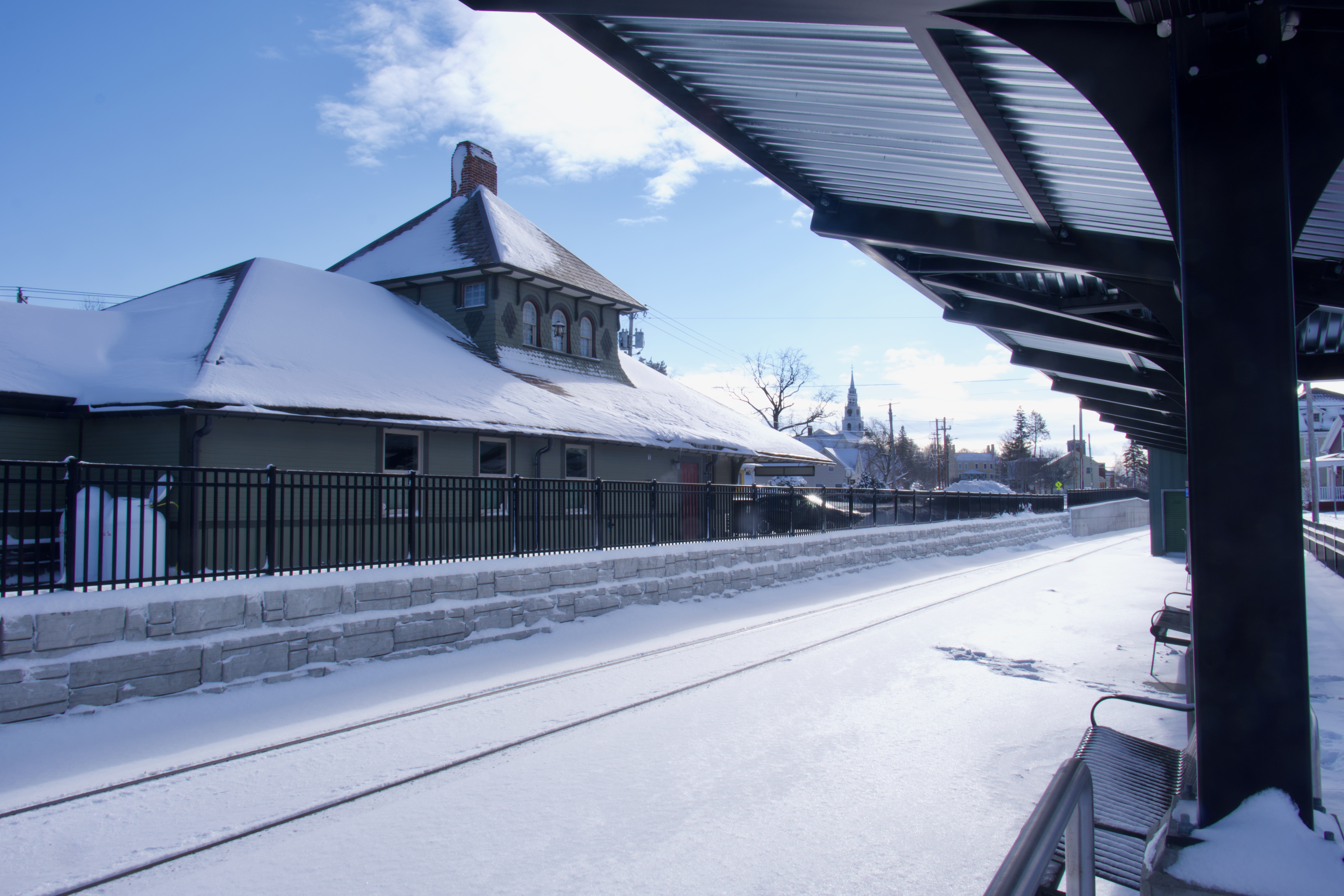
The historic station building sits across the track from the platform

Passengers service to Middlebury on the Rutland and Burlington Railroad (later part of the Rutland Railroad) began in September 1849. A new station was built in 1891 after the former station burned. The station and 1870s-built freight house were moved to the east side of the tracks in 1912 to accommodate construction of the Seymour Street underpass. The Rutland Railroad ended passenger service in 1953; the station and freight house were converted for other use.

Since 2014, Vermont Translines has run intercity motorcoach service from Albany to Burlington up the U.S. Route 7 corridor through Middlebury. The company later joined the Amtrak Thruway network, adding train connections at Albany–Rensselaer station. The Middlebury bus stop is located close to Davis Family Library at Middlebury College.

=== Modern station ===
In plans to build a new station, the Vermont Agency of Transportation (VTrans) assumed responsibility for constructing a 300-foot-long-by-12-foot-wide platform, 200-foot canopy, wheelchair lift, and lighting, while the town covered land acquisition, parking, access roads, landscaping, and amenities. A station house has not been planned.

In April 2018, the Town of Middlebury hired the engineering firm VHB to study potential sites for a new train platform. By September 2018, VHB had presented four sites for public consideration. Middlebury eventually selected the cheapest and most popular option: a site across the tracks from the historic train station that required no additional property acquisition.

In February 2021, VTrans announced that Kubricky Construction Corporation of Waterbury had been hired to build the platform and canopy, and that work would begin in the summer once the downtown bridge project was complete. Construction was well underway by July 2021, and was expected to be finished by August 31. The on-site inspector said the structure was built to last for 100 years. Workers discovered and removed old water and sewer pipes during the excavation.

Once the platform was in place, the town hired Munson Earth Moving to construct parking facilities. The plan called for 17 parking spaces, though Middlebury's planning director said overflow parking might be needed if train ridership is high. The town also invested in new sidewalks, crosswalks, and curbing to better connect the station to Riverfront Park, Middlebury College, and downtown businesses.

By November 2021, the station as a whole was said to be nearing completion. The total cost was estimated at $665,000, with VTrans paying $250,000 and Middlebury paying the rest.

By April 2022, train service was announced to begin in July. The Vermont chapter of Operation Lifesaver worked to raise railroad safety awareness in Middlebury ahead of the station's opening.

==== Downtown rail tunnel ====
In conjunction with restoring passenger train service to Middlebury, the Main Street and Merchant's Row bridges over the rail line needed to be addressed. VTrans and Middlebury had replaced the 100-year-old bridges with temporary spans in 2017 following an emergency closure. In summer 2020, the roads were closed for ten weeks while a 360-foot (110 m) long rail tunnel was constructed. The new tunnel has an additional 4 feet (1.2 m) of clearance, accommodating double-stack rail cars. It also created new public space in Triangle Park next to St. Stephen's Episcopal Church. The first train went through the tunnel on September 18, 2020, as part of a reopening celebration.

Due to the bridge's proximity to Otter Creek, additional drainage had to be added. The project delayed construction on the Middlebury station, and with it the entire Burlington extension project, as the Middlebury station's platform ended where the grade to a new 19 ft (5.8 m) tunnel began.

The project was completed within budget at a cost of $91.5 million: $72 million for construction, $14.8 million for right-of-way, $4.4 million for engineering, and $300,000 for utility relocation. All costs were shared by Vermont and the Federal Highway Administration. The COVID-19 pandemic was said to have caused delays, but not increased costs.
