= Rutland station =

Railway station in Rutland, Vermont, US

Rutland, VT
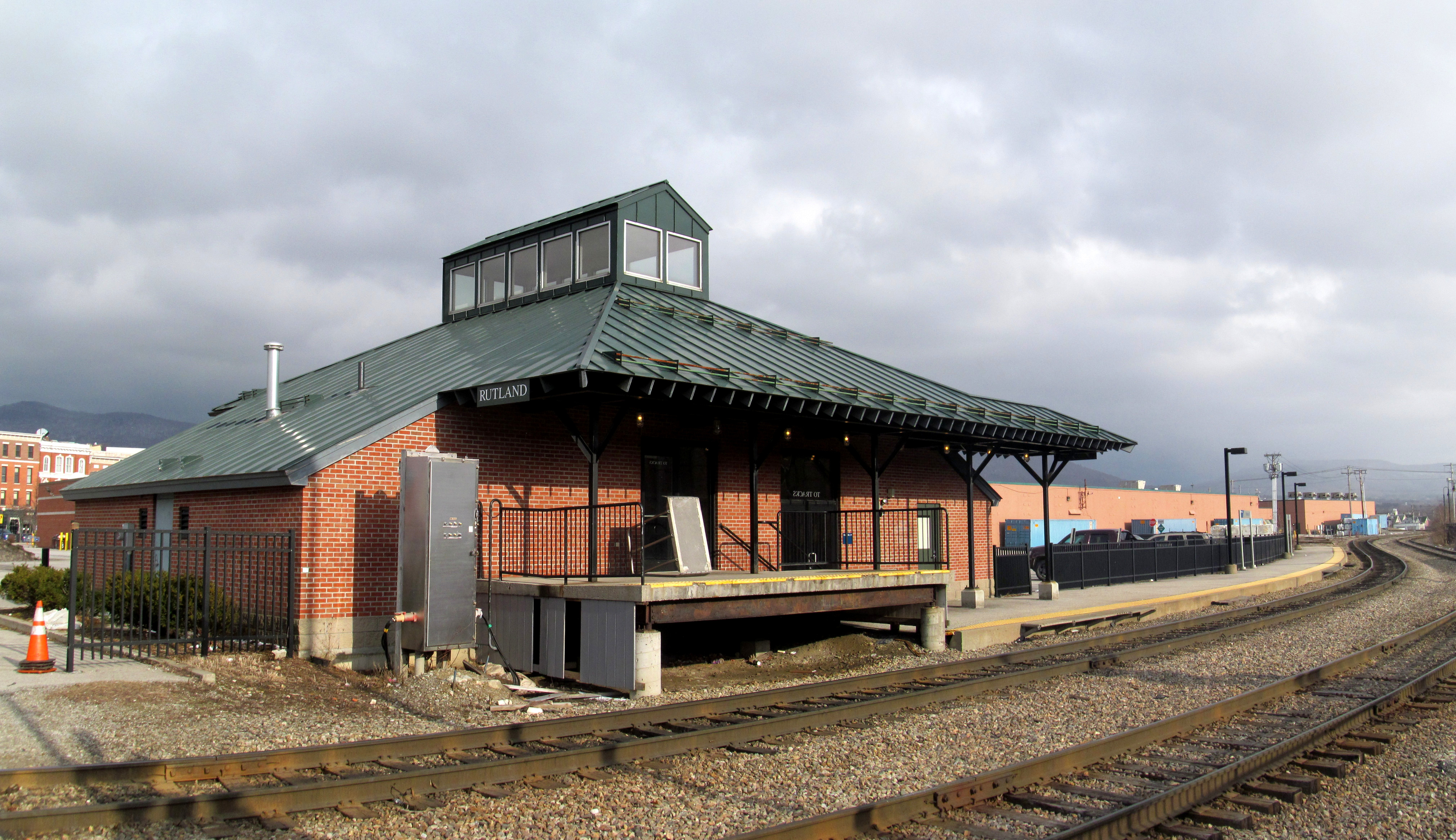
- Rutland station in March 2013

General information
- Location: 25 Evelyn Street; Rutland, Vermont; United States
- Coordinates: 43°36′21″N 72°58′54″W
- Owner: City of Rutland
- Line: Vermont Railway
- Platforms: 1 side platform
- Tracks: 2

Construction
- Parking: Yes
- Accessible: Yes

Other information
- Status: Unstaffed station with waiting room
- Station code: Amtrak: RUD

History
- Opened: December 2, 1996
- Rebuilt: 1999

Passengers
- FY 2025: 10,537 (Amtrak)

Services
Preceding station	Amtrak	Following station
Middlebury toward Burlington	Ethan Allen Express	Reverses direction
Castleton toward New York	Ethan Allen Express	Reverses direction
Former services
Preceding station	Rutland Railroad	Following station
Center Rutland toward Rouses Point	Main Line	Alfrecha toward Bellows Falls
Center Rutland toward Rouses Point	Main Line	North Clarendon toward North Bennington
Proctor toward Montreal	Green Mountain Flyer / Mount Royal	Ludlow toward Boston
Proctor toward Montreal	Green Mountain Flyer / Mount Royal	Wallingford toward New York
Preceding station	Delaware and Hudson Railway	Following station
Center Rutland toward Eagle Bridge	Eagle Bridge – Rutland	Terminus
Center Rutland toward Whitehall	Whitehall – Rutland	Terminus
Preceding station	Amtrak	Following station
Terminus	Ethan Allen Express	Fair Haven toward New York
Location

Rutland station is a train station in Rutland, Vermont served by Amtrak, the national railroad passenger system. It is served by the single daily round trip of the Ethan Allen Express. The station has a single low-level side platform, with a short high-level section for accessible level boarding.

== History ==
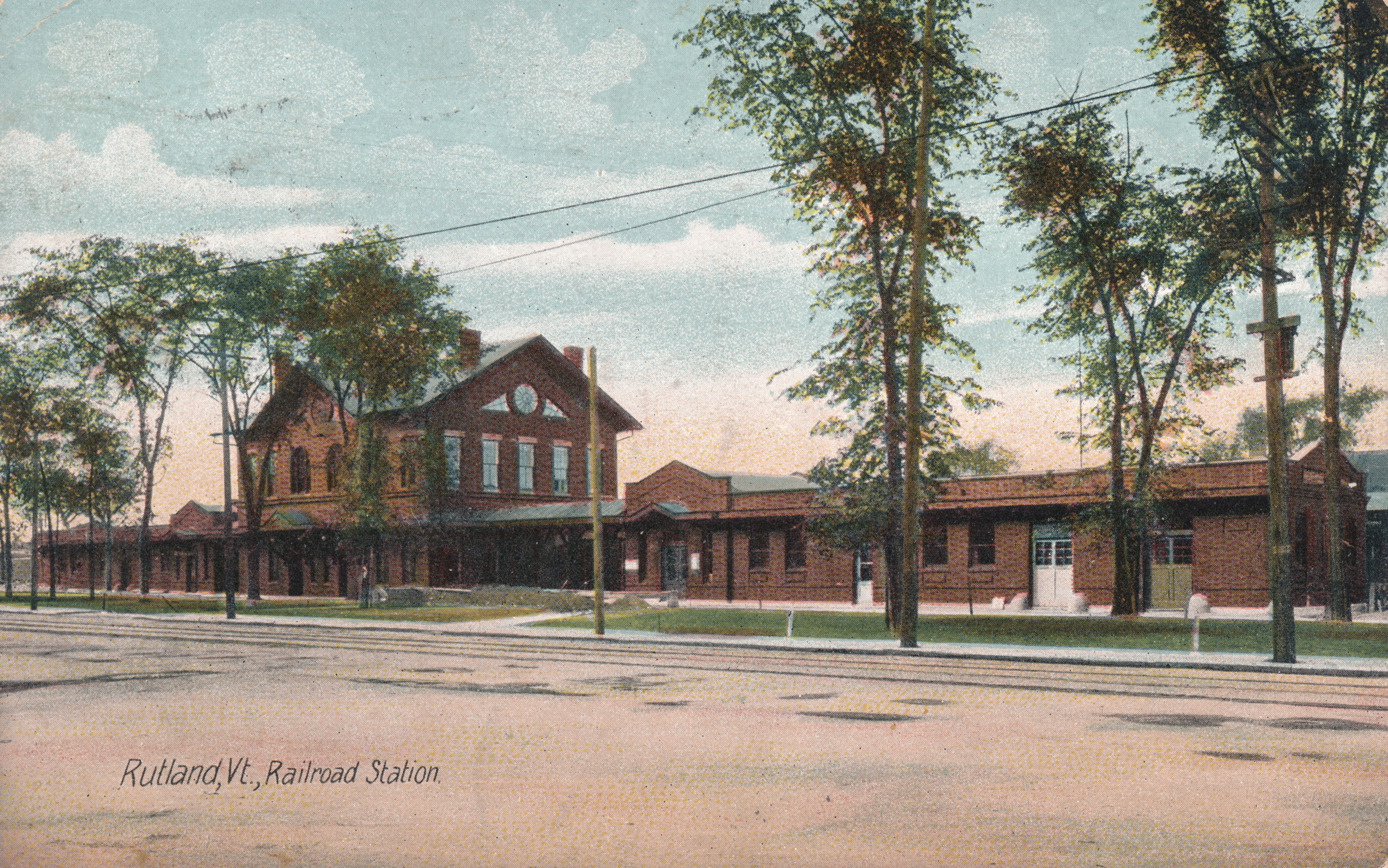
The original Rutland depot, c. 1907

Rutland's first railway station was built near Merchants' Row in 1853–54 by the Rutland Railroad. In 1905-06 wings were added to the north and south of the depot. Passenger service west of Whitehall and Eagle Bridge ended on June 24, 1934. The building served the city of Rutland until New York City to Montreal passenger service ended in 1953 (the Rutland RR's Green Mountain Flyer and Mount Royal), and two years later it was demolished.

Amtrak service to Rutland commenced on December 2, 1996, with service provided to a temporary station platform. The station, which is located near the former Rutland Railroad yard on the western edge of downtown, opened in 1999. Designed by local firm NBF Architects, the station has walls of red brick that rise from a base of textured gray concrete block. To celebrate Rutland native Jim Jeffords, who represented Vermont in Congress, city leaders renamed the station the “James M. Jeffords Rail Passenger Welcome Center.”

From March 2020 to July 19, 2021, all Amtrak service in Vermont was suspended in response to the COVID-19 pandemic, with the Ethan Allen Express truncated to Albany–Rensselaer station. The Ethan Allen Express was extended from Rutland to Union Station in Burlington, Vermont on July 29, 2022.
