= Ferrisburgh–Vergennes station =

Train station in Ferrisburgh, Vermont, US

Ferrisburgh–Vergennes, VT
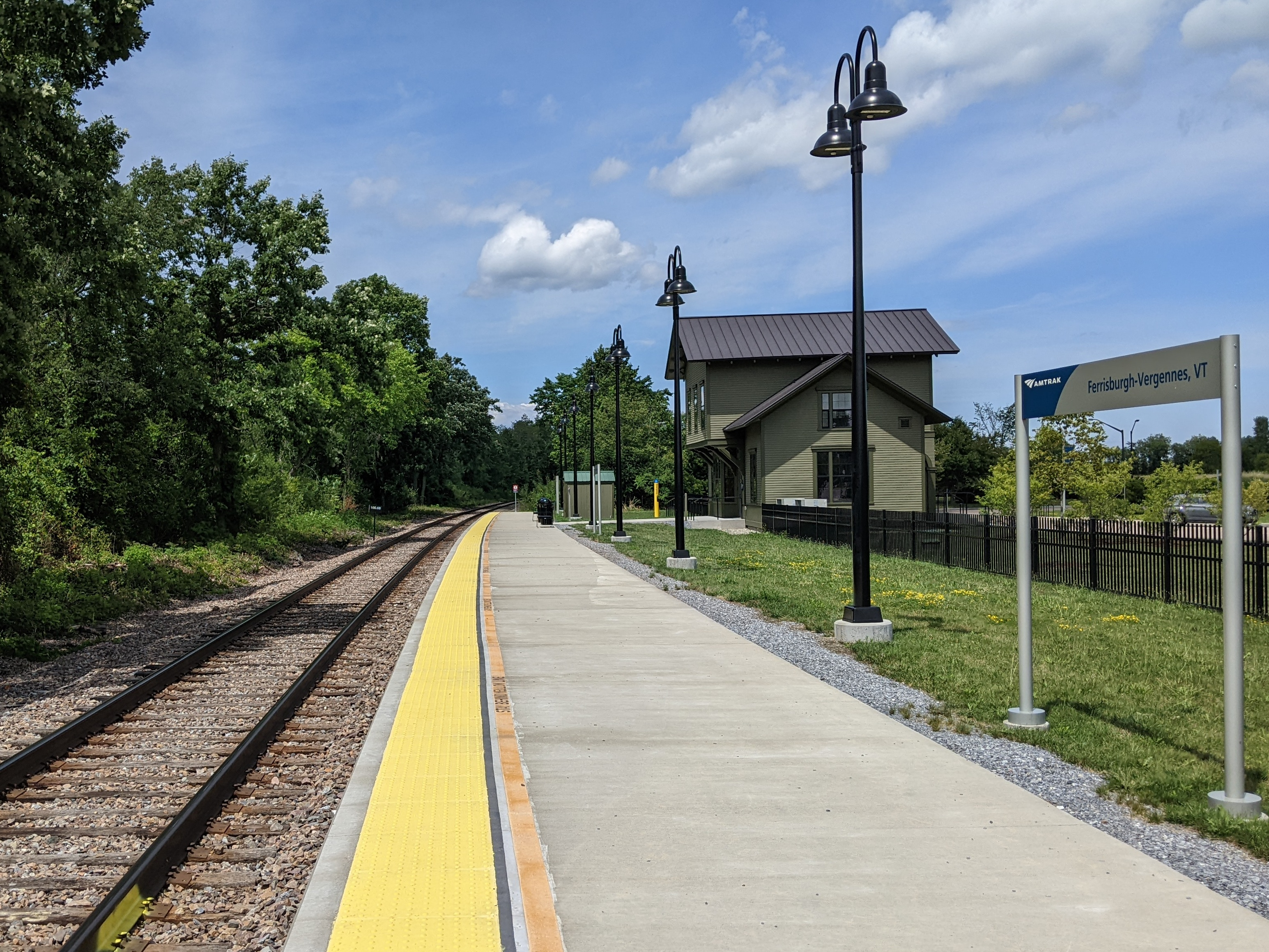
- Ferrisburgh–Vergennes station in July 2022

General information
- Location: 49 Park Lane; Ferrisburgh, Vermont; United States
- Coordinates: 44.1809°N 73.2489°W
- Line: Vermont Railway
- Platforms: 1 side platform
- Tracks: 1
- Connections: Tri-Valley Transit; Vermont Translines

Construction
- Parking: 77 spaces
- Accessible: Yes

Other information
- Status: Unstaffed station with waiting room
- Station code: Amtrak: VRN

History
- Opened: July 25, 2007 (park and ride); July 29, 2022 (train station)

Passengers
- FY 2025: 3,745 (Amtrak)

Services
Preceding station	Amtrak	Following station
Burlington Terminus	Ethan Allen Express	Middlebury toward New York
Former services
Preceding station	Rutland Railroad	Following station
Ferrisburg station
North Ferrisburg toward Rouses Point	Main Line	Vergennes toward North Bennington or Bellows Falls
Vergennes station
Ferrisburgh toward Rouses Point	Main Line	New Haven Junction toward North Bennington or Bellows Falls
North Ferrisburgh toward Montreal	Green Mountain Flyer / Mount Royal	New Haven Junction toward New York or Boston
- Vergennes Station House
- U.S. National Register of Historic Places
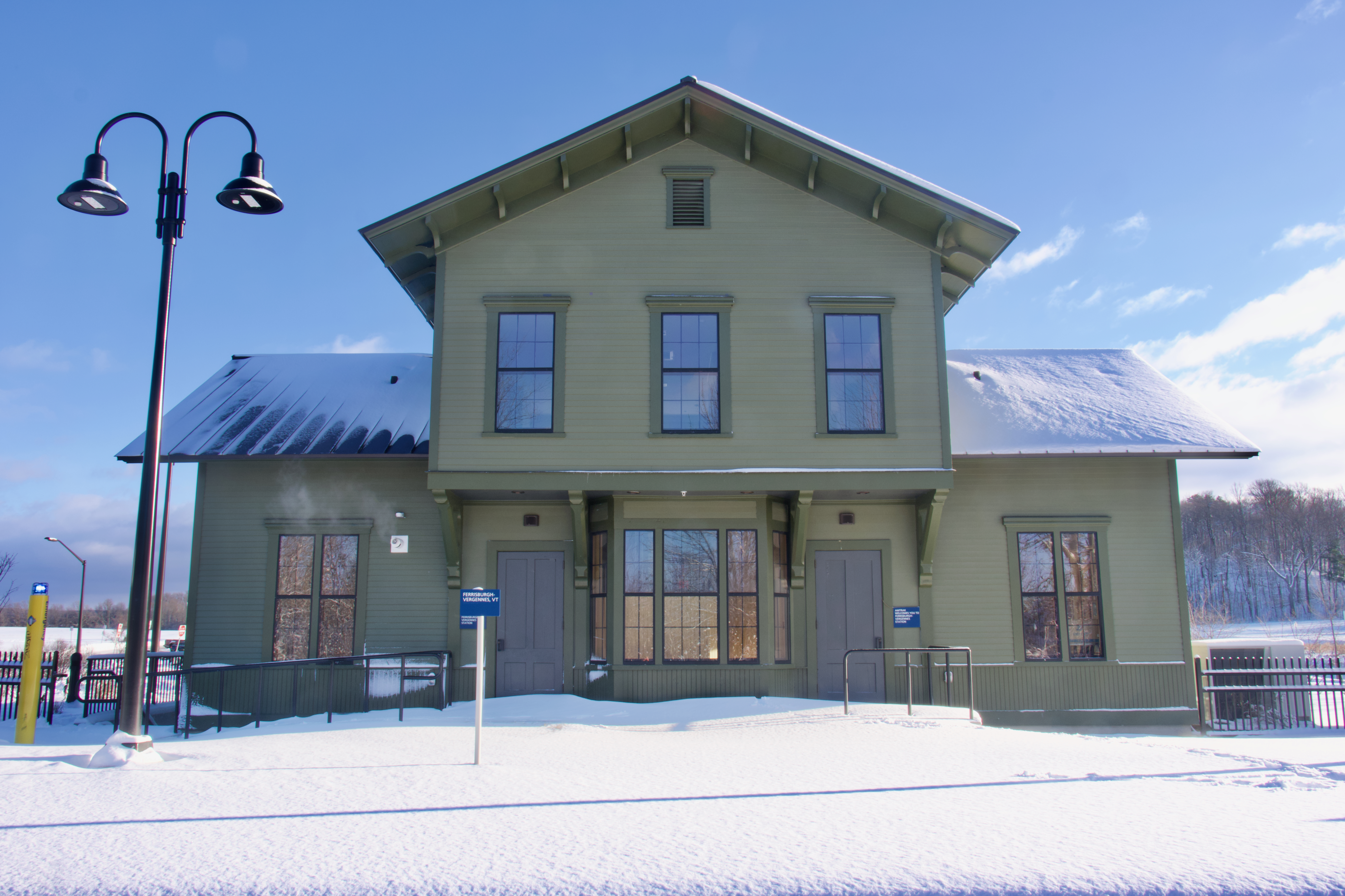
- The trackside face of the Vergennes Station House
- NRHP reference No.: 100006640
- Added to NRHP: May 28, 2021
Location

Ferrisburgh–Vergennes station is an intermodal Amtrak and bus station in Ferrisburgh, Vermont, adjacent to the city of Vergennes. The facility opened in 2007 as a free park and ride lot operated by the Vermont Agency of Transportation (VTrans). Bus service is provided by Tri-Valley Transit and Vermont Translines. The historic station building serves passengers at the Amtrak platform located along the southwest corner of the facility. It was listed on the National Register of Historic Places in 2021 as the Vergennes Station House. Rail service began on July 29, 2022, when the Ethan Allen Express was extended from Rutland to Burlington.

== Services ==
Tri-Valley Transit, the public transit provider for Addison County, provides regional bus service to the park and ride. As of 2022, the Burlington LINK Express serves the station twice in each direction each weekday (thrice on Saturdays) on a route between Middlebury and Burlington.

Vermont Translines provides intercity motorcoach service to the station on its route following U.S. Route 7 between Albany and Burlington. Two buses run per day in each direction. The route is codeshared with Greyhound and Amtrak Thruway, allowing riders to book longer trips on a single ticket. The bus stop was previously assigned Amtrak station code VGN, but now uses code VRN, as does the train station.

Amtrak's Ethan Allen Express serves Ferrisburgh–Vergennes with one daily round trip. The station has one low-level side platform to the northeast of the single track. A portable wheelchair lift makes the station accessible.

Once a year, the excursion railroad company Vermont Railway Systems offers a round-trip from Ferrisburgh-Vergennes to Burlington for the 3rd of July Fireworks Celebration.

== History ==
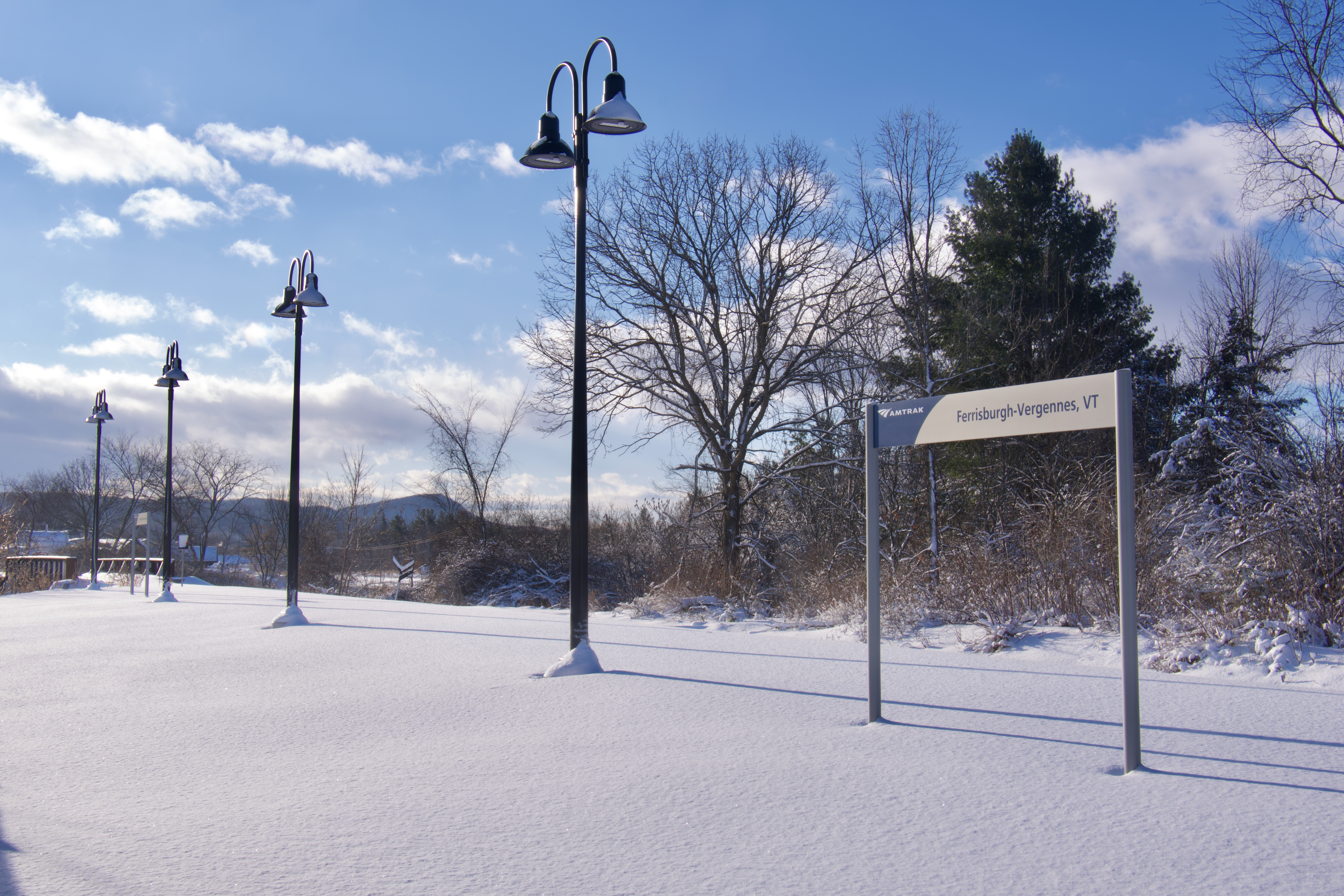
South-facing view of the completed platform prior to the start of service

The Rutland and Burlington Railroad (R&B) opened between Burlington and Bellows Falls on December 18, 1849, with regular service beginning December 24. The line cut through the northeast corner of Vergennes, Vermont, where the railroad built a station house, freight depot, and related buildings around 1851. The town saw passenger trains for over 100 years, when in 1953 the service was discontinued to Vergennes. The station house subsequently fell into disrepair.

The 85-space Ferrisburgh Park and Ride lot opened near the junction of U.S. Route 7 and Vermont Route 22A in southern Ferrisburgh on July 25, 2007. It was built at a cost of $1.1 million. Chittenden County Transportation Authority (now Green Mountain Transit) and Addison County Transit Resources (now Tri-Valley Transit) began serving a stop at the park-and-ride lot on August 27, 2007. In October 2017, Vermont Translines began serving the Ferrisburgh Park and Ride with the single daily round trip of its Albany–Burlington bus route. All interstate services from Vermont, including the Albany–Burlington route, were suspended on March 26, 2020, due to the COVID-19 pandemic. It resumed on July 19, 2021, with two daily round trips.

In 2012, the VTrans announced that the dilapidated Vergennes station building would be moved 1,000 feet (300 m) up the rail line from Vergennes to the Ferrisburgh Park and Ride facility and completely rehabilitated. Phase I of the project involved moving the building to a new foundation and restoring its exterior, while Phase II consisted of renovating its interior. The project was engineered for VTrans by Stantec. Phase I was budgeted at $1.3 million, with $700,000 coming from the 2012 Vermont transportation budget and $400,000 from a federal grant. Millbrook Building and Remodeling relocated the building on October 27, 2012.

In December 2017, the Ferrisburgh Zoning Board of Adjustment approved a permit to renovate the interior of the station house and build an adjacent train platform.

The station house was added to the National Register of Historic Places in May 2021. The rehabilitation project won the 2021 Merit Award from the American Council of Engineering Companies of Vermont in the Special Projects category.

In October 2019 VTrans started construction of a platform adjacent to the station building. By December 2020, VTrans called the station "substantially complete," and in November 2021 said the only thing left to do was find a station agent. Ethan Allen Express service began on July 29, 2022.

== Architecture ==
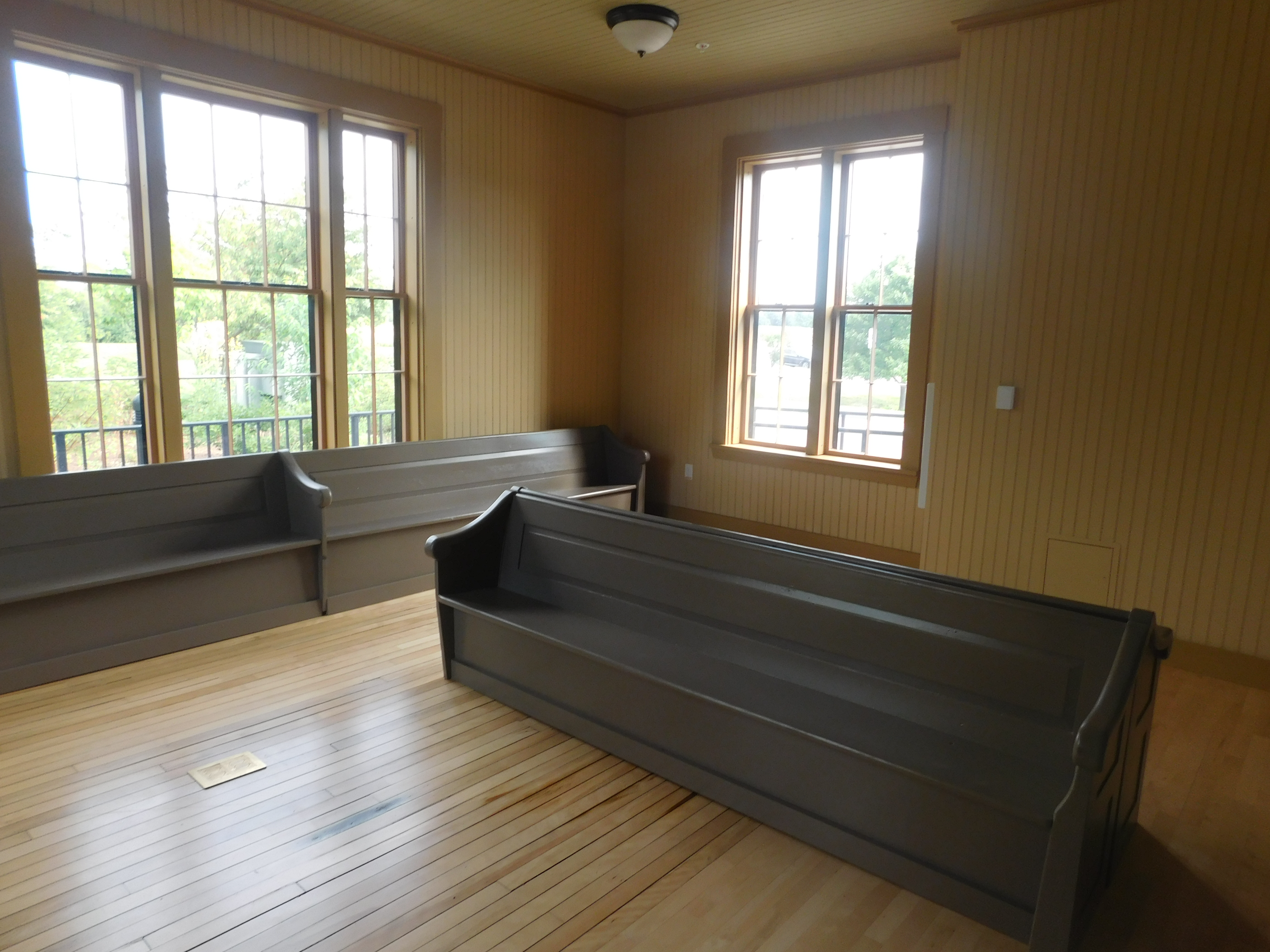
Waiting area inside the restored station house in August 2022

The Vergennes Station House was built about 1851, probably to a design by Vermont architect Gurdon P. Randall. Randall was a protegé of Asher Benjamin, and specialized for some years in the design of railroad-related buildings. It was originally located just north of downtown Vergennes, about 1/3 of a mile south of its present location, on the opposite side of the track and in reversed orientation. It is a two-story frame structure, with a gabled roof at its center and 1 1/2-story gabled wings extending to the sides. The front facade is dominated by three arches, the outer of which are blind and closed with clapboard siding, with the center one housing the main entrance. It is covered by a modern standing seam metal roof, with reproduced Italianate bracketing along the eaves and gable edges. It is considered an unusually good instance of early Italianate architecture in Vermont.
