= Ethan Allen Express =

Intercity rail service in the United States

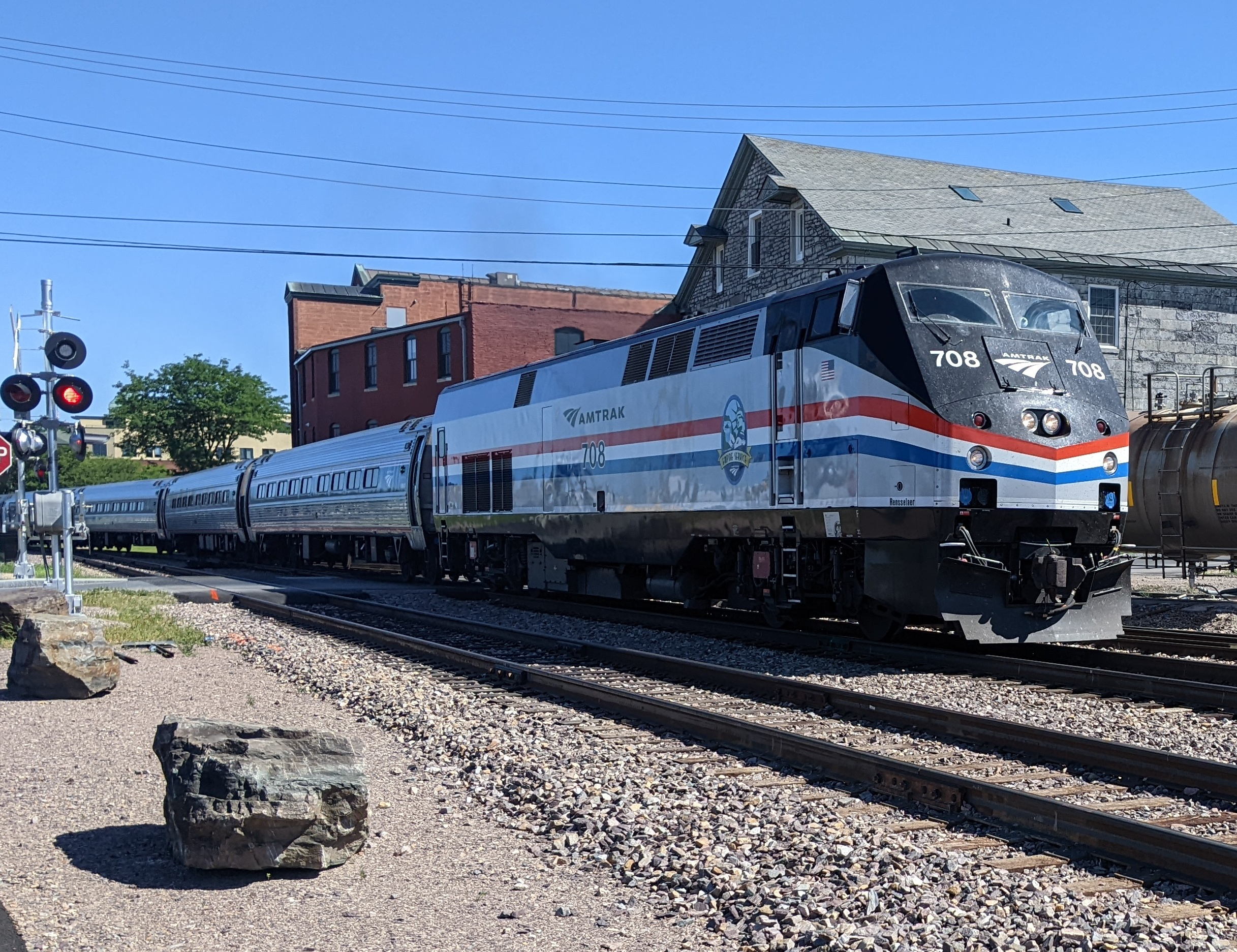
- The Ethan Allen Express departing Burlington in July 2022

Overview
- Service type: Intercity rail
- First service: December 2, 1996
- Current operator: Amtrak
- Annual ridership: 85,314 (FY 25) ▼ -4.1% (Note: Amtrak's Fiscal Year (FY) runs from October 1 of the prior year to September 30 of the named year.)

Route
- Termini: New York City; Burlington, Vermont
- Stops: 15
- Distance travelled: 310 miles (500 km)
- Average journey time: 7 hours, 2–7 minutes
- Service frequency: One daily round trip
- Train number: 290, 291

On-board services
- Classes: Coach, business
- Disabled access: All cars, all stations
- Catering facilities: Café car

Technical
- Rolling stock: Amfleet coaches
- Track gauge: 4 ft 8 1/2 in (1,435 mm) standard gauge
- Operating speed: 44 mph (71 km/h) (avg.); 110 mph (180 km/h) (top)
- Track owners: Amtrak, CPKC, CSX, MNRR, VTR

The Ethan Allen Express is a daily passenger train operated by Amtrak in the United States between New York City and Burlington, Vermont, via Albany, New York. One daily round trip is operated on a 310-mile (500 km) north–south route with an approximately 7-hour scheduled running time. The train is subsidized by New York and Vermont for the portion north of Albany. It is named for Vermont cofounder and American Revolutionary War hero Ethan Allen.

Ethan Allen Express service began on December 2, 1996, acting as an extended Empire Service train. It was the first passenger service to Rutland since 1953 and the first to use the line between Rutland and Whitehall since 1934. The train's schedule has been adjusted a number of times, particularly in the early years of its operation, in an attempt to serve both tourists to Vermont and Vermonters traveling to New York City. From February 1998 to April 2002, a second northbound trip was operated – at some times only a shuttle service from Albany.

An infill station in Fair Haven, Vermont, was added in November 1997; it was replaced with a stop in nearby Castleton in January 2010. Service north of Albany was suspended from March 2020 to July 2021 due to the COVID-19 pandemic. An extension to Burlington, Vermont, with new stations in Middlebury and Vergennes began service on July 29, 2022. Further proposed expansions include a second daily train running via North Bennington, Vermont; an extension to Essex Junction, Vermont, to connect with the Vermonter; and additional infill stations and higher speeds in Vermont.

== Operation ==
=== Route ===
The Ethan Allen Express operates approximately north–south between New York Penn Station and Burlington, save for an approximately east–west section between Whitehall, New York, and Rutland, Vermont. All of the route south of Whitehall is also used by the Adirondack. The stretch between Schenectady and New York City is also used by Empire Service, Lake Shore Limited, and Maple Leaf trains; the Ethan Allen Express acts as an additional Empire Service trip on this portion. The train is scheduled for 7 hours 2 minutes between Burlington and New York City southbound, and 7 hours 7 minutes northbound. Southbound trips depart in the morning, while northbound trips depart in the early afternoon.

The train operates over the following trackage:

- Vermont Railway: Burlington, Vermont–Whitehall
- Canadian Pacific Kansas City: Canadian Subdivision (Whitehall–Glenville, New York) and Freight Subdivision (Glenville–Schenectady, New York)
- CSX Transportation/Amtrak Hudson Subdivision: Schenectady–Poughkeepsie, New York
- Metro-North Railroad Hudson Line: Poughkeepsie–Spuyten Duyvil, Bronx, New York City
- Amtrak Empire Connection: Spuyten Duyvil–New York Penn Station

The Ethan Allen Express operates as higher-speed rail on the Hudson Subdivision, with speeds up to 110 mph (180 km/h). Maximum speeds are 80 mph (130 km/h) on the Hudson Line, 60 mph (97 km/h) on the Empire Connection, 50 mph (80 km/h) on the Freight Subdivision, 60 mph (97 km/h) on the Canadian Subdivision, and 59 mph (95 km/h) on the Vermont Railway.

=== Equipment ===
A typical Ethan Allen Express train in New York City

Ethan Allen Express trains typically have five Amfleet passenger cars: four coaches plus a club car with 2x1 business class seating and a cafe area. Trains operate with two GE P32AC-DM dual-mode locomotives, one at each end, which operate on third rail electric power in Penn Station and the Empire Connection tunnel and on diesel power for the rest of the route.

In the late 2020s and early 2030s, all equipment will be replaced with Amtrak Airo trainsets, the railroad's branding of its combination of Siemens Venture passenger cars and a Siemens Charger diesel-electric locomotive. The trainsets for the Ethan Allen Express will have six passenger cars, which will include a cab control car food service area and a mix of 2x2 coach and 2x1 business class seating. The car closest to the locomotive will have batteries to supply electricity to traction motors in the locomotive when operating in Penn Station and the Empire Connection tunnel, eliminating the need for third rail propulsion.

=== Ridership and funding ===
Ridership in Fiscal Year 2025 was 85,314. The train is subsidized by New York and Vermont for the portion north of Albany, in proportion to mileage on that section in each state. In FY 2019, the Vermont portion of the subsidy (44%) was $1.57 million, while the New York portion was about $2 million.

The Vermont Agency of Transportation subsidizes discounted fares for most intra-Vermont travel on the route. The route is supplemented by two daily bus round trips operated by Vermont Translines between Albany and Burlington which act as Amtrak Thruway connections to Empire Corridor trains at Albany–Rensselaer. These bus routes also provide Amtrak connections for several Vermont towns presently without direct Amtrak service, such as Bennington and Manchester.

== History ==
=== Planning and service start ===
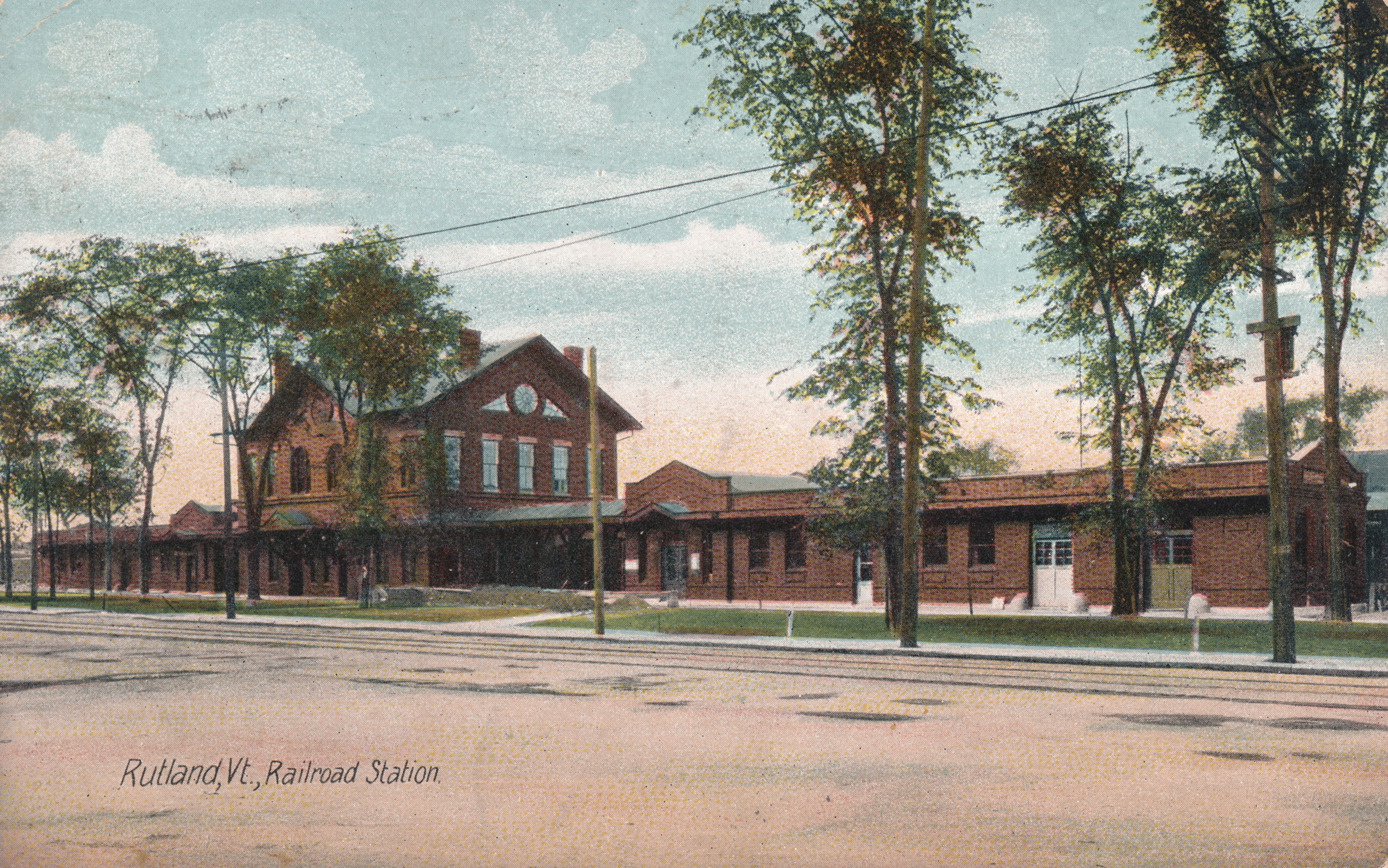
The former station in Rutland, served by the Rutland Railway until 1953

Prior passenger service between Rutland and points south was operated by the Delaware and Hudson Railroad over the Whitehall Branch (Rutland–Whitehall) and Washington Branch (Castleton–Eagle Bridge) and by the Rutland Railroad over its mainline (Bellows Falls–Rutland–Burlington) and Chatham Branch (Rutland–Chatham). Washington Branch and Whitehall Branch passenger service ended on June 24, 1934. The Rutland Railroad continued to operate passenger service to Rutland, including the New York City–Montreal Green Mountain Flyer and Mount Royal, until 1953. After the Rutland filed to abandoned its entire system in 1963, the state-owned Vermont Railway took over freight service on most of the lines in 1964. The Central Vermont Railway continued to operate the Montrealer, providing passenger service to the eastern and northern parts of the state, until 1966. Amtrak took over intercity passenger service in the United States in 1971 and resumed the overnight Montrealer in 1972.

Politicians including Curtis McCormack unsuccessfully attempted to obtain funding for Amtrak service to Rutland in the 1980s. Then-governor Howard Dean created the Vermont Rail Council headed by McCormack in 1991, with instruction to study Rutland service, but most attention was focused on the Montrealer. In late 1994, Amtrak announced that the Montrealer would be discontinued due to budget cuts. While state officials worked to retain that service, adding a route to Rutland (and possibly Burlington) was also supported by Dean. In April 1995, the Montrealer was cut back to St. Albans as the state-subsidized Vermonter on a daytime schedule. Later that month, $3.5 million was included in a federal funding bill. Along with $1 million from the Vermont Railway and $743,000 from the state, this funded $5.24 million in trackwork, which upgraded 21 miles (34 km) of the Whitehall Branch from 25 miles per hour (40 km/h) to 59 miles per hour (95 km/h) maximum speed.

The state originally planned to call the new service the Green Mountain Flyer after the former Rutland Railroad train. However, the Green Mountain Railroad objected, as they already used that name for a tourist train. On August 15, 1996, the state announced it would be called the Ethan Allen Express after Vermont cofounder and American Revolutionary War patriot Ethan Allen. The state agreed to a $200,000 annual subsidy, which reflected the cost of extending one Empire Service round trip from Albany to Rutland. Service began with the northbound trip on December 2, 1996, with the first southbound trip the following day. The Ethan Allen Express began with stops in Rutland, Fort Edward, Saratoga Springs, Schenectady, Albany–Rensselaer, Hudson, Rhinecliff, Poughkeepsie, Croton, Yonkers and New York City. Because the Adirondack already served the section between New York City and Whitehall, the Ethan Allen Express only added 44 route miles (71 km) and one station (Rutland) to the Amtrak system. A trailer was used as a temporary station at Rutland; the station building, funded by $700,000 from the federal government, did not open until 1999.

=== Early service changes ===
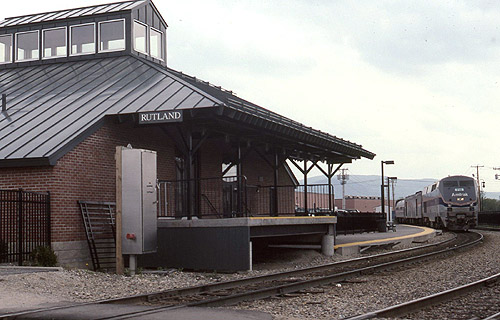
The Ethan Allen Express at Rutland in 2001

The Ethan Allen Express was intended to support tourism in the Rutland areas, particularly winter travel to Killington Ski Resort and Pico Mountain. The train's schedule has been adjusted a number of times, particularly in the early years of its operation, in an attempt to serve both tourists to Vermont and Vermonters traveling to New York City. The initial schedule had a running time slightly over five hours, with afternoon departures from both terminals on weekdays. Saturday southbound trains departed Rutland at 7:05am to allow for weekend trips to New York City, while Sunday trains in both directions departed in the later afternoon to accommodate weekend trips.

In October 1997, the southbound Saturday departure moved to the same afternoon time as weekdays, while the Friday and Sunday northbound departures moved to the late-afternoon time. An infill station at Fair Haven was added on November 12, 1997. On February 15, 1998, Amtrak added a morning northbound train from Albany to Rutland, providing a connection from the northbound Maple Leaf; this gave a second northbound trip to Rutland, though still only one southbound trip. The change reduced the state subsidy by eliminating the need for overnight crew accommodations: the morning northbound trip turned around to become the afternoon southbound trip, while the afternoon northbound trip deadheaded from Rutland to Albany in the late evening for servicing.

In October 1998, the Sunday southbound departure was shifted two hours later to allow more time for skiers, while the Saturday southbound departure was moved up to match weekdays. From August 16 to October 31, 1999, the Vermont Railway operated the Ethan Allen Connection between Rutland and Burlington with an intermediate stop at Middlebury. It was discontinued due to low ridership; most passengers only rode between Rutland and Burlington, with just 20–25% connecting to the Ethan Allen Express. On October 31, northbound service was reconfigured. A daily train departed New York at 6:15 am – an hour earlier than the Maple Leaf. The afternoon northbound train continued to run Monday–Thursday; the Saturday northbound shifted to that time, while the Sunday afternoon northbound was canceled. The Friday northbound trip became an express operating nonstop between New York and Schenectady, with a 4 1/2 hour schedule – the fastest time ever scheduled for the Ethan Allen Express.

A baggage car was added to the train for bikes and ski equipment in late 1998, but it could not be used for luggage until February 2000 when an attendant was hired for Rutland station. The baggage car was removed in 2002 due to low usage, elimination of station agents due to state budget cuts, and the older baggage cars not being certified for as high speeds as the rest of the train. The schedule was simplified on April 29, 2001: daily afternoon trips in both direction, plus a morning Albany–Rutland northbound trip with no New York connection. The morning trip became a New York–Rutland trip on July 9, while the Sunday trip was again moved to later in the afternoon. The morning trip was cut back to an Albany–Rutland shuttle in January 2002 and discontinued entirely that April. In April 2003, the Friday northbound trip was moved later in the evening, while weekday southbound trips were moved to a 7:15 am departure. Monday and Saturday southbound departures were moved to 10:45 am in November 2004. The Monday southbound trip was moved back to match the other weekdays in October 2007.

=== Further changes ===
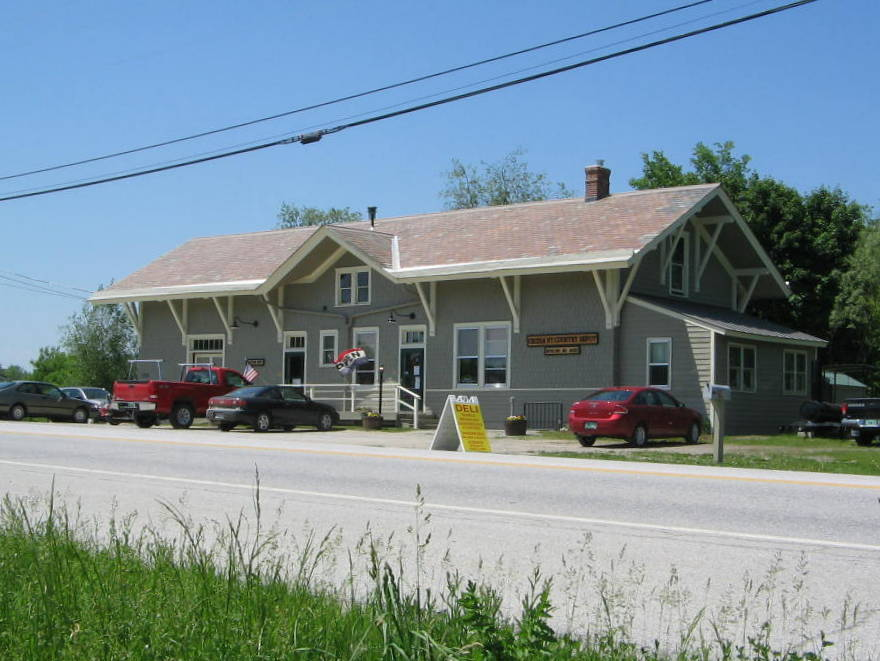
Castleton station (pictured) replaced Fair Haven station in January 2010

In October 2008, the Vermont Agency of Transportation (VTrans) proposed eliminating the Ethan Allen Express and replacing it with a bus, citing budgetary restrictions. The proposal was rejected by a legislative committee. VTrans again proposed ending service in January 2009. Opposition from the Vermont Rail Action Network and local political leaders resulted in the service being kept. On January 2, 2010, the Ethan Allen Express began stopping at Castleton. Service to Fair Haven ended on January 9.

Beginning in the mid-2000s, poor track conditions between Whitehall and Rutland also affected the train's performance. In February 2011, VTrans began an investigation into the Vermont Rail System's handling of the Ethan Allen Express after Amtrak ranked VRS as the worst host railroad in the country. On-time performance of the train was below 70% by that time, with track conditions responsible for 91% of delays. Vermont Rail Systems began track work in April 2011, which reduced travel times by 10 minutes by that October. The project, funded by both the railroad and the state of New York at a cost of $3.25 million, involved rebuilding about 8 miles (13 km) of track and eight grade crossings. By February 2012, additional trackwork had resulted in a 15-minute southbound and 25-minute northbound reduction in travel time between Rutland and Whitehall.

The Friday northbound trip operated on the same mid-afternoon schedule from July 10 to September 5, 2017, during track work at New York Penn Station. From May 26 to September 3, 2018, the Ethan Allen Express and other Empire Corridor trains were diverted to Grand Central Terminal during further Penn Station track work. On March 26, 2020, the Ethan Allen Express was suspended north of Albany–Rensselaer at the request of Vermont Governor Phil Scott due to the COVID-19 pandemic. Service to Rutland resumed on July 19, 2021, with $1 promotional fares on that date for travel within Vermont.

=== Extension to Burlington ===
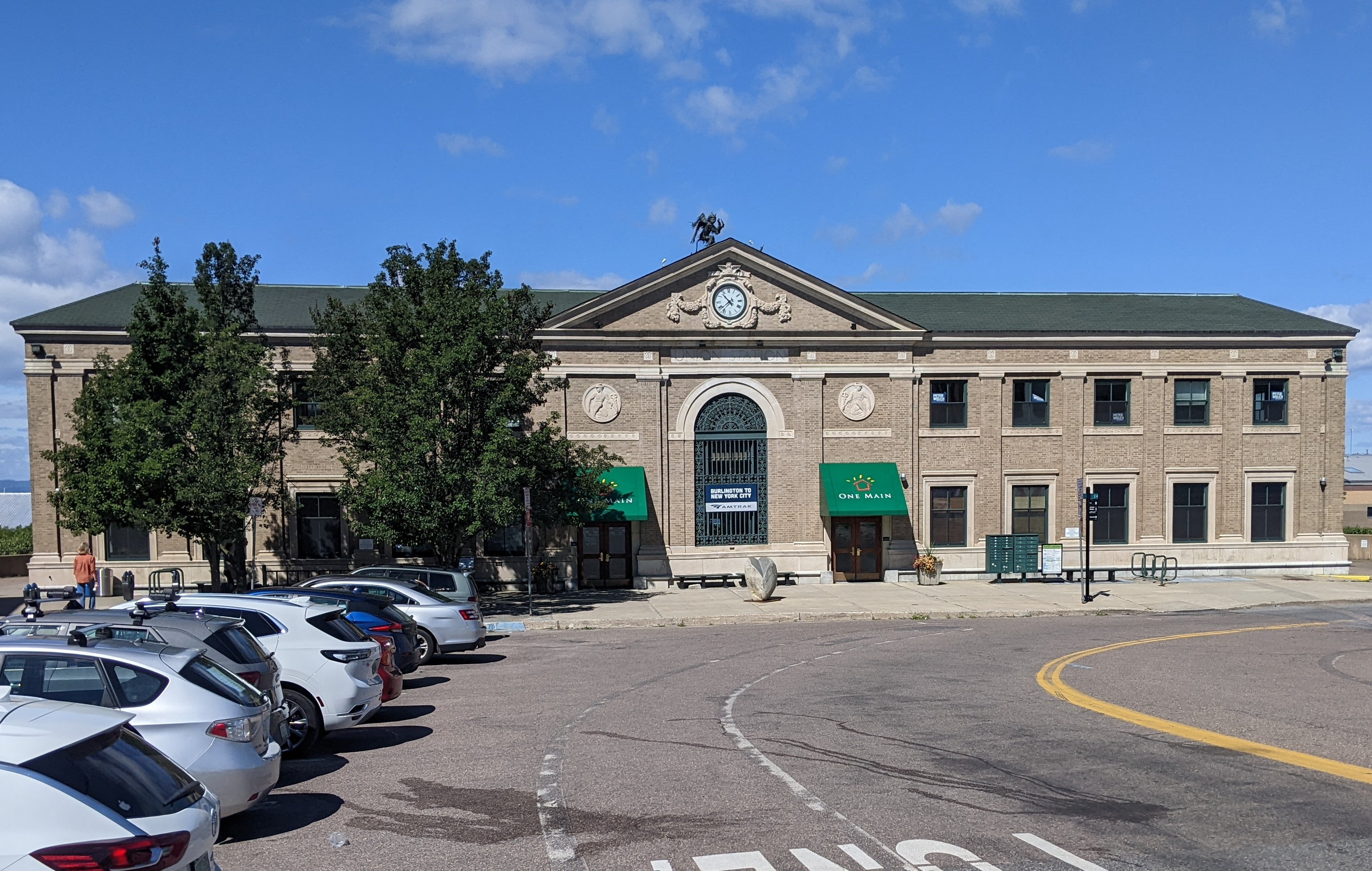
Union Station in Burlington, Vermont, became the northern terminus of the Ethan Allen Express in July 2022.

Even before service began, state planners intended to later extend the Ethan Allen Express from Rutland to Burlington. In 2005, Senator Jim Jeffords obtained a $30 million earmark for upgrades to the Rutland–Burlington rail corridor in preparation for a possible Ethan Allen Express extension. Jeffords had long championed passenger rail in western Vermont, which does not have an interstate highway. His original goal was New York–Burlington service via Bennington. The Vermont Agency of Transportation (VTrans) applied three times for American Recovery and Reinvestment Act of 2009 funds to rebuild the tracks between Rutland and Burlington; none of the applications were successful.

The state received $9 million in Transportation Investment Generating Economic Recovery funds for the project in 2013, and an additional $10 million in 2015. This completed funding for the $26 million project, which included rebuilding 20 miles (32 km) of track to allow speeds of 40 mph (64 km/h) for freight and 60 mph (97 km/h) for passenger trains between Rutland and Burlington. Other work included the construction of stations at Middlebury and Ferrisburgh–Vergennes, a new platform at Burlington Union Station, adding crossovers and passing sidings, improving grade crossings, and rebuilding a wye at Rutland. The former New Haven Junction station building was relocated, as it was too close to the tracks. A separately-funded project constructed a rail tunnel in downtown Middlebury to replace aging bridges and increase clearances for freight use.

VTrans originally planned for trains to lay over overnight at Union Station, but nearby residents objected to having the locomotive idle there. In March 2020, VTrans indicated that the Vermont Railway yard to the south would instead be modified to accommodate the train. The two new stations and the new Burlington platform were built in 2020–2022. In October 2021, Amtrak and Vermont Rail System began running qualification trips between Rutland and Burlington to familiarize train crews with the new route.

Revenue service to Burlington began on July 29, 2022, with trains departing early afternoon northbound and late morning southbound all days. It was the first direct passenger rail service to Burlington in 69 years. The first day of service was marred by a temporary suspension of all Amtrak service west of Albany caused by a deteriorating trackside structure, the Central Warehouse, in North Albany. Passengers were bussed between Saratoga Springs and Albany–Rensselaer. The extension caused an immediate increase in ridership, with August 2022 ridership about 50% higher than August 2019. Ridership in Fiscal Year 2023 – the first full fiscal year of Burlington service – was 86,638, exceeding the pre-pandemic FY 2019 figure of 50,515.

=== Future ===
VTrans listed several possible improvements to the Ethan Allen Express in the 2021 Vermont Rail Plan. These included potential infill flag stops in Brandon and Shelburne. Positive train control and track upgrades would allow the Ethan Allen Express to reach speeds of 79 mph (127 km/h), up from 59 mph (95 km/h), on sections between Whitehall and Burlington. This would save about 15 minutes per trip, with an estimated increase of 1,400 to 2,600 annual riders by 2040. VTrans also analyzed a possible 7.8 mi (12.6 km) extension of the Ethan Allen Express from Burlington to Essex Junction via the New England Central Railroad Winooski Branch, where transfer could be made with the Vermonter. The branch would first have to be upgraded to increase its current passenger train speed limit of 15 mph (24 km/h). This would attract between 4,900 and 7,800 additional riders per year by 2040 (assuming the Vermonter is extended to Montreal).

In 2014, VTrans and the New York State Department of Transportation studied the potential serving southwestern Vermont either with a second daily train or rerouting the Ethan Allen Express. The proposed alternative was to extend an Empire Service train to Rutland, operating on a more southern route than the Ethan Allen Express between Glenville, New York and Rutland. It would use existing Canadian Pacific Railway (now Canadian Pacific Kansas City), Pan Am Railways (now CSX Transportation), and Vermont Railway freight lines, with new intermediate stops at Mechanicville, New York, North Bennington, Vermont, and Manchester, Vermont. The 2021 Vermont Rail Plan indicated that should it be implemented, this second service would also extend to Burlington.

In December 2023, the Federal Railroad Administration accepted an application by VTrans to enter the New York–Albany–Mechanicville–Bennington–Rutland–Burlington route into its Corridor Identification and Development Program. The program grants $500,000 toward service planning and prioritizes the route for future federal funding. The application referred to the route as the Green Mountain Corridor.

== Station stops ==
State	Location	Miles (km)	Station	Connections
VT
VT	Burlington	0	Burlington	Green Mountain Transit
VT	Ferrisburgh	21 (34)	Ferrisburgh–Vergennes	Tri-Valley Transit, Vermont Translines
VT	Middlebury	34 (55)	Middlebury	Tri-Valley Transit
VT	Rutland	67 (108)	Rutland	MVRTD "The Bus"
VT	Castleton	78 (125)	Castleton	MVRTD "The Bus"
VT	Fair Haven	82 (133)	Fair Haven	Closed January 9, 2010
NY	Fort Edward	113 (182)	Fort Edward–Glens Falls	Amtrak: Adirondack; Capital District Transportation Authority
NY	Saratoga Springs	131 (211)	Saratoga Springs	Amtrak: Adirondack; Capital District Transportation Authority
NY	Schenectady	151 (243)	Schenectady	Amtrak: Adirondack, Empire Service, Lake Shore Limited, Maple Leaf; Capital District Transportation Authority
NY	Rensselaer	169 (272)	Albany–Rensselaer	Amtrak: Adirondack, Berkshire Flyer, Empire Service, Lake Shore Limited, Maple Leaf; Capital District Transportation Authority; Vermont Translines, Megabus
NY	Hudson	196 (316)	Hudson	Amtrak: Adirondack, Berkshire Flyer, Empire Service, Maple Leaf; Columbia County Public Transportation
NY	Rhinecliff	222 (357)	Rhinecliff	Amtrak: Adirondack, Berkshire Flyer, Empire Service, Lake Shore Limited, Maple Leaf
NY	Poughkeepsie	237 (382)	Poughkeepsie	Amtrak: Adirondack, Berkshire Flyer, Empire Service, Lake Shore Limited, Maple Leaf; Metro-North Railroad: ■ Hudson Line; Ulster County Area Transit, Dutchess County Public Transit
NY	Croton-on-Hudson	278 (447)	Croton–Harmon	Amtrak: Adirondack, Berkshire Flyer, Empire Service, Lake Shore Limited, Maple Leaf; Metro-North Railroad: ■ Hudson Line; Bee-Line
NY	Yonkers	296 (476)	Yonkers	Amtrak: Adirondack, Berkshire Flyer, Empire Service, Maple Leaf; Metro-North Railroad: ■ Hudson Line; Bee-Line
NY	New York City	310 (499)	New York Penn Station	Amtrak (long-distance): Cardinal, Crescent, Lake Shore Limited, Palmetto, Silver Meteor; Amtrak (intercity): Acela, Adirondack, Berkshire Flyer, Carolinian, Empire Service, Keystone Service, Maple Leaf, Northeast Regional, Pennsylvanian, Vermonter; LIRR: ■ City Terminal Zone, ■ Port Washington Branch; NJ Transit: ■ North Jersey Coast Line, ■ Northeast Corridor Line, ■ Gladstone Branch, ■ Montclair–Boonton Line, ■ Morristown Line; NYC Subway: PATH: HOB-33 JSQ-33 JSQ-33 (via HOB); NYC Transit Bus
