= New Haven Junction station =

Railway station at United States

New Haven Junction
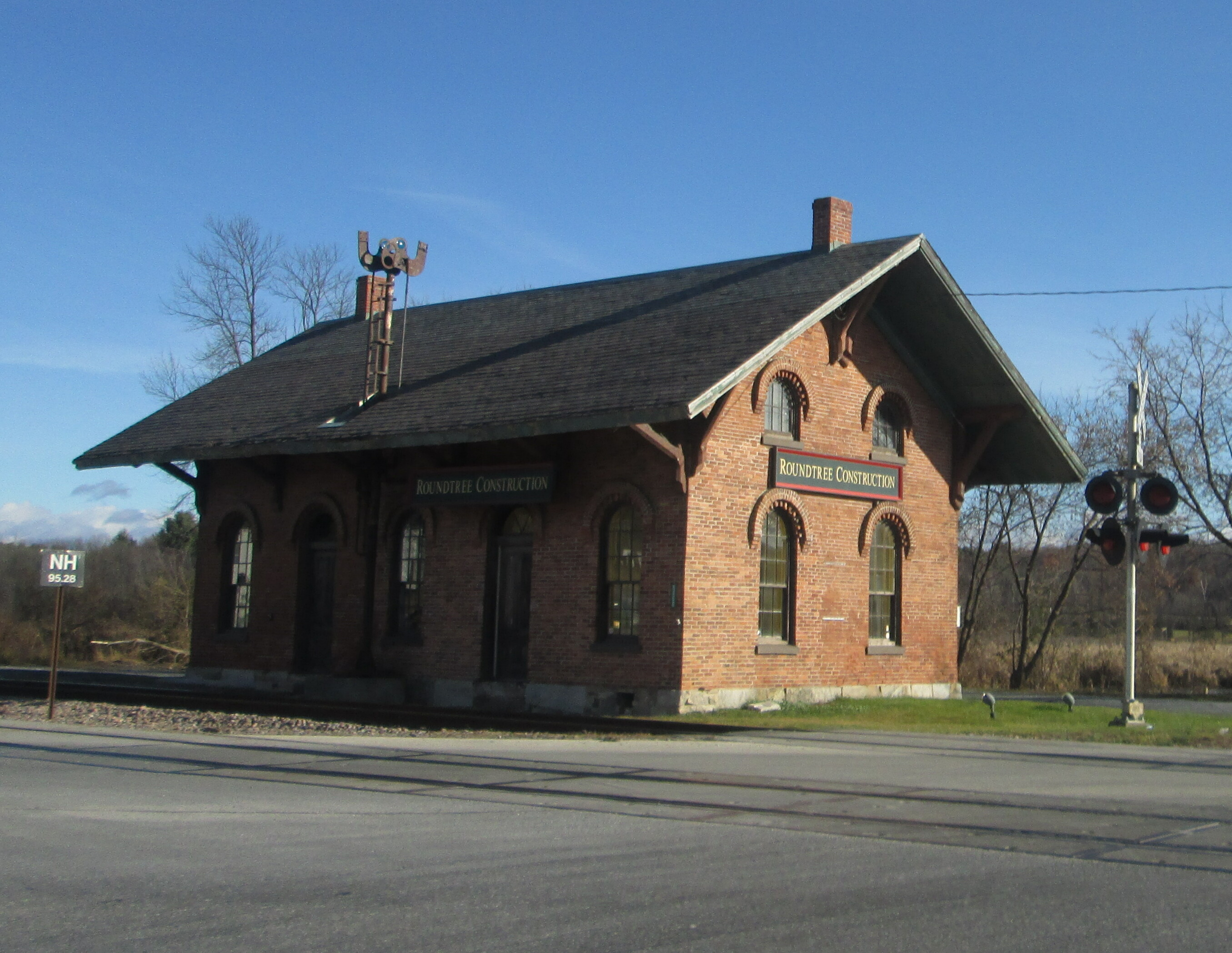
- New Haven Junction station building in 2013

History
- Opened: 1849
- Closed: 1953

Former services
Preceding station	Rutland Railroad	Following station
Vergennes toward Rouses Point	Main Line	Beldens toward North Bennington or Bellows Falls
Vergennes toward Montreal	Green Mountain Flyer / Mount Royal	Middlebury toward New York or Boston
- New Haven Junction Depot
- U.S. National Register of Historic Places
- Coordinates: 44°7′36″N 73°9′14″W
- Built: 1855
- Built by: Rutland and Burlington Railroad
- NRHP reference No.: 78000226
- Added to NRHP: October 19, 1978
Location

New Haven Junction station is a former railway station at the junction of United States Route 7 and Vermont Route 17 in New Haven, Vermont. Probably built in the 1850s, it is a well-preserved example of a first-generation railroad depot. It was listed on the National Register of Historic Places in 1978 as New Haven Junction Depot, and now houses offices.

== Description and history ==
The former station originally stood adjacent to railroad tracks just north of the western junction of US 7 and Vermont 17 in the village of New Haven Junction. It is a single-story brick building with a gabled roof. It has Italianate styling, including rounded-arch windows and extended eaves supported by large brackets. The track-facing facade has two entrances, located in the second and fourth of five bays. An original manual semaphore control tower rises through the eave near the center of that facade.

The station's exact construction date is not known, and is assumed to be in the decade following the 1849 introduction of railroad service to the area by the Rutland and Burlington Railroad. The station was first listed as a stop in that railroad's timetables in 1854, and the current brick station was completed during August 1868, replacing a wooden structure across the tracks (which became the freighthouse). The railroad was in the second half of the 19th century an important transportation artery for both the Burlington area's lumber industry, and the Rutland area's marble quarries. The station became a junction in 1891 when the Bristol Railroad opened.

The building underwent restoration in the late 1970s. In the 21st century, it was determined that the building needed to be moved or demolished to accommodate the Amtrak Ethan Allen Express extension to Burlington, as the structure was too close to the tracks to permit trains to run at 59 miles per hour (95 km/h). The town selectboard chose a new site for the building, adjacent to the town office and library, in May 2021. Moving the station was expected to cost more than $600,000. The town has applied for state and regional funding to move the structure. The Vermont Department of Historic Preservation transferred ownership to the town in December 2020. The building was moved to a city-owned lot on January 12, 2022, with a new foundation to be poured that spring.

== See also ==
- National Register of Historic Places listings in Addison County, Vermont
