= Fair Haven station =

Train station in Fair Haven, Vermont, US

Fair Haven, VT
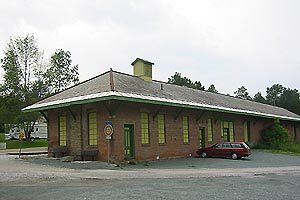
- Fair Haven station in July 2006

General information
- Location: Depot Street; Fair Haven, Vermont; United States
- Coordinates: 43°35′25″N 73°15′41″W
- Line: VRS Whitehall Branch
- Platforms: 1 side platform
- Tracks: 1

History
- Opened: November 12, 1997
- Closed: January 9, 2010

Passengers
- FY2007: 2,205

Former services
| Preceding station | Amtrak | Following station |
|---|---|---|
| Rutland Terminus | Ethan Allen Express | Fort Edward toward New York |
| Preceding station | Delaware and Hudson Railway | Following station |
| Hydeville toward Rutland | Whitehall – Rutland | Whitehall Terminus |
Location

Fair Haven station was an Amtrak intercity train station in Fair Haven, Vermont. It opened in November 1997, and was closed and replaced by nearby Castleton station in January 2010.

== History ==
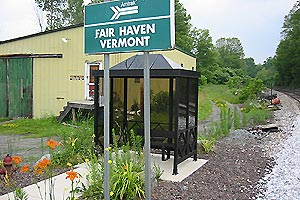
Amtrak used a small shelter near the abandoned station building

The Ethan Allen Express began service between New York City's Penn Station and Rutland on December 2, 1996. It was the first passenger service on the line between Whitehall and Rutland since 1934. An infill station was opened at Fair Haven on November 12, 1997.

The station building, originally built by the Delaware and Hudson Railway, was in poor condition and was not available for passenger use. Instead, Amtrak passengers used a small bus shelter located across the street from the building.

Fair Haven is a small town with limited tourist activity; in fiscal year 2007 the station served just 2,205 passengers. In January 2010, Fair Haven station was replaced with Castleton station, 5 miles (8.0 km) to the east, which better serves Castleton University and Lake Bomoseen. Castleton station opened on January 2; Fair Haven remained in use until January 9.
