= Bennington station =

Historic former railroad depot in Vermont

Bennington
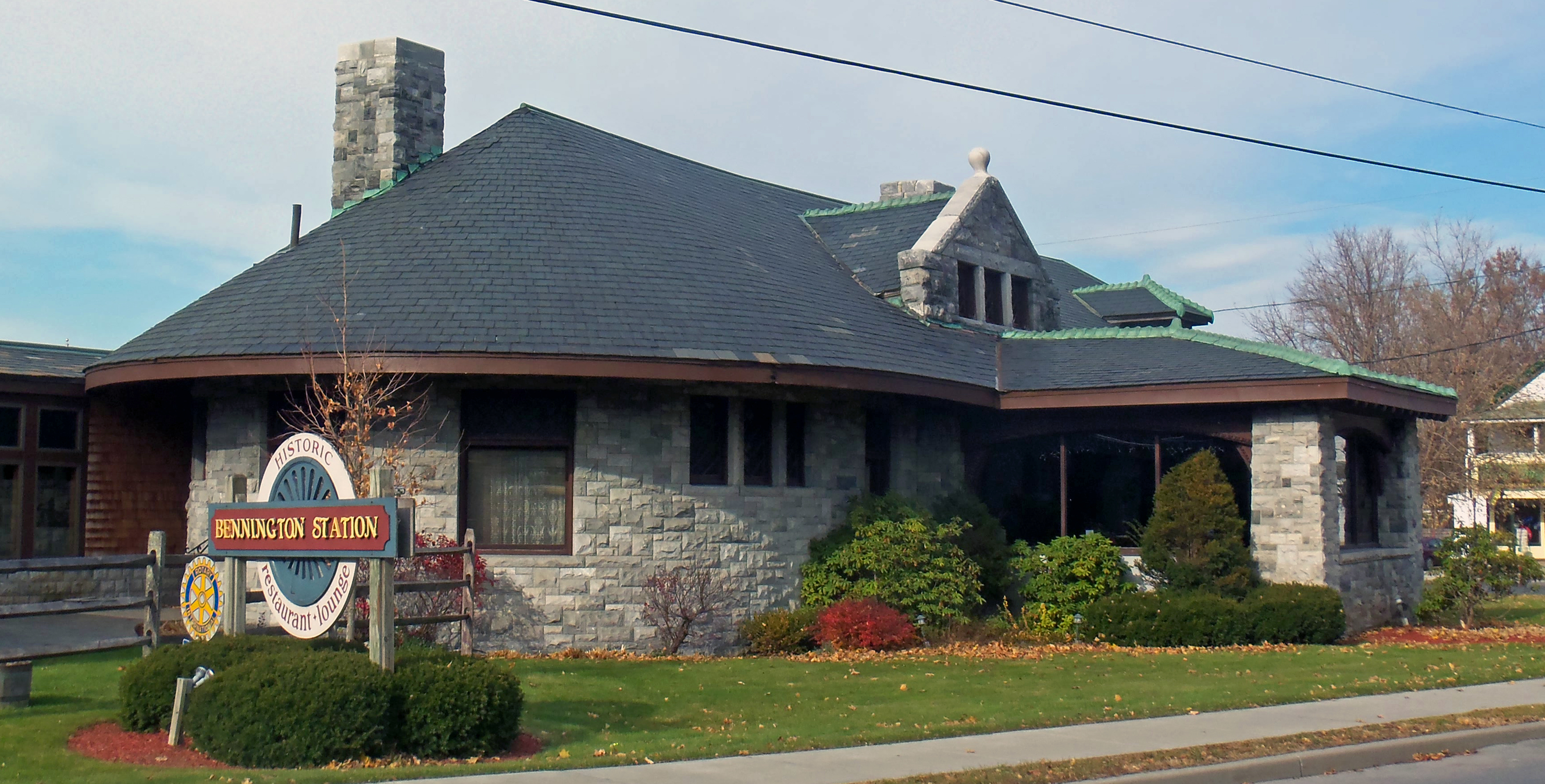
- Bennington station building in 2011

General information
- Location: 150 Depot Street, Bennington, Vermont

History
- Closed: 1953
- Rebuilt: 1897

Former services
| Preceding station | Rutland Railroad | Following station |
|---|---|---|
| North Bennington Terminus | Bennington–North Bennington | Terminus |
| Anthony toward Chatham | Chatham Branch | Terminus |
- Bennington Railroad Station
- U.S. National Register of Historic Places
- Coordinates: 42°52′54″N 73°11′58″W
- Area: 0.4 acres (0.16 ha)
- Built: 1897
- Architect: Bull, William C.
- Architectural style: Romanesque, Richardsonian Romanesque
- NRHP reference No.: 88001301
- Added to NRHP: November 9, 1988
Location

Bennington station is a historic former railroad depot at 150 Depot Street in downtown Bennington, Vermont. Built in 1897-98 by the Bennington and Rutland Railroad, it is the only Richardsonian Romanesque railroad station in the state of Vermont. It was listed on the National Register of Historic Places in 1988 as Bennington Railroad Station, and since then housed a restaurant, which closed in 2018. It now is an office space for MSK Engineering and Design and Goldstone Architecture.

== Description and history ==
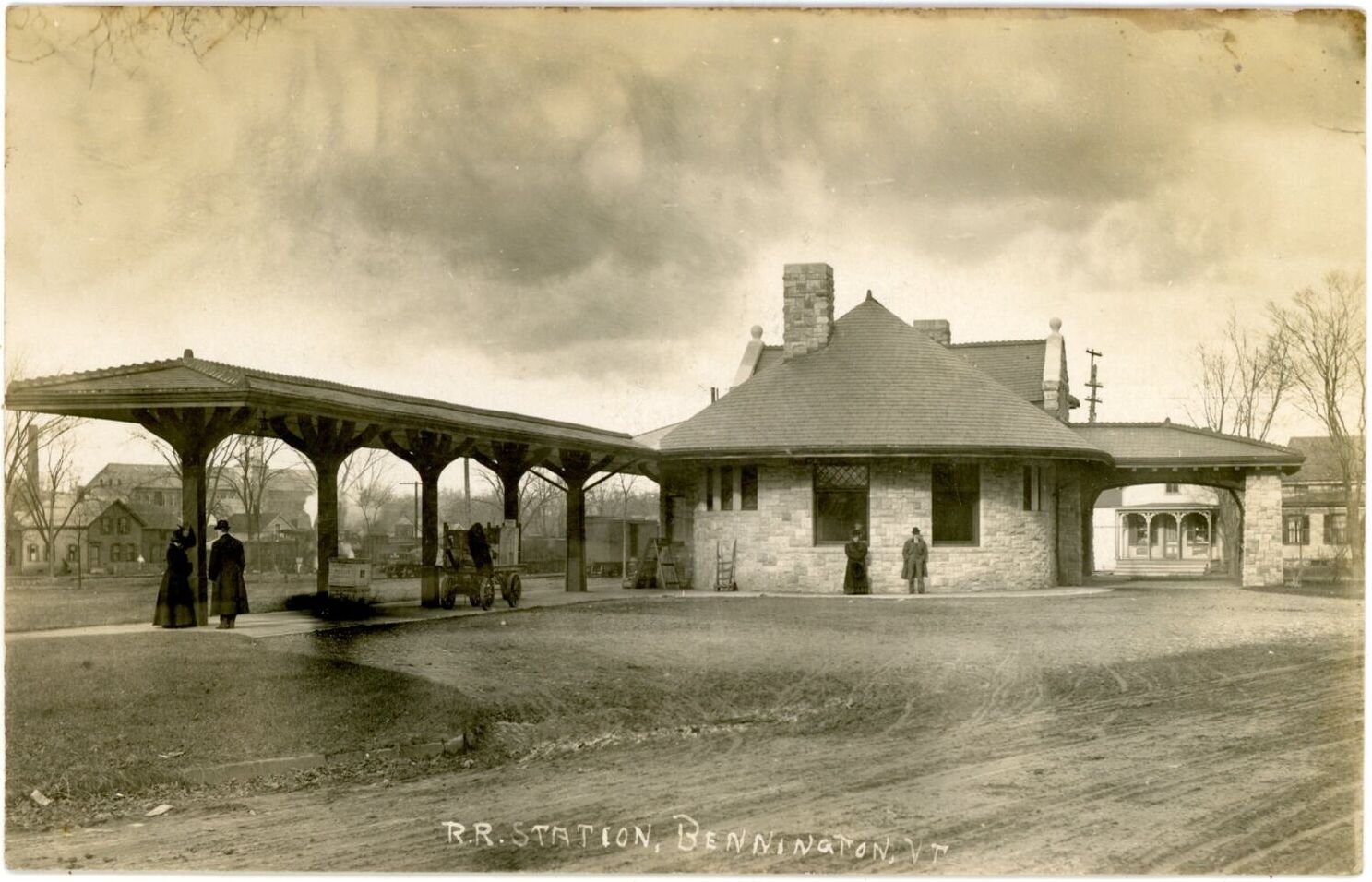
1907 postcard of the station

The former station stands just northwest of Bennington's downtown, at the southwest corner of Depot and River Streets. The building is oriented at an angle to the intersection, paralleling the former route of the tracks, which formed a triangle with the two roads. It is a rectangular single-story stone structure, with an apse at its southern end, and a projecting rectangular entry section (formerly a porte-cochere) on the longer easterly facade. Unused railroad tracks lie just to the west, and a modern addition extends to the south, providing additional restaurant seating capacity. The former agent's office projects on the track side of the building.

Bennington's early railroad service was limited to the village of North Bennington, about 5 miles (8.0 km) north of the downtown. In 1854 a branch line was run from North Bennington to serve the town center, and a wood frame depot was erected by the Bennington and Rutland. In 1897, its depot in decline, the railroad commissioned local architect William C. Bull to design a replacement. The present building was completed the following year. Its design bears significant resemblance to the station designed by H.H. Richardson for Wellesley, Massachusetts (now demolished), and is the state's only instance of a Richardsonian railroad station.

Passenger service to downtown Bennington was discontinued in the early 1930s, and it is not known how long freight service continued. The station building was sold into private hands in 1966, and it was converted into a restaurant in 1970. The modern extensions to the south were made in 1986. The restaurant closed in 2018.

== See also ==
- National Register of Historic Places listings in Bennington County, Vermont
