= Fair Haven Green Historic District =

Historic district in Vermont, United States

- U.S. National Register of Historic Places
- U.S. Historic district
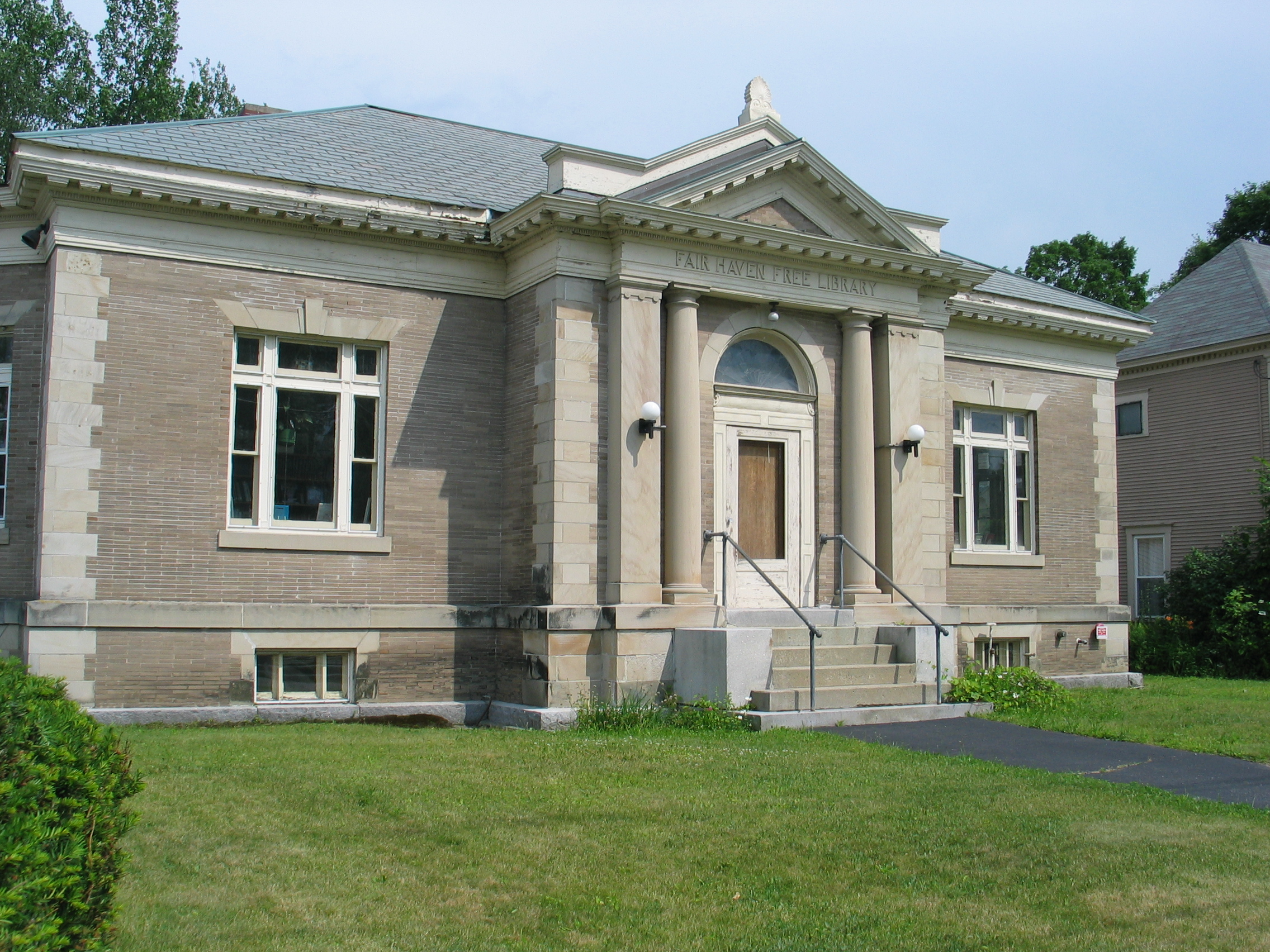
- Fair Haven Public Library

- Location within Vermont Location within the United States
- Location: Park Pl., Adams and Main Sts., Fair Haven, Vermont
- Coordinates: 43°35′35″N 73°15′57″W
- Area: 24 acres (9.7 ha)
- Architect: Multiple
- Architectural style: Greek Revival, Italianate
- NRHP reference No.: 80000339
- Added to NRHP: November 24, 1980

The Fair Haven Green Historic District encompasses the village green of Fair Haven, Vermont, and the heterogeneous collection of civic, commercial, and residential buildings that line it and adjacent streets. The area was developed mainly following the arrival of the railroad in 1848 and the subsequent expansion of marble and slate quarries in the area. The district was listed on the National Register of Historic Places in 1980.

== Description and history ==
The town of Fair Haven is located in western Rutland County, Vermont, on the border with New York. Its town center is located on the north side of the Castleton River. The town green is roughly oval in shape, and is a grassy area dotted with shade trees. It is bounded by Main Street and Park Place, and historically significant roadways radiate away to the north, east, and south. The streets flanking the green are lined with a combination of civic, residential, and commercial buildings, most dating to the second half of the 19th century and the early decades of the 20th. A cluster of brick commercial buildings extend along Main Street just south of the green, and are also included in the historic district.

The town was chartered in 1779 and settled in 1783 by Matthew Lyon, who established the town's first mills, and gave the land that now forms the green. The town was rural and generally agrarian in character until 1848, when the Rutland and Whitehall Railroad was built through the town on the south side of the Castleton River. The marble cutting industry was subsequently a major influence in the development of the town, and is partially exemplified by the presence of two marble houses facing the green. Prominent civic buildings facing the green including the neoclassical public library building (1906), the Gothic Methodist church (1877), ornate with slate roof and trim, and the Romanesque Baptist church (1870–73). Many of the residences and commercial buildings are Italianate in style.

== See also ==
- National Register of Historic Places listings in Rutland County, Vermont
