= Murfee =

Dog; mayor of Fair Haven, Vermont, US

Mayor of Fair Haven, Vermont
- In office March 3, 2020 – 2021
- Preceded by: Lincoln the goat

Personal details
- Born: Murfee; August 15, 2016 (age 9) Salem, Oregon, U.S.
- Website: murfee.org

Murfee (born August 15, 2016) is a male Cavalier King Charles Spaniel and was the second animal to be elected to the honorary office of mayor in the town of Fair Haven, Vermont, on March 3, 2020. Murfee was born in Oregon in 2016 and was bought by his current owners, Linda and Ray Barker of Fair Haven, Vermont, that year. In the fall of 2017, Murfee became a certified therapy dog. He has also earned AKC titles as a Therapy Dog and Canine Good Citizen. He was re-elected for a second term on March 3, 2021.

== Work as a therapy dog ==
Immediately following his certification as a therapy dog in 2017, Murfee worked with Caring Canines Therapy Dogs of Southern Vermont, Inc., where his owner, Linda Barker, is president. This included visits to hospitals, residential and outpatient care facilities, schools, colleges and universities throughout southern Vermont. According to his website, he estimates he spends roughly 10 hours a week doing such work.

== 2020 mayoral race and publicity ==
On January 31, 2020, Murfee's candidacy was announced on the Fair Haven Police Department Facebook page. The next day, the story was picked up at a national level by CNN which ran the first national story covering the election. His public profile grew over the next month with articles published outside the United States on Index.hr in Croatia and Notícias ao Minuto in Portugal.

After Murfee was elected mayor, national level publicity intensified with segments airing on The Late Show with Stephen Colbert and The Today Show. Numerous articles ran nationwide and internationally, including an appearance in the June 29, 2020 issue of People.

== Mayoral term and goals ==
The purpose of the honorary mayoral office is to raise funds for a playground in the town of Fair Haven. To that end, Murfee has a website, a GoFundMe page and a Facebook account. Additionally, during the COVID-19 pandemic, Murfee has taken donations for hundreds of handmade face-masks. On January 8, 2021, it was announced that the playground had been successfully funded and that Murfee would turn his attention to fundraising for the construction of a dog park in the town.
