= Fort Edward station =

Intercity train station in Fort Edward, New York

Fort Edward, NY
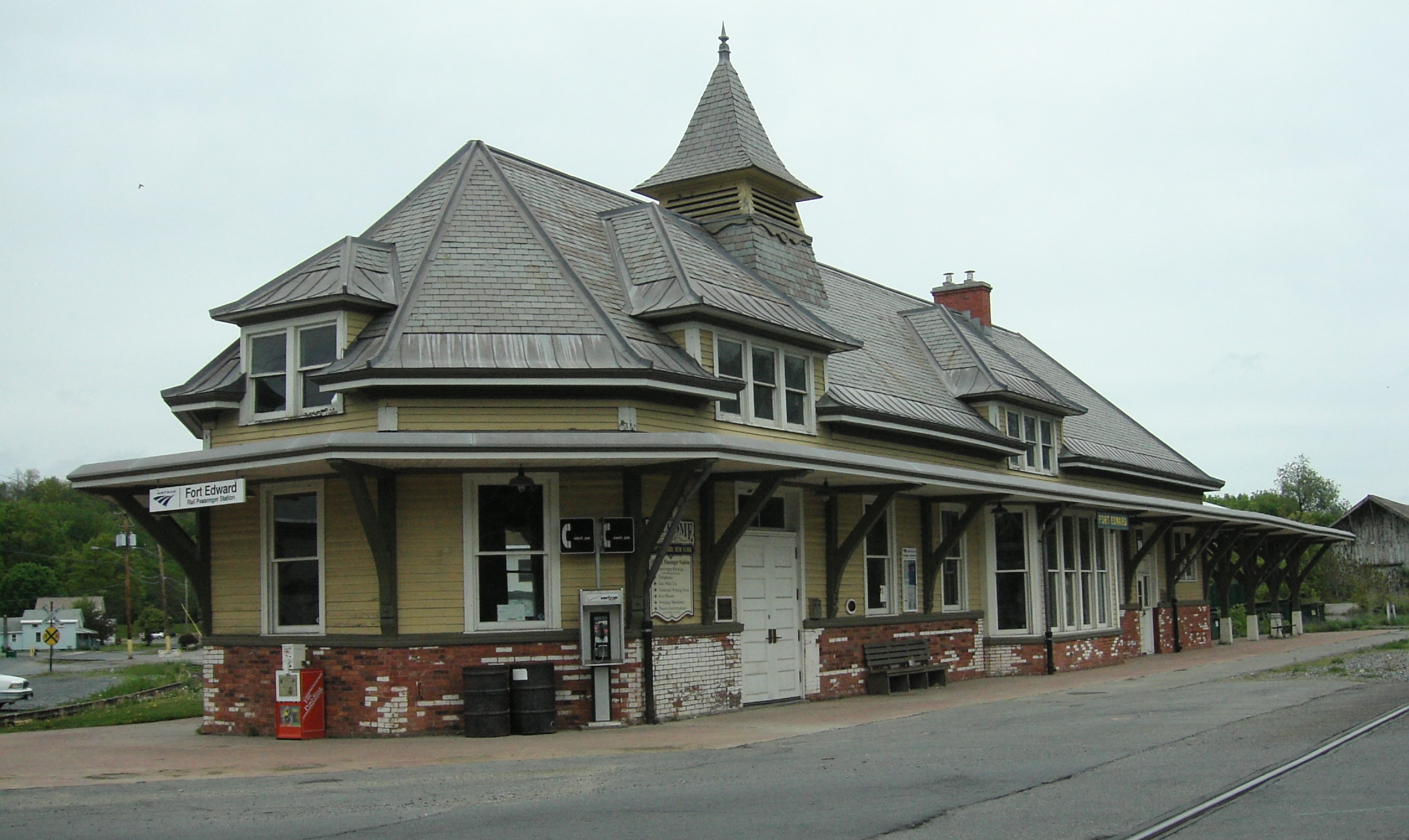
- Ford Edward–Glens Falls station, circa 2008

General information
- Location: 71 East Street; Fort Edward, New York; United States
- Coordinates: 43°16′11″N 73°34′49.5″W
- Owner: Fort Edward Local Development Corporation
- Line: Canadian Subdivision
- Platforms: 1 side platform
- Tracks: 1
- Connections: CDTA Bus

Construction
- Parking: Yes
- Accessible: Yes

Other information
- Station code: Amtrak: FED

History
- Opened: 1900

Key dates
- April 30, 1971: Delaware and Hudson Railroad service ends
- August 6, 1974: Amtrak service begins
- October 30, 1983: Station agent eliminated

Passengers
- FY 2025: 8,590 (Amtrak)

Services
Preceding station	Amtrak	Following station
Whitehall toward Montreal	Adirondack	Saratoga Springs toward New York
Castleton toward Burlington	Ethan Allen Express	Saratoga Springs toward New York
Former services
Preceding station	Amtrak	Following station
Fair Haven (1997–2010) toward Burlington	Ethan Allen Express	Saratoga Springs toward New York
Preceding station	Delaware and Hudson Railway	Following station
Smith's Basin toward Rouses Point	Main Line	Gansevoort toward Albany
Hudson Falls toward Lake George	Lake George Branch	Terminus
- Fort Edward D&H Train Station
- U.S. National Register of Historic Places
- Architect: Delaware & Hudson Railroad
- Architectural style: Late Victorian
- NRHP reference No.: 00001527
- Added to NRHP: December 13, 2000
Location

Fort Edward station (also known as the Fort Edward–Glens Falls) is an intercity train station in Fort Edward, New York. It was originally built as a Delaware and Hudson Railroad depot in 1900, as a replacement for two earlier stations. The first was built in 1840 but was later converted into a store in 1880, the same year it was replaced with a second depot on the existing site. The third and current station has been listed on the National Register of Historic Places since December 13, 2000. The station serves both Fort Edward and nearby Glens Falls. It has one low-level side platform to the west of the single track of the Canadian Pacific Railway Canadian Subdivision.

The station is served by Amtrak's daily Adirondack and Ethan Allen Express. The station also is a stop on the CDTA's Route 404 providing bus service to Glens Falls and surrounding communities Monday through Saturdays, as well as seasonal "train-catcher" service to Lake George, New York.

In March 2020, all Amtrak service at the station was suspended indefinitely, with trains being truncated to Albany–Rensselaer station after Vermont Governor Phil Scott ordered all Amtrak stations in Vermont closed due to the ongoing coronavirus pandemic.Ethan Allen Express service between New York City and Rutland, Vermont resumed on July 19, 2021. The Adirondack service between New York City and Montreal resumed daily operations on April 3, 2023.

As of June 2020, the station is occupied by Evergreen Bicycle Works.
