= Rutland and Whitehall Railroad =

Defunct railroad in Vermont, United States

Map

The Rutland and Whitehall Railroad is a defunct railroad which operated in the state of Vermont. The railroad, also known as the Castleton Company, received its charter from Vermont in 1848 and opened in 1850.

Its main line ran 6.88 miles (11.07 km) from Castleton, Vermont to Fair Haven, Vermont, which lay on the New York border. It also operated a 1.51-mile (2.43 km) branch line from west of Castleton north along Lake Bomoseen which served local slate quarries. At the eastern end of its line it connected to the Rutland and Washington Railroad; on the western side the Saratoga and Whitehall Railroad, a New York company. The Saratoga and Whitehall leased the Rutland and Whitehall on its completion in 1850. From March 14, 1865 the Rensselaer and Saratoga Railroad leased both companies and operated them together. The Delaware and Hudson Company, which already controlled the Rensselaer and Saratoga, took over operation of the Rutland and Whitehall on May 1, 1871 and the lease of the line on June 15, 1871.

The Rutland and Whitehall had depots in Fair Haven, Castleton, and Hydeville. The Castleton depot re-opened in 2010 and serves Amtrak's Ethan Allen Express.
