= Delaware and Hudson Rail Trail =

Rail trail in Vermont, United States

D & H Rail Trail
- Location within Vermont
- Interactive map of D & H Rail Trail
- Location: Castleton, West Pawlet, Poultney and Rupert, Vermont, United States
- Coordinates: 43.5509°N 73.2289°W
- Area: 19.8-mile (31.9 km)
- Administrator: Vermont Department of Forests, Parks, and Recreation
- Website: Official website
- Vermont State Parks

The Delaware and Hudson Rail Trail is a 19.8-mile (31.9 km) rail trail built along an abandoned Delaware & Hudson Railway (D&H) corridor between West Rupert and Castleton, Vermont. The trail runs in two disconnected segments, separated by a short section that leaves the state for neighboring New York State before returning to Vermont. The trail is a state park and is managed by the Vermont Department of Forests, Parks, and Recreation.

The former corridor was part of the D&H’s Washington Branch, whose trains were locally known as the “Slate Picker.” The line ran from Eagle Bridge, New York, to Castleton, Vermont. In 1980, D&H abandoned the section between Eagle Bridge and Salem, New York, and subsequently sold the railbed to Ron Crowd with funding support from the Urban Development Corporation.

The Poultney-Castleton, Vermont and Rupert, Vermont-Granville, New York segments were sold to the Vermont Agency of Transportation and subsequently converted to the D&H rail trail.

The Salem, New York-West Rupert, Vermont and West Pawlet, Vermont-Granville, New York segments were sold to the New York State Department of Transportation. A rail trail was slated by the state, but were halted at the government level, resulting in several sections reverting to local property owners.
