= Fair Haven, Vermont =

- Town
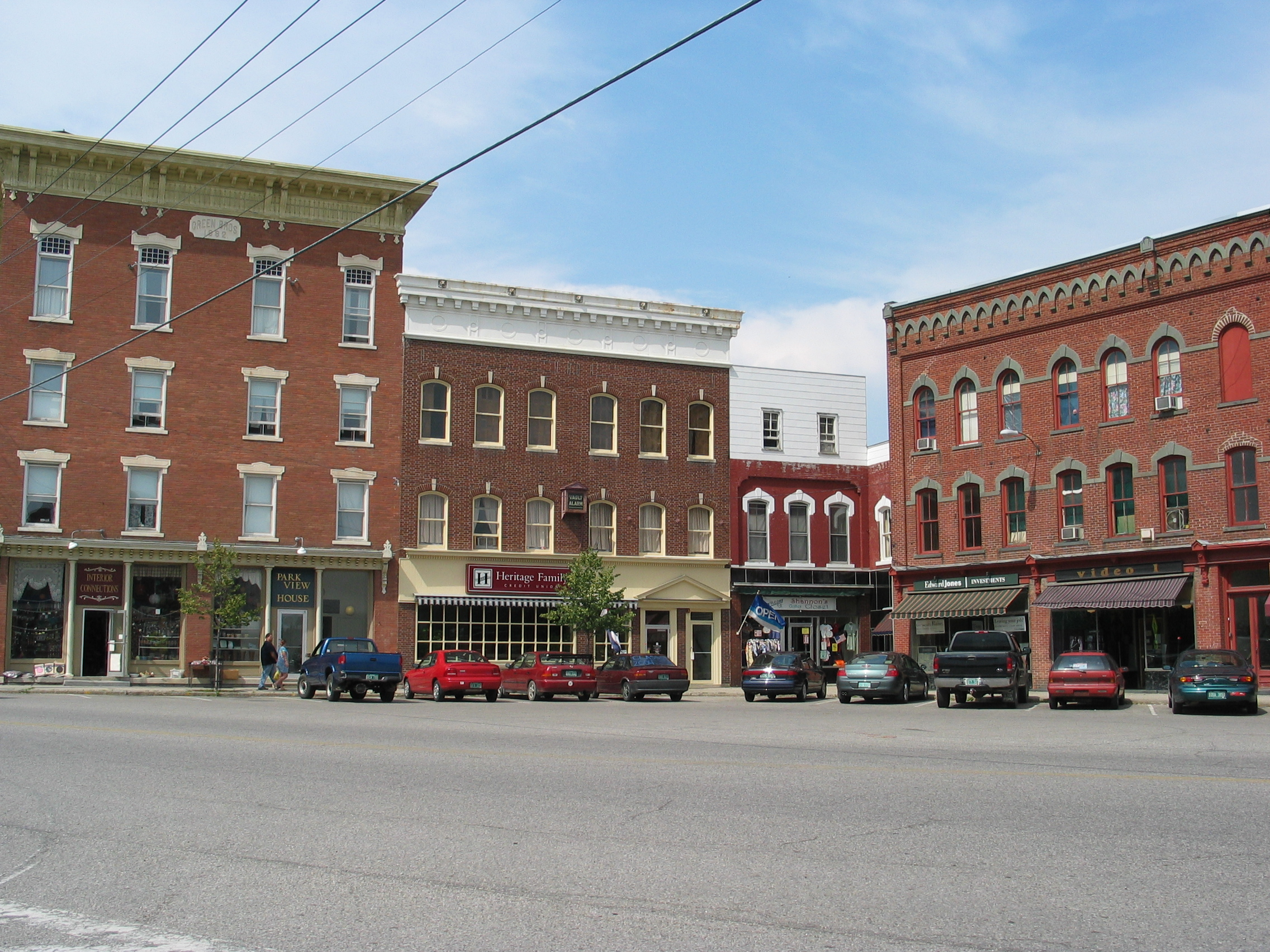
- Main Street

- Seal

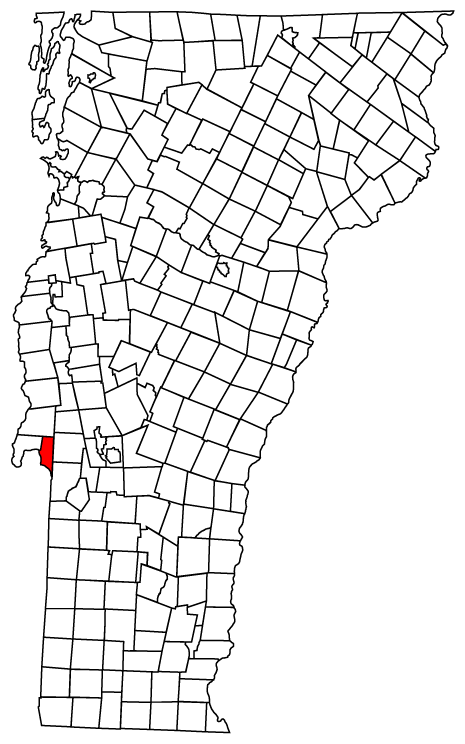
- Located in Rutland County, Vermont
- Coordinates: 43°37′02″N 73°15′46″W
- Country: United States
- State: Vermont
- County: Rutland
- Chartered: 1779
- Communities: Fair Haven

Area
  - Total: 18.147 sq mi (47.00 km^{2})
  - Land: 17.444 sq mi (45.18 km^{2})
  - Water: 0.703 sq mi (1.82 km^{2})
- Elevation: 364 ft (111 m)

Population (2020)
  - Total: 2,736
  - Density: 156.8/sq mi (60.56/km^{2})
  - Households: 1,135
  - Families: 738
- Time zone: UTC−5 (Eastern (EST))
  - Summer (DST): UTC−4 (EDT)
- ZIP code: 05743
- Area code: 802
- GNIS feature ID: 1462094
- Website: https://fairhavenvt.gov/

Fair Haven is a town in Rutland County, Vermont, United States. The population was 2,736 at the 2020 census. Within the town is located the census-designated place of Fair Haven. The town is noted for its late 19th century residential and commercial architecture.

== History ==
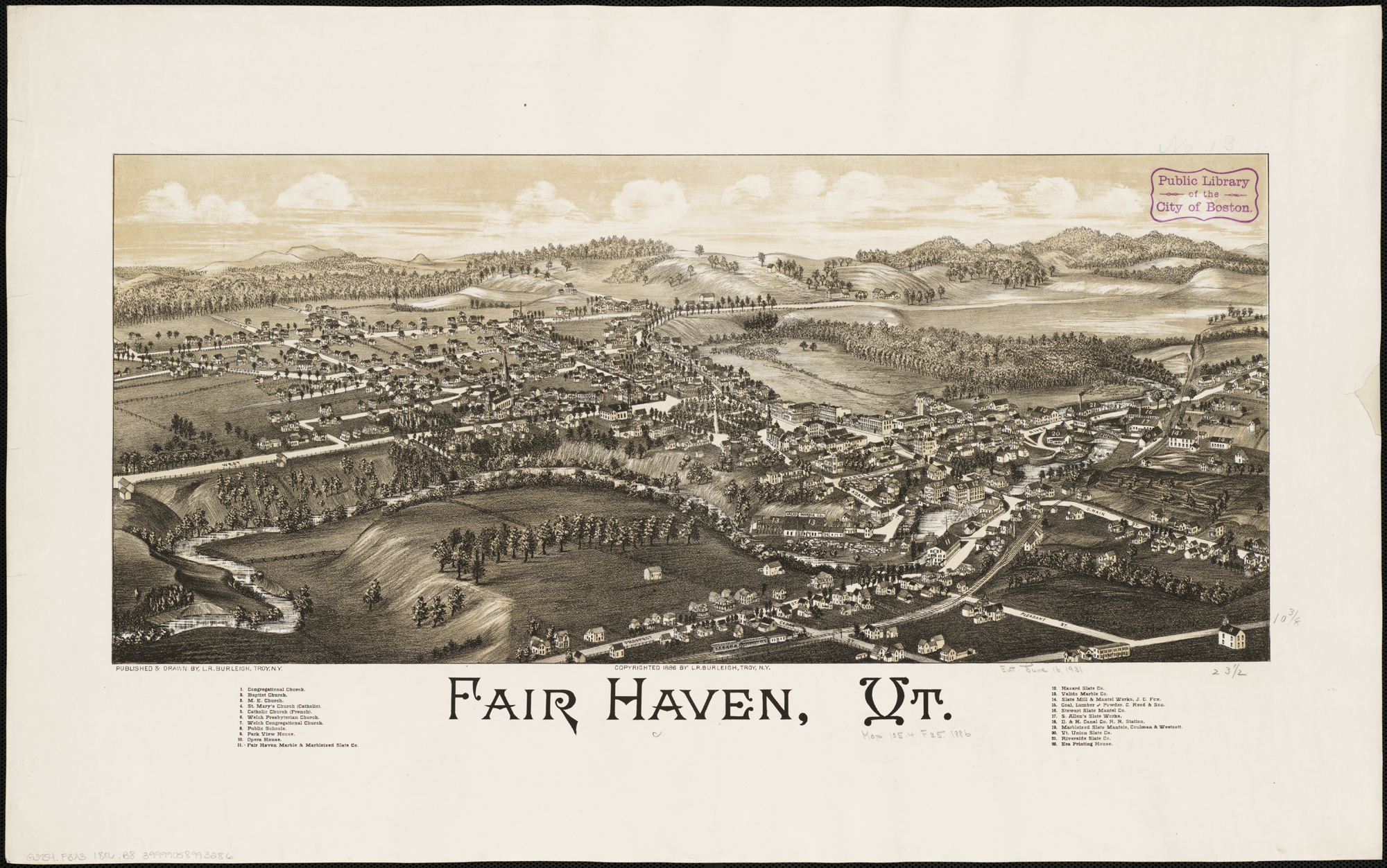
Print of Fair Haven from 1886 by L.R. Burleigh with listing of landmarks

Fair Haven was chartered on October 27, 1779, to Ebenezer Allen and 76 associates, and first settled the same year. The township originally included West Haven, which was set off on October 20, 1792. The post office at Fair Haven was established in 1797. In 1783, Colonel Matthew Lyon moved to Fair Haven and began building mills at the falls on the Castleton River. His enterprises included a gristmill, sawmill and papermill, in addition to a forge, as well as a newspaper, the Fair Haven Gazette. This began Fair Haven's legacy as a small, prosperous mill town, which by 1859 included a marble mill, rolling mill, nail factory, papermill producing wallpaper, three sawmills, a wagon shop, a machine shop, two blacksmith shops, and two shoe shops.

The quarrying and manufacture of slate began in 1846. Fair Haven would develop extensive quarries for the stone, believed at the time to be inexhaustible, which was supplied to cities along the Atlantic coast and in the West. Some of it was made into the framed, book-sized writing slates that students of the time used. On April 7, 1880, a very small area of Fair Haven was transferred to New York due to a change in the course in the Poultney River. The area transferred was west of the "middle of the deepest channel" of the river.

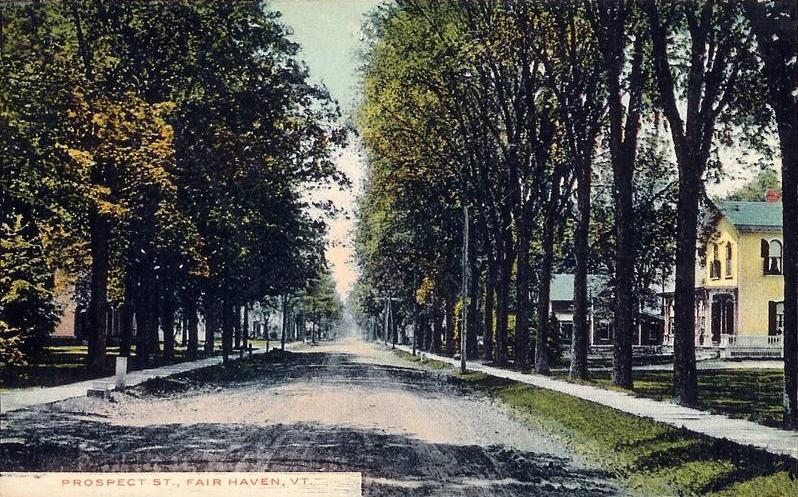
Prospect Street c. 1910

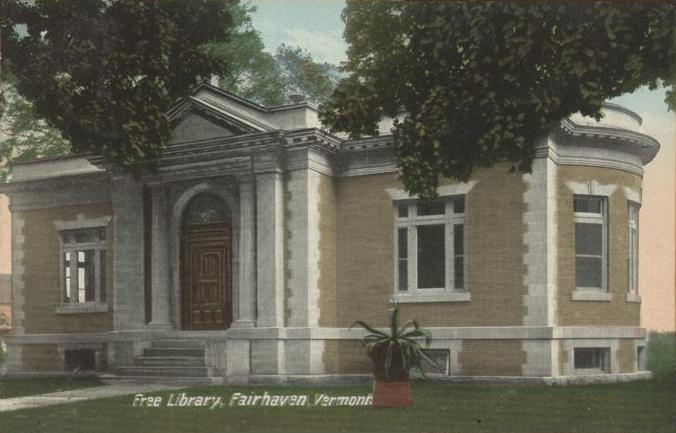
Free Library in 1914

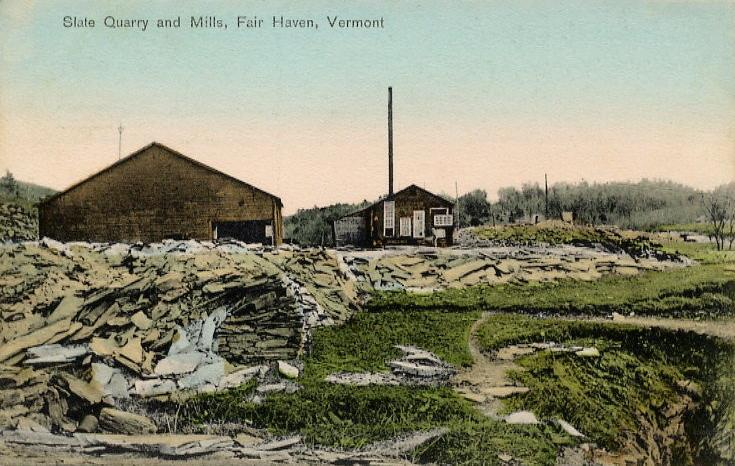
Slate quarry c. 1910

== Demographics ==
Historical population
| Census | Pop. | Note | %± |
|---|---|---|---|
| 1790 | 545 | | — |
| 1800 | 411 | | −24.6% |
| 1810 | 645 | | 56.9% |
| 1820 | 714 | | 10.7% |
| 1830 | 675 | | −5.5% |
| 1840 | 633 | | −6.2% |
| 1850 | 902 | | 42.5% |
| 1860 | 1,378 | | 52.8% |
| 1870 | 2,208 | | 60.2% |
| 1880 | 2,211 | | 0.1% |
| 1890 | 2,791 | | 26.2% |
| 1900 | 2,999 | | 7.5% |
| 1910 | 3,095 | | 3.2% |
| 1920 | 2,540 | | −17.9% |
| 1930 | 2,614 | | 2.9% |
| 1940 | 2,245 | | −14.1% |
| 1950 | 2,286 | | 1.8% |
| 1960 | 2,378 | | 4.0% |
| 1970 | 2,777 | | 16.8% |
| 1980 | 2,819 | | 1.5% |
| 1990 | 2,887 | | 2.4% |
| 2000 | 2,928 | | 1.4% |
| 2010 | 2,734 | | −6.6% |
| 2020 | 2,736 | | 0.1% |
U.S. Decennial Census

As of the census of 2010, there were 2,734 people and 1,135 households. The population density was 150 people per square mile. The racial makeup of the town was 97.3% White (2,659 people), 0.3% Black or African American (9 people), 0.2% Native American (5 people), 0.4% Asian (12 people), <0.1% Pacific Islander (1 person), 0.5% from other races (14 people), and 1.2% from two or more races (34 people). Hispanic or Latino of any race were 1.3% (36 people).

Of the 1,282 total housing units, 1,135 (88.5%) of the houses were occupied and 147 (11.5%) were vacant. Of the occupied housing units, 755 (66.5%) were occupied by the owners (1,928 people), and 380 (33.5%) were rented (806 people). Of the 147 vacant housing units, 19 (12.9%) were for sale and 78 (53.1%) were for rent. The average number people per household was 2.41.

In the town, the population was spread out, with 1,320 (48.3%) males and 1,414 (51.7%) females. Out of the total population, there were 598 people under the age of 18 (21.9%), 193 (7.1%) between the ages 20–24, 265 (9.7%) within the ages of 25–34, 558 (20.41%) people who are between 35–49, 615 (22.5%) people are 50–64, and 425 (15.5%) people who are 65 and older.

As of 2000 Census, the median income for a household in the town was $34,313, and the median income for a family was $36,587. Males had a median income of $29,760 versus $21,406 for females. The per capita income for the town was $17,912. About 11.4% of families and 15.4% of the population were below the poverty line, including 24.3% of those under age 18 and 8.2% of those age 65 or over.

== Geography ==
According to the United States Census Bureau, the town has a total area of 18.1 square miles (47 km^{2}), of which 17.6 square miles (46 km^{2}) is land and 0.5 square miles (1.3 km^{2}), or 2.70%, is water. Fair Haven is drained by the Poultney River and Castleton River.

To the north, Fair Haven is bordered by Benson. Castleton borders Fair Haven to the east. To the west, Fair Haven is bordered by West Haven, Vermont. Hampton, New York, borders Fair Haven to the south and to the west. In the southeast, Poultney borders Fair Haven.

== Government and politics ==
Fair Haven operates under a town meeting form of government with a town manager and a five-member Selectboard to supervise the local government. It has an annual operating budget of $2.9 million and 29 employees.

The town lacks a mayor, but has a ceremonial mayoral election that is open to pets and animals with a paid submission to raise funds for the local elementary school. In an eighteen-candidate ballot on March 3, 2020, a Cavalier King Charles Spaniel named Murfee was elected as mayor to a one-year term.

== Transportation ==
The town is crossed by a freeway segment of U.S. Route 4, from which three interchanges serve the town. Vermont Route 4A and Vermont Route 22A also pass through Fair Haven as they overlap each other for less than a half mile just south of the town center.

== Sites of interest ==
- Fair Haven Historical Society & Museum
- Ira C. Allen Mansion, the "Marble Mansion"

Fair Haven has a large town green, a fountain in the center of the green, and a gazebo at the south end of the green.

== Notable people ==
- Erik Barnouw, historian of radio and television broadcasting
- Chittenden Lyon, US congressman from Kentucky
- Matthew Lyon, printer, farmer, soldier, founder of Fair Haven, and US congressman
- Joseph A. McNamara, U.S. Attorney for Vermont
- Benjamin F. H. Witherell, jurist
- James Witherell, US congressman

== See also ==
- Fair Haven (Amtrak station)
