= North Bennington station =

North Bennington
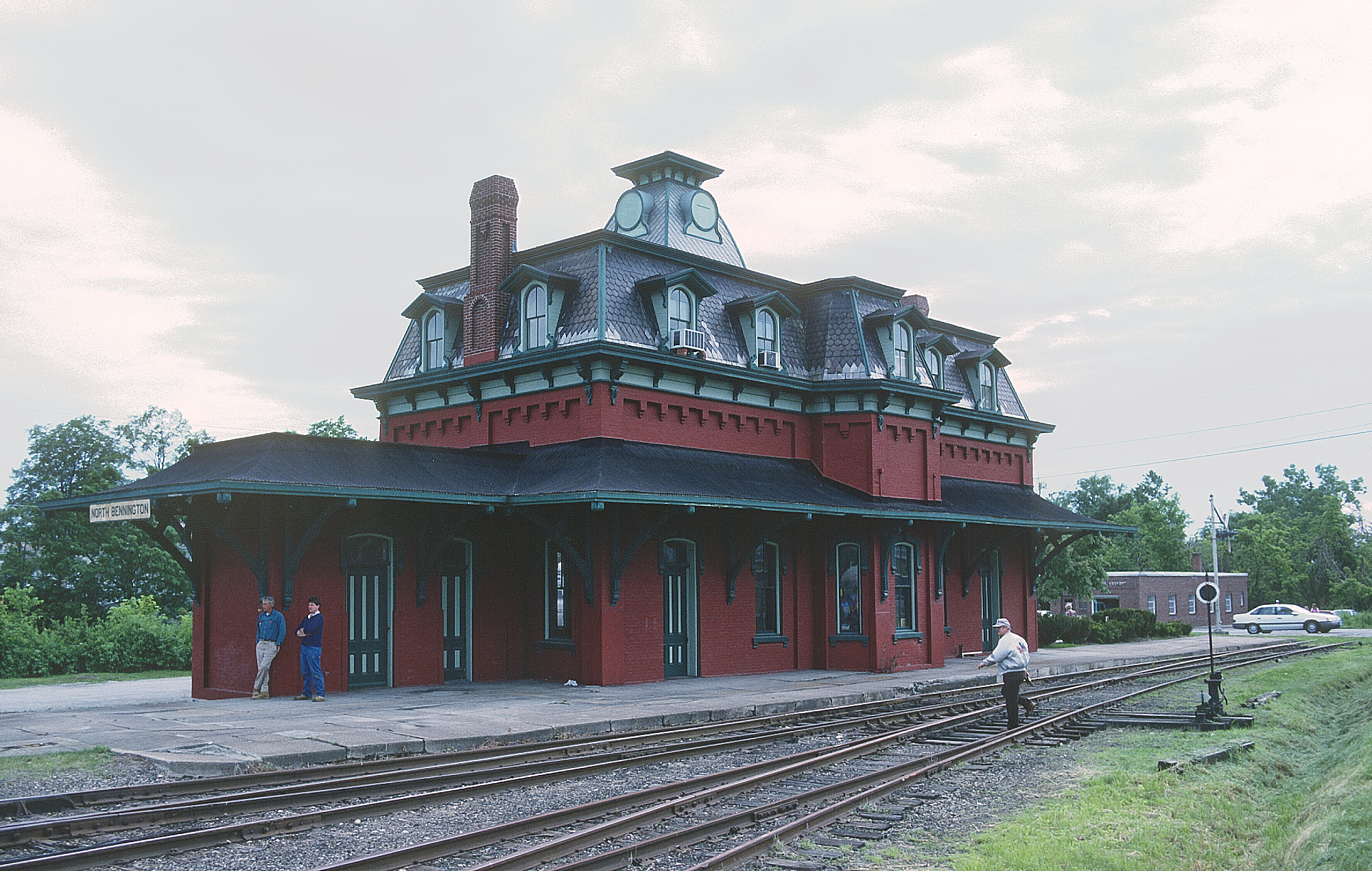
- North Bennington station in June 1988

General information
- Location: Depot Street and Buckley Road; North Bennington, Vermont

History
- Closed: 1953
- Rebuilt: 1880

Former services
Preceding station	Rutland Railroad	Following station
South Shaftsbury toward Rouses Point	Rouses Point–North Bennington	Terminus
Arlington toward Montreal	Green Mountain Flyer / Mount Royal	Troy toward New York
Terminus	Bennington–North Bennington	Bennington Terminus
- North Bennington Depot
- U.S. National Register of Historic Places
- U.S. Historic district – Contributing property
- Coordinates: 42°55′56″N 73°14′32″W
- Area: 1 acre (0.40 ha)
- Built: 1880
- Architectural style: Second Empire, Mansard
- Part of: North Bennington Historic District (ID80000328)
- NRHP reference No.: 73000189

Significant dates
- Added to NRHP: April 11, 1973
- Designated CP: August 29, 1980
Location

North Bennington station is a historic railroad station at Depot Street and Buckley Road in North Bennington, Vermont. Built in 1880 as a passenger station, this Second Empire brick building is a surviving reminder of North Bennington's former importance as a major railroad hub in southwestern Vermont. It was listed on the National Register of Historic Places in 1973 as North Bennington Depot.

== History ==
The Bennington and Rutland Railroad opened between its namesake cities in 1853. A branch from North Bennington to White Creek on the New York border opened at the same time. It connected to the Troy and Boston Railroad at White Creek, connecting the railroad to New York. The short branch was operated by the Troy and Boston and its descendants, the Fitchburg Railroad and later the Boston and Maine Railroad, with interchange made at North Bennington. The Bennington and Rutland was merged into the Rutland Railroad in 1867. The Lebanon Springs Railroad was built in 1869 south from Bennington to Chatham, New York, where it connected with the Boston and Albany Railroad and the New York and Harlem Railroad. This put North Bennington at the junction of two through routes. The line was acquired by the Rutland in 1899.

A new station building was constructed in 1880. The depot is a two-story brick structure, with a mansard roof and a foundation of cut marble. The roof has a cornice studded with brackets, and is composed of multicolored slate. Its mansard section is lined with gabled dormers housing round-arch windows, and there is a mansarded tower rising near the center of the street-facing facade. The ground floor exterior of the building is sheltered by flared canopies supported by large carved knee brackets. The interior is functionally divided into two waiting areas, with an octagonal ticket office between them on the track side. A small single-storage luggage area extends from one end of the building.

Passenger service between North Bennington and Bennington ended in the early 1930s, with buses operating over that segment; passenger service south of Bennington ended not long after. The line was abandoned south of Bennington in 1953. Passenger service to North Bennington by the Green Mountain Flyer and Mount Royal lasted until 1953. The railroad attempted to abandon its entire system in 1961; most lines, including the mainline through North Bennington and the short branch to Bennington, resumed freight service in 1964 under the Vermont Railway.

== See also ==
- National Register of Historic Places listings in Bennington County, Vermont
