= Boston, Hoosac Tunnel and Western Railway =

Former railway company in New York and Vermont

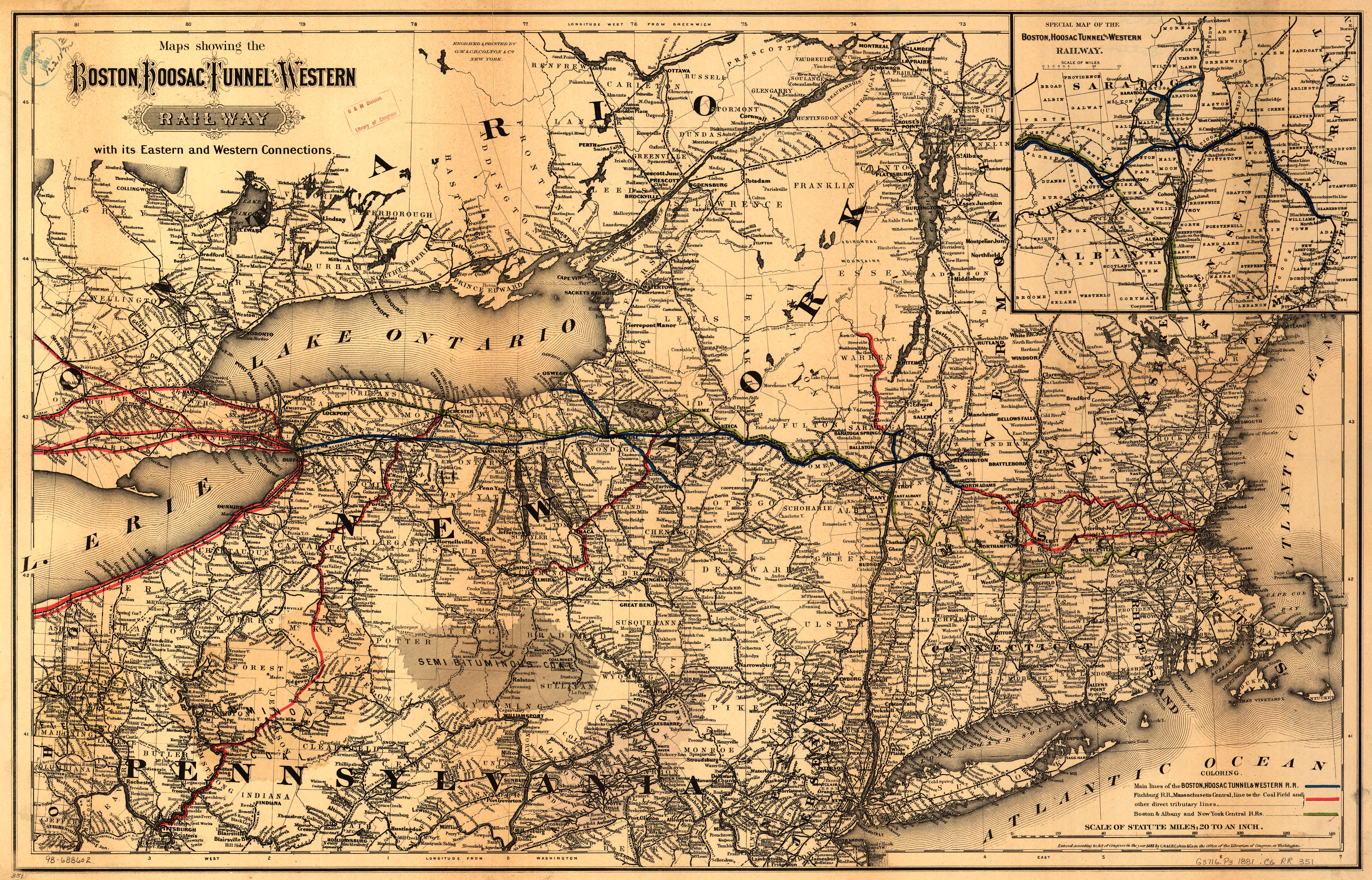
- 1881 map of the line, with connections

Overview
- Dates of operation: 1877–1892
- Successor: Fitchburg Railroad

Technical
- Track gauge: 1,435 mm (4 ft 8 1/2 in)
- Length: 61 miles (98 km) (owned); 25 miles (40 km) (leased)

The Boston, Hoosac Tunnel and Western Railway was a railway company that operated in the states of New York and Vermont in the 1880s. At its peak it controlled a 61-mile (98 km) network centered on Mechanicville, New York. Plans to extend the line west to Buffalo, New York, on Lake Ontario, were never realized, and the Fitchburg Railroad, a predecessor of the Boston and Maine Railroad, acquired control of the company in 1887 and merged it in 1892.

== History ==
There were initially two companies, both named Boston, Hoosac Tunnel and Western Railway, one incorporated in New York (April 16, 1877) and the other in Vermont (April 17, 1878). The two were consolidated into a single company, still with the same name, on April 19, 1880. The company's initial purpose was to establish a new east−west link between Boston, Massachusetts, and points west, via the Hoosac Tunnel, which had been completed in 1875. The Boston, Hoosac Tunnel and Western Railway would build between Mechanicville, New York and the Massachusetts/Vermont state line, where it would connect with the Massachusetts-owned Troy and Greenfield Railroad. In the west, the Delaware and Hudson Railway (D&H) would build between Schenectady, New York, and Mechanicville. Besides the D&H, the Erie Railroad supported the new line.

The 38-mile (61 km) line between Mechanicville and the Vermont/Massachusetts state line opened on December 22, 1879. Between Valley Falls, New York, and the Massachusetts state line the Boston, Hoosac Tunnel and Western Railway ran parallel with the Troy and Boston Railroad; both lines following the Hoosic River. From the Massachusetts state line, the company operated over the Troy and Greenfield to North Adams, Massachusetts, where it interchanged with the Fitchburg Railroad. The line interchanged with the D&H at two points: Eagle Bridge, New York (the Rutland and Washington Railroad), and at Mechanicville (the Rensselaer and Saratoga Railroad). The D&H completed the new line between Mechanicville and Schenectady in December 1881, eliminating the need to run via Ballston Spa, New York.

=== Western extension ===
In early 1884, the company completed a 23 miles (37 km) extension from Mechanicville to Rotterdam Junction, west of Schenectady, enabling interchange with the West Shore Railroad. (Note: There is some confusion over the date of the Rotterdam extension. Karr suggests that the entire Rotterdam–Massachusetts line opened in January 1879. The ICC valuation report for the Boston and Maine misprints "1855.") At one point, the company planned to build west across the state of New York to points on Lake Erie (Buffalo) and Lake Ontario (Oswego). The resulting line would have been 400 miles (640 km) long. In furtherance on this plan, the company was consolidated with five other companies on April 9, 1880: the Hoosac Tunnel and Saratoga Railway; Utica and Syracuse Air-Line Railway; Syracuse, Chenango and New York Railroad; Syracuse, Phoenix and Oswego Railroad; and Mohawk and Lake Erie Railway. The New York Supreme Court subsequently ruled that the consolidation was illegal, and nothing came of these plans.

=== Branches ===
The Boston, Hoosac Tunnel and Western Railway leased the Saratoga Lake Railway and Hoosac Tunnel and Saratoga Railway in July 1882. These two companies gave the Boston, Hoosac Tunnel and Western Railway a branch from Mechanicville to Saratoga Springs, New York, via Saratoga Lake, New York, and from Saratoga Lake to Schuylerville, New York. The two companies were consolidated in 1886 to form the Troy, Saratoga and Northern Railroad.

=== Fitchburg control ===
The Fitchburg Railroad acquired the Troy and Greenfield Railroad from Massachusetts on February 1, 1887, and the Troy and Boston Railroad on May 3, 1887. Shortly thereafter, the Fitchburg gained control of the Boston, Hoosac Tunnel and Western Railway, and operated the formerly separate parallel single-track lines of the Boston, Hoosac Tunnel and Western Railway and the Troy and Boston between Williamstown, Massachusetts, and Johnstown, New York, as a single line. A similar arrangement was made with the D&H for the parallel lines between Mechanicville and "Crescent", in the direction of Schenectady. The Boston, Hoosac Tunnel and Western Railway and the Troy, Saratoga and Northern Railroad were formally merged with the Fitchburg Railroad on October 1, 1892.
