= Canadian Subdivision =

Railway line in New York, United States

Overview
- Owner: Canadian Pacific Kansas City

Service
- Services: Adirondack; Ethan Allen Express

History
- Opened: 1875

Technical
- Line length: 170.4 mi (274.2 km)
- Track gauge: 1,435 mm (4 ft 8 1/2 in) standard gauge

The Canadian Subdivision is a railway line in the state of New York. It runs north–south along the west side of Lake Champlain from the vicinity of Schenectady, New York, to Rouses Point, New York, on the border with Quebec. While the oldest part of the line was built in 1832–1833, the majority was constructed between 1869 and 1876. Once part of the Delaware and Hudson Railway main line, today Canadian Pacific Kansas City owns the line. Amtrak's Adirondack operates over the full length, providing daily service between New York City and Montreal.

== History ==
=== Schenectady–Saratoga Springs ===
The oldest part of the Canadian Subdivision is the line south from Saratoga Springs, New York, towards Schenectady, New York. The Saratoga and Schenectady Railroad was incorporated in 1831, making it one of the oldest railroads in North America. The 21-mile (34 km) line between Schenectady and Saratoga Springs via Ballston Spa, New York, was completed in 1833. (Note: Canadian Pacific Kansas City assigns the southern part of this line to its Freight Subdivision.) The Rensselaer and Saratoga Railroad leased the Saratoga and Schenectady Railroad on January 1, 1851; the Delaware and Hudson Railway leased both companies on May 1, 1871.

=== Saratoga Springs–Whitehall ===
The Saratoga and Washington Railroad was chartered in 1834 to build north from Saratoga Springs to Whitehall, New York. The Panic of 1837 interrupted the development of the property, and original line was not completed until August 15, 1848. The company was reorganized as the Saratoga and Whitehall Railroad on June 8, 1855, which was in turn leased by the Rensselaer and Saratoga Railroad on March 14, 1865.

=== Whitehall–Plattsburgh ===
The first serious attempt to build a railroad along the west coast of Lake Champlain was made by the Whitehall and Plattsburgh Railroad, incorporated in 1868. That company planned a route via the Ausable River, most of which was never built. The D&H-backed New York and Canada Railroad, incorporated in 1873, completed the line between Whitehall and Plattsburgh on November 29, 1875.

=== Plattsburgh–Canada Junction ===
The Plattsburgh and Montreal Railroad was incorporated in 1850 to construct, with two Canadian companies, a new route between Plattsburgh, New York, and Montreal. The company opened a line between Plattsburgh and Mooers on July 26, 1852. The line passed to the New York and Canada Railroad in 1873 and the D&H in 1908. The southern part of the line, between Plattsburgh and Canada Junction, is now part of the Canadian Subdivision. The D&H abandoned the northern part of the line in 1925.

=== Canada Junction–Rouses Point ===
On the completion of the line to Plattsburgh in 1875, D&H trains used the original Plattsburgh and Montreal Railroad line to Mooers, and then the Ogdensburg and Lake Champlain Railroad to Rouses Point, New York. The New York and Canada constructed a 13-mile (21 km) cutoff from Chazy, New York, to Rouses Point, which opened on September 18, 1876. (Note: Shaughnessy gives the date as "by the end of November"; the ICC valuation report says "about July 1, 1876.")

=== Rouses Point–Canadian border ===
From Rouses Point, trains reached Canada over the tracks of the Grand Trunk Railway. In 1906 the D&H established a Canadian subsidiary, the Napierville Junction Railway, to construct a new, shorter route that would connect with the Canadian Pacific Railway at Delson. The Napierville Junction Railway built up to the Canadian border, while the New York and Canada built a connecting track up from Rouses Point. This new line opened on May 20, 1907.

== Operations ==
The D&H's New York–Montreal passenger trains (such as the Laurentian) operated via Albany, New York, and Mechanicville, New York, joining the Lake Champlain line at Ballston Spa. In 1964, the D&H built a connection between its freight bypass and the Lake Champlain line further south, enabling the abandonment of the original Rensselaer and Saratoga line.

Amtrak's Adirondack operates over the full length, providing daily service between New York City and Montreal. The Ethan Allen Express, which serves Burlington, Vermont, leaves the line just short of Whitehall. When introduced in 1974, the Adirondack used the same route as the Laurentian, with flag stops in Watervliet and Mechanicville. With the January 29, 1979 timetable change, the Adirondack was re-routed to serve Schenectady instead.
