= Freight Subdivision =

Railway line in New York

Overview
- Owner: Canadian Pacific Kansas City

History
- Opened: December 1881

Technical
- Line length: 17.2 mi (27.7 km)
- Track gauge: 4 ft 8 1/2 in (1,435 mm) standard gauge

The Freight Subdivision is a railway line in the New York. It runs from Schenectady, New York, to Mechanicville, New York. It was built by the Delaware and Hudson Railway in 1881 as a freight-only bypass, connecting with the main line of the Boston, Hoosac Tunnel and Western Railway. Today, Canadian Pacific Kansas City owns the line.

== History ==
The Boston, Hoosac Tunnel and Western Railway was incorporated in 1877 to build a new railway line linking western New York with Boston, Massachusetts, via the Hoosac Tunnel. The western terminus of the new line, which opened in 1879, was Mechanicville, New York. The Delaware and Hudson Railway had two lines in the vicinity: the Rensselaer and Saratoga Railroad, which ran northwest from Albany to Ballston Spa via Mechanicville; and the Saratoga and Schenectady Railroad, which ran north between Schenectady and Saratoga Springs via Ballston Spa.

To link these lines and eliminate running via Ballston Spa, the D&H constructed a 9-mile (14 km) line between "Coons", west of Mechanicville, and East Glenville, New York. The line opened in December 1881. In 1884, the Boston, Hoosac Tunnel and Western Railway built further west to Rotterdam Junction. (Note: There is some confusion over the date of the Rotterdam extension. Karr suggests that the entire Rotterdam–Massachusetts line opened in January 1879. The ICC valuation report for the Boston and Maine misprints "1855.") This line ran parallel to the D&H line between Mechanicville and "Crescent", 9 miles (14 km) to the west, and the two lines were operated together as a single unit.

In 1964 the D&H built a 1.1-mile (1.8 km) connection northwest from the line to the former Saratoga and Schenectady Railroad line and abandoned the former Rensselaer and Saratoga Railroad between Mechanicville and Ballston Spa. The D&H's remaining passenger trains, including the Laurentian, were re-routed over the freight bypass.

== Operations ==
As of 2023 Canadian Pacific Kansas City, successor to the D&H, includes in the "Freight Subdivision" the entirety of the 1881 freight bypass, the former Saratoga and Schenectady Railroad from East Glenville to Schenectady, and the former Rensselaer and Saratoga Railroad between Coons and Mechanicville. Amtrak's Adirondack uses the western end of the line.
