= Batten Kill Railroad =

Class III railroad in New York

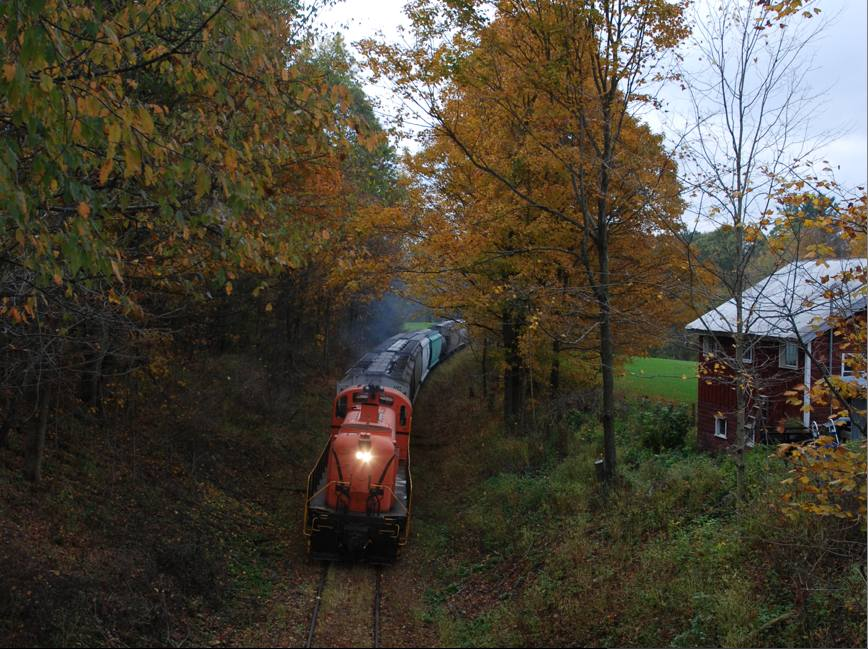
- BKRR Engine #4116 heading northbound at North Old State Road near Eagle Bridge, New York.

Overview
- Headquarters: Greenwich, New York
- Key people: William Taber (CEO)
- Reporting mark: BKRR
- Locale: New York
- Dates of operation: 1982–present
- Predecessor: Delaware & Hudson Railway; Greenwich & Johnsonville Railway

Technical
- Track gauge: 4 ft 8 1/2 in (1,435 mm)
- Length: 32 mi (51 km)

The Batten Kill Railroad (reporting mark BKRR) is a class III railroad operating in New York. The BKRR was formed in 1982 beginning operations on October 22 of a pair of abandoned Delaware and Hudson Railway branch lines, totaling about 30 miles of track.

== History ==
The Greenwich and Johnsonville Railway (G&J) was incorporated in the late part of the 19th century, and built a rail line between Greenwich and Johnsonville, New York.

Around 1900, G&J became a subsidiary of the Delaware and Hudson Railway (D&H). By 1907, the G&J (with support from parent D&H) had built a branch from Greenwich to Greenwich Junction (just south of Salem) where it connected to the D&H's Washington Branch that was built circa 1856. The old G&J route to Johnsonville was abandoned in July 1932 and all traffic henceforth went via "The Junction" in Salem. Most of the abandoned section to Johnsonville eventually became (Washington) County Route 74.

Following the 1980 closure of the Georgia Pacific pulp & paper mill in Thomson, New York, the D&H planned to abandon the G&J along with the adjoining Washington Branch, which ran from Eagle Bridge, New York to Castleton, Vermont. In 1982, Mohawk-Hudson Transportation, owned by Ron Crowd, purchased the railroad from the D&H, forming the Batten Kill Railroad. Crowd had the distinction of being the first African-American to own and operate a railroad in the United States.

While initially financially successful, a series of national railroad strikes in the mid-1980s left the railroad in a less profitable state. In 1994, the railroad was turned over to Northeast New York Rail Preservation Group, a non-profit, and the BKRR remained the operator. Passenger excursions were started, but were terminated by late 2003 due to declining ridership. In November 2008, William (Bill) Taber purchased the Batten Kill from Mohawk Transportation and the estate of the late Ron Crowd. Taber is the current President and CEO of the railroad.

== Rail assistance programs ==
In 2016, the Batten Kill Railroad got a $1.3 million state grant funding installation of new cross ties onto about 4 miles of track.

== Route ==
The Batten Kill's sole interchange location is in Eagle Bridge, New York where it connects to the main line of Berkshire and Eastern Railroad (formerly Pan Am Railways and the Boston & Maine). The line runs north from Eagle Bridge, through Cambridge, New York and Shushan, New York, to Greenwich Junction. From there, a short remnant of the D&H Washington Branch continues north into Salem, New York. This segment is out of service. This north-south component of the line is paralleled by NY Route 22. The other route from the junction continues west to the village of Greenwich, paralleled by NY Route 29. The line running west from Greenwich to Thomson, New York, is also out of service. In Greenwich, the railroad maintains a small engine house and the former G&J depot as an office.

== Locomotive Roster ==
The Batten Kill Railroad currently owns two locomotives:

- BKRR Engine #605 is an Alco RS-3 built in 1950, originally Lehigh & Hudson River Railroad (L&HR) Engine #10.
- BKRR Engine #4116 is an Alco RS-3 built in 1952, originally Delaware & Hudson Railway (D&H) Engine #4116 and later transferred to the Greenwich and Johnsonville Railway (G&J), its subsidiary. The engine continues to keep lettering for the G&J.

=== Additional Locomotives on Batten Kill Railroad ===
- SNEX Engine #5012 is an Alco RS-36 built in 1962, originally Atlantic & Danville Railway (A&D) Engine #2. It was acquired from the Delaware Coast Line Railroad (DCLR) in 2018 by the Southern New England Railroad (SNEX).
- SNEX Engine #5015 is an Alco RS-36 built in 1963, originally Delaware & Hudson Railway (D&H) Engine #5015. It was acquired from the Lucas Oil Rail Line (LNAC) in 2020 by the Southern New England Railroad (SNEX).
- SNEX Engine #408 is an Alco RS-36 built in 1962, originally Norfolk & Western Railway Engine #408. It was acquired from Ontario Midland Railroad (OMID) in 2023 by the Southern New England Railroad (SNEX).
- RPCX Engine #3501 is an Alco RS-1 built in 1951, originally Engine #107 for DuPont under the U.S. Department of Energy. It was acquired by the Saratoga, Corinth & Hudson Railway (SCHX) in 2023.
