= New York and Canada Railroad =

Overview
- Founders: Isaac V. Baker Jr.; Smith Mead Weed
- Predecessors: Montreal and Plattsburgh Railroad; New York and Canada Railroad; Whitehall and Plattsburgh Railroad
- Successor: Delaware and Hudson Railway

Technical
- Track gauge: 1,435 mm (4 ft 8 1/2 in)

The New York and Canada Railroad was a railway company that operated in the state of New York between 1873 and 1908. It was established to consolidate existing companies in the northern part of the state and to complete a north–south railway line along the west side of Lake Champlain. Through service to Plattsburgh, New York, began in 1875, and the company later extended further north to Rouses Point, New York (1876), and to the Canadian border (1906). Always under Delaware and Hudson Railway control, the company was formally merged in 1908. Today, the Lake Champlain line is part of the Canadian Pacific Kansas City's Canadian Subdivision.

== History ==
The backers of the Whitehall and Plattsburgh Railroad had attempted to establish a railway line along the west side of Lake Champlain via the Ausable River valley. The effort sputtered out in 1870–1871, leaving two disconnected railway lines: a 21-mile (34 km) line between Plattsburgh, New York, and Ausable, New York, and a 15-mile (24 km) line between Port Henry, New York, and Fort Ticonderoga. The latter had been leased by the Rutland Railroad in an effort to prevent the creation of the new route.

This setback proved temporary. New York State Assemblyman Smith Mead Weed, and Rensselaer and Saratoga Railroad president Isaac V. Baker Jr., persuaded the Delaware and Hudson Railway to back a new effort to build the line. The first New York and Canada Railroad was incorporated on March 16, 1872, and the consolidated with the Whitehall and Plattsburgh and Montreal and Plattsburgh Railroads on April 15, 1873, to form the second New York and Canada Railroad.

The New York and Canada eschewed the Ausable River route of the White and Plattsburgh in favor of a more direct route that followed the Lake Champlain coast. The company completed the 24-mile (39 km) line between Whitehall and Addison Junction on November 30, 1874. The difficult terrain between Port Henry and Plattsburgh required an additional year and that part of the line opened on November 29, 1875. The Whitehall and Plattsburgh Railroad line to Ausable was retained as a branch. To reach Montreal, trains used the former Montreal and Plattsburgh Railroad line between Plattsburgh and Mooers, New York, then the Ogdensburg and Lake Champlain Railroad from Mooers to Rouses Point, New York, and then the tracks of Grand Trunk Railway.

The New York and Canada constructed a 13-mile (21 km) line from Chazy, New York, to Rouses Point, eliminating the need to run via Mooers and the Ogdensburg and Lake Champlain Railroad. This line opened on September 18, 1876. (Note: Shaughnessy gives the date as "by the end of November"; the ICC valuation report says "about July 1, 1876.") The New York and Canada also constructed a short, 5-mile (8.0 km) branch through Ticonderoga, New York, to Baldwin, on the north end of Lake George. This line opened in May 1875.

A final shortening of the route to Montreal occurred with the building of the Napierville Junction Railway and subsequent D&H control. The Napierville Junction Railway, incorporated in 1906, built a 27 miles (43 km) line from the Canadian border near Rouses Point north to Delson and a junction with the Canadian Pacific Railway. The New York and Canada built a 1.1 miles (1.8 km) connection up to the border. The new route opened on May 20, 1907. (Note: The D&H obtained full stock control of the Napierville Junction Railway from operation, but did not, contra Shaughnessy, acquire the company outright.) The D&H merged the New York and Canada on May 23, 1908.

== Lines ==
The main line of the New York and Canada Railroad ran from Whitehall, New York, to the Canadian border via Plattsburgh and Rouses Point. This line forms the major part of the Canadian Pacific Kansas City's Canadian Subdivision. In addition, the company had three branches:

- the Ausable Branch, the original line of the Whitehall and Plattsburgh south from Plattsburgh. It was abandoned in 1981.
- the Baldwin Branch, running 5 miles (8.0 km) from Montcalm Landing on the main line to Baldwin on Lake George. A short line built by the Ticonderoga Railroad branched off to serve Ticonderoga proper.
- the Mooers Branch, the original line of the Montreal and Plattsburgh from Plattsburgh to the Canadian border. Its importance lessened when the Rouses Point cutoff opened, and it was abandoned in 1925.
