= Greenwich and Johnsonville Railway =

Former railroad in Upstate New York

Overview
- Dates of operation: 1866–1982
- Successor: Batten Kill Railroad

Technical
- Track gauge: 4 ft 8 1/2 in (1,435 mm)

The Greenwich and Johnsonville Railway (reporting mark GJ) was a railroad in Upstate New York. It was founded in 1866 to construct a line from Greenwich to Johnsonville. The line opened in 1870. The Delaware and Hudson Railway acquired control of the railroad in 1906 and sold it to the Batten Kill Railroad in 1982.

== History ==
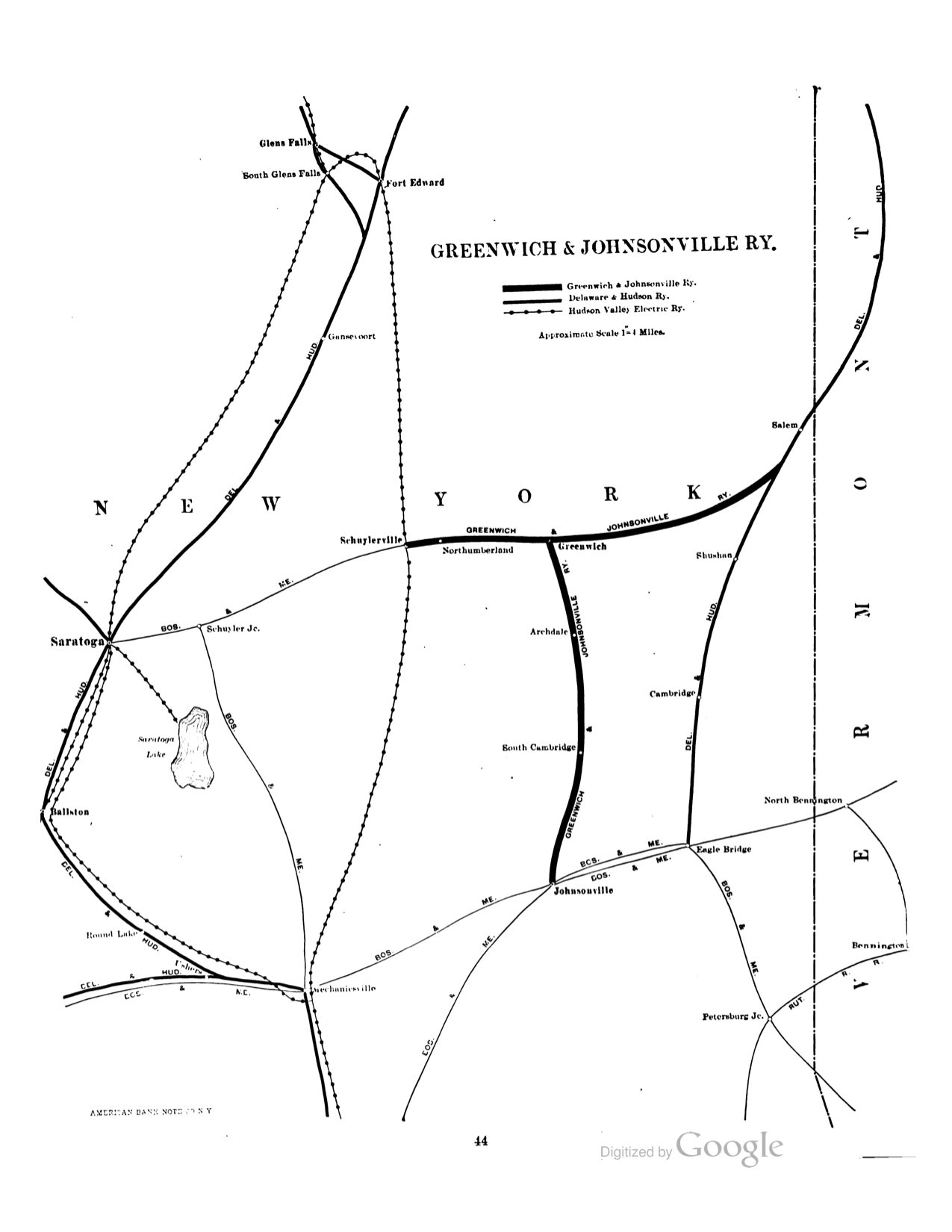
The Greenwich and Johnsonville Railway in 1907, after the completion of the Salem branch

The railroad incorporated as the Union Village and Johnsonville Railroad on October 13, 1866, for the purpose of constructing a line from Union Village (as Greenwich was then known) to Johnsonville. Union Village was renamed Greenwich in 1867, and thereafter the company did business as the Greenwich and Johnsonville Railroad. The 14-mile (23 km) line between Greenwich and Johnsonville opened on August 31, 1870. At Johnsonville it connected with the Troy and Boston Railroad, a forerunner of the Boston and Maine Railroad. The company's name change became official on March 26, 1874; it reorganized as the Greenwich and Johnsonville Railway on September 10, 1879.

At the turn of the twentieth century the company extended its line west from Greenwich to Schuylerville, New York, to connect with the Boston and Maine's Saratoga branch. It chartered the Battenkill Railroad for this purpose on December 15, 1902, and consolidated that company on August 12 the following year when the 7-mile (11 km) branch opened. The Delaware and Hudson took an interest in the small railroad, and in 1906 bought up the Greenwich and Johnsonville's capital stock, acquiring complete control. Under the aegis of the D&H the G&J built the "Salem branch," a 10.12-mile (16.29 km) extension eastward from Greenwich to the D&H's line near Salem, New York at Greenwich Junction.

Under the D&H the original line between Greenwich and Johnsonville was abandoned on July 28, 1932, leaving Schuylerville–Greenwich Junction. Passenger service ended in 1933. The D&H made little use of the connection with the B&M at Schuylerville, and cut the line back to Thomson after the bridge over the Hudson River washed out. The D&H sold the Greenwich and Johnsonville to the Batten Kill Railroad in 1982.
