= Syracuse Northwestern Railroad =

Overview
- Locale: Woodard, north of Syracuse, New York to Haymarket Square
- Dates of operation: 1874–1875
- Successor: Syracuse, Phoenix and Oswego Railway later part of New York Central Railroad

Technical
- Track gauge: 4 ft 8 1/2 in (1,435 mm) standard gauge

The Syracuse Northwestern Railroad was established in 1874 to construct a railroad from Woodard to Haymarket Square in Syracuse, New York. The company was consolidated under the Syracuse, Phoenix and Oswego Railroad in 1875 and was sold under a judgement in 1885 under the name Syracuse, Phoenix and Oswego Railway.

In 1889, the railroad line merged with Rome, Watertown and Ogdensburg Railroad until 1913, when the company became part of the New York Central and Hudson River Railroad which was renamed to New York Central Railroad in 1914.

== History ==
The Syracuse Northwestern Railroad Company was chartered on September 19, 1874, to build from Woodard to Haymarket Square in Syracuse. The road consolidated under the Syracuse, Phoenix and Oswego Railroad on June 10, 1875, before the company could build any road.

=== Syracuse, Phoenix and Oswego railroad ===
Syracuse, Phoenix and Oswego Railroad was sold under a judgement of the New York Supreme Court on January 31, 1885, and reorganized without change of name on February 16, 1885, under Syracuse, Phoenix and Oswego Railway. The road opened on September 7, 1885, and leased to the Rome, Watertown and Ogdensburg Railroad (RW&ORR) on December 8, 1885.

=== New York Central railroad ===
In 1889, the railroad line merged with Rome, Watertown and Ogdensburg Railroad until 1913, when the company became part of the New York Central and Hudson River Railroad which was renamed to New York Central Railroad in 1914.
