= Coffin Site =

- U.S. National Register of Historic Places
- Nearest city: Greenwich
- Area: 9 acres (3.6 ha)
- NRHP reference No.: 80002786
- Added to NRHP: July 22, 1980

Coffin Site is an archaeological site located at Greenwich in Washington County, New York, United States. It has 90 acres and was the site of the prehistoric settlement.

It was listed on the National Register of Historic Places in 1980.
