= Plattsburgh and Montreal Railroad =

Railway company in New York

Overview
- Dates of operation: 1849–1873
- Successor: New York and Canada Railroad

Technical
- Track gauge: 1,435 mm (4 ft 8 1/2 in)

The Plattsburgh and Montreal Railroad was a railway company that operated in the state of New York in the mid-19th century. The company completed a 23-mile (37 km) line from Plattsburgh, New York, to the Canadian border north of Mooers, New York, in 1852. The company was subsequently reorganized as the Montreal and Plattsburgh Railroad in 1868 and consolidated with two other companies in 1873 to form the New York and Canada Railroad. The southern half of the company's line is part of the Canadian Pacific Kansas City's Canadian Subdivision; the Delaware and Hudson Railway abandoned the rest in 1925.

== History ==
The Plattsburgh and Montreal Railroad was incorporated in 1850. It was part of a scheme with the Lake St. Louis and Province Line Railway and Montreal and Lachine Railroad to construct a new line between Plattsburgh, New York, and Montreal. The line opened between Plattsburgh and Mooers on July 26, 1852, and to the Canadian border on September 20. It connected with the Ogdensburg and Lake Champlain Railroad in Mooers. At the time, no railway extended south from Plattsburgh, but steamboats operating on Lake Champlain provided a connection with Burlington, Vermont, and other destinations.

The Plattsburgh and Montreal Railroad was reorganized as the Montreal and Plattsburgh Railroad on August 20, 1868. In 1869 it leased the northern portion of the Whitehall and Plattsburgh Railroad, which had been building south from Plattsburgh and encountered financial difficulties. The Central Vermont Railway leased both companies between 1871 and 1873, On the termination of the leases in 1873, the two railroads were consolidated with the New York and Canada Railroad, the new company keeping the name New York and Canada Railroad.

The New York and Canada built north to Rouses Point, New York, in 1876, which lessened the importance of the line to Mooers (known as the Mooers Branch under D&H control). The Delaware and Hudson Railway, successor to the New York and Canada, abandoned the line north of Canada Junction in 1925. The remaining part of the line between Plattsburgh and Canada Junction is part of the Canadian Pacific Kansas City's Canadian Subdivision.
