= Whitehall and Plattsburgh Railroad =

Railway company in New York

Overview
- Dates of operation: 1868–1873
- Successor: New York and Canada Railroad

Technical
- Track gauge: 1,435 mm (4 ft 8 1/2 in)
- Length: 36 miles (58 km)

The Whitehall and Plattsburgh Railroad was a railway company that built but did not operate two disconnected railway lines in Upstate New York in the 19th century. Its purpose, to build a 90-mile (140 km) railway line between Whitehall, New York, and Plattsburgh, New York, was realized by its successor, the New York and Canada Railroad, albeit over a different route between Port Henry, New York, and Plattsburgh. Its northern line, between Plattsburgh and Ausable, New York, became the Ausable Branch of the Delaware and Hudson Railway and was abandoned in 1981. Its southern line, between Port Henry and Ticonderoga, New York, was incorporated into the New York and Canada Railroad main line and today is part of the Canadian Pacific Kansas City's Canadian Subdivision.

== History ==
The Whitehall and Plattsburgh Railroad was incorporated on March 20, 1868. The company planned a 90-mile (140 km) line linking Plattsburgh, New York, the southern terminus of the Montreal and Plattsburgh Railroad, with Whitehall, New York, the northern terminus of the Rensselaer and Saratoga Railroad. The planned route ran north from Whitehall to Port Henry, New York, on Lake Champlain, then turned inland to follow the Ausable River. An early champion of the company was Smith Mead Weed, member of the New York State Assembly for Clinton County, but he was unable to secure public funding for the railroad.

In the north, the company completed 21 miles (34 km) from Plattsburgh to Ausable, New York, following the Ausable River. Built in 1869, the line was leased to the Montreal and Plattsburgh in 1870. In the south, the company completed 15 miles (24 km) from Port Henry to Addison Junction, near Fort Ticonderoga, in 1870. The Rutland Railroad was anxious to prevent the construction of a new railway line along the west side of Lake Champlain, and leased this line in 1871. The Vermont Central Railroad assumed this lease when it leased the Rutland itself later that year. The Addison Railroad, another Rutland-controlled company, bridged Lake Champlain near Ticonderoga in December 1871, connecting with the southern Whitehall and Plattsburgh line.

The project of a line along the western coast of Lake Champlain was revived in March 1872 with the incorporation of the New York and Canada Railroad. This new concern had the backing of the Delaware and Hudson Railway, who had leased the Rensselaer and Saratoga Railroad in 1871. The D&H, through the New York and Canada, acquired the leases of the two Whitehall and Plattsburgh lines in early 1873 and then consolidated the company with the New York and Canada and the Montreal and Plattsburgh Railroad to form a new company, also called the New York and Canada Railroad.

The D&H accepted the engineering difficulties of building along the Lake Champlain coast and did not pursue the Whitehall and Plattsburgh's route along the Ausable River. The Ausable Branch, as it was known, became part of the D&H system and was finally abandoned in 1981. The line between Ticonderoga and Port Henry is part of the Canadian Pacific Kansas City's Canadian Subdivision.
