= LeRoy Earl Brophey Sr. =

American lawyer and politician

LeRoy Earl Brophey Sr. (September 1, 1880 — August 8, 1945) was an American lawyer and politician.

Brophey was born in Greenwich, Washington County, New York. He went to Valparaiso University in Indiana and then studied law at Minnesota College of Law. Brophey was admitted to the Minnesota bar and practiced law in Minneapolis, Minnesota. He lived with his wife and family in Minneapolis. Brophey served in the Minnesota House of Representatives in 1919 and 1920, from 1925 to 1940 and then from 1943 to 1945 when he died from a heart attack at his home in Minneapolis.
