= Lacolle station =

Railway station in Quebec, Canada

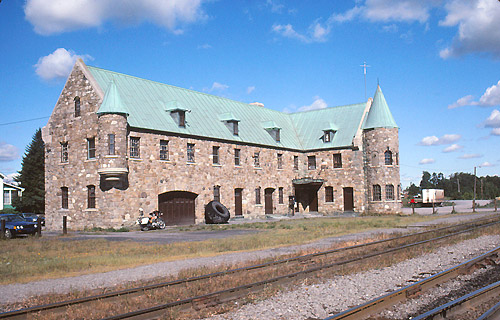
- Lacolle station in September 1983
- Interactive map of the Lacolle station area

General information
- Location: 21 rue Ste-Marie, Lacolle, Quebec, Canada
- Coordinates: 45°04′55″N 73°22′08″W
- Construction started: July 15, 1930
- Completed: November 15, 1930
- Inaugurated: November 17, 1930

Design and construction
- Architect: Charles Reginald Tetley

Heritage Railway Station (Canada)
- Official name: Canadian Pacific Railway Station
- Designated: 1991
- Reference no.: 4530

Lacolle station is a former railway station in Lacolle, Quebec. Its address is 21 rue Ste-Marie adjacent to the Canadian Pacific Railway (CPR) Lacolle Subdivision. A large piece of land surrounds it and a long yard is located on the other side of the tracks.

Situated close to the Canada–US border, the Canadian Pacific Railway station at Lacolle played a role as both a railway station and a customs and immigration post for Canadian and American border officers.

Today the building is abandoned, but acquisition of the station from Canadian Pacific Railway is almost complete as of October 2011 by the municipality of Lacolle. The municipality is planning for the restoration of the station by 2014 at an estimated cost of 1 million dollars. The station is planned to be a municipal museum; the historical society would also have space for a conference room (as told by local newspapers and the mayor of Lacolle).

== History ==
In 1881, the Napierville Junction Railway was created to build a line from Rouses Point, New York to Montreal, Quebec. Construction involved the most direct route to Montreal with minimal grades possible. After the line was completed Lacolle had already built a wooden railway station (construction date never found) that was later ravaged by flames in 1929.

In 1907, the Napierville Junction Railway was purchased by the Delaware & Hudson Company, hence the D&H's architecture/style of the station. On April 9, 1907, the Napierville Junction Railway was opened from Delson, QC to the US-Canada border, giving the Delaware & Hudson a link to the Canadian Pacific Railway and the Grand Trunk Railway. The Napierville Junction was given the same track that the D&H's subsidiary company, the New York & Canada Railroad had built the year before from the border to Rouses Point. Its length was approximately 1.1 miles.

As soon as the track was placed, the D&H used this route, and a small stretch of the Grand Trunk track, to get to Montreal. This route did not last long, however. On October 1, 1917, the D&H began using CPR tracks out of Delson to reach Montreal.

There was also another route used from Canada Junction, just north of Plattsburgh to Montreal.

Construction started on Lacolle railway station on July 15, 1930, and was completed on November 15, 1930. The cost of construction was C$38,718.30 in 1930 ($513,096.30 in 2011 Dollars) and it was built by the Delaware & Hudson Railway. The station was inaugurated two days later on November 17, 1930. The building housed customs offices, maintenance equipment and brokers. It was mainly used for passenger service until the 1980s.

For over 53 years, the Napierville Junction had its own identity until 1970 when the Delaware & Hudson/Canadian Pacific railway merged it into its own Montreal Division.

Lacolle was the epicenter of the Napierville Junction, even in the years after the D&H merger. The large station hosted passengers for the Montreal Limited and the Adirondack. There were offices and rooms for officials, train conductors and maintenance crews alike.

In 1991 the Canadian Pacific Railway bought the Napierville Junction Railway to own the stretch of track from Delson Jct. to Rouses Point. The Delaware and Hudson operates and is wholly owned by the Canadian Pacific Railway. Due to the renovations, CPR closed down the station and abandoned the property in 1998. Employees working at the station were mostly relocated to work at the Canadian Pacific yards in Montreal.

== Architecture ==
Built by the Napierville Junction Railway, a subsidiary of the American-owned Delaware and Hudson Railway, the Lacolle railway station illustrates the effect of international investment on railway construction in Canada. Lacolle station is a late example of the Château-style developed by railway companies during the late-19th and early-20th centuries. Designed by Montreal architect Charles Reginald Tetley, its resemblance to a Normandy manor house reflects the romantic view of its American owners towards the architecture of Old Quebec, and their desire to signify to American travelers that they had arrived in a francophone province.

The station retains its relationship with a stone wall of similar masonry which defines the station property. The station serves as a landmark in the community.

The cobblestone was carried in from the other side of the Richelieu River on farm land in Noyan, QC. The building was built in an L shape from a top view and the roof is made of copper sheeting. In 1991 Parks Canada listed the Lacolle Station as one of only 54 stations in Canada to be officially preserved. Lacolle Station was officially designated under the Heritage Railway Stations Protection Act on 22 November 1991.

| Preceding station | Napierville Junction Railway | Following station |
|---|---|---|
| Napierville toward Delson | Main Line | Rouses Point Terminus |
