= Greenwich (town), New York =

Greenwich
- Town
- Location in Washington County and the state of New York.
- Coordinates: 43°07′54″N 73°28′38″W
- Country: United States
- State: New York
- County: Washington
- Established: 1803

Government
  - Town supervisor: James J. Mumby (No Official Party)

Area
  - Total: 44.26 sq mi (114.64 km^{2})
  - Land: 43.66 sq mi (113.09 km^{2})
  - Water: 0.60 sq mi (1.55 km^{2})

Population (2020)
  - Total: 4,868
  - Density: 111.5/sq mi (43.05/km^{2})
- Time zone: UTC-5 (EST)
  - Summer (DST): UTC-4
- ZIP code(s): 12834 (primary): 12809 Argyle; 12823 Cossayuna; 12865 Salem
- Area code: 518
- FIPS code: 36-115-30686
- Website: http://www.greenwichny.org/

Greenwich is a town in the southwestern part of Washington County, New York, United States. The town is located on the western border of the county. The population was 4,868 at the 2020 census. It is part of the Glens Falls Metropolitan Statistical Area. Greenwich features several homes that were a part of the Underground Railroad.

The Town of Greenwich contains a village, also named Greenwich.

== History ==
The land is believed to have been inhabited by the Mohicans, now known as the Stockbridge-Munsee Community. Other Indigenous groups who likely inhabited the area include the Mohawk people of the Haudenosaunee and the Abenaki.

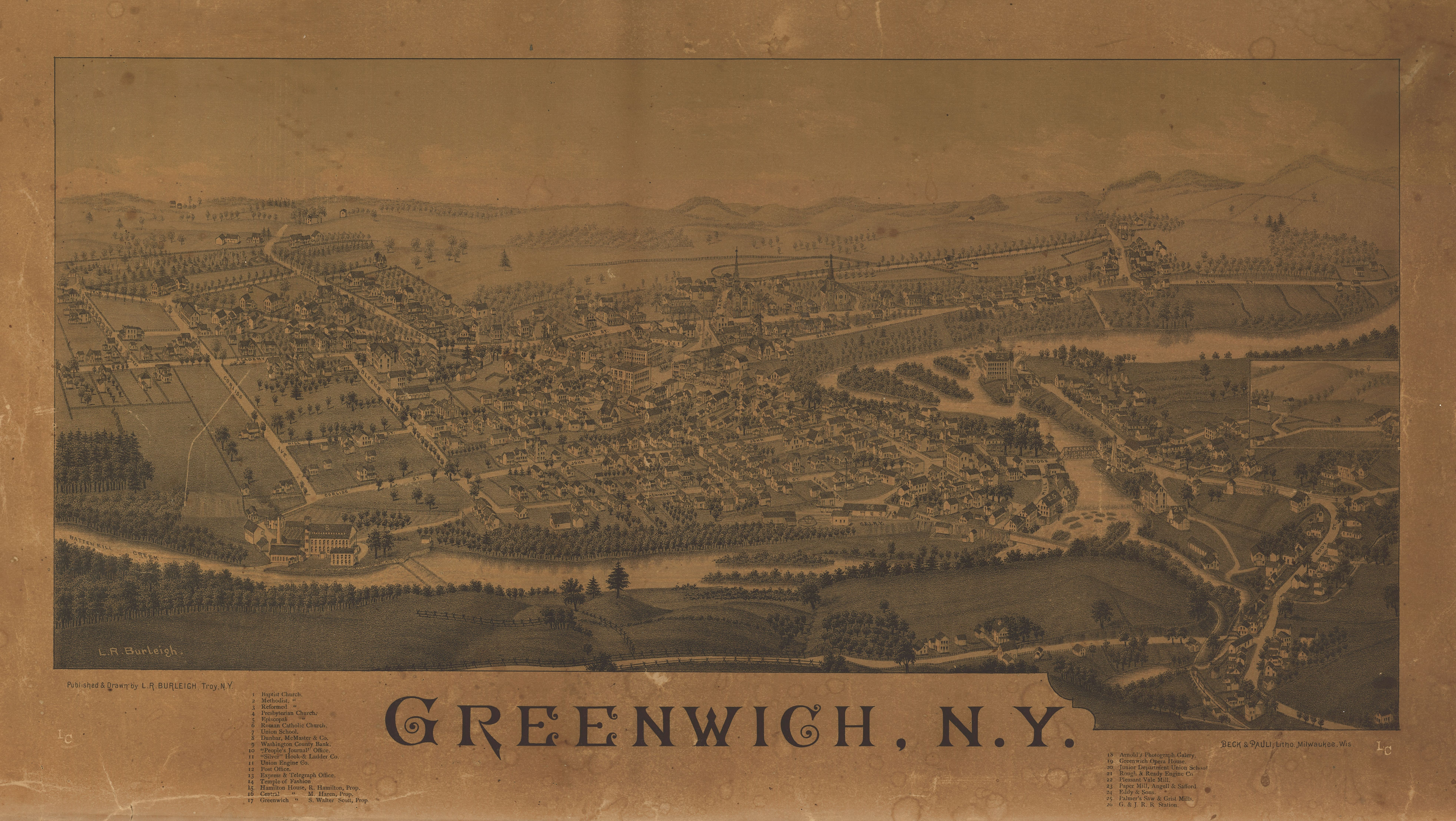
Perspective map of Greenwich with list of landmarks from 1885 by L.R. Burleigh

White families began settling the area around 1763. The town was originally part of five land patents: Saratoga, Kettlehuyn, Cuyler, Campbell, and Argyle. The Town of Greenwich was formed from part of the Town of Argyle in 1803. In 1809, the community of Whipple City incorporated as a village and adopted the name Union Village. In 1867, the name was changed to Greenwich.

Greenwich views itself as having been an important location along the Underground Railroad. A historical marker was placed in Mowry Park detailing the locations of former safe houses.

The Greenwich and Johnsonville Railroad brought rail service to the area in 1870.

The Coffin Site was listed on the National Register of Historic Places in 1980.

== Geography ==
According to the United States Census Bureau, the town has a total area of 44.4 square miles (114.9 km^{2}), of which 44.0 square miles (114.0 km^{2}) is land and 0.4 square mile (0.9 km^{2}) (0.81%) is water.

It lies within the Cambridge valley region in between the Adirondack Mountains and Green Mountain Range of Vermont.

The western town line is defined by the Hudson River, with Saratoga County on the opposite shore.

New York State Route 40 (NY 40) is a north–south highway passing through the center of the town. NY 29 is an east–west highway located near the southern town line and Batten Kill River. NY 40 and NY 29 join near Middle Falls.

== Demographics ==
Historical population
| Census | Pop. | Note | %± |
|---|---|---|---|
| 1820 | 3,197 | | — |
| 1830 | 3,850 | | 20.4% |
| 1840 | 3,382 | | −12.2% |
| 1850 | 3,803 | | 12.4% |
| 1860 | 3,941 | | 3.6% |
| 1870 | 4,030 | | 2.3% |
| 1880 | 3,860 | | −4.2% |
| 1890 | 4,196 | | 8.7% |
| 1900 | 4,172 | | −0.6% |
| 1910 | 4,227 | | 1.3% |
| 1920 | 4,268 | | 1.0% |
| 1930 | 3,872 | | −9.3% |
| 1940 | 3,766 | | −2.7% |
| 1950 | 3,811 | | 1.2% |
| 1960 | 3,969 | | 4.1% |
| 1970 | 4,177 | | 5.2% |
| 1980 | 4,276 | | 2.4% |
| 1990 | 4,557 | | 6.6% |
| 2000 | 4,896 | | 7.4% |
| 2010 | 4,942 | | 0.9% |
| 2020 | 4,868 | | −1.5% |
U.S. Decennial Census

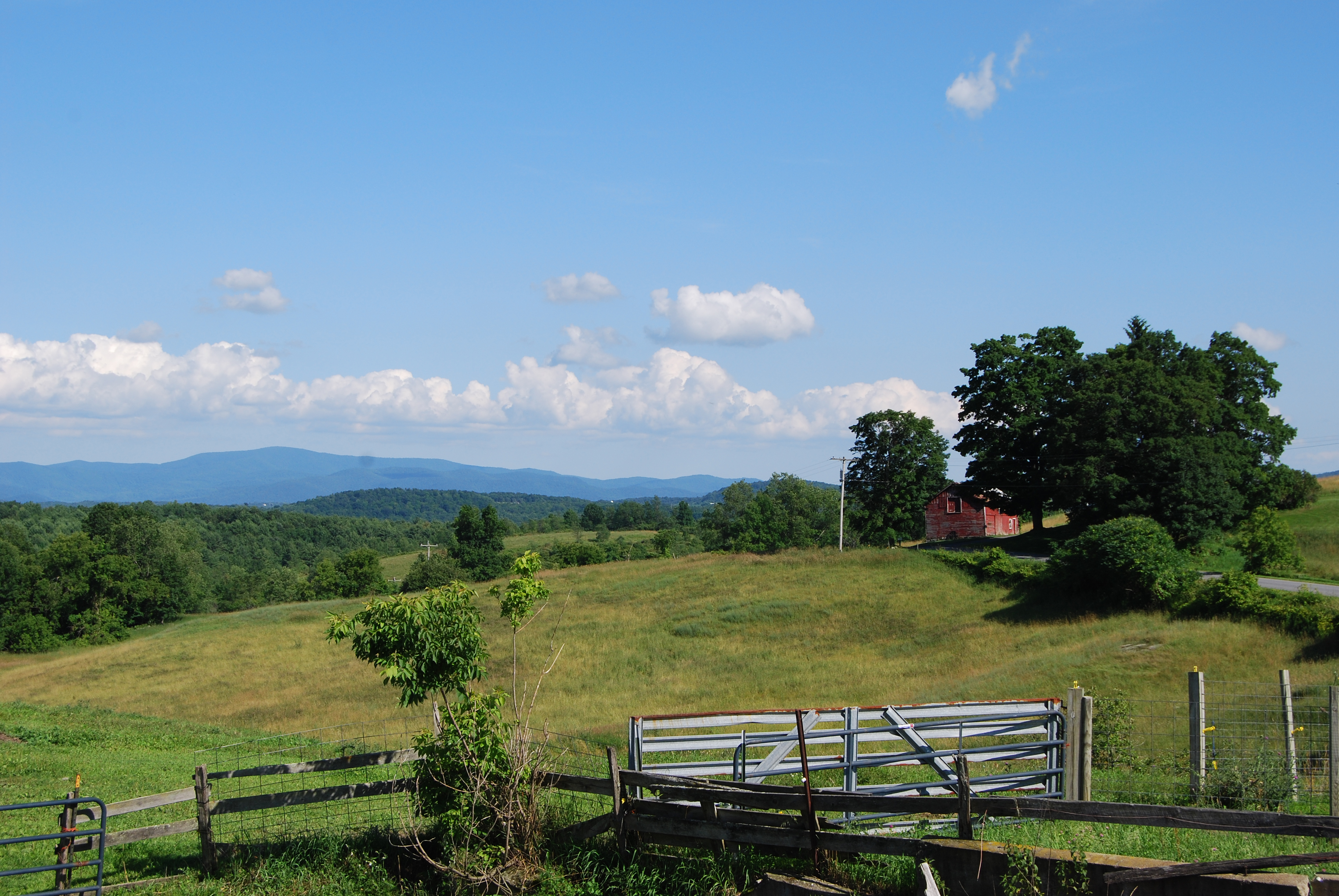
A farm in Greenwich

As of the 2020 census, there were an estimated 4,868 people and 2,262 households residing in the town. The racial makeup of the town was 92.89% White, 0.39% Black or African American, 0.16% Native American, 0.63% Asian, 0.1% Pacific Islander, 0.70% from other races, and 5.12% from two or more races. Hispanic or Latino of any race were 1.91% of the population.

The median age in Greenwich at the time of the 2020 census was 45.8 with 17.2% of the population under the age of 18 and 10.3% over the age of 65.

The median household income in the town was $74,000. Married-couple families had a median household income of $104,375 while median family household income was $95,075 and median non-family household income was $59,293. About families 4.3% of the population were below the poverty line, including 1.8% of those under age 18 and 7.6% of those age 65 or over.

== Education ==
A majority of Greenwich falls within the Greenwich Central School District. The district has three school buildings on 108 acres (0.44 km^{2}) of land. It serves around 1,300 students and employs 99 administrators and teachers. It was established in 1945 as a consolidation of rural school districts with the union free school district in Greenwich village. Small areas of Greenwich fall within the Schuylerville, Argyle, and Salem Central school districts. The school district is currently ranked #1,756 in the country according to U.S. News & World Report in 2014 earning a Silver medal award. The school district is currently ranked #10 in the Capital District according to the Capital District Business Review.

The Adirondack School of Northeastern New York provides private secondary education for grades 7 through 12.

== Notable people ==
- Susan B. Anthony - Civil rights activist spent her childhood in Greenwich.
- Chester A. Arthur - Lived in Greenwich for five years in his youth before becoming 21st President of the United States.
- John Lourie Beveridge - Born in Greenwich in 1824, Brigadier General in Civil War and subsequently became 16th Governor of Illinois.
- LeRoy Earl Brophey Sr. - Minnesota state reptresentative and lawyer
- Henry T. Clarke, Sr. - Nebraska territorial legislator
- George Henry Corliss - Inventor of the Corliss steam engine; grew up in Greenwich.
- David Edward Cronin - Painter and illustrator was born in Greenwich.
- Laura Don, born Anna Laura Fish - actress-manager and playwright, died at her parents' Greenwich residence in 1886.
- Kim Gannon - Trained as a lawyer, became a lyricist and co-wrote the holiday favorite I'll Be Home for Christmas. Returned to Greenwich and is buried here.
- David Greenberger - Visual, performing, and recording artist, creator of The Duplex Planet, currently residing in Greenwich.
- Daniel Hall - Wisconsin state legislator.
- Hal Ketchum - Country music star and member of the Grand Ole Opry was born in Greenwich.
- James Howard Kunstler - American author, social critic, public speaker, and blogger currently residing in Greenwich.
- Grandma Moses - Renowned American folk artist; was born on a farm in the Town of Easton.
- Phantogram (band) - electronic music duo, formed in Greenwich.
- James Hutchinson Woodworth - 12th Mayor of Chicago, Illinois.

== Communities and locations in the town ==
=== Communities and inhabited locations ===
- Bald Mountain – A hamlet west of the mountain by the same name in the western part of the town. A former lime "mining town", the hamlet is known more today for its farming than its mining.
- Battenville – A hamlet on the southern town line, located by the Batten Kill.
- Carters Pond State Wildlife Management Area – A conservation area in the vicinity of Carter Pond, south of Cassayuna.
- Cossayuna – A hamlet located south of Cossayuna Lake in the northern part of the town. Originally known as Hog Hollow and later as Lakeville, the hamlet was settled in 1765 and was likely its first center of trade.
- Center Falls – A hamlet (previously known as Franklin and as Hardscrabble) east of Greenwich village on NY 29 by the Batten Kill.
- Clarks Mills – A hamlet in the southwestern corner of the town by the Batten Kill.
- East Greenwich – The town's oldest hamlet, located in the southeastern part of the town located along the Batten Kill. Once known as Slab City, it has been home to several factories.
- Greenwich – A village at the south town line and Batten Kill. The village is partially in Greenwich and partially in the town of Easton.
- Middle Falls – A hamlet west of Greenwich village on NY 29. Though it once bore the names Arkansaw and Galesville, the hamlet has been known by its present name since 1875. The name is derived from a 45-foot (14 m) natural waterfall of the nearby Batten Kill.
- North Greenwich – A hamlet near the northern town line. The community was formerly known as Antioch and Reid's Corners. The hamlet played an important role in the early town. A school was built circa 1800 and a post office was established in 1850. The hamlet served as a stagecoach stop between Albany and Whitehall.
- Thomson – A hamlet northwest of Clarks Mills, by the Hudson River. The hamlet's notoriety has transitioned since its establishment from that of saw milling to paper milling.

=== Geographical features ===
- Batten Kill – A river that defines the southern town line.
- Cossayuna Lake – A lake on the northern town line. Its eastern shore defines part of the town's northern border. Lying mostly in the town of Argyle, only a small portion of the lake, its southern tip, lies within Greenwich.
- Hartshorn Brook – A tributary of the Batten Kill.
- McDougall Lake – A small lake, also partially within the town of Salem.
- Slocum Creek – A small tributary of the Hudson River.
