= Napierville Junction Railway =

Canadian rail company

Overview
- Locale: New York and Quebec
- Dates of operation: 1906–

Technical
- Track gauge: 4 ft 8 1/2 in (1,435 mm)
- Length: 28.4 miles

The Napierville Junction Railway is a railway company in Canada and a non-operating subsidiary of Canadian Pacific Kansas City. It was originally formed by the Delaware & Hudson Railway (D&H) in 1906. Its purpose was to provide the easiest and fastest line with minimal grades from Rouses Point, NY, to a point near Montreal (St. Constant Jct, QC, now Delson, QC), selected for its good connections to both of the city's main passenger terminals.

Until the end of September 1917, the D&H used the connection over the Grand Trunk Railway's Victoria Bridge into Bonaventure Station. At Delson a junction also exists with the Canadian Pacific Railway (CPR) via the St. Lawrence Bridge into Windsor Station, used by the D&H from October 1, 1917 until the end of passenger service in 1971, and by Amtrak's Adirondack between 1974 and 1986.

At its opposite end at Rouses Point, NY, the railway continued onto the D&H's Canadian Main line toward Schenectady, NY.

== Operation ==
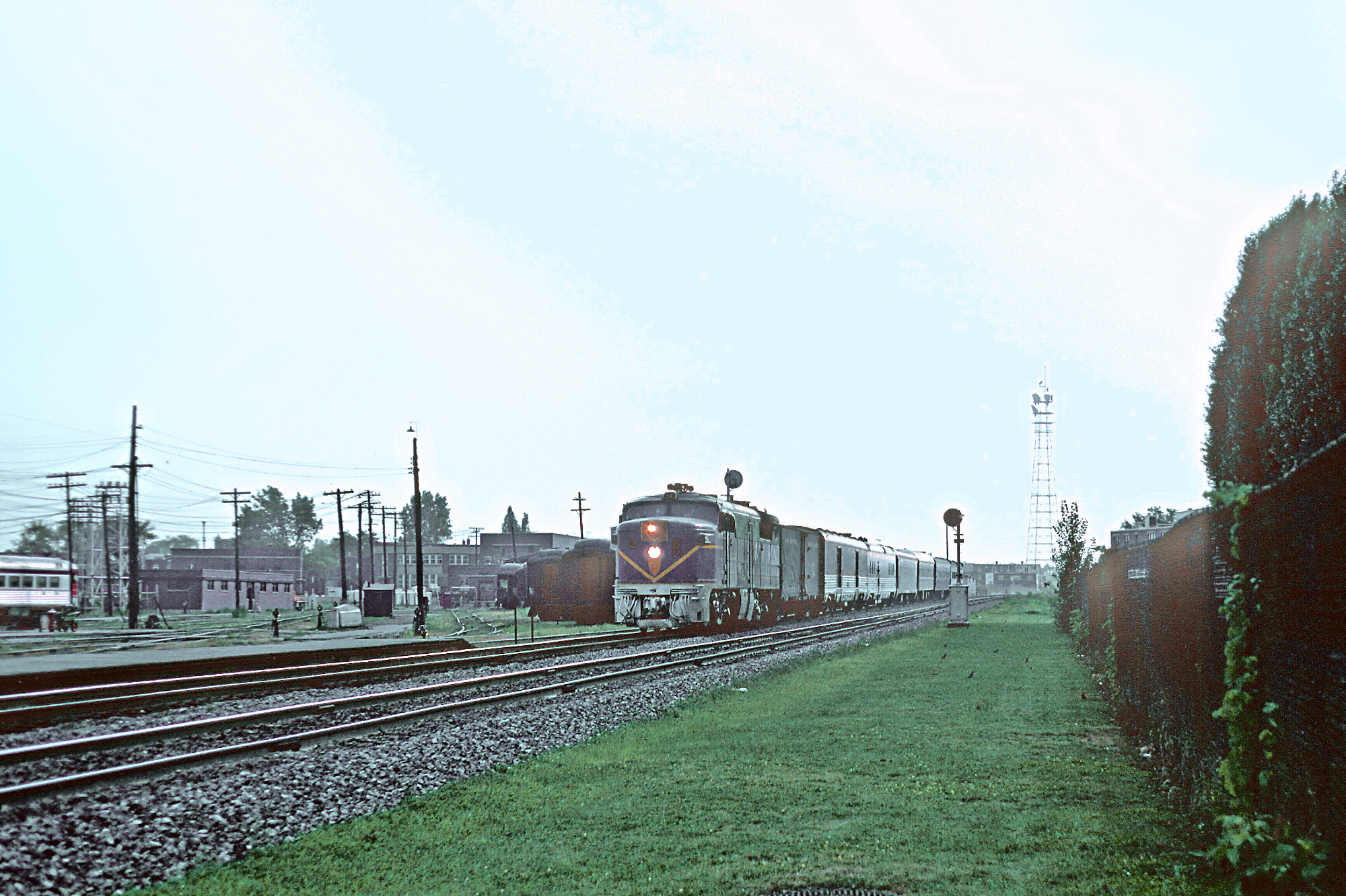
The D&H / NJR Laurentian on CPR rails at Westmount, Quebec in September 1968

Starting in 1967, the Napierville Junction Railway had two MLW RS-2 locomotives and 4 cabooses which served to pull consists from Upper New York State to Montreal, QC. For clearing the train crew through customs and passengers, the Lacolle railway station in Lacolle, Quebec, (7 miles from the NY state border) served as the stop for the NJR. From customs to maintenance this was the NJR's operating office, which then led to the Delaware and Hudson headquarters in Albany, NY.

The Canadian Pacific Railway assumed control of the Napierville Junction Railway along with the Delaware and Hudson in 1991. The Napierville Junction Railway's line between Rouses Point and Delson is called the Lacolle Subdivision.

== Preservation ==
Although the entire NJR route is still in service, very few traces of its Napierville Junction Railway heritage remain. One of their brown cabooses is displayed in Mooers, New York. Their locomotives were repainted as D&H in the 1970s.

== See also ==
- Napierville, Quebec
