= Syracuse, Phoenix and Oswego Railway =

Railway in New York

Overview
- Headquarters: New York, New York
- Locale: Woodard, north of Syracuse, New York to Fulton, New York
- Dates of operation: 1871–1889

Technical
- Track gauge: 4 ft 8 1/2 in (1,435 mm) standard gauge

The Syracuse, Phoenix and Oswego Railroad was chartered on November 29, 1871, and had a route from Woodard, located north of Syracuse, New York, to Fulton, New York, a distance of 17.11 miles (27.54 km). They merged with the Syracuse Northwestern Railroad on June 10, 1875, and incorporated as Syracuse, Phoenix and Oswego Railway on February 16, 1885.

In 1889, the railroad line merged with Rome, Watertown and Ogdensburg Railroad until 1913, when the company became part of the New York Central and Hudson River Railroad which was renamed to New York Central Railroad in 1914.
