= Laurentian (train) =

Passenger train service between New York City and Montreal

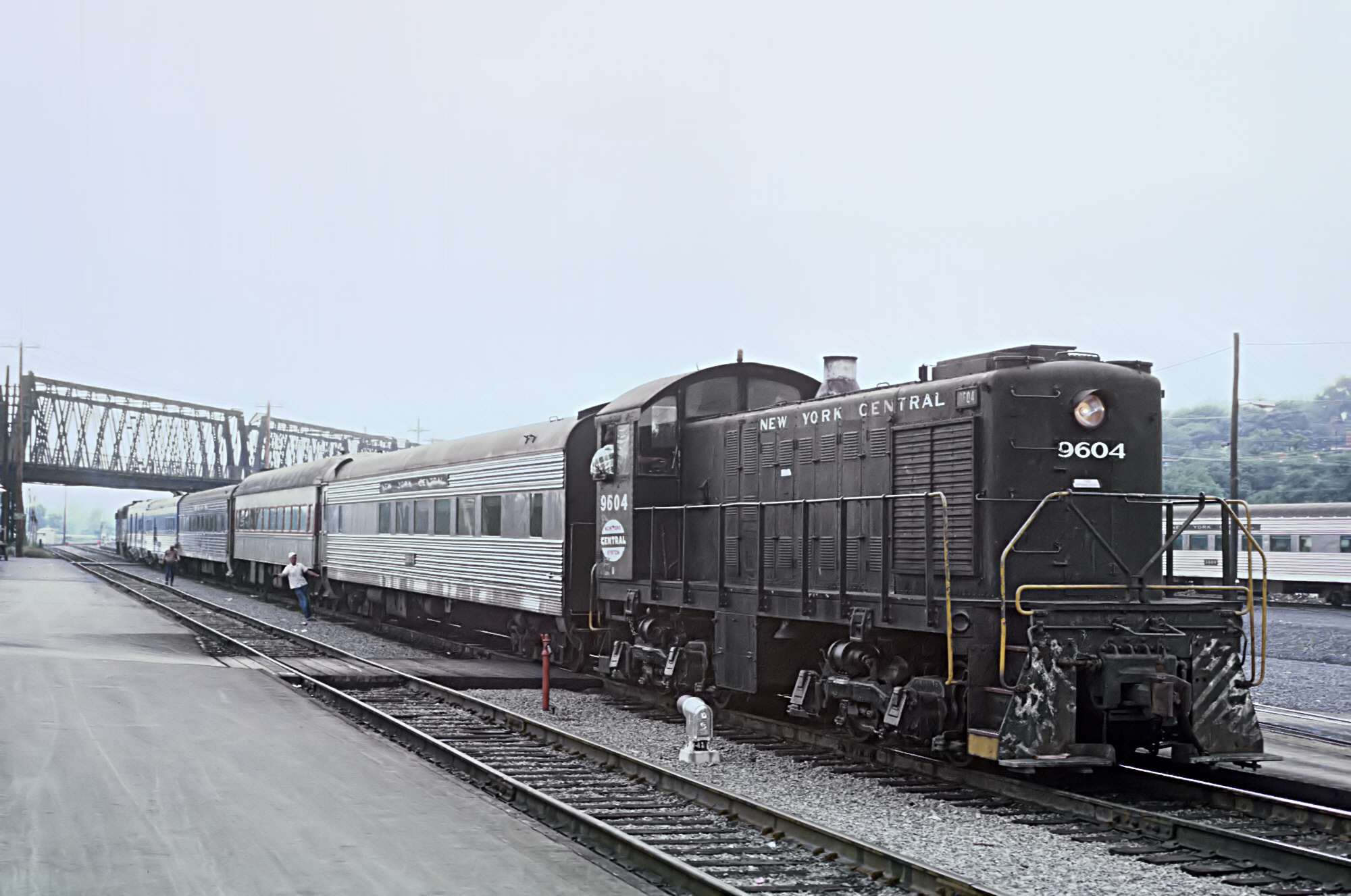
- A New York Central switcher with the Laurentian at Albany-Rensselaer in July 1969

Overview
- Service type: Inter-city rail
- Status: Discontinued
- Locale: Northeastern United States
- First service: 1923
- Last service: April 30, 1971
- Former operator: Delaware and Hudson Railway

Route
- Termini: New York City, New York; Montreal, Quebec
- Distance travelled: 375.4 miles (604.1 km) (1954)
- Average journey time: Northbound: 10 hrs 5 min Southbound: 10 hrs (1954)
- Service frequency: Daily
- Train numbers: Northbound: 35; Southbound: 34

On-board services
- Seating arrangements: Coach
- Catering facilities: Dining car

Technical
- Rolling stock: Streamlined passenger cars
- Track gauge: 4 ft 8 1/2 in (1,435 mm)

The Laurentian was a named passenger train operated by the Delaware and Hudson Railway between New York City and Montreal, providing same-day daylight service. The train used the D&H's famed route along Lake Champlain north of Albany, New York. The Laurentian, along with its overnight companion the Montreal Limited (#61 northbound/#62 southbound), was the flagship of the D&H from its inauguration in 1923 until its discontinuance on April 30, 1971. Since 1974, Amtrak has operated the Adirondack over the same route.

== History ==
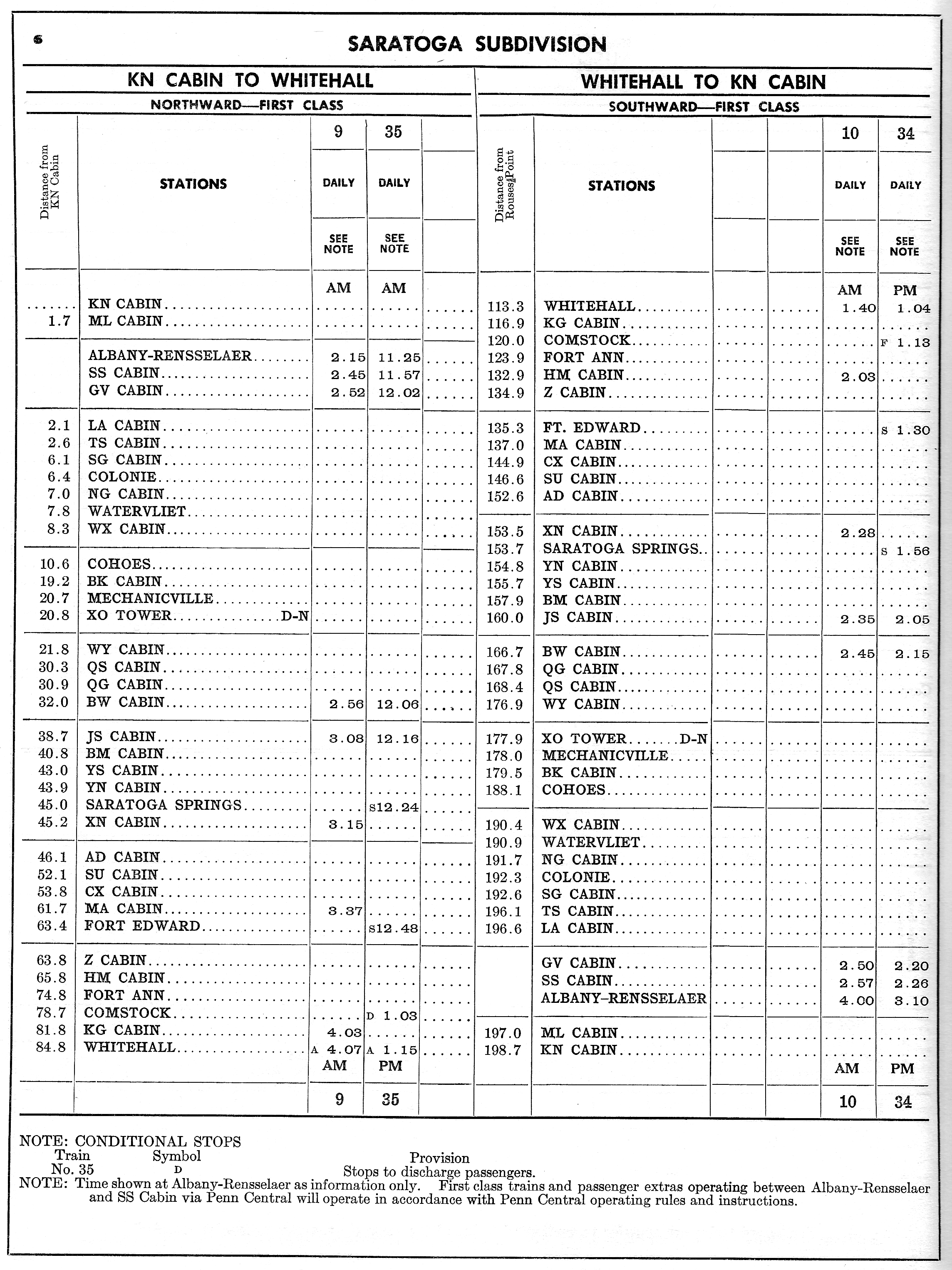
Delaware and Hudson Employee Timetable No.1, effective 2:01 AM E.S.T. Sunday, October 26, 1969, Page 6 showing the passenger trains of the Dumaine era, including Nos. 9/10 (the Montreal Limited, night train) and Nos. 34/35 (the Laurentian, day train) in the Saratoga Subdivision.

The D&H inaugurated the Laurentian in 1923 as a daytime service between New York City and Montreal, Quebec, via Albany and Lake Champlain. On the D&H section, steam locomotives pulled the train from its inception until 1953, when it received diesel equipment. The New York Central Railroad handled the train between New York and Albany. From the time of the NYC's merger with the Pennsylvania Railroad in 1968, the New York City to Albany segment was operated by the Penn Central. Altogether, the distance between New York City and Montreal was 375 miles (604 km).

=== Route ===
The train covered a New York Central route from New York City's Grand Central Terminal until crossing the Hudson River to the D&H station in Albany, then moving onto D&H tracks headed north to Watervliet and thence to Saratoga Springs. Thereafter, the train followed the route that has become the route of Amtrak's successor Adirondack, to Fort Edward, Whitehall, Ticonderoga, Plattsburgh and on to Canada. However, its night-time counterpart, the Montreal Limited (D&H #9, beginning the trip as NYC #61), took an express route from New York City to Troy, where it switched to D&H territory; then crossing the Hudson, straight through Saratoga without stopping, and made its next stop at the final U.S. city on the route, Rouses Point. Following the demolition of Troy Union Station, the night train added a Poughkeepsie stop and stopped at Albany instead of Troy; it also added a stop at Plattsburgh.

=== Demise ===
By 1964, the D&H, which showed little interest in passenger service after the Second World War, considered discontinuing the Laurentian, prompting an outcry from riders in upstate New York. The Laurentian survived and received an unlikely upgrade in 1967 at the hands of Frederic C. Dumaine, Jr., the D&H's new president and a proponent of passenger travel at a time when most railroads in the United States were scaling back or abandoning service altogether. The D&H acquired streamlined ALCO PA diesel locomotives from the Atchison, Topeka and Santa Fe Railway (ATSF) and passenger coaches from the Denver and Rio Grande Western Railroad (D&RGW). Repainted in the D&H's distinctive blue-silver-yellow livery, the Laurentian cut an impressive figure in its last years, and this equipment remained in use until the start-up of Amtrak on May 1, 1971. Amtrak declined to retain the New York-Montreal trains, and the Laurentian made its last run on April 30, 1971. In a rare move, however, Amtrak used D&H equipment between Albany and Montreal between 1974–1977 for its newly-named Adirondack passenger service.
