= Delaware and Hudson Railway =

Railroad in the northeastern United States

- All steam rail lines owned by the Delaware and Hudson Company
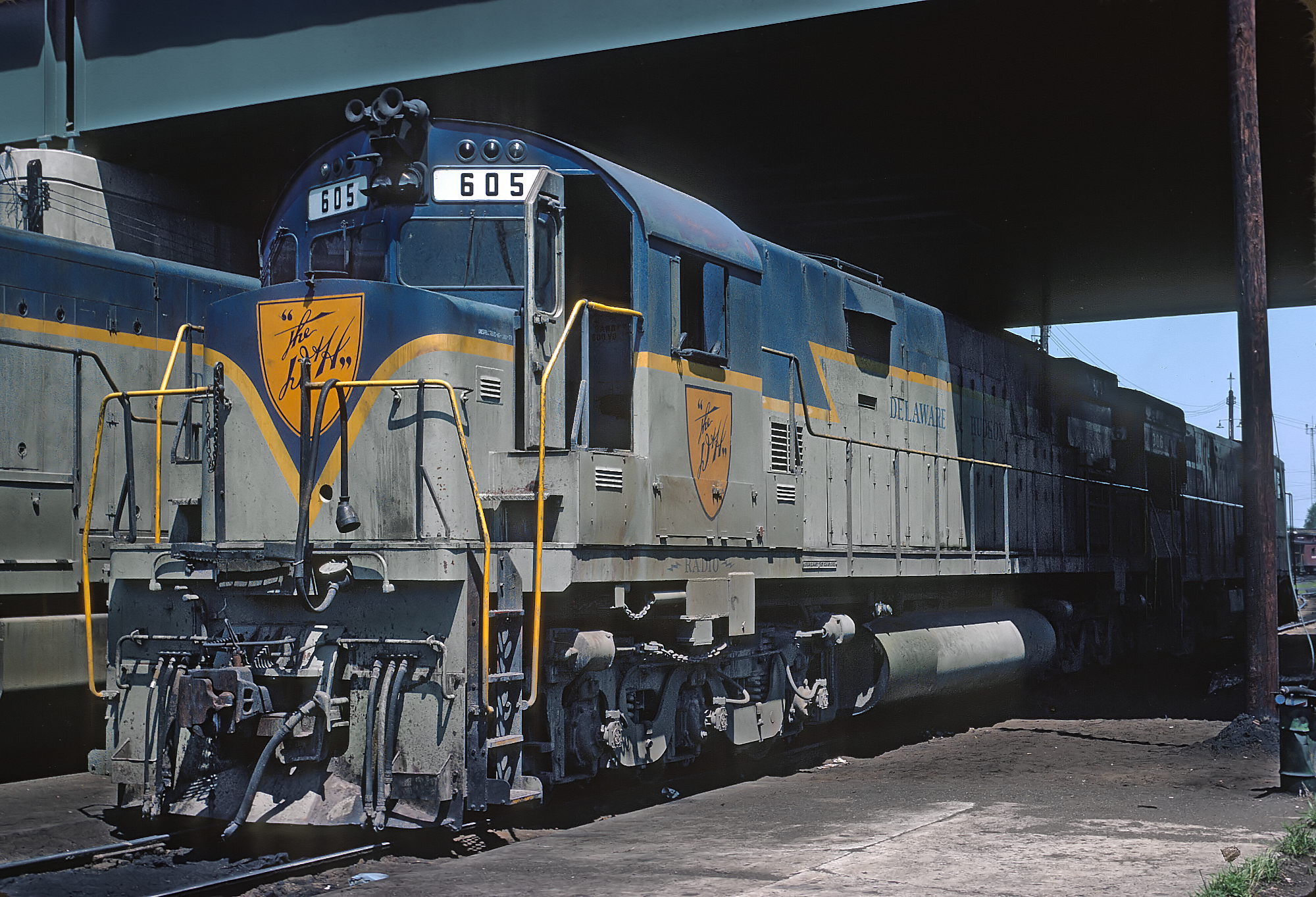
- DH 605, an ALCO Century 628, in Binghamton, New York

Overview
- Headquarters: Albany, New York, U.S.
- Reporting mark: DH
- Locale: Maryland, New Jersey, New York, Pennsylvania, Quebec, Vermont, Virginia
- Dates of operation: 1823–1991 (as D&H, present for CP, and later CPKC, ownership)
- Successor: Canadian Pacific Railway subsidiary Portion of lines sold to the Norfolk Southern Railway

Technical
- Track gauge: 4 ft 8 1/2 in (1,435 mm) standard gauge
- Previous gauge: 4 ft 3 in (1,295 mm) (see Stourbridge Lion)
- Length: 1,581 miles (2,544 km)

The Delaware and Hudson Railway (D&H) (reporting mark DH) is a Class 1 railroad that operates in the Northeastern United States. In 1991, after 168 years as an independent railroad, the D&H was purchased by the Canadian Pacific Railway (CP). The Delaware & Hudson is a wholly owned subsidiary of CP, which would itself become part of Canadian Pacific Kansas City in 2023. CPKC operates the D&H under its Soo Line Corporation subsidiary, which also operates Soo Line Railroad.

D&H's name originates from the 1823 New York state corporation charter listing "The President, Managers and Company of the Delaware & Hudson Canal Co." authorizing an establishment of "water communication" between the Delaware River and the Hudson River.

Nicknamed "The Bridge Line to New England and Canada," the D&H connected New York with Montreal and New England. The Delaware & Hudson has also been coined as "North America's oldest continually operated transportation company." In 2023, the D&H turned 200 years old.

On September 19, 2015, the Norfolk Southern Railway completed its acquisition of the "D&H South Line", which is 282 miles (454 kilometers) long, and connects Schenectady, New York, to Sunbury, Pennsylvania. The D&H South Line consists of three rail lines, the Sunbury Line, the Freight Line, and the Voorheesville Runner (former Albany & Susquehanna Railroad Mainline between Delanson and Voorheesville, NY). The Nicholson Cutoff is located on the Sunbury Line, which was the former mainline of the Delaware, Lackawanna and Western Railroad.

== History ==
By the 1790s, industrializing eastern population centers were having increasing troubles getting charcoal to fuel their growing kilns, smithies, and foundries. As local timber was denuded, efforts to find an alternative energy source began. During a fuel shortage in Philadelphia during the War of 1812, an employee at the direction of industrialist Josiah White conducted a series of experiments and discovered a number of ways that anthracite coal could be successfully ignited and burned. The fuel had been seen more as a way to put out a fire than a fuel to build one up, so its use also had to overcome prejudice.

White and his partner Erskine Hazard founded the Lehigh Coal and Navigation Company, creating the Lehigh Canal, and inspiring the exploitation of anthracite deposits found by William Wurts in and around Carbondale, Pennsylvania, which led to the development of Scranton.

By 1824, the mills of White and Hazard, and the regular large boatloads of anthracite they proved they could supply, tipped the prejudice against anthracite in Philadelphia when the Lehigh River was damaged by flooding. The news of its rapid repair and restoration together with the fact anthracite stocks had for a time run down, but not out, establishing the reliable sourcing (Note: Reliability of the LC&N deliveries over the fumbles of the Lehigh Coal Mine Company) finished off the bias, as did the beginning of mine output reaching the Delaware basin markets due to the long delayed completion of the Schuylkill Canal. (Note: This was also a project backed by White and Hazard, with White sitting on its board.)

Wurts was a large thinker, and inspired his brothers to back forming a company to deliver the new fuel, anthracite, to New York City by building an ambitious canal to connect the Hudson River and the Delaware River, and both to the Coaldale coal deposits by chartering a Pennsylvania subsidiary corporation, the Delaware and Hudson Gravity Railroad, to bring coal to the Delaware and the new canal. This cable railroad would grow in importance and become the far-flung class I railroad, the Delaware and Hudson Railway.

=== Delaware and Hudson Canal Company ===
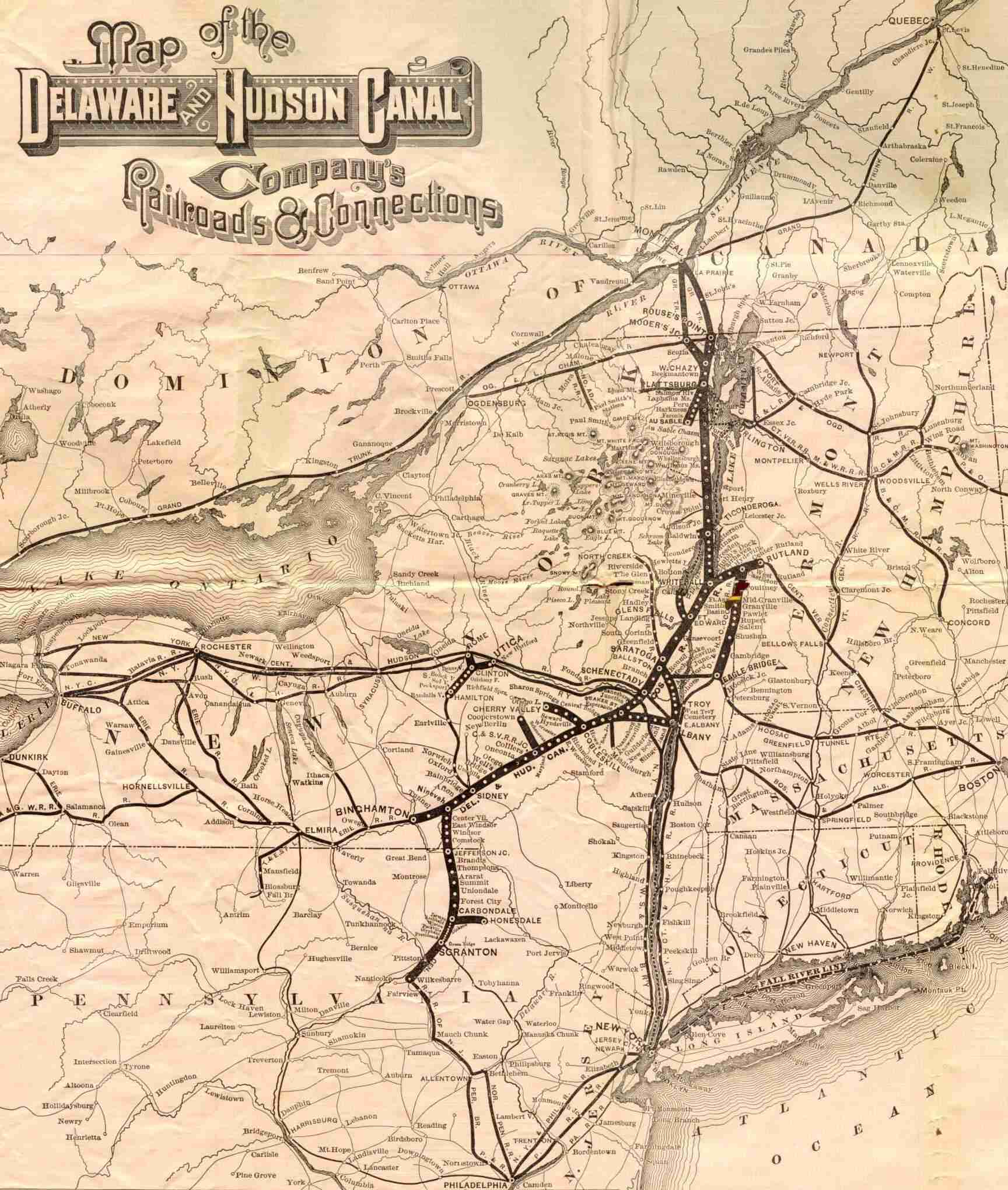
An 1886 map of the Delaware and Hudson Company's railheads and connections

In the early 1820s, Philadelphia merchant William Wurts, who enjoyed walking about along Amerindian paths, and what today what is termed taking nature hikes, had heard of possible anthracite in the area, so took a trip to explore the sparsely settled regions of Northeastern Pennsylvania. Finding coal outcrops, he immediately realized the value of the extensive anthracite deposits.

Returning to Philadelphia, he successfully interested his brothers in backing the idea of building a canal to make easier transporting coal to New York City. The city was still feeling the effects of the depletion of stands of woodlands providing heating and cooking firewood and also squeezed by continuing post-War of 1812 import restrictions on British bituminous coal, on which it had once been relying. The canal he proposed (the first sections of the Erie Canal, opened in 1821, creating news coverage) would also tie the developing industries along the Delaware to the Hudson, which helped raise financing.

At the time, nearly all the eastern cities were experiencing energy cost increases and difficulty in getting large quantities of fuel, as most nearby timber stands had been used up, often for charcoal production enabling foundries to start up, which now needed fuel to stay in business. This general condition around most long established cities and towns in the United States is one reason so much venture capital was raised for coal and coal transportation projects after 1823 and into the early 1840s, once Lehigh Coal & Navigation Company had blazed a way forward steadily increasing annual shipping to over a remarkable 28,000 long tons (28,000 t) (Note: The 1825 total may reflect parts of 1824 mine production stockpiled while the Lehigh Canal's severe flooding and ice damages were being repaired. But, the 2,300,000 long tons (2,300,000 t) figure conveyed in 1855 makes the matter of little moment.) by 1825. (Note: Note until the completion of the Delaware Canal, the Lehigh Coal & Navigation Company was forced to ship boats one way, and sell off the lumber in Philadelphia, so it had to constantly build new 'arks', which were hinged together to lengths of 110 feet (34 m), the Lehigh Canal locks built to 120 feet (37 m) minimum. There was no feasible way for a two-man barge crew to return such boat-trains against the current of the Delaware River over 60 miles back to the canal at Easton.)

The Delaware and Hudson Canal Company originates from the 1823 New York corporation charter listing the unusual name of "The President, Managers and Company of the Delaware & Hudson Canal Co." authorizing an establishment of "water communication" between the Delaware River and the Hudson River. The D&H was chartered by separate laws in the states of New York and Pennsylvania in 1823 and 1826, respectively, allowing William Wurts and his brother Maurice to construct the Delaware and Hudson Canal and the gravity railroad that served it. In January 1825, following a demonstration of anthracite heating in a Wall Street coffeehouse, the D&H's public stock offering raised a million dollars. At the time, the Lehigh Canal had established a reliable flow of increasing annual tonnages, and the industrial and heating uses of 'rock coal' were well established.

Ground was broken on July 13, 1825, and the canal was opened to navigation in October 1828. It began at Rondout Creek at the location known as Creeklocks, between Kingston, where the creek fed into the Hudson River, and Rosendale. From there, it proceeded southwest alongside Rondout Creek to Ellenville, continuing through the valley of Sandburg Creek, Homowack Kill, Basha Kill, and Neversink River to Port Jervis on the Delaware River. From there, the canal ran northwest on the New York side of the Delaware River, crossing into Pennsylvania on Roebling's Delaware Aqueduct at Lackawaxen and running on the north bank of the Lackawaxen River to Honesdale.

To get the anthracite from the Wurts' mine in the Moosic Mountains near Carbondale to the canal at Honesdale, the canal company built the Delaware and Hudson Gravity Railroad. The state of Pennsylvania authorized its construction on April 8, 1826. On August 8, 1829, the D&H's first locomotive, the Stourbridge Lion, made history as the first locomotive to run on rails in the United States. Westward extensions of the railroad opened access to new mines at Archbald in 1843, Valley Junction in 1858, Providence in 1860, and Scranton in 1863. Passenger service began west of Carbondale in 1860.

The canal was a successful enterprise for many of its early years, but the company's management realized that railroads were the future of transportation, and began investing in stock and trackage. In 1898, the canal carried its last loads of coal and was drained and sold. The next year, the company dropped the "Canal" from its name. The remaining fragments of the canal were designated a National Historic Landmark in 1968.

=== Delaware and Hudson Company ===
As railroads grew in popularity, the canal company recognized the importance of replacing the canal with a railroad. The first step of this was the Jefferson Railroad, a line from Carbondale north towards New York, chartered in 1864, financed by the D&H, built by the Erie Railroad in 1869, and opened in 1872. This was a branch of the Erie, running south from the main line at Lanesboro to Carbondale. Also built as part of this line was a continuation from the other side of the D&H's gravity railroad at Honesdale southeast to the Erie's Pennsylvania Coal Company railroad at Hawley. The Jefferson Railroad (and through it the Erie) obtained trackage rights over the D&H between its two sections, and the D&H obtained trackage rights to Lanesboro.

The other part of the main line was the Albany and Susquehanna Railroad, which was leased to the D&H on February 24, 1870 in perpetuality for $490,000 per year. The Delaware and Hudson already had a history of working with the Albany and Susquehanna, agreeing in 1866 to jointly build an extension to Nineveh and subsequently ship coal across the entire line. The connecting Lackawanna and Susquehanna Railroad, chartered in 1867 and opened in 1872, was also absorbed. The Albany and Susquehanna provided a line from Albany southwest to Binghamton, while the Lackawanna and Susquehanna split from that line at Nineveh, running south to the Jefferson Railroad, south of Lanesboro. Also leased in 1870 was the Schenectady and Susquehanna Railroad, connecting the Albany and Susquehanna at Duanesburg to Schenectady, opened in 1872 (reorganized as the Schenectady and Duanesburg Railroad in 1873).

On March 1, 1871, the D&H leased the Rensselaer and Saratoga Railroad Company, which, along with its leased lines, provided a network stretching north from Albany and Schenectady to Saratoga Springs, and continuing northeast to Rutland, Vermont, as well as an eastern route to Rutland via trackage rights over the Troy and Boston Railroad west of Eagle Bridge. The D&H also obtained a quarter interest in the Troy Union Railroad from this lease.

On March 1, 1873, the D&H got the New York and Canada Railroad chartered as a merger of the Whitehall and Plattsburgh Railroad and Montreal and Plattsburgh Railroad, which had been owned by the Rutland Railroad. This provided an extension, completed in 1875, north from Whitehall to the border with Quebec; a branch opened in 1876 to Rouses Point. Lines of the Grand Trunk Railway continued each of the two branches north to Montreal.

The D&H obtained trackage rights over the Lehigh and Susquehanna Railroad in 1886, extending the main line southwest from Scranton to Wilkes-Barre.

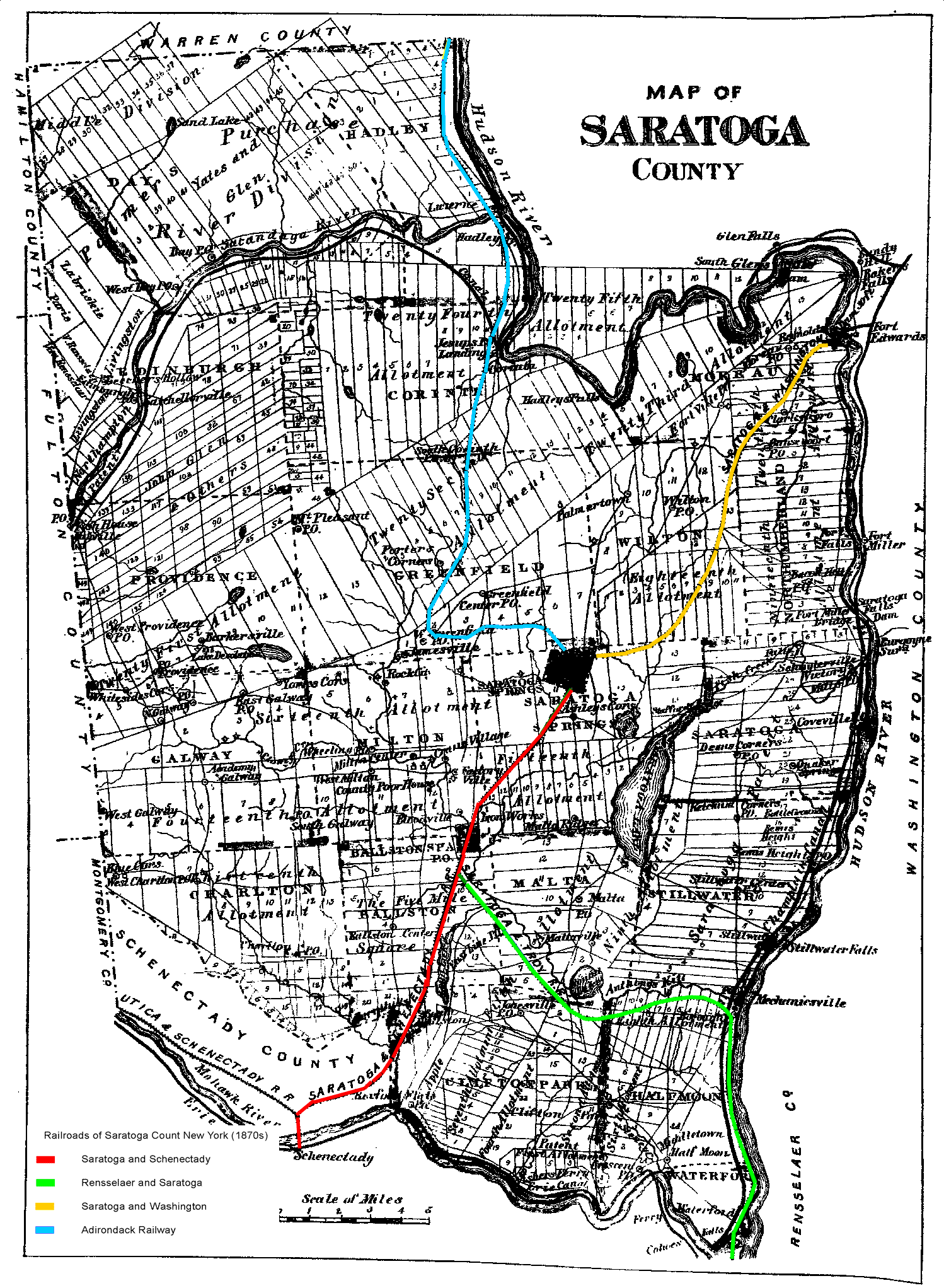
Railroad lines in Saratoga County before 1878; the Adirondack Railway is in blue

On July 11, 1889, the D&H bought the Adirondack Railway, a long branch line heading north from Saratoga Springs along the Hudson River. The 'Adirondack Railway' (originally Adirondack Company) was a railroad that connected Saratoga Springs to North Creek, New York, a distance of 62 miles (100 km). Built by Dr. Thomas Clark Durant, vice-president of the Union Pacific Railroad, it was started in 1864 and completed in 1871. After Durant's death, it was taken over by his son, William West Durant. The two companies officially merged on November 5, 1902. A stage-coach line was established to take passengers 28 miles (45 km) to Durant properties at Blue Mountain Lake and further by water to Raquette Lake. The Adirondack branch remained part of the D&H system and is still partially in use.

Upon gaining control of the Rensselaer and Saratoga Railroad Company in 1871, new repair shops were built north of Albany, New York at Green Island. The following year, shops and a locomotive terminal were added midway between Albany and Binghamton at Oneonta. For 40 years the Green Island Shops and Oneonta Shops were the primary back shops for the system.

Some company directors questioned the wisdom of acquiring extensive rail systems in northern New York. A direct line to Albany existed for many years through the canal and river system, so most of the coal markets in the area were already accessible. These concerns were overruled by the majority, who believed great benefit would accrue to having an all-rail route to Upstate New York that was not nearly as vulnerable to winter weather as the canal. Avoiding situations in which the company would have to rely on other railroads to reach its markets also would be desirable. The effort was helped by a report that estimated necessary upgrades to the canal would cost $300,000, an expenditure that would not be needed if rail routes could be purchased or leased.

A D&H newspaper advertisement for travel along the line, c. 1914

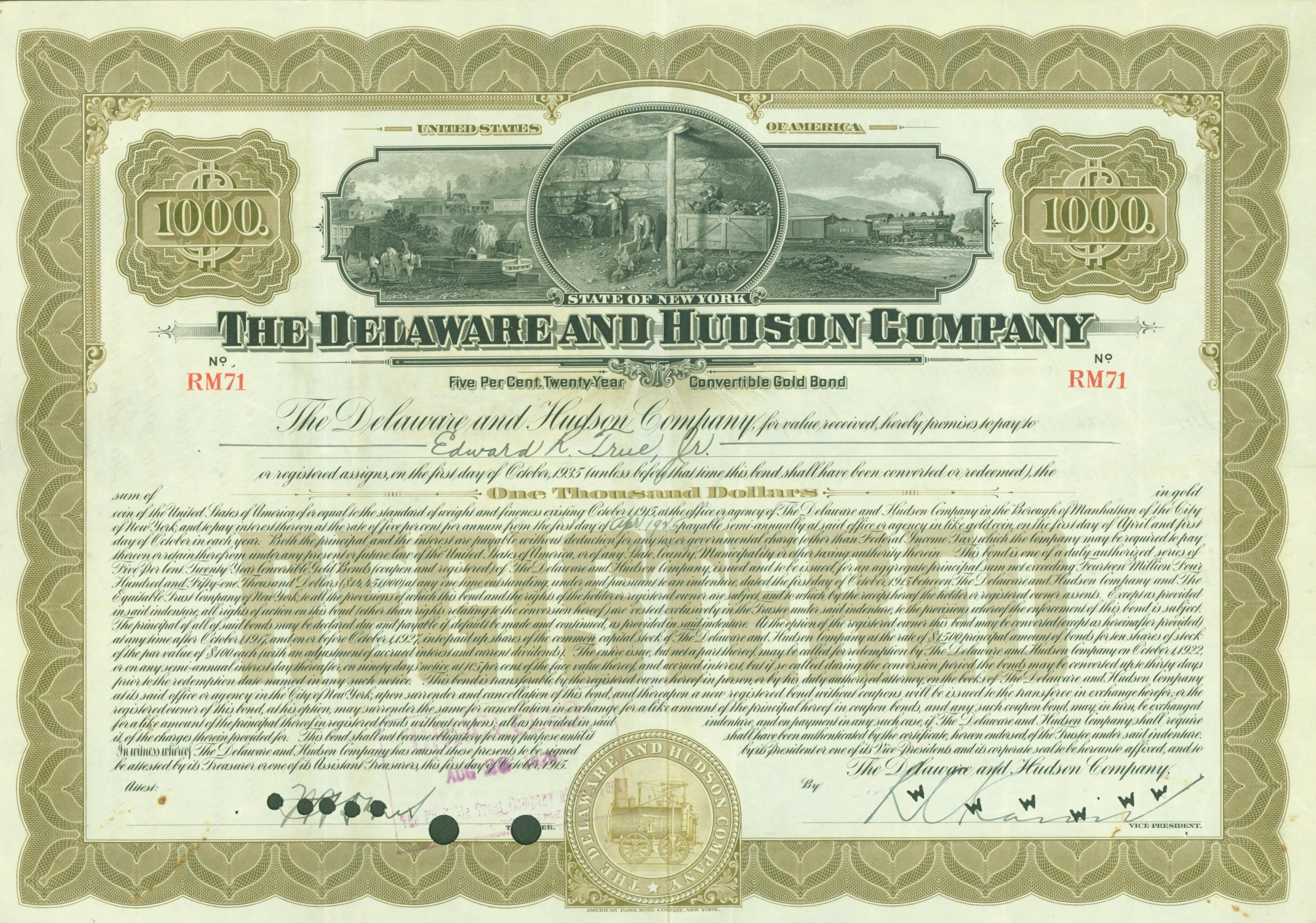
A gold bond of the Delaware and Hudson Company, issued October 1, 1915

The canal was last used on November 5, 1891, and the gravity railroad closed January 3, 1899. On April 28, 1899, the name was changed to the Delaware and Hudson Company to reflect the lack of a canal, which was sold in June of that year. Between Port Jackson and Ellenville, the right-of-way for the canal was used by the Ellenville and Kingston Railroad, a branch of the New York, Ontario and Western Railway, chartered in 1901 and opened in 1902.

In 1903, the D&H organized the Chateaugay and Lake Placid Railway as a consolidation of the Chateaugay Railroad, Chateaugay Railway, and Saranac and Lake Placid Railway. In conjunction with the Plattsburgh and Dannemora Railroad, which had been leased by the Chateaugay Railroad, this formed a long branch from Plattsburgh west and south to Lake Placid.

In 1906, the D&H bought the Quebec Southern Railway and South Shore Railway, merging them into the Quebec, Montreal and Southern Railway. This line ran from St. Lambert, a suburb of Montreal, northeast to Fortierville, most of the way to Quebec City. The D&H sold that line to the Canadian National Railway in 1929.

The D&H incorporated the Napierville Junction Railway in 1906 to continue the line north from Rouses Point to St. Constant Junction near Montreal, Quebec, from which the D&H obtained trackage rights over the Grand Trunk Railway to Montreal. This line opened in 1907, forming part of the shortest route between New York City and Montreal.

In 1912, the D&H and the Pennsylvania Railroad incorporated the Wilkes-Barre Connecting Railroad, creating an interchange between the two lines at Hanover Township, Pennsylvania, thus avoiding going through downtown Wilkes-Barre. Opened in 1915, this line runs north 6.65 miles to the D&H main line at Hudson, crossing the Susquehanna River twice.

Also in 1912, a new shop site was constructed to handle larger locomotives on the north side of Albany at Watervliet. Known as the Colonie Shops, they were constructed on 1,100 acres of land for $2.5 million and eventually employed 2,500. Thereafter the obsolete repair facilities at Green Island were downgraded.

On April 1, 1930, the property of the Delaware and Hudson Company was transferred to the Delaware and Hudson Railroad Corporation, incorporated December 1, 1928. In 1938, the D&H started to act as a bridge line, carrying large amounts of freight between other connecting lines.

After the Second World War the D&H, like all railroads in the United States, gradually curtailed passenger service. By 1957, the D&H had ended service between Albany and Lake George (via Fort Edward) and between Albany and North Creek (via Saratoga Springs) in the southeast part of Adirondack Park. The D&H had also ended service on its branch between Plattsburgh and Lyon Mountain during this period. By 1960, service consisted of the following trains: the daytime Laurentian and overnight Montreal Limited between New York City and Montreal, unnamed local trains between Albany and Rouses Point and Albany and Binghamton, and a commuter train between Albany and Saratoga Springs. The D&H discontinued the Rouses Point locals in July 1960, the Albany–Saratoga commuter train in late 1962, and the Binghamton train on January 24, 1963. The Laurentian and Montreal Limited remained in operation through the 1960s until April 30, 1971, when Amtrak thereafter assumed most long-distance passenger-train service. After more than three years of lapsed service, Amtrak introduced the daytime Adirondack over the D&H line on August 6, 1974.

=== Delaware and Hudson Railway (1968–1988) ===
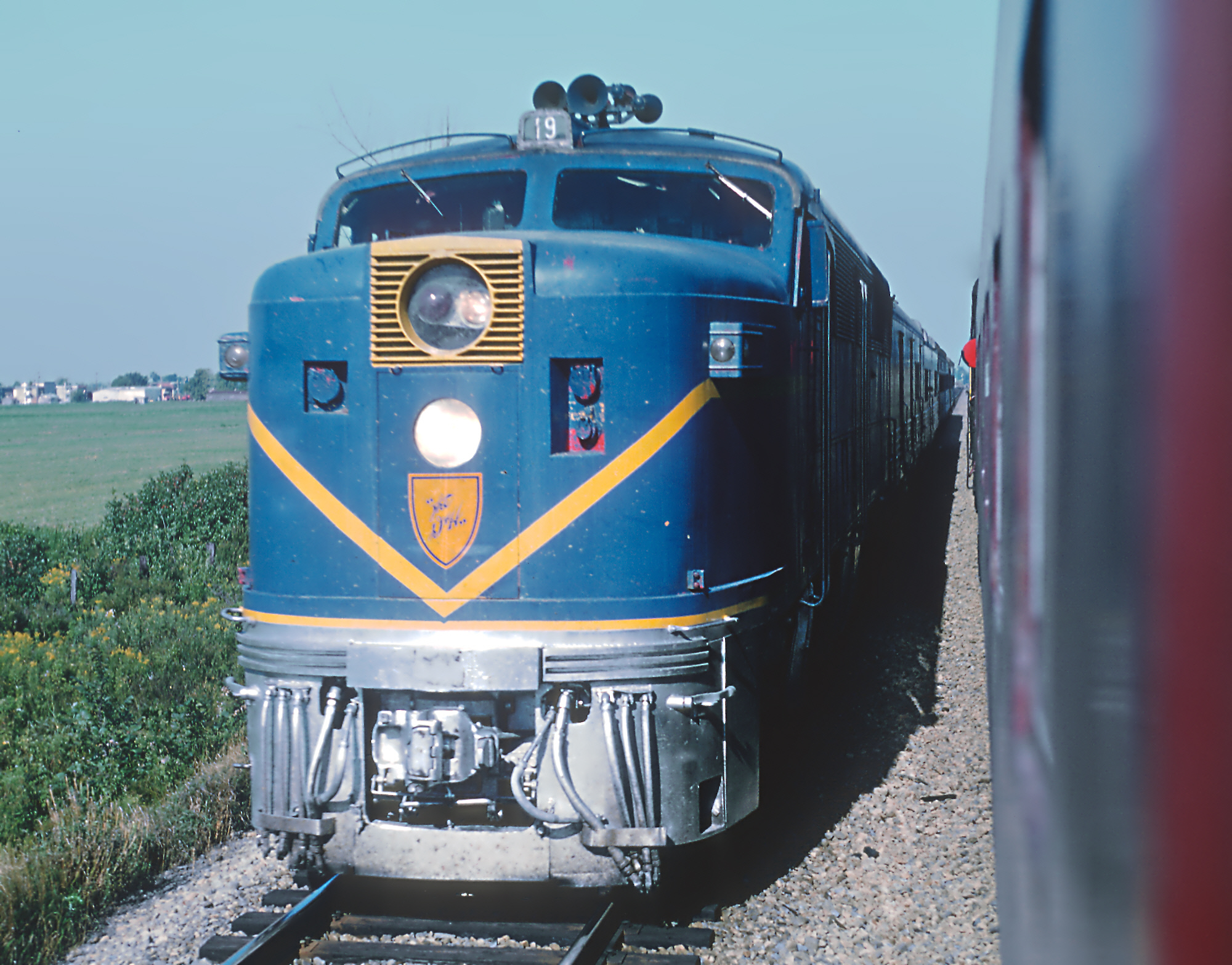
The Laurentian passing Train 9, The Montreal Limited, near Delson, Quebec, in September 1968

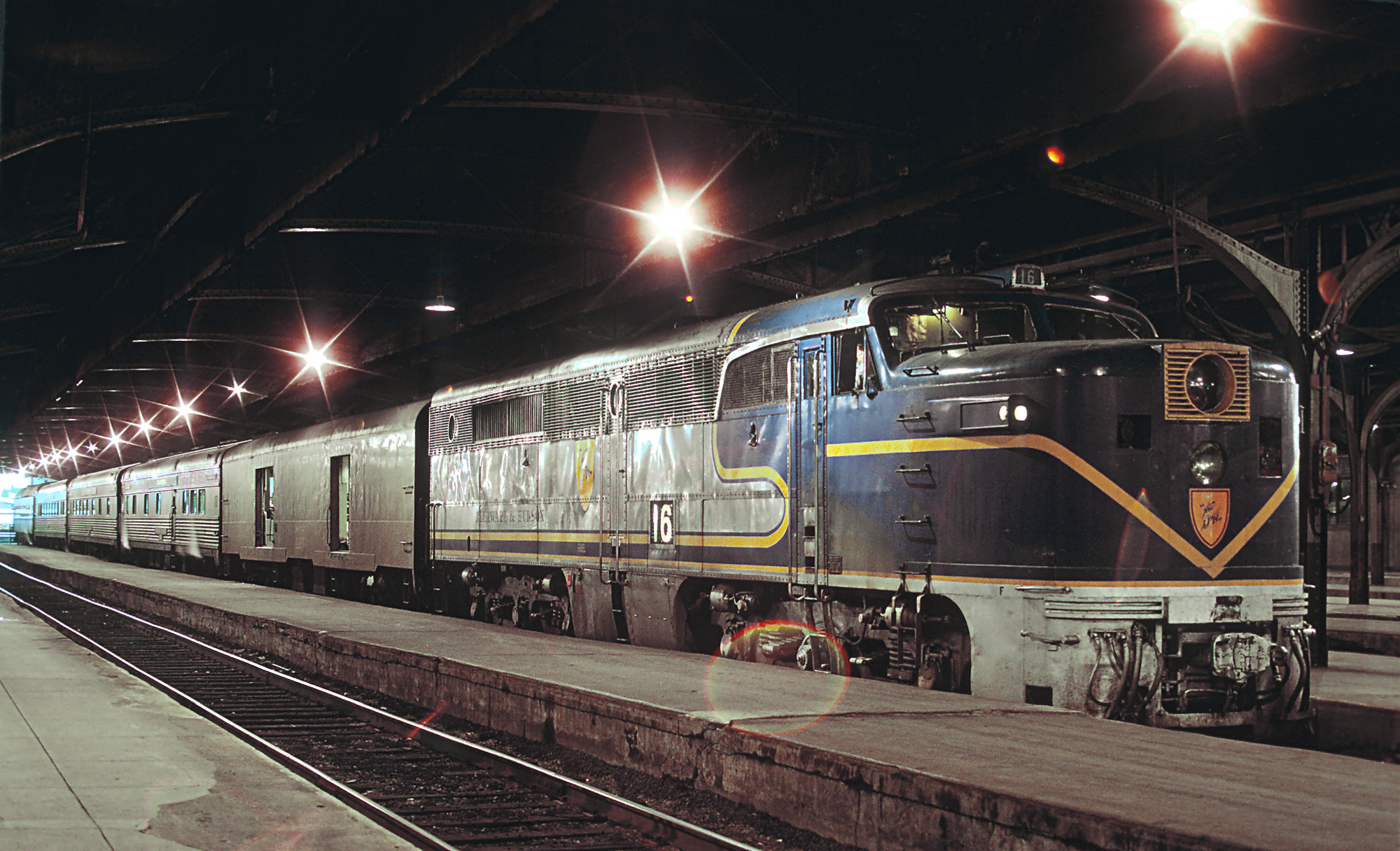
Delaware and Hudson's Montreal Limited at Windsor Station in Montreal, in August 1970

In 1964, Norfolk and Western Railway (N&W) filed an application to purchase the Nickel Plate Road and the Wabash Railroad. The Interstate Commerce Commission (ICC) approved their purchase, under the condition that they take over the D&H and the Erie Lackawanna Railway (EL). The N&W subsequently placed the EL and D&H under their new holding company, Dereco, and the D&H company was reorganized as the Delaware and Hudson Railway. Following the bankruptcy of numerous northeastern U.S. railroads in the 1970s, including EL, N&W lost control of Dereco stock. After several merger plans fell through, EL petitioned for and became included in the formation of the federal government's nascent Consolidated Rail Corporation (Conrail). The D&H was left out of Conrail to maintain a semblance of competition in the northeast. While the D&H was still owned by N&W, they were given no financial support and told to "sink or swim" as an independent railroad again.

In 1980, Conrail sold their former DL&W main line from Binghamton to Scranton to the D&H; being a more level and direct route to Scranton, this acquisition allowed the D&H to abandon its famed Penn Division between Carbondale and their former Erie/EL connection at Jefferson Junction. The success of this action has often been discredited, since the D&H was too small to compete with the services provided by Conrail, and the railroad doubled in size by gaining trackage rights over Conrail to Newark, Philadelphia, Buffalo, and Washington, D.C.. The remainder of the Penn Division from Lanesboro, Pennsylvania, to Nineveh, New York, was abandoned after the Belden Hill tunnel was enlarged in 1986.

In 1984, Guilford Transportation Industries purchased the D&H as part of a plan to operate a larger regional railroad from Maine and New Brunswick in the east, to New York City and the Midwest in the west, Montreal in the north, and the Philadelphia and Washington metropolitan areas to the south. Guilford paid for the D&H for $500,000, a price that reflected the D&H's poor financial problems and the poor condition of its physical plant. At the time of the purchase, the D&H had little remaining freight traffic, relying on federal and state money to continue operations. Guilford's plans for expanded operations did not come to fruition. On June 20, 1988, following two intense labor strikes, Guilford filed the D&H for bankruptcy, and they disbanded all of the D&H's operations and assets. Guilford stated that the D&H's assets were worth $70 million at the time of the bankruptcy. Lackawanna County, Pennsylvania, officials purchased the Carbondale-Scranton route, and it later began to serve a growing number of industries in the valley under the auspices of the designated operator, Delaware-Lackawanna Railroad.

The ICC opted to arrange for the D&H to be absorbed into Conrail. Walter G. Rich, the president and CEO of the New York, Susquehanna and Western Railway (NYS&W), quickly lobbied against the arrangement, since the D&H had a contract in place to jointly operate intermodal trains with the NYS&W and CSX Transportation. The federal bankruptcy court agreed to appoint the NYS&W to assume control of the D&H, until another buyer could be found. CSX provided financial support for the NYS&W's takeover, and they underwrote all financial losses from the D&H.

=== Canadian Pacific era (1991–present) ===
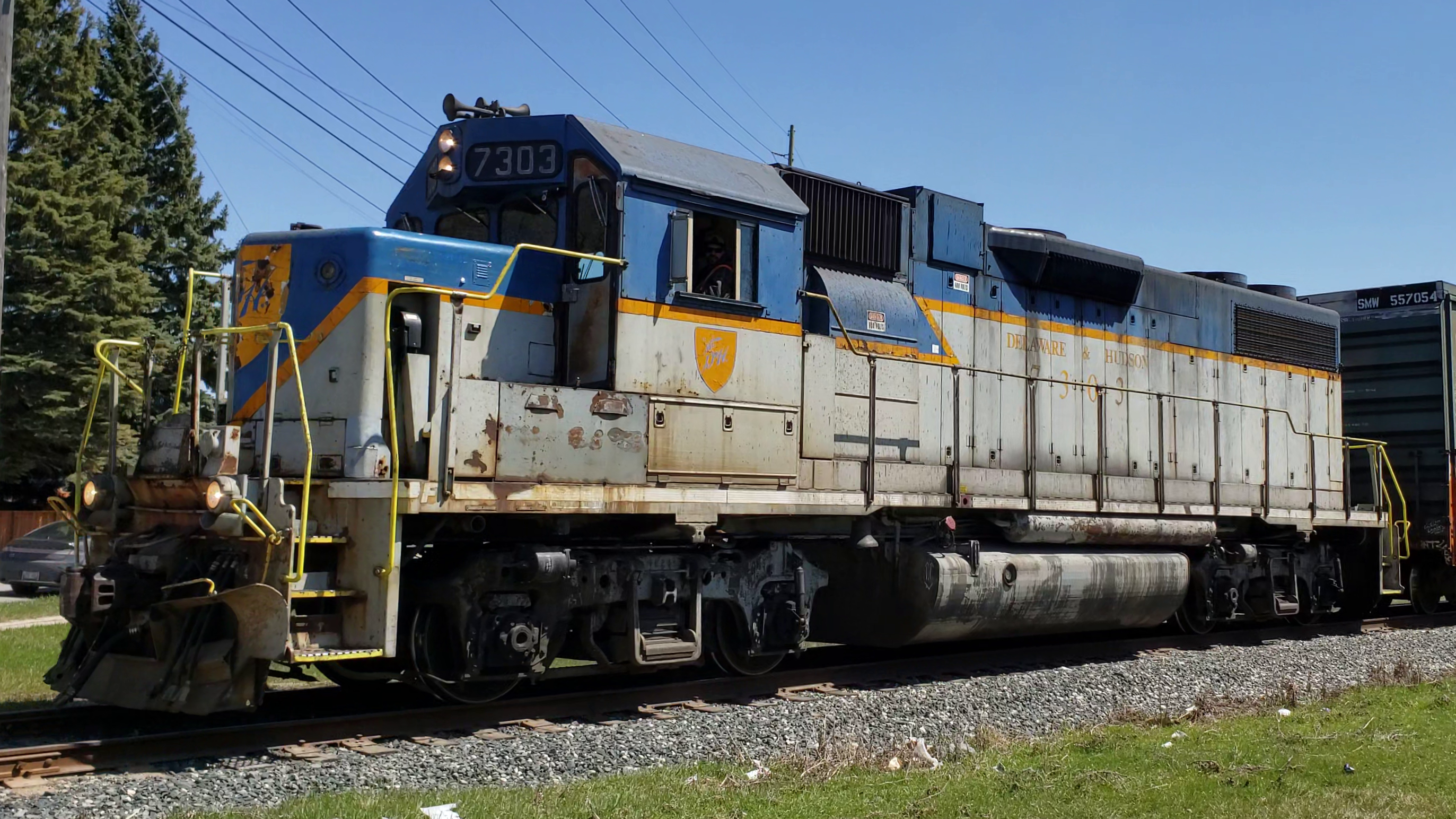
DH 7303, an EMD GP38-2, while under Canadian Pacific's ownership in Winnipeg

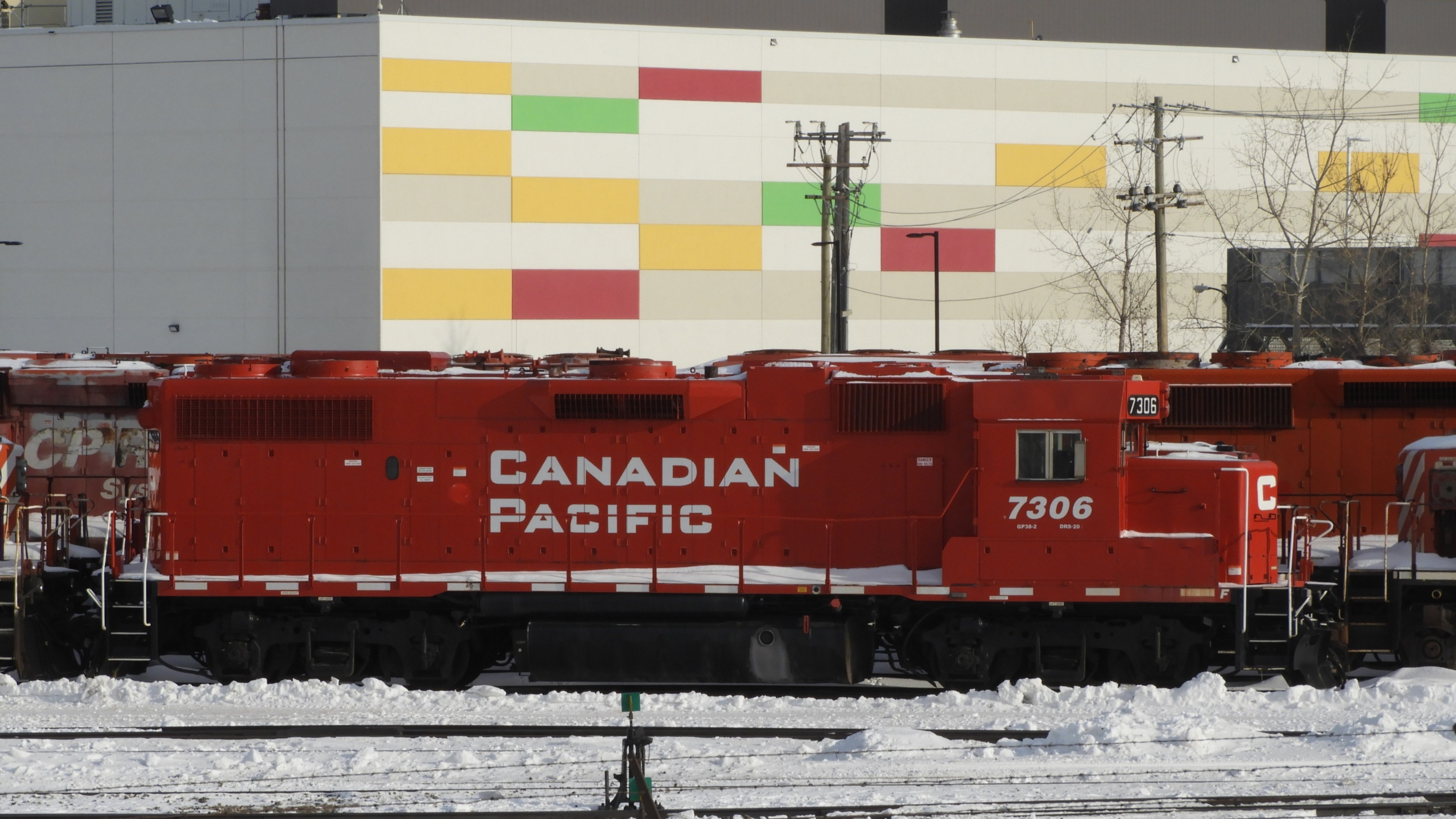
CP 7306, a repainted D&H locomotive, in Winnipeg in January 2019

In 1991, the Canadian Pacific Railway (CPR) purchased the D&H for $25 million to provide a connection between Montreal and the New York City area, for their transcontinental system. The CPR assumed all operations of the D&H system and eventually phased out the use of the D&H name and logos on locomotives or rolling stock. Under CPR, the D&H trackage was upgraded, and excess trackage was ripped up. The D&H briefly became profitable under CPR ownership, but by 1996, they experienced financial losses again. CPR quickly placed the D&H and other unprofitable trackage in the eastern U.S. and Canada into a separate subsidiary called the St. Lawrence and Hudson Railway. In 2000, the St.L&H was absorbed back into Canadian Pacific.

The D&H operated in some of the most rural areas of New York, and very few industrial customers between Binghamton and Rouses Point remain. However, the railroad's current prognosis is arguably better than it has been in a long time. Along with the New York City connection, haulage agreements with other railroads are greatly increasing traffic. CPR has been steadily using its high-power alternating current traction locomotives on its road trains on the D&H line, instead of its aging SD40-2 models. This is an indication of the increasing importance of reliable service. Also, major signal and track projects are underway to modernize the former D&H lines.

As of 2012, various trackage and haulage rights were assigned to the Norfolk Southern Railway (NS) over the D&H between Sunbury and Mechanicville, New York, as was a connection to Canadian National via Rouses Point, New York. NS incorporated the former bridge-line route into its "Patriot Corridor", and the majority of the traffic on the D&H became that of the NS.

In 2017, CPR finished installing an updated signaling system on the line. In 2018, CPR started doing extensive work on the line, possibly in preparation for increased traffic.

=== Partial lines purchase by Norfolk Southern ===
In October 2014, Canadian Pacific's Delaware & Hudson put a portion of its lines south of the Mohawk Yard in Glenville, New York, to Sunbury, Pennsylvania, and the former Albany Main from Delanson, New York, to Voorheesville, New York, up for sale. The former Albany & Susquehanna Railroad Mainline (also known as the Voorheesville Runner) is currently operated under contract by SMS Rail Services. Under the purchase agreement, CP/D&H would retain the Freight Mainline Sub from Mechanicville, New York, to South Schenectady, NY (Mohawk Yard), the Canadian Mainline from Rouses Point, New York, to connect with the Freight Main, and the Colonie Mainline from Mechanicville, NY to Albany, NY. The majority of the current traffic on the offered routes already consisted of NS Intermodal Containers and Auto Rack trains bound for Ayer, Massachusetts, via Pan Am Southern. On November 17, 2014, NS acquired the Schenectady, New York, to Sunbury, Pennsylvania, and Delanson to Voorheesville, New York, segments for $217 million. On September 19, 2015, NS assumed ownership and operations of its newly-purchased portion of the old D&H mainline.

== Legacy ==
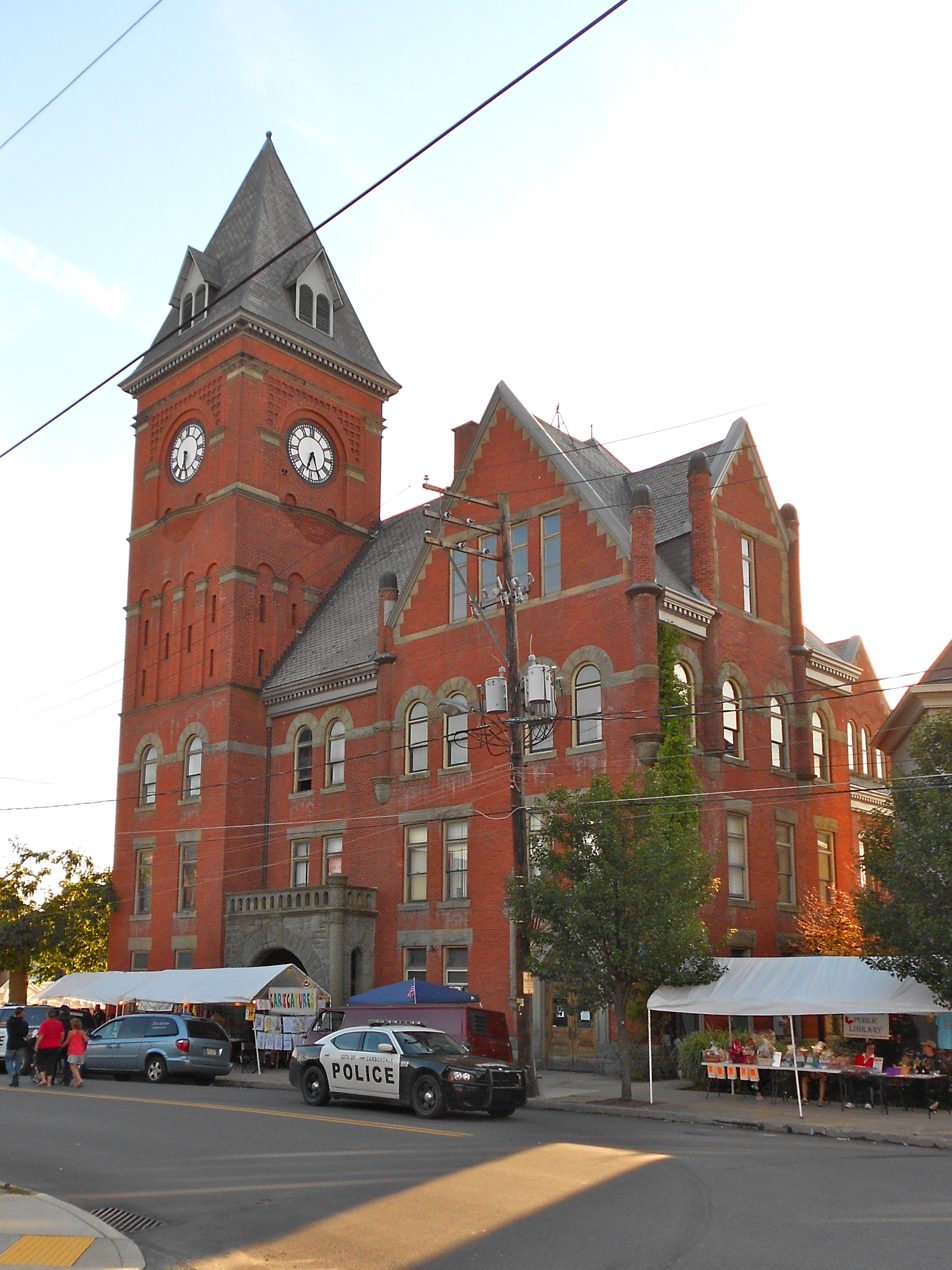
The Delaware and Hudson companies' transportation services enabled Carbondale, Pennsylvania, to become one of the first American mining centers that supplied the fuel that gave rise to the American Industrial Revolution.

The Delaware and Hudson was one of the longest-operating class I railroads in American history. In the 1930s, during the Great Depression, D&H President L.F. Loree ordered many of the railway's larger locomotives to be taken off the main line and serviced with the sole reasoning being to keep men working so they did not lose their jobs. Most of these engines were in excellent condition and did not need repairs. Also in 1939, the railroad experimented with welded rail before many other railroads.

The branch of the D&H that ran between Lake Village and Glens Falls, New York, was converted to the Warren County bikeway in several phases, starting in 1978 and finishing in 2000.

Amtrak's Adirondack and Ethan Allen Express trains also operate over former D&H trackage.

The Lyon Mountain Railroad Station at Lyon Mountain, New York, was listed on the National Register of Historic Places in 2002 and the Mediterranean Revival style Delaware and Hudson Passenger Station (1909–1911) at Lake George was listed in 2013.

The city of Delson in Quebec was named in honor of the D&H, which runs through the town. The origin of the name Delson comes from a contraction of "DELaware and HudSON".

The Village of Delanson, New York, through which the D&H's Susquehanna Division ran, was also named in honor of the D&H. The name was coined by D&H Superintendent C.D. Hammond in 1893 from the railroad's name DELaware ANd hudSON. The village served as a junction point for the railroad and was the location of a large coal pocket (storage yard).

== Subsidiaries and branches ==
- Napierville Junction Railway
- Greenwich and Johnsonville Railway
- Baltimore Coal & Union Railroad
- Northern Coal & Iron Company
- Plymouth & Wilkes-Barre Railroad and Bridge

== Locomotives ==
The Delaware and Hudson locomotive roster was particularly unique in having models from Alco, GE, EMD, and Baldwin. The Delaware and Hudson also served Alco's main plant at Schenectady, NY making it a popular road to spot Alco locomotives in operation.

Diesel Roster
Road Numbers	Model	Builder	Notes
16-19	PA-1 / PA-4	ALCo	All ex-ATSF
200-209	C-420	ALCo	
301-316	U23B	General Electric	
401	C-420	ALCo	
404-415	C-420	ALCo	
451-456	C-424m	ALCo / General Electric	
461-463	C-424m	ALCo / General Electric	
501-508	RS-3m	ALCo / Morrison-Knudsen	
601-618	C628	ALCo	
650-656	U33C	General Electric	
701-712	U30C	General Electric	
751-762	U33C	General Electric	
801-803	SD45	EMD	
1205, 1216	RF-16	Baldwin	
1776	U23B	General Electric	
1976	RS-3m	ALCo / Morrison-Knudsen	
2301–2316	U23B	General Electric	
3000-3032	S-2	ALCo	
3033-3050	S-4	ALCo	
4000-4025	RS-2	ALCo	
4026-4049	RS-3	ALCo	
4050-4051	RS-2	ALCo	
4052-4122	RS-3	ALCo	
4123 (1st)	RS-3	ALCo	
4123 (2nd)	RS-2	ALCo	
4124-4129	RS-3	ALCo	
5000-5011	RS-11	ALCo	
5012-5023	RS-36	ALCo	
7314-7325	GP38-2	EMD	
7401-7420	GP39-2	EMD	
7601-7620	GP39-2	EMD	

Steam Roster
Road Numbers	Whyte Notation	Class	Year built	Builder	Notes
Transit	2-2-4T		1889	Schenectady (pre-ALCo)	inspection engine
Saratoga	4-4-0		1904	D&H	inspection engine; rebuilt from class G-1c
3, 7	0-6-0T	B	1880, 1884	Dickson	
16	0-6-0	B-1a	1891	Dickson	
20-22	0-6-0	B-1b	1882–1900	Dickson	20 and 21 later converted to "camelback" tender engines
23-29	0-6-0	B-4	1902–1903	Dickson or D&H	
30-56	0-6-0	B-4a	1903–1907	ALCo	
80-87	0-8-0	B-5		Schenectady (pre-ALCo)	built from 2-8-0s
91-100	0-8-0	B-6		ALCo	built from 2-8-0s
151-164	0-8-0	B-7		ALCo	built from 2-8-0s
135	2-6-0	C-1e	1875	Dickson	
61, 63, 65, 75, 91, 93, 99, 101, 110-112	2-6-0	C-1i	1889-1891	Dickson	63 and 65 later converted to oil-burning
139, 142, 145	2-6-0	C-1j	1880-1881	Dickson	
58-60, 66, 67, 70-71	2-6-0	C-1k	1891–1893	Dickson	
119, 121-123, 179	2-6-0	C-1m	1889-1891	Dickson	
117-118	2-6-0	C-2	1889-1891	Rogers	
397 (orig. 148)	4-4-0	G-1c	1892	Baldwin	rebuilt into inspection engine "Saratoga" in 1904
423	4-4-0	G-3	1866	Danforth, Cooke	
424-426	4-4-0	G-3	1867	Dickson	
421	4-4-0	G-3	1871	Smith & Jackson	
422	4-4-0	G-3	1876	Danforth, Cooke	
374-378	4-4-0	G-4b	1883-1887	Dickson	
379	4-4-0	G-4b	1867	Schenectady (pre-ALCo)	
380-387	4-4-0	G-4b	1868-1889	Dickson	
391-393	4-4-0	G-4c	1895	Dickson	
388-390	4-4-0	G-4d	1895	Schenectady (pre-ALCo)	
432	4-4-0	G-4e		Schenectady (pre-ALCo)	
435	4-4-0	G-4e	1868	Schenectady (pre-ALCo)	
433-434	4-4-0	G-4e	1900	D&H	
442-457	4-4-0	G-5	1903-1904	ALCo	built as "camelbacks", later converted to single-cab
500-508, 557-561	4-6-0	D-3	1903-1907	ALCo (504-508 D&H)	
521-524	4-6-0	D-3a	1904	ALCo	
534-538, 559, 590-599	4-6-0	D-3b	1903-1907		590-599 convertible between oil- or coal-burning
600-609	4-6-2	P	1914	ALCo	
651-653	4-6-2	P-1	1929-1931	D&H (653 jointly built by ALCo and D&H)	each built with a different valve gear; 651 Dabeg, 652 Walschaerts, 653 poppet valve
712-737	2-8-0	E-2	1899		
738-764	2-8-0	E-2a	1900-1901		
765-785	2-8-0	E-2b	1901-1902		
786-803	2-8-0	E-3	1902		*E-3 and E-3a original numbers (as of 1906) before extensive 1920s rebuilding program
804-889	2-8-0	E-3a	1903-1906		*E-3 and E-3a original numbers (as of 1906) before extensive 1920s rebuilding program
786, 788, 795, 885	2-8-0	E-3a	1902		*second listing of E-3 class engines by final number (separated by sub-class)
789, 797, 800, 831, 846, 849, 854, 857, 864, 865, 868, 873, 876, 879, 880, 895, 898, 900	2-8-0	E-40	1902- 1906	ALCo	*second listing of E-3 class engines by final number (separated by sub-class)
894, 987, 901	2-8-0	E-42	1902- 1906	ALCo	*second listing of E-3 class engines by final number (separated by sub-class)
802	2-8-0	E-45	1902	ALCo	*second listing of E-3 class engines by final number (separated by sub-class)
801, 803-829	2-8-0	E-48	1902-1906	ALCo	*second listing of E-3 class engines by final number (separated by sub-class)
905-923, 925-930, 932-957	2-8-0	E-51	1902-1906	ALCo	*second listing of E-3 class engines by final number (separated by sub-class)
999	2-8-0	E-3a	1911	ALCo	convertible between oil- or coal-burning
1000-1006	2-8-0	E-4	1899-1901	Schenectady (pre-ALCo)	rebuilt into class B-5
1007-1096	2-8-0	E-5	1906-1914	ALCo	
1111-1122	2-8-0	E-5a	1926-1930	D&H and ALCo	
1200-1220	2-8-0	E-6a	1916-1918	ALCo	1219 received the world's first fusion-welded boiler in 1937
1400 (Horatio Allen), 1401 (John B. Jarvis), 1402 (James Archbald)	2-8-0	E-7	1924, 1927, 1930	ALCo	experimental; used marine-type boilers with water-tube fireboxes
1403 (L. F. Loree)	4-8-0		1933	ALCo	experimental; four-cylinder triple expansion engine
1600-1612	0-8-8-0	H	1910-1912	ALCo	
1500-1501	2-6-6-0	H-1	1910	ALCo	converted to 0-6-6-0 shortly after purchase
300-314	4-8-4	K	1943	ALCo	built as K-62, later reclassified K-63; called "Laurentians" by D&H
1500-1539	4-6-6-4	J	1940-1946	ALCo	

== Company officers ==
- Philip Hone: 1825-1826
- John Bolton: 1826-1831
- John Wurts: 1831-1854
- George Talbot Olyphant: 1858-1869
- Thomas Dickson: 1869-1884
- Robert M. Olyphant: 1884-1903
- David Wilcox: 1903-1907
- Leonor F. Loree: 1907-1938
- Thomas L. Hunter: 1938-1941
- Joseph Nuelle: 1941-1954
- William White: 1954-1967
- John P. Hiltz Jr.: 1967
- Frederic C. Dumaine Jr.: 1967-1968
- Frank W. McCabe: 1968
- John P. Fishwick: 1969-1970
- Gregory W. Maxwell: 1970-1972
- Carl B. Sterzing Jr.: 1972-1977
- Selig Altschul: 1977
- Charles E. Bertrand: 1977-1978
- Kent Shoemaker: 1978-1981
- Charles McKenna: 1981-1986
- Timothy Mellon: 1984-1988 (Guilford Transportation Industries ownership)
- Walter Rich: 1988-1991 (Federally Designated Operator: Delaware Otsego Corp/NYS&W)
- Robert J. Ritchie: 1991-2006 (Canadian Pacific Ownership)
- Fred Green: 2006-2012 (CP)
- Stephen C. Tobias: (Interim) 2012 (CP)
- E. Hunter Harrison: 2012–2017 (CP)
- Keith Creel: 2017-Today (CP)

== Heritage units ==
On June 4, 2025, NS EMD SD70ACe #1080 was painted and revealed in the D&H's gray and blue livery at the Altoona Shops in Altoona, PA.

On June 23, 2025, Delaware-Lackawanna ALCo RS-3 #4068 was also painted and revealed in the D&H's gray and blue livery at their Scranton Shops in Scranton, PA.

== See also ==
- Batten Kill Railroad
- SUNY Plaza
- Delson, Québec
- Delaware and Hudson Rail Trail
- Lacolle railway station
- Delaware Canal - A sister canal from the mouth of the Lehigh River and canal terminus, feeding urban Philadelphia connecting with the Morris and Lehigh Canals at their respective Easton terminals.
- Delaware and Raritan Canal – A New Jersey canal connection to the New York & New Jersey markets shipping primarily coal across the Delaware River. The D&R also shipped Iron Ore from New Jersey up the Lehigh.
- Chesapeake and Delaware Canal – A canal crossing the Delmarva Peninsula in the states of Delaware and Maryland, connecting the Chesapeake Bay with the Delaware Bay.
- Delaware and Hudson Canal - Another early built coal canal as the American canal age began; contemporary with the Lehigh and the Schuylkill navigations.
- Lehigh Canal – the coal canal along the Lehigh Valley that fed the United States early Industrial revolution energy needs directly and via the Delaware Canal businesses all along the forty miles to Philadelphia from Easton, Pennsylvania. (Note: If the Lehigh Canal hadn't been built, the Delaware Canal would have had nothing worth the expense to ship, so the investment would never have happened. The principle customer of the Delaware was the coal barges coming down the Lehigh shipped by Lehigh Coal & Navigation Company, which also came to manage the Delaware Canal into the 1960s.)
- Pennsylvania Canal System - ambitious collection of far flung canals, and eventually railroads authorized early in 1826.
- Schuylkill Canal - Navigation joining Reading, PA and Philadelphia. (Note: The Schuylkill Canal was long delayed by investors quarreling over the best way to proceed. Disgusted, White and Hazard explored tapping Anthracite via the Lehigh, and ended up incorporating the Lehigh Coal & Navigation Company which spearheaded many technological initiatives.)
