= List of Vermont railroads =

The state of Vermont owns around 305 miles (491 km) of the 578 miles (930 km) of track within the state. It leases it to Vermont Rail System, Green Mountain Railroad and Washington County Railroad. The state funds capital improvements; Vermont Rail System funds maintenance and runs freight over them.

The following railroads operate in the U.S. state of Vermont.

== Common freight carriers ==
- Canadian National Railway (CN)
- Canadian Pacific Kansas City (CPKC)
- Central Maine and Quebec Railway (CMQ) (Rail Acquisition Holdings)
- Clarendon and Pittsford Railroad (CLP) (Owned by Vermont Railway)
- Green Mountain Railroad (GMRC) (Owned by Vermont Railway)
- New England Central Railroad (NECR) (Genesee and Wyoming)
- New Hampshire Central Railroad (NHCR)
- Pan Am Railways (PAR)
- Pan Am Southern Railroad (PAS) (Operated by Pan Am Railways)
- St. Lawrence and Atlantic Railroad (SLR) (Genesee and Wyoming)
- Vermont Railway (VTR)
- Washington County Railroad (WACR) (Owned by Vermont Railway)

== Passenger carriers ==
- Amtrak (AMTK)
- Green Mountain Railroad (GMRC)

== List of railroads ==
Name	Mark	System (Note: This is one or more of the Class I railroads that the railroad became part of, if any.)	From	To	Successor
Addison Railroad		RUT	1867	1951	Rutland Railway
Ashuelot Railroad		B&M	1844	1890	Connecticut River Railroad
Atlantic and St. Lawrence Railroad		CN	1848	1960	Canadian National Railway
Barre Railroad		B&M	1888	1913	Barre and Chelsea Railroad
Barre Branch Railroad		B&M	1888	1913	Montpelier and Wells River Railroad
Barre and Chelsea Railroad	B&C, BC	B&M	1913	1957	Montpelier and Barre Railroad
Bennington and Rutland Railroad		RUT	1865	1870	Harlem Extension Railroad
Bennington and Rutland Railway		RUT	1877	1901	Rutland Railroad
Bethel Granite Railway		CN	1904	1937	N/A
Boston, Concord and Montreal Railroad		B&M	1844	1890	Concord and Montreal Railroad
Boston, Hoosac Tunnel and Western Railway		B&M	1878	1892	Fitchburg Railroad
Boston and Lowell Railroad		B&M	1884	1887	Boston and Maine Railroad
Boston and Maine Corporation	BM	B&M	1963	(Note: Still exists as a lessor of Pan Am Railways operating subsidiary Springfield Terminal Railway)	N/A
Boston and Maine Railroad	B&M, BM	B&M	1887	1964	Boston and Maine Corporation
Brandon and West Rutland Railroad			1901	1911	Clarendon and Pittsford Railroad
Brattleboro and Fitchburg Railroad		CN	1843	1851	Vermont and Massachusetts Railroad
Brattleboro and Whitehall Railroad		CN	1876	1905	West River Railroad
Bristol Railroad			1882	1930	N/A
Burlington and Lamoille Railroad		CN	1875	1889	Burlington and Lamoille Valley Railroad
Burlington and Lamoille Valley Railroad		CN	1889	1899	Central Vermont Railway
Canada Atlantic Railway		CN	1897	1905	Grand Trunk Railway
Canadian American Railroad	CDAC		1996	2003	Montreal, Maine and Atlantic Railway, Washington County Railroad
Canadian Pacific Railway	CP	CP	1884	1996	Northern Vermont Railroad
Central Maine and Quebec Railway	CMQ		2014	2020	Canadian Pacific Railway
Central Vermont Railroad		CN	1872	1899	Central Vermont Railway
Central Vermont Railway	CV	CN	1899	1995	New England Central Railroad
Champlain and Connecticut River Railroad		RUT	1843	1847	Rutland and Burlington Railroad
Chatham and Lebanon Valley Railroad		RUT	1899	1901	Rutland Railroad
Cheshire Railroad		B&M	1844	1890	Fitchburg Railroad
Concord and Montreal Railroad		B&M	1890	1919	Boston and Maine Railroad
Connecticut and Passumpsic Rivers Railroad		B&M, CP	1835	1946	Boston and Maine Railroad, Newport and Richford Railroad
Connecticut River Railroad		B&M	1845	1919	Boston and Maine Railroad
Consolidated Railroad of Vermont		CN	1882	1891	Central Vermont Railroad
Coos Valley Railroad		MEC	1882	1982	Maine Central Railroad
Deerfield River Company			1883	1891	Hoosac Tunnel and Wilmington Railroad
Deerfield River Railroad			1906	1924	N/A
Deerfield Valley Railroad			1890	1891	Hoosac Tunnel and Wilmington Railroad
Delaware and Hudson Company		D&H	1899	1930	Delaware and Hudson Railroad
Delaware and Hudson Railroad	D&H	D&H	1928	1968	Delaware and Hudson Railway
Delaware and Hudson Railway	DH	D&H	1968	1983	Clarendon and Pittsford Railroad
Delaware and Hudson Canal Company		D&H	1871	1899	Delaware and Hudson Company
East Barre and Chelsea Railroad		B&M	1892	1913	Barre and Chelsea Railroad
Essex County Railroad		B&M	1864	1880	St. Johnsbury and Lake Champlain Railroad
Fitchburg Railroad		B&M	1887	1919	Boston and Maine Railroad
Grand Trunk Railway	GT	CN	1853	1923	Canadian National Railway
Hardwick and Woodbury Railroad		B&M	1894	1934	N/A
Harlem Extension Railroad		RUT	1870	1873	New York, Boston and Montreal Railway
Hoosac Tunnel and Wilmington Railroad	HTW		1888	1971	N/A
Lamoille County Railroad			1973	1974	St. Johnsbury and Lamoille County Railroad
Lamoille Valley Railroad	LVRC		1977	2004	N/A
Lamoille Valley Railroad		B&M	1867	1880	St. Johnsbury and Lake Champlain Railroad
Lamoille Valley Extension Railroad		CN	1872	1887	Central Vermont Railroad
Lebanon Springs Railroad		RUT	1893	1900	Rutland Railroad
Lebanon Springs Railroad		RUT	1852	1870	Harlem Extension Railroad
Maine Central Railroad	MEC	MEC	1888	2003	New Hampshire Central Railroad
Manchester, Dorset and Granville Railroad			1902	1918	N/A
Midland Railroad		CP	1902	1936	N/A
Missisquoi Railroad		CN	1867	1887	Missisquoi Valley Railroad
Missisquoi and Clyde Rivers Railroad		CP	1869	1880	Newport and Richford Railroad
Missisquoi Valley Railroad		CN	1886	1899	Central Vermont Railway
Montpelier and Barre Railroad	MB		1956	1980	Washington County Railroad
Montpelier and St. Johnsbury Railroad		B&M	1866	1880	St. Johnsbury and Lake Champlain Railroad
Montpelier and Wells River Railroad	M&WR	B&M	1867	1945	Barre and Chelsea Railroad
Montpelier and White River Railroad		CN	1867	1891	Central Vermont Railroad
Montreal and Atlantic Railway		CP	1894		Canadian Pacific Railway
Montreal, Maine and Atlantic Railway	MMA		2002	2014	Central Maine and Quebec Railway
Montreal, Portland and Boston Railway		CP			N/A
New Hampshire and Vermont Railroad	NHVT		1993	2000	N/A
New London Northern Railroad		CN	1880	1951	Central Vermont Railway
New York, Boston and Montreal Railway		RUT	1873	1876	Bennington and Rutland Railway, New York, Rutland and Montreal Railroad
New York, Rutland and Montreal Railroad		RUT	1883	1893	Lebanon Springs Railroad
Newport and Richford Railroad		CP	1880	2003	Montreal, Maine and Atlantic Railway, Washington County Railroad
North Stratford Railroad	NSRC		1977	1989	N/A
Northern Railroad		B&M	1844		
Northern Vermont Railroad	NVR		1996	2003	Montreal, Maine and Atlantic Railway, Washington County Railroad
Pittsford and Rutland Railroad			1890	1911	Clarendon and Pittsford Railroad
Portland and Ogdensburg Railroad		MEC	1869	1887	Portland and Ogdensburg Railway
Portland and Ogdensburg Railway		MEC	1886	1943	Maine Central Railroad
Rensselaer and Saratoga Railroad		D&H	1865	1871	Delaware and Hudson Canal Company
Rutland Railroad	RUT	RUT	1867	1950	Rutland Railway
Rutland Railway	RUT	RUT	1950	1961	Green Mountain Railroad, Vermont Railway
Rutland and Burlington Railroad		RUT	1847	1867	Rutland Railroad
Rutland–Canadian Railroad		RUT	1898	1901	Rutland Railroad
Rutland and Washington Railroad		D&H	1847	1865	Salem and Rutland Railroad
Rutland and Whitehall Railroad		D&H	1848		
St. Johnsbury and Lake Champlain Railroad	SJ&L	B&M	1880	1955	Maine Central Railroad
St. Johnsbury and Lamoille County Railroad	SJL		1974	1976	Vermont Northern Railroad
St. Johnsbury and Lamoille County Railroad	SJL		1949	1973	Lamoille County Railroad
St. Lawrence and Atlantic Railroad		CN	1852	1853	Grand Trunk Railway
Salem and Rutland Railroad		D&H	1867	1868	Rensselaer and Saratoga Railroad
Saratoga and Washington Railroad		D&H	1850	1855	Saratoga and Whitehall Railroad
Saratoga and Whitehall Railroad		D&H	1855	1865	Rensselaer and Saratoga Railroad
South Eastern Railway		CP	1878	1894	Montreal and Atlantic Railway
Southern Vermont Railroad		B&M	1848	1891	Fitchburg Railroad
Sullivan County Railroad	SC	B&M		1949	Boston and Maine Railroad
Troy and Boston Railroad		B&M	1856	1887	Fitchburg Railroad
Twin State Railroad	TSRD		1984	1999	New Hampshire Central Railroad
Upper Coos Railroad		MEC	1888	1982	Maine Central Railroad
Vermont and Canada Railroad		CN	1845	1891	Central Vermont Railroad
Vermont Central Railroad		CN	1843	1884	Consolidated Railroad of Vermont
Vermont and Massachusetts Railroad		CN	1851	1880	New London Northern Railroad
Vermont and New York Railroad		RUT	1865	1867	Lebanon Springs Railroad
Vermont Northern Railroad	VNOR		1976	1977	Lamoille Valley Railroad
Vermont and Province Line Railroad		CN	1897	1960	Canadian National Railway
Vermont Valley Railroad	VV	B&M	1848	1949	Boston and Maine Railroad
West River Railroad		CN	1905	1936	N/A
West River Railroad		CN	1867	1876	Brattleboro and Whitehall Railroad
Western Vermont Railroad		RUT	1845	1865	Bennington and Rutland Railroad
White River Railroad			1902	1934	N/A
White River Valley Railroad			1900	1902	White River Railroad
White River Valley Railroad			1896	1898	White River Valley Electric Railroad
White River Valley Electric Railroad			1898	1900	White River Valley Railroad
Woodstock Railroad			1863	1890	Woodstock Railway
Woodstock Railway	WSK		1890	1933	N/A

Private carriers

- Lye Brook Railroad
- Missisquoi Pulp and Paper Company
- Moose River Lumber Company
- Moose River Railroad
- New England Power Company
- New Hampshire Stave and Heading Mill

Electric

- Barre and Montpelier Traction and Power Company
- Bellows Falls and Saxton's River Street Railway
- Bennington and Hoosick Valley Railway
- Bennington and North Adams Street Railway
- Bennington and Woodford Electric Railroad
- Berkshire Street Railway
- Brattleboro Street Railroad
- Burlington and Hinesburgh Railway
- Burlington Traction Company
- Military Post Street Railway
- Mount Mansfield Electric Railroad
- Rutland Railway, Light and Power Company
- Rutland Street Railway
- St. Albans Street Railway
- St. Albans and Swanton Traction Company
- St. Johnsbury Street Railroad
- Springfield Electric Railway
- Springfield Terminal Railway (ST)
- Twin State Gas and Electric Company
- Vermont Company
- Winooski and Burlington Horse Railroad

Not completed

- Portland, Rutland, Oswego and Chicago Railroad
- Rutland and Woodstock Railroad
- Southern Vermont Railway

== Bibliography ==
- Association of American Railroads (2003), Railroad Service in Vermont (PDF). Retrieved May 11, 2005.
- Jones, Robert C. (1993). Railroads of Vermont, vols. I and II, Shelburne, Vt.:New England Press.
