= Union Station (Burlington, Vermont) =

Rail station and office building in Burlington, Vermont, United States

Burlington, VT
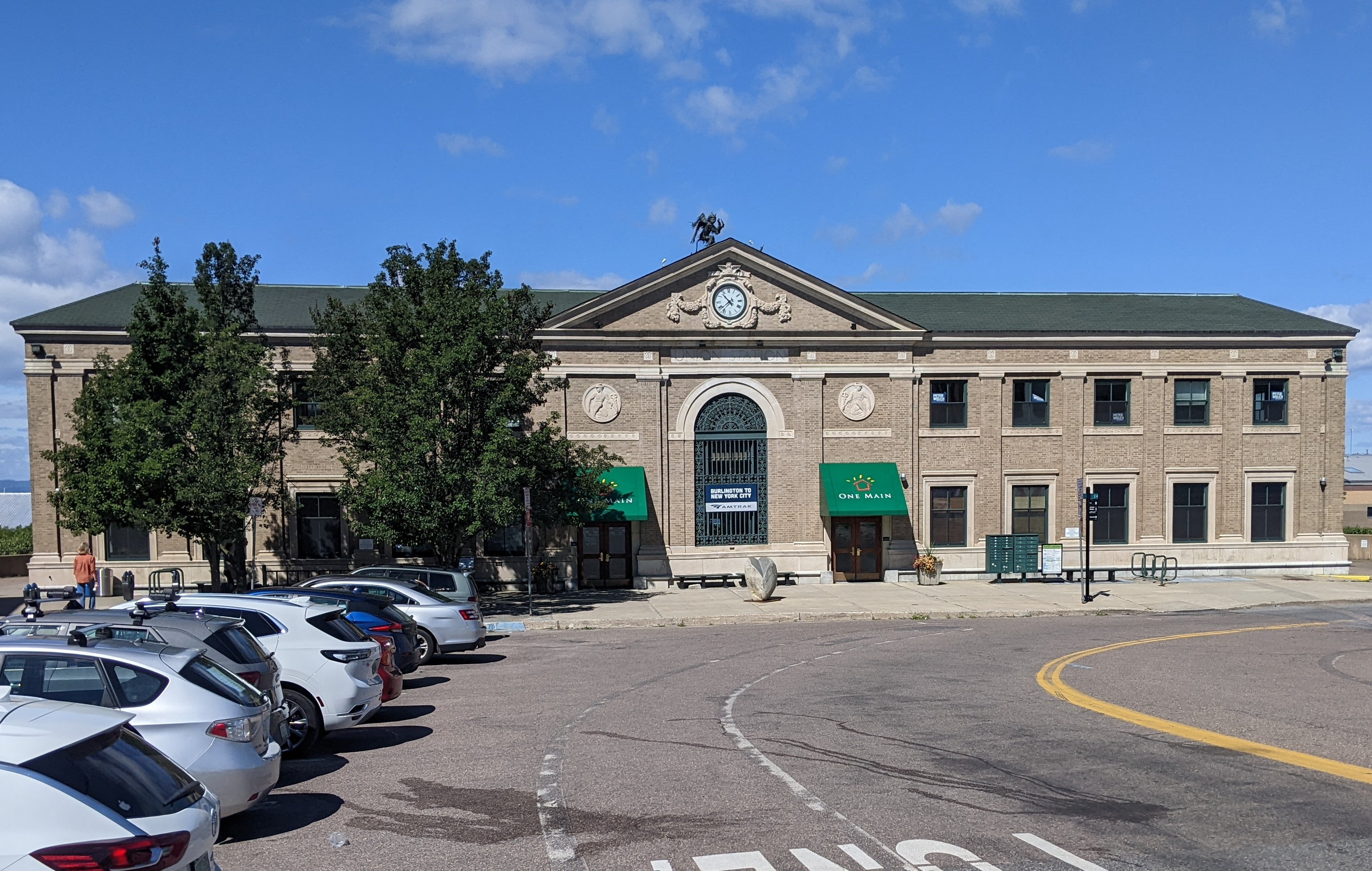
- View of Union Station from Main Street in July 2022

General information
- Location: 1 Main Street; Burlington, Vermont; United States
- Coordinates: 44.4757°N 73.2195°W
- Owner: Main Street Landing Company
- Lines: NECR Burlington Subdivision; VRS Northern Subdivision; Rutland Railroad Island Line (former)
- Platforms: 1 side platform
- Tracks: 1
- Connections: Green Mountain Transit; Burlington - Port Kent Ferry

Construction
- Parking: Yes
- Accessible: Yes

Other information
- Status: Unstaffed station with waiting room
- Station code: Amtrak: BTN

History
- Opened: January 23, 1916; July 29, 2022
- Closed: June 26, 1953

Passengers
- FY 2025: 26,477 (Amtrak)

Services
Preceding station	Amtrak	Following station
Terminus	Ethan Allen Express	Ferrisburgh–Vergennes toward New York
Former services
Preceding station	Vermont Railway	Following station
Terminus	Champlain Flyer 2000–2003	General Dynamics toward Charlotte
Preceding station	Central Vermont Railway	Following station
Terminus	Winooski Subdivision Service ended 1938	Winooski toward Essex Junction
Preceding station	Rutland Railroad	Following station
South Hero toward Rouses Point	Main Line	Shelburne toward North Bennington or Bellows Falls
South Hero toward Montreal	Green Mountain Flyer / Mount Royal	Shelburne toward New York or Boston
- Union Station
- U.S. National Register of Historic Places
- U.S. Historic district – Contributing property
- Part of: Battery Street Historic District
- NRHP reference No.: 77000098
- Designated CP: November 2, 1977
Location

Burlington Union Station is a train station and office building located in downtown Burlington, Vermont, United States. It is the northern terminal of the Amtrak Ethan Allen Express service. A single side platform on the west side of the station serves Vermont Railway excursion trains and Amtrak trains. The symmetrical Beaux Arts building, built of buff brick with limestone and granite trim, has a central pilaster over two entrances. The main building is divided for use by a variety of tenants.

Rail service to Burlington began in December 1849 with the completion of the Rutland and Burlington Railroad (which later became the Rutland Railroad) and the Vermont Central Railroad (VC). The VC replaced its original station by 1853; it constructed a new line into Burlington in 1861, with a temporary station on the waterfront. It built a permanent station with an arched trainshed in 1866–67. This became a union station in 1871 when the VC leased the Rutland. After local advocacy for a new station, an expansion was built in 1895–96. The Rutland became independent again in 1898 and soon constructed an extension northwards from Burlington.

Planning for a new union station began in 1909, but the railroads and the city struggled to reach an agreement about whether to eliminate grade crossings. After years of discussion and a legal battle about one design, a design with at-grade tracks was approved in 1914. Construction began that November, and the new Union Station opened on January 23, 1916. Passenger service began to decline shortly afterwards; the CV replaced most shuttle trains to Burlington with buses in 1932, and ended its rail service to the station in 1938. Rutland service to Burlington, including the Green Mountain Flyer, lasted until 1953. The building was sold to Green Mountain Power in 1955 and renovated for use as offices.

After the Rutland attempted to abandon its system, most lines were taken over by Vermont Railway in 1964. It soon began operating excursion trains from Burlington. Union Station was added to the National Register of Historic Places in 1977 as a contributing property to the Battery Street Historic District. It was purchased by a private developer in 1985. After a failed attempt that year, a waterfront development was built in the 1990s, with Union Station renovated and an addition built. It served as the terminal of Champlain Flyer commuter service from 2000 to 2003. Construction of a new platform for Amtrak service took place from 2020 to 2022, and Ethan Allen Express service began on July 29, 2022.

== Station design ==
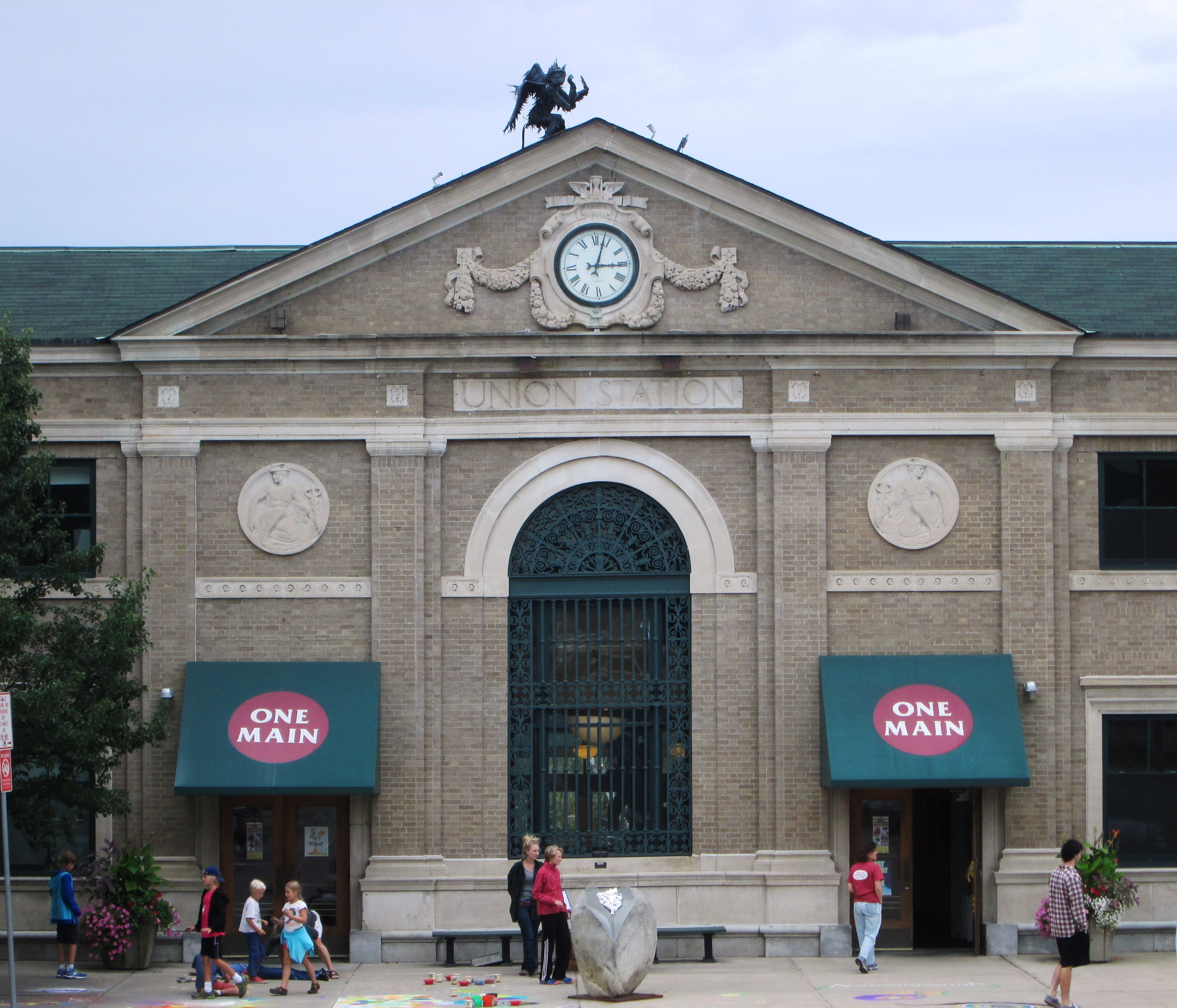
Detail of the station's center section

Union Station is located at the west end of Main Street in downtown Burlington near the Lake Champlain waterfront. It is built into a hillside, with two stories aboveground plus a basement level accessed from the west side. It is 5 by 13 bays – approximately 55 ft × 138 ft (17 m × 42 m) – oriented north-south, with the bays defined by pilasters. The symmetrical Beaux Arts building is built of buff brick with limestone and granite trim. It has a hip roof with a central flat section; on the Main Street side, a pediment with tops the three central bays. The central bay has ornamental grillwork and a large clock; the flanking bays have carvings of Mercury and the entrance doors.

When the station was originally opened, those doors led directly into the 30 ft × 75 ft (9.1 m × 22.9 m) main waiting room, which was finished with white oak and Vermont marble. The ticket office was between the doors. The baggage office and women's waiting room were at the north side of the station, with the main baggage room below. At the south end was the station restaurant, with the express office and mail room below. Two island platforms serving four passenger tracks were located on the west side of the station, with freight bypass tracks to their west. An enclosed footbridge ran west from the waiting room, with stairs down to the covered platforms.

The Union Station building is owned by Main Street Landing Company. It has been substantially renovated since its use as a station; the main floors are subdivided for use by tenants including art studios and other businesses, nonprofit organizations, and the Vermont Agency of Transportation. The original platforms and footbridge are no longer extant; a semicircular addition is located on the rear of the basement level, with a plaza on its roof. The modern Amtrak platform is a single side platform serving the single track, with the Island Line Trail on the west side of the track. The station is the junction of the New England Central Railroad Burlington Subdivision (Winooski Branch) and the Vermont Railway Northern Subdivision. The dock for the Burlington - Port Kent Ferry is on King Street about 600 ft (180 m) southwest of Union Station, while several Green Mountain Transit bus routes stop on nearby streets.

Four steel statues of winged monkeys sit on the roof of Union Station. Two were originally commissioned in 1976 for a local waterbed store, named "Emerald City" after the capital city of the fictional Land of Oz. They were purchased by Main Street Landing to add "whimsy and fun" to the building and were installed in June 1997. Two "babies" were added in 2004.

== History ==
=== Early stations ===
The Rutland and Burlington Railroad (R&B) opened between Burlington and Bellows Falls on December 18, 1849, with regular service beginning December 24. Its Burlington terminal was along the waterfront at the intersection of Water Street (now Battery Street) and South Street (Maple Street). The competing Vermont Central Railroad (VC) was completed between Burlington and White River Junction on December 25, 1849. The first VC station in Burlington, at St. Paul Street and Maple Street, was converted from an unfinished house.

A track continued through downtown from the VC station to reach the waterfront industries and the Lake Champlain ferries. By 1853, a new VC passenger station was located between College Street and Main Street at Water Street (now Winsooki Avenue) – now the site of Fletcher Free Library. The R&B tracks were extended north along the waterfront in 1850 to connect with the VC. By 1851, connecting railroads allowed Boston and New York City connections from Burlington via both the VC and R&B.

The two railroads quickly developed a bitter rivalry. The Vermont and Canada Railroad (V&C) was chartered in 1845 to connect with both railroads in Burlington and continue north to Canada. The VC leased the V&C in 1849; the V&C was terminated (in violation of its charter) at a connection with the VC at Essex Junction in 1851. To spite the Rutland, the VC and V&C made connections at Burlington and Essex Junction deliberately poor. In May 1861, the VC opened a new route from Winooski to Burlington via the Burlington Tunnel. A temporary depot was placed near College Street on the waterfront, and the old line into Burlington was abandoned. The original station remained extant until at least 1981.

=== 1867 station ===
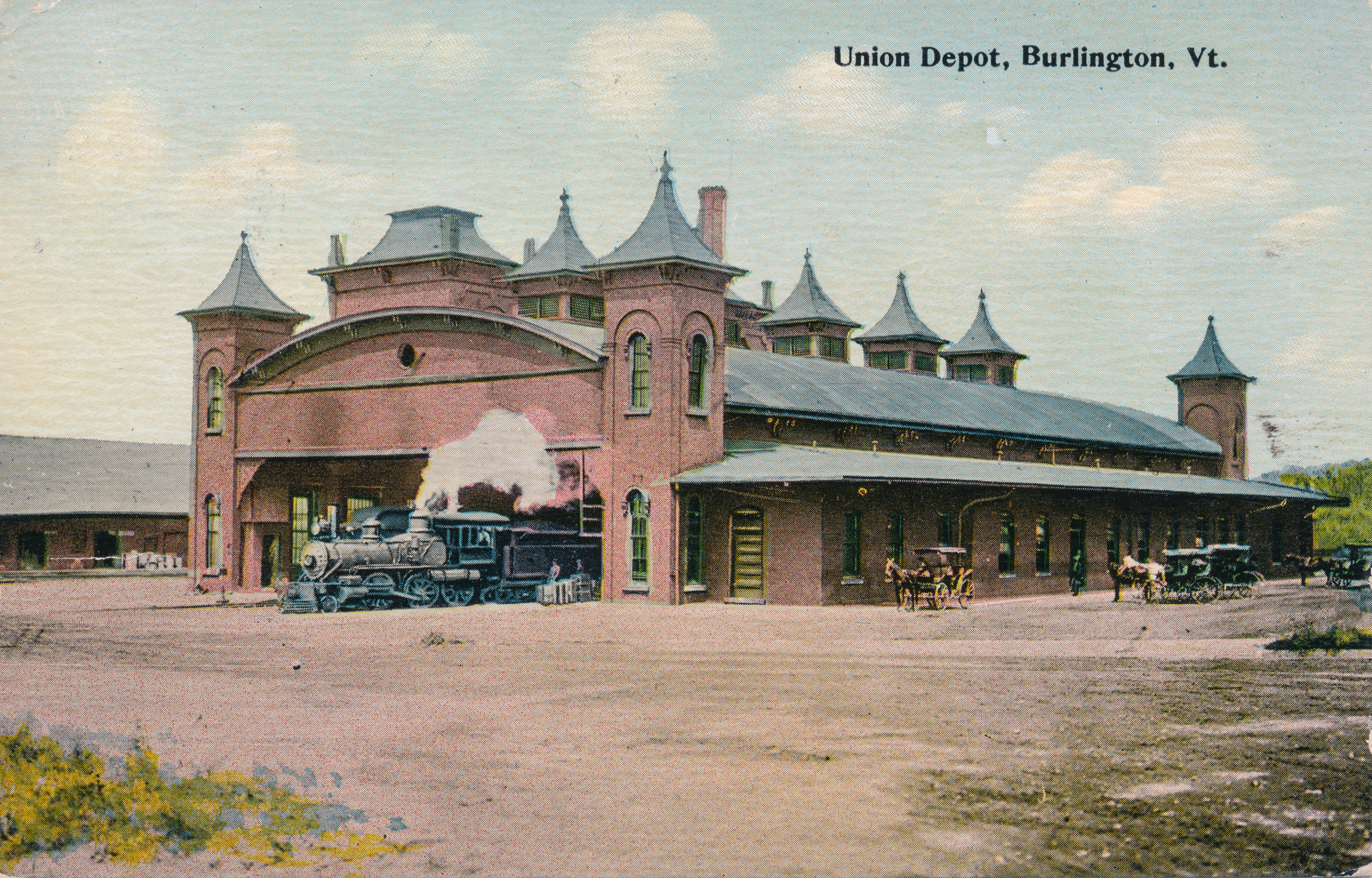
The 1867-built station around 1910

Work on a permanent station for the VC, located north of College Street near Lake Street, began in early 1866. The new station was made of brick with a granite foundation. The main structure was 204 ft (62 m) long north–south and 88 ft (27 m) wide, with an arched train shed covering three tracks. The walls were 27 ft (8.2 m) high, with 11 ft (3.4 m)-square towers for storage and ornamentation at each corner. A 102 ft (31 m)-long wing on the west side, with a center section 40 ft (12 m) high flanked by two 64 ft (20 m)-high towers, housed the waiting rooms and railroad offices. The station was completed in late 1866 or early 1867. The cost was estimated at $50,000 (equivalent to $920,000 in 2024).

The R&B became the Rutland Railroad in 1867. In December 1870, the VC reached an agreement to lease the Rutland. This took effect on January 8, 1871. On January 13, the Rutland depot was closed, and all Rutland trains began using the VC station. The acquisition of the Rutland and other properties pushed the VC into bankruptcy in 1873; it emerged as the Central Vermont Railroad (CV). By 1875, the former Rutland station was reused as a machine shop.

The Burlington and Lamoille Railroad opened between Burlington and Cambridge Junction via Essex Junction on July 2, 1877. Passenger trains used the CV station in Burlington, while the old Rutland station was leased for use as the railroad's offices and maintenance shops. Passenger trains were rerouted over the CV between Burlington and Essex Junction on June 1, 1880; the corresponding section of the Burlington and Lamoille was quickly abandoned. The CV took control of the Burlington and Lamoille in 1889; it continued to use the former Rutland station as maintenance shops for several years. The building was demolished in August 1897.

In mid-1889, the Burlington Board of Trade began advocating for the construction of a new union depot. The city council passed a resolution supporting the effort in November 1889. In January 1890, the CV presented potential plans to either built a new station or improve the existing one. The original twenty-year lease of the Rutland expired in 1890; after initially making an agreement with the Delaware and Hudson Railroad (D&H), the Rutland signed a renewed lease with the CV. Not until February 1895 did the CV announce plans for a major renovation of the station, with new waiting rooms on the east side of the station and a covered platform for the east track. The work also included replacement of the original brick arches of the trainshed with modern supports, and construction of a spur track for the Burlington Traction Company that allowed streetcars to load from the south portion of the new platform. Construction began on July 3, 1895; the new waiting rooms opened in December, with the platform canopies completed in early 1896.

For a second time, leasing the Rutland bankrupted the CV, and it entered receivership on March 20, 1896. The Rutland was separated on May 7 and entered control of the D&H (which owned the majority of its stock), though it continued to use the CV station in Burlington. A group including William Kissam Vanderbilt, William Seward Webb, and Rutland president Percival W. Clement purchased control of the Rutland Railroad from the D&H effective October 22, 1898, and the railroad became fully independent. The Rutland immediately moved to build the long-planned Rutland–Canadian Railroad (Island Line) between Burlington and Rouses Point, New York, with a branch to Noyan, Quebec. Regular passenger service on the new line began on January 7, 1901. The south portion of the canopy at Burlington station was removed between 1900 and 1906.

=== Union Station planning ===
The 1867-built station, which had been built by the CV primarily for Essex Junction–Burlington shuttle trains, proved inadequate for the increased traffic of the Rutland and its 1901 extension plus the Burlington and Lamoille. Planning for a new union station began in 1909. In February 1911, the state legislature authorized the state public service commission to select a site and order the railroads to build a new union station. Hearings before the commission began in July 1911. The two railroads disagreed about numerous facets of the project; the CV wanted to elevate the tracks to eliminate several grade crossings, which the Rutland opposed. The commission chairman remarked in August that the results of the proceedings up to that point were "about on par with a man dragging a cat by the tail across a carpet."

The CV presented a revised plan for the station and grade crossing eliminations in September 1911. The CV estimated the cost at $315,000 (equivalent to $7.69 million in 2024)., while the Rutland estimated $250,000 (equivalent to $6.1 million in 2024). An alternate CV plan with no grade crossing eliminations was presented that December. In February 1912, local engineer Frank O. Sinclair presented a new proposal, created at the request of a city committee. It called for the station building to be on the west side of the tracks at Main Street – rather than the east side as in the CV plans – and for a road overpass to be built.

In August 1912, the public service commission chose a newer CV design that had been presented that January. Main Street would be terminated at the station, while College, King, and Maple streets pass under the new elevated tracks. That December, the commission issued a formal order for the railroads to construct the new union station by December 15, 1913. Total cost was estimated at $385,000 (equivalent to $9.03 million in 2024); the city would pay $15,000 (equivalent to $350,000 in 2024), with the remainder split between the railroads. Later that month, the Rutland petitioned the Vermont Supreme Court to vacate the commission's order, claiming that the railroad would lose valuable land from the construction of the station and elevated tracks, and that the commission had exceeded its constitutional authority. A hearing before the court was held in February 1913.

In April 1913, the two railroads agreed to work with the city to create a plan acceptable to all parties. An agreement for at-grade tracks was reached that July; estimated cost was $165,000 (equivalent to $3.87 million in 2024). The building was designed by New York architect Alfred T. Fellheimer, with Charles Schultz as supervising architect. Fellheimer's plans were accepted in February 1914. The location at the foot of Main Street would be kept, with part of Lake Street rerouted to connect with Main Street. The tracks would remain at grade, with the grade crossings not eliminated; a footbridge would provide access from the station building to the platforms. The city board of aldermen approved the plan that March. In April, the Vermont Supreme Court modified the 1912 public service commission order, allowing the new plan to go forward.

=== Construction and service ===
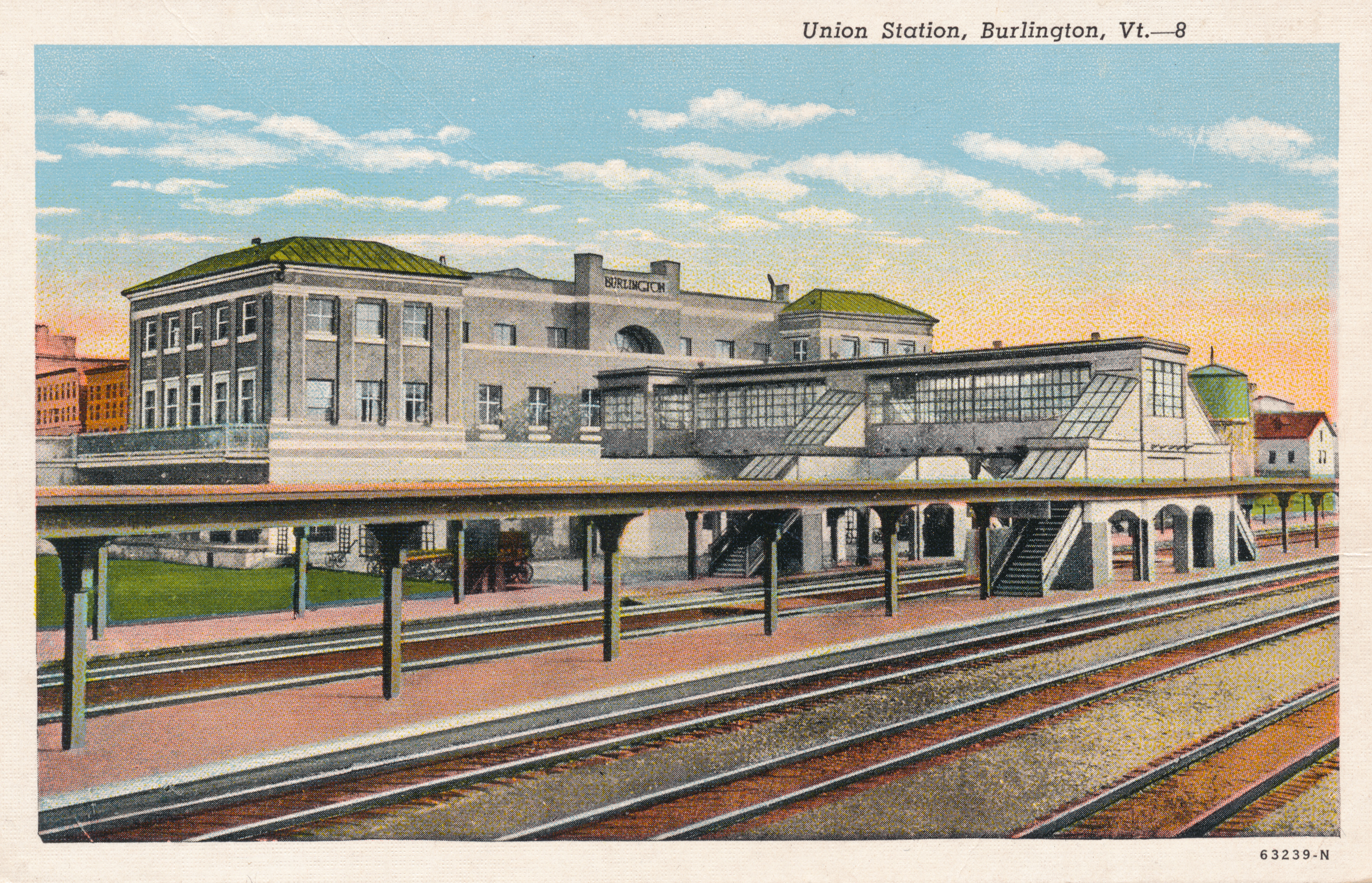
Union Station, c. 1920

Bids for station construction were opened in June 1914. The city formally discontinued sections of Main Street and Lake Street in July, making way for construction. After delays during negotiations, some related to rising steel prices due to the outbreak of war in Europe, the contract was awarded to W.S. Swallow & Company in October 1914. Construction of the foundation began on November 3, 1914; while initial plans were for work to begin in spring 1915, the earlier start was intended to reduce costs and avoid spring flooding. On February 17, 1915, the state legislature passed a bill allowing 16 ft (4.9 m) of clearance – rather than the standard 22 ft (6.7 m) – on the passenger tracks at the station. This allowed the station footbridge to be level with the station floor, and reduced the number of steps passengers would have to climb from the platforms.

Work resumed after the winter in late March 1915. The new tracks were in place by April 1915, with the basement walls completed in May. July 1915 saw the second floor laid and the steel framing of the footbridge built; the roof was built in August. The platforms were poured in September 1915; the station was half complete by the end of the month. October through December 1915 saw work on the stucco and marble interior finishes, completion of plumbing and wiring, and other interior and exterior items. Burlington Union Station opened on January 23, 1916. The former station was demolished in January through March 1917; the bricks were reused to build a chocolate factory.

The railroads conducted a major renovation of the station in 1929, focusing on the footbridge and platforms. Burlington's position off the New London–Montreal CV mainline – despite several proposals to reroute the mainline through Burlington – meant its CV service was primarily shuttle trains from Essex Junction. On February 1, 1932, the CV dropped most passenger service between Burlington and Essex Junction. Burlington Rapid Transit ran bus service between Burlington and Essex Junction to meet all trains, while Pullman passengers were provided with limousine service between the homes and Essex Junction. Only two daily round trips continued to operate on the line: a Burlington–Boston through sleeping car on the New Englander, and the Burlington–Cambridge Junction mixed train on the B&L.

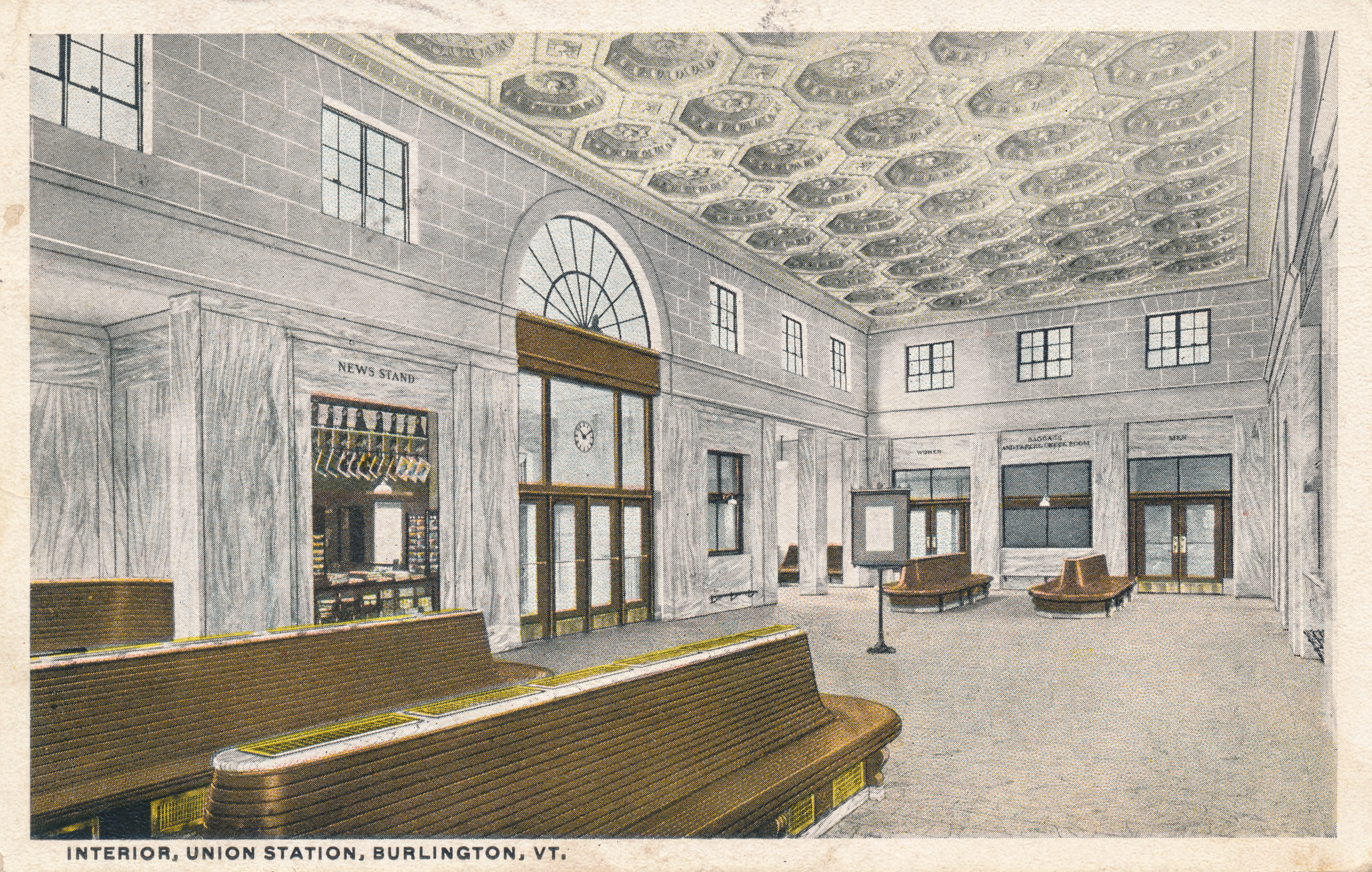
The interior of the station, c. 1920

The Boston–Burlington sleeper was dropped by 1936. The Burlington–Cambridge Junction mixed train was cut on June 17, 1938, ending CV passenger service to Burlington. In the 1940s, Green Mountain Power rented a portion of the station as offices. Passenger service on the Rutland declined as well. By 1953, only three daily round trips served Burlington: the New York/Boston–Montreal Mount Royal, the New York/Boston–Burlington Green Mountain Flyer (cut back from Montreal in 1951), and a Rutland–Alburgh local (which also served as the northbound Boston section of the Green Mountain Flyer). A strike on June 26, 1953, ended Rutland Railway passenger service – and passenger service to Burlington.

=== Reuse and modern service ===
In March 1955, Green Mountain Power purchased Union Station. The building was substantially renovated; the ceiling of the waiting room was lowered to provide a larger second floor. Part of the platform area was enclosed for use as a garage and storage space. The CV and Rutland continued to operate freight service to Burlington. After a second strike in 1961, the Rutland attempted to abandon its entire system. Most of the system, including the Burlington–Rutland mainline, was taken over by the Vermont Railway in early 1964. The railway began operating excursion services out of Burlington soon after taking over the line, and has continued to operate them since under its Green Mountain Railroad subsidiary.

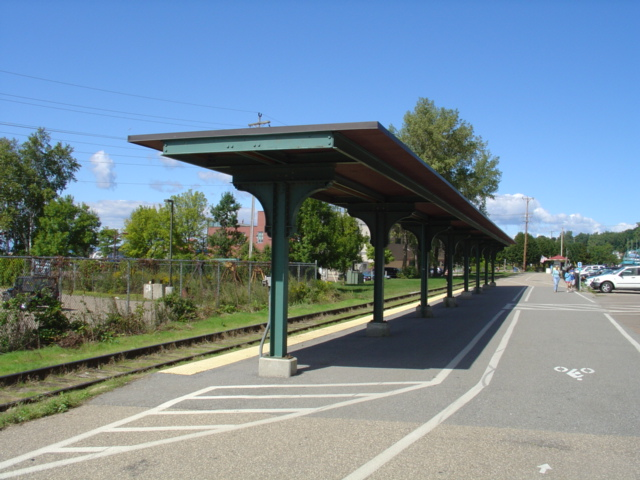
The Champlain Flyer platform in 2006, prior to the 2020s construction of the Amtrak platform

Most of the Island Line was abandoned with end of the Rutland Railway. The Vermont Railway operated a 1.8-mile (2.9 km) section in Burlington until 1975. Beginning in 1971, the portion in Burlington was turned into a rail trail, which eventually became part of the Island Line Trail. CV passenger service to Essex Junction station, about 5.5 miles (8.9 km) east, lasted until 1966; Amtrak resumed service there in 1972 with the Montrealer. Union Station was added to the National Register of Historic Places in 1977 as a contributing property to the Battery Street Historic District. The New England Central Railroad took over the CV in 1995; that year, the Montrealer was truncated as the Vermonter.

The Alden Waterfront Company (later renamed Main Street Landing) purchased Union Station in 1985 as part of plans for a large waterfront development. A city bond for the development was rejected by city voters that December. Part of the building was converted to serve as a homeless service center; other portions were rented out as studios, political campaign offices, and other uses.

In 1992, Main Street Landing proposed a new version of its waterfront development plans, including renovation of Union Station for use as shops and office space. A $1.5 million addition on the rear of the station building was constructed in 1997–98; the old footbridge was removed. Located at the basement level with a street-level plaza on its roof, the expansion was intended to serve as a train station for planned commuter rail service. From August 16 to October 31, 1999, the Vermont Railway operated the Ethan Allen Connection between Burlington and Rutland, where connection could be made to the Amtrak Ethan Allen Express. A new platform behind Union Station was constructed in 2000 for the Champlain Flyer commuter rail service, which began operation between Burlington and Charlotte on December 4, 2000. Never successful at attracting riders, the service only ran until February 28, 2003.

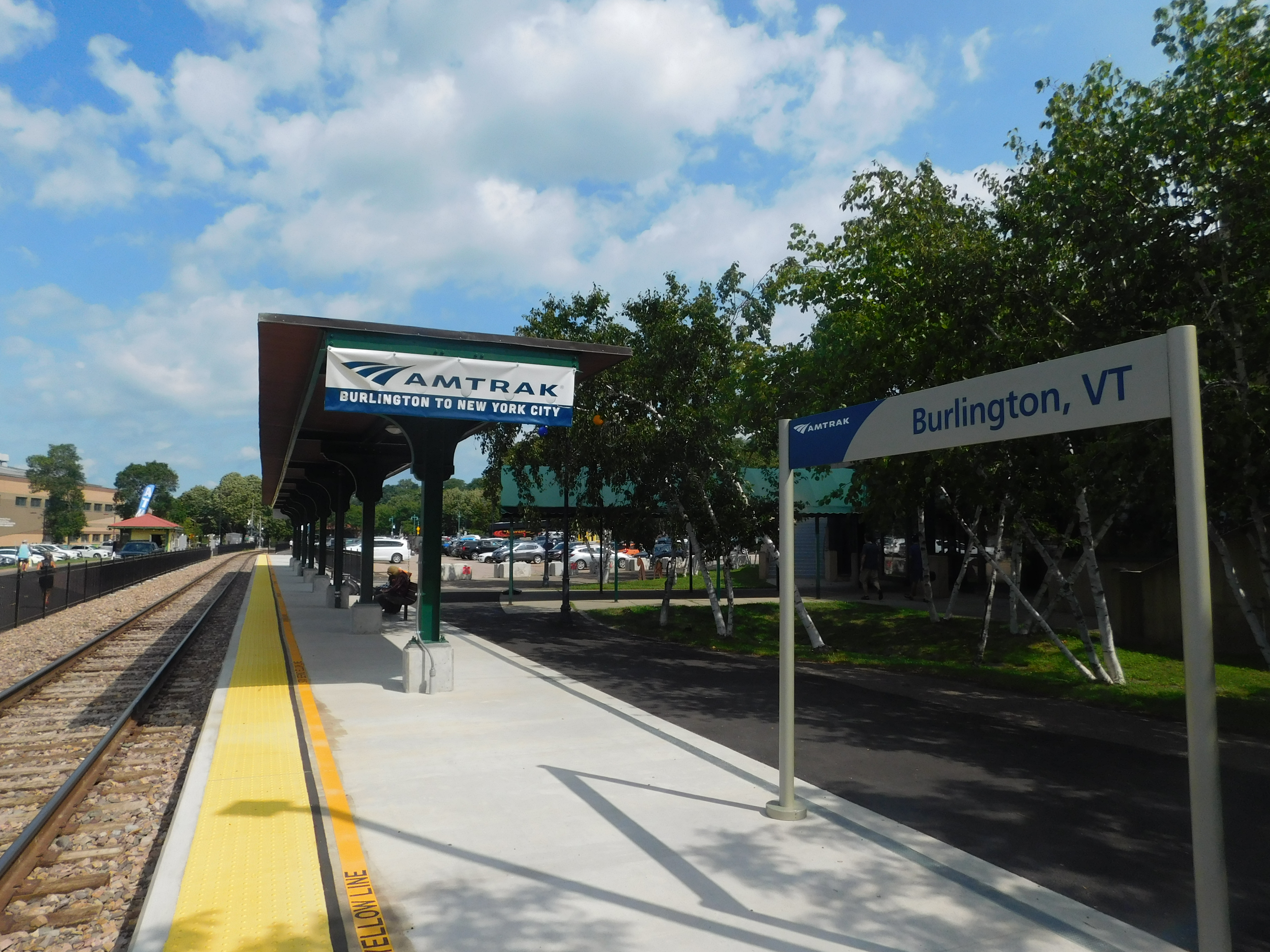
The new Amtrak platform in August 2022

Even before the Ethan Allen Express began service to Rutland in 1996, state planners intended to extend the train to Burlington. Three state applications for American Recovery and Reinvestment Act of 2009 funds were unsuccessful, but $19 million in Transportation Investment Generating Economic Recovery monies awarded in 2013 and 2015 funded the $26 million project. In June 2019, the Chittenden County Regional Planning Commission recommended Union Station as the location where Amtrak trains would lay over and be serviced overnight. A siding track and three-phase power connection were to be constructed at the station. After nearby residents objected to having the locomotive idle there, VTrans indicated in March 2020 that the Vermont Railway yard to the south would instead be modified to accommodate the train.

Construction work at Union Station in preparation for the extension took place in late 2020 to early 2022. Work included construction of a longer platform for Amtrak trains, realignment of the single track, and relocation of the Island Line Trail to the west side of the track. Ethan Allen Express service to Burlington began on July 29, 2022. Potential future Ethan Allen Express service expansions include a second daily trip to Burlington (using a different route between Albany and Rutland) and an extension to Essex Junction to provide a connection with the Vermonter (after the planned re-extension of the latter to Montreal). The station is also served by excursion trains operated by the Vermont Rail System.
