= Champlain Flyer =

Commuter train service in Vermont, US

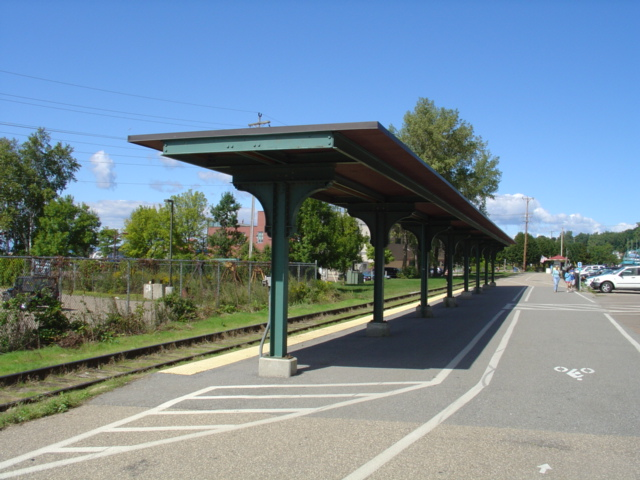
- Champlain Flyer platform at Burlington

Overview
- Service type: Commuter rail
- Status: Discontinued
- Locale: Chittenden County, Vermont
- First service: December 4, 2000
- Last service: February 28, 2003
- Successor: Champlain Valley Flyer
- Former operator: Vermont Railway

Route
- Termini: Burlington; Charlotte
- Stops: 2
- Distance travelled: 13 miles (21 km)
- Service frequency: 7.5 round trips per day

Technical
- Track gauge: 4 ft 8 1/2 in (1,435 mm)
- Track owner: Vermont Railway

The Champlain Flyer was a commuter train service in Vermont that ran from 2000 to 2003 between Burlington, South Burlington, Shelburne, and Charlotte, in the eastern Champlain Valley. The Vermont Railway operated the 13-mile (21 km) route along the former main line of the Rutland Railroad.

== History ==
The Champlain Flyer was conceived as an alternate transportation option during the reconstruction of U.S. Route 7. It benefited from public funds earmarked for public transportation.

The train began operation on December 4, 2000, with two daily round-trips, with plans to operate as many as ten. Startup costs were $18 million ($33.7 million in 2025 adjusted for inflation), most of which were provided by the federal government for improving the tracks and grade crossings along the route. At the time of its inception, it was the shortest commuter rail system in the United States.

Initial ridership figures were lower than expected as the highway reconstruction project was delayed. In 2002, it was threatened to be cut from the state budget. The newly elected Gov. Jim Douglas (who succeeded Gov. Howard Dean of Shelburne) decided that the train was not viable, and the last train ran on February 28, 2003, despite all contracts being pre-paid through the end of the year.

=== Later service ===
The Vermont Railway has periodically operated an excursion train service from Burlington to Charlotte and back known as the Champlain Valley Flyer.

Regular passenger service returned to Burlington Union Station in July 2022, when Amtrak extended the Ethan Allen Express north from Rutland. The train uses the former route of the Champlain Flyer, but does not serve any of its former stations except Burlington. The Vermont Agency of Transportation has raised the possibility of adding an infill stop in Shelburne, where the Champlain Flyer platform still exists.

== Operations ==
The service's rolling stock consisted of a rebuilt Vermont Railway GP38-2 and ten ex-Virginia Railway Express de-motored RDC cars. Two of these cars were outfitted with cab control. Fares were $1 for a one-way trip, collected on the honor system by being deposited in a box upon entering the train.
