= Midland Railroad =

Midland Railroad may refer to the following railroads:

- Florida Midland Railroad (current)
- Florida Midland Railroad (defunct)
- Midland Railroad (Massachusetts)
- Midland Railroad (Vermont), a Vermont railroad
- New Jersey Midland Railway

== See also ==
- Midland Railway (disambiguation)
- Midland Line (disambiguation)
