= MML =

MML can stand for:

== Academia ==
- Master of Modern Languages, an undergraduate degree offered by the University of Manchester, which includes the study of two modern languages to Master's level
- Medieval and Modern Languages, an undergraduate degree offered by the Faculty of Medieval and Modern Languages, University of Oxford (FMML)
- Modern and Medieval Languages, an undergraduate degree offered by (and the corresponding faculty at) the University of Cambridge

== Computer programming ==
- Medical Markup Language, an application of Extensible Markup Language (XML)
- MML (language), man-machine language, a computer language
- Modeling Maturity Level, a scale to indicate to which degree an architecture uses models (used in software development)
- Music Macro Language, a music notation format used in producing music for personal computers and video game systems
- Music Markup Language, an application of Extensible Markup Language (XML)
- An abbreviation for the voice over IP application Mumble, primarily designed for use by Scottermac (mml)

== Forums, organizations, or companies ==
- Maskew Miller Longman, a South African publishing company owned by Maskew Miller Learning.
- Michigan Municipal League, a non-profit organization representing Michigan cities, villages and urban townships
- MML Capital Partners an international investment company
- Material Measurement Laboratory, a NIST laboratory since 2010
- Milli Muslim League, now the Pakistan Markazi Muslim League (PMML), an Islamist political party in Pakistan, front for the militant group Lashkar-e-Taiba

== Mathematics ==
- 2050 in Roman numerals
- Minimum Message Length, a form of unbiased statistical modeling based on information theory
- MyMathLab, an online education platform, developed by Pearson Education, for teaching and learning mathematics

== Transportation ==
- The IATA airport code for Southwest Minnesota Regional Airport
- The Midland Main Line, a main line railway in the United Kingdom
- Midland Mainline (train operating company), a former train operating company that operated the Midland Main Line franchise.
- Midland Line (disambiguation), for other uses

== Others ==
- Myeloid/lymphoid or mixed-lineage leukemia
- Multi-Mission Launcher, an American missile launcher
- Middlesbrough Music Live, a music festival in Middlesbrough, England
- Metropolitan Municipality of Lima (Municipalidad Metropolitana de Lima), the government institution in charge of the metropolitan area of Lima, Peru
- "MML", level from PlayStation 3 video game Haze
- Mega Man Legends, a videogame series part of the Mega Man franchise.
