= Battery Street Historic District =

Historic district in Vermont, United States

- U.S. National Register of Historic Places
- U.S. Historic district
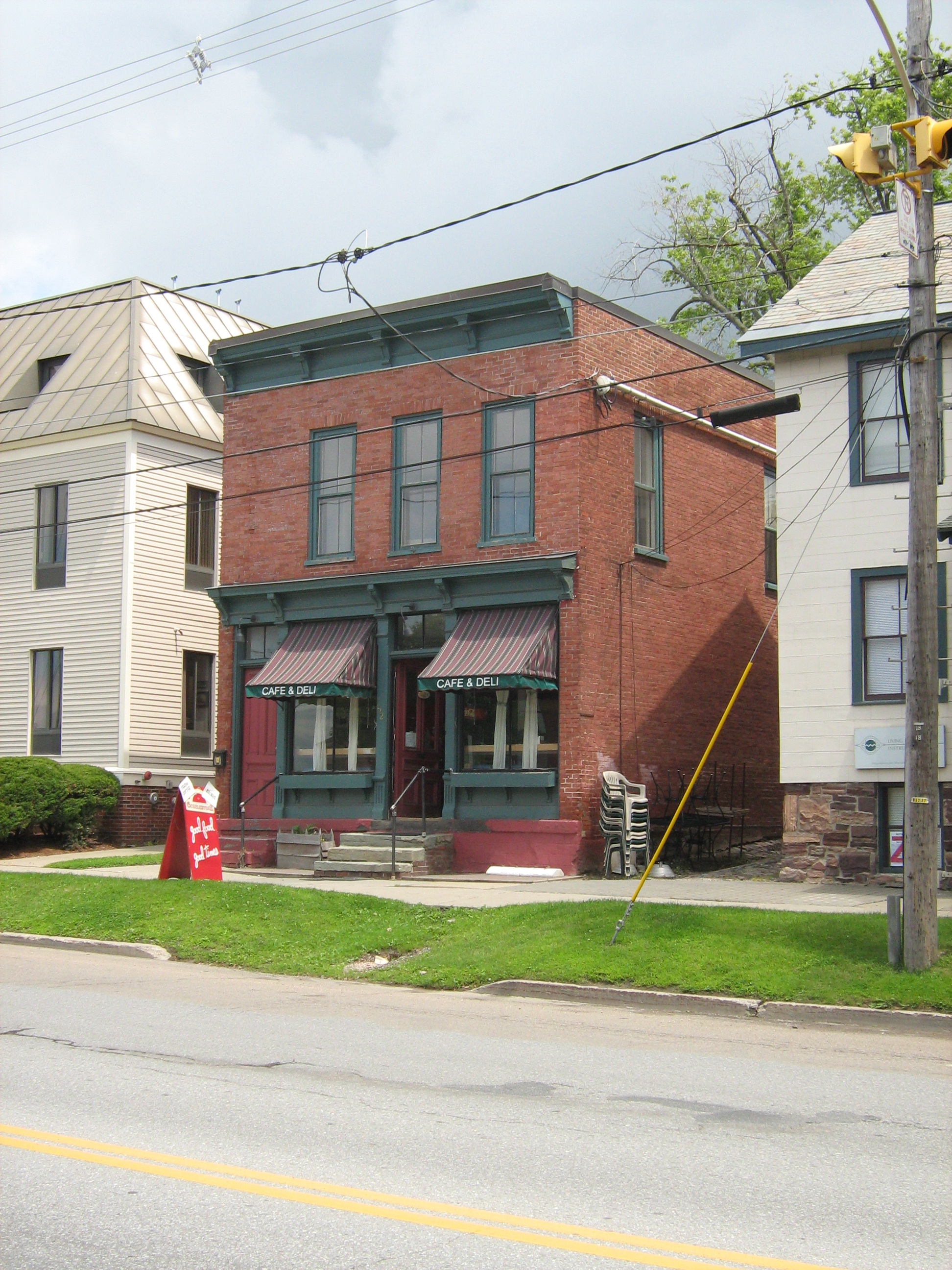

- Location within Vermont Location within the United States
- Location: Roughly bounded by Lake Champlain, Main, Maple, and St. Pauls Sts. (both sides), Burlington, Vermont
- Coordinates: 44°28′29″N 73°13′5″W
- Area: 35 acres (14 ha) (original)
- Built: 1790
- Architectural style: Greek Revival, Federal, Late Victorian
- NRHP reference No.: 77000098 (original); 84003459 (increase 1); 14000451 (increase 2)

Significant dates
- Added to NRHP: November 2, 1977
- Boundary increases: June 28, 1984; July 24, 2014

The Battery Street Historic District encompasses one of the oldest developed areas of Burlington, Vermont. With a history dating to 1790, this area, south of downtown Burlington and initially bounded roughly by Main, St. Paul, and Maple Streets, and Lake Champlain, this area includes a mix of residential, commercial, and industrial uses, with architecture spanning from its early period to the 20th century, including one of the city's oldest houses. The district was listed on the National Register of Historic Places in 1977, and has twice been enlarged, extending west to South Union Street.

== Description and history ==
The city of Burlington, Vermont's largest, was chartered in 1765 and saw early settlement in the 1770s. Significant development was delayed by the American Revolutionary War. The area south of what is now its downtown area became an early center of commerce, and it was at the home Gideon King (still standing on King Street) where the city's proprietors platted out its street grid. The wharves on Lake Champlain were controlled by King and that area has remained a nexus of commerce and transport through the transition from water-based transport to rail-based, and then also truck-based, transport. The area east of King's wharf and south of Main Street developed as a transport support area, with warehouses for the storage of goods awaiting shipment, and was augmented by light industry, including the manufacture of items, such as paper tubes and boxes. The waterfront was also the site of Burlington's only shipyard. Areas further inland were also developed residentially, but today reflect a mix of uses.

When first listed on the National Register in 1977, the district extended east from Lake Champlain to St. Paul Street, and south from Main Street (generally excluding Main Street addresses) to Maple Street. It was substantially enlarged in 1984 to include a mainly residential area of four square blocks roughly bounded by King, South Union, Adams, and St. Paul Streets. A further increase in 2014 added addresses on Pine Street south of Maple Street.

== See also ==
- Union Station (Burlington, Vermont)
- National Register of Historic Places listings in Chittenden County, Vermont
