= Midland Railway (disambiguation) =

The Midland Railway was a British railway company between 1844 and 1922.

Midland Railway may also refer to:

== Argentina ==
- Buenos Aires Midland Railway

== Australia ==
- Midland Railway of Western Australia, two legal entities with the same name

== Canada ==
- Midland Railway of Canada, in Ontario
- Midland Railway (Canada), in Nova Scotia

== New Zealand ==
- Midland Line, New Zealand, built by the New Zealand Midland Railway Company

== United Kingdom ==
- Midland Railway – Butterley, a preserved railway on one of the Midland Railway's lines
- West Midland Railway, a British railway company between 1860 and 1863
- Midland Main Line

== United States ==
- Midland Railway (Kansas), a heritage railroad in Baldwin City, Kansas
- Midland Railway (Georgia), which operated in the US from 1915 to 1924
- Central Midland Railway
- Colorado Midland Railway
- Maryland Midland Railway
- New Jersey Midland Railway
- Gainesville Midland Railway, a Georgia railroad

== See also ==
- Midland Railroad (disambiguation)
- Midland Line (disambiguation)
