= Green Mountain Railroad =

Class III US railway

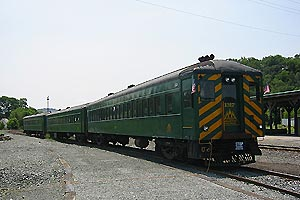
- GMRC cab cars, July 2006

Overview
- Headquarters: Burlington, Vermont
- Reporting mark: GMRC
- Locale: Vermont, New Hampshire, and New York
- Dates of operation: 1964–present

Technical
- Track gauge: 4 ft 8 1/2 in (1,435 mm) standard gauge
- Length: 53 mi (85 km)

Other
- Website: www.rails-vt.com

The Green Mountain Railroad (reporting mark GMRC) is a Class III railroad operating in the U.S. state of Vermont. The railroad operates over former Rutland Railroad and Boston and Maine Railroad lines between North Walpole, New Hampshire, and Rutland, Vermont. Since 1997, it has been a component of the Vermont Rail System. Its corporate colors are green and yellow.

The railroad was founded in 1964 by railroad preservationist F. Nelson Blount, founder of Steamtown, U.S.A. During the 1960s and 1970s, Green Mountain Railroad operated freight service while also providing access to trackage used by Steamtown excursion trains between Bellows Falls and Chester, Vermont. Following Steamtown's relocation to Pennsylvania in 1983, the railroad developed its own excursion operations before concentrating primarily on freight service. In 1997, Green Mountain Railroad became part of the Vermont Rail System.

== History ==
The Green Mountain Railroad (GMRC) was established in 1964 by railroad preservationist and businessman F. Nelson Blount, founder of Steamtown, U.S.A., then located in North Walpole, New Hampshire. Seeking to preserve rail service over portions of the former Rutland Railroad network, Blount persuaded the State of Vermont to acquire approximately 52 miles (84 km) of railroad between Bellows Falls and Rutland, which GMRC would operate under lease.

That same year, incorporation papers were filed for the Steamtown Foundation for the Preservation of Steam and Railroad Americana, a nonprofit organization created to preserve Blount's collection of historic railroad equipment. The foundation's initial objective was to acquire the collection at North Walpole and relocate it to former Rutland Railroad property in Bellows Falls.

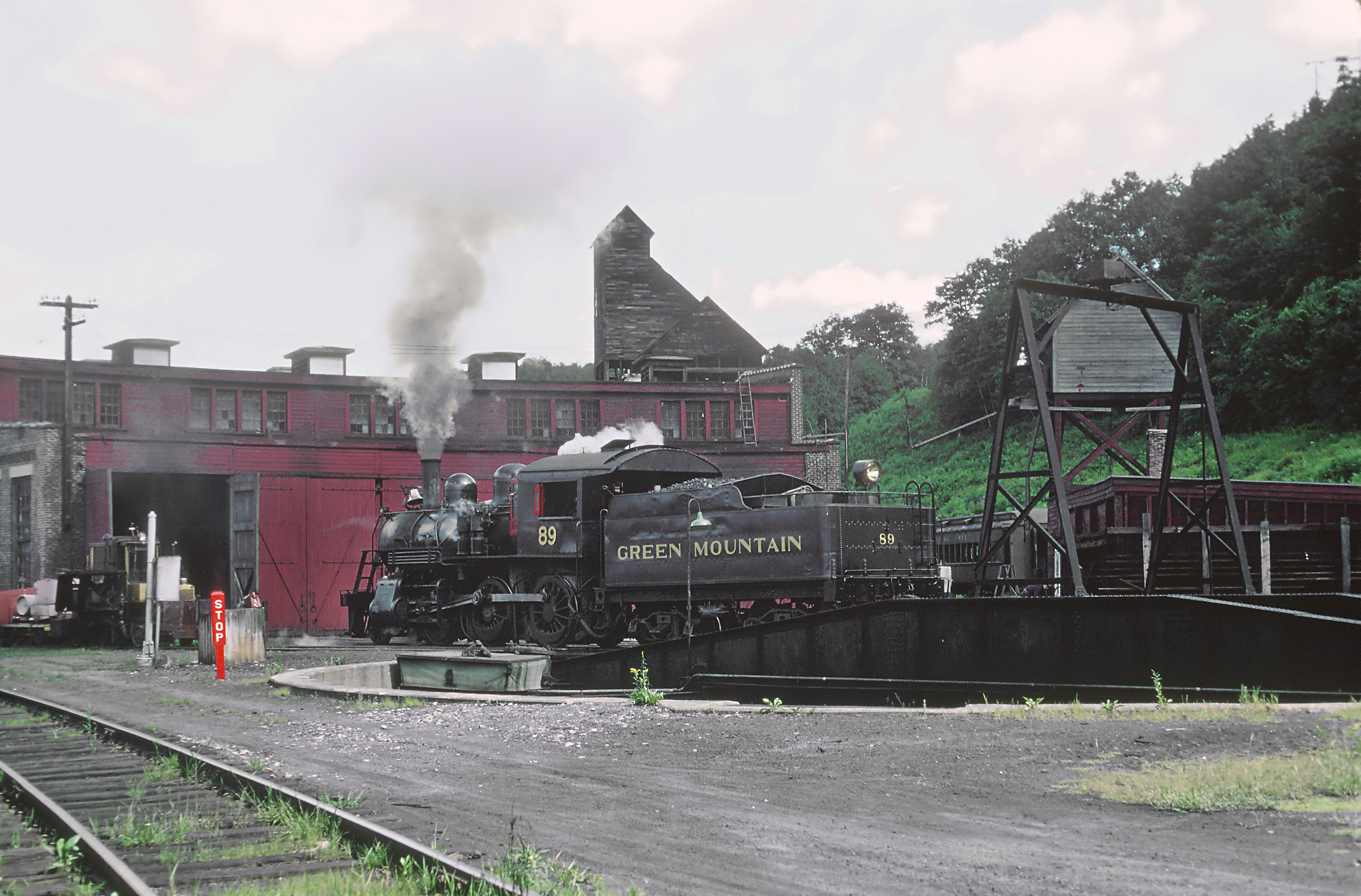
No. 89 on the turntable at Bellows Falls, August 1968

In 1966, GMRC obtained trackage rights over the Boston & Maine Railroad (B&M) between Bellows Falls, Vermont, and North Walpole, New Hampshire. The arrangement provided access to locomotive servicing and storage facilities that had previously been unavailable to the railroad. Blount was killed on August 31, 1967, when his private aircraft struck a tree while attempting an emergency landing near Marlborough, New Hampshire. At the time of his death, he owned 746 of the railroad's 750 outstanding shares.

GMRC ownership was reorganized after Blount's death. In 1968, 49 percent of the company's stock was sold to private investors, while the remaining shares were retained by railroad president Robert Adams, who led the company from 1968 until 1978.

Relations between GMRC and Steamtown became increasingly contentious during the 1970s. Although both organizations depended upon the state-owned railroad between Bellows Falls and Chester, disputes arose over maintenance responsibilities and operating control. The conflict continued until Steamtown relocated its collection to Scranton, Pennsylvania, in 1983. Shortly thereafter, GMRC began operating its own excursion trains over portions of the route using diesel locomotives.

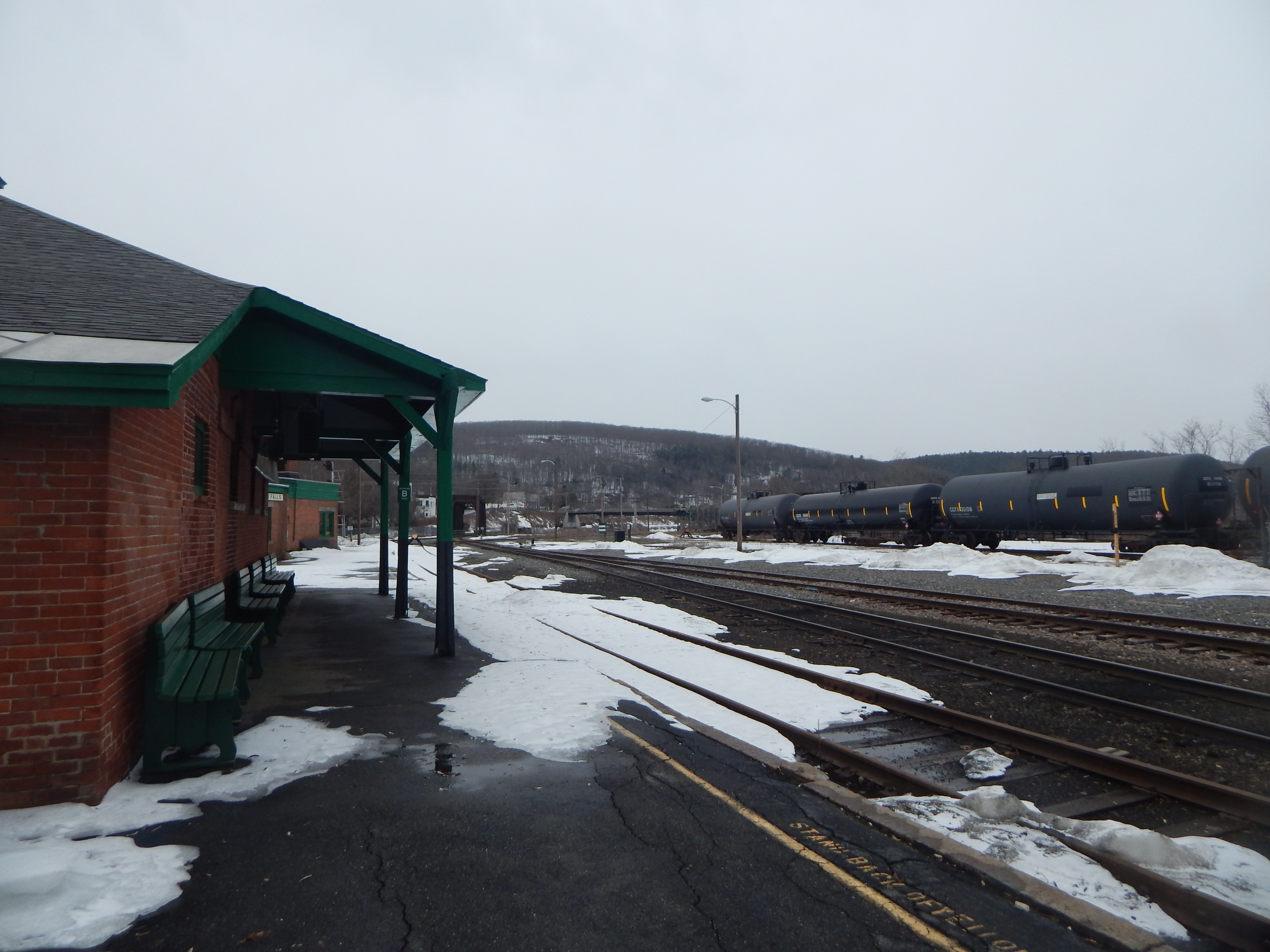
Green Mountain Railroad offices and yard at Bellows Falls in 2015

Throughout the 1980s, GMRC relied heavily on local freight traffic and struggled to maintain consistent profitability. Although the railroad served as a bridge route connecting the Delaware & Hudson Railway (D&H) at Rutland with B&M at North Walpole, interchange traffic remained limited. Annual traffic levels generally remained below 2,000 carloads. The 1986 labor dispute on D&H further reduced overhead traffic and negatively affected the railroad's revenues.

During the early 1990s, increased shipments of commodities such as limestone and fly ash offset declines in traditional traffic, including talc. Freight volumes subsequently expanded, reaching more than 4,000 carloads annually by the middle of the decade and later exceeding 5,000 carloads per year.

The creation of the New England Central Railroad in 1995 improved GMRC's access to markets south of Vermont and provided more competitive interchange opportunities than had existed under the former Central Vermont Railway. In 1997, GMRC was acquired by the Vermont Railway, becoming part of the developing Vermont Rail System. The acquisition formed a key component of a regional railroad network that eventually expanded to include rail operations in Vermont, New Hampshire, and New York.

== Locomotive fleet ==
=== Current fleet ===
Locomotive details
Number	Image	Type	Manufacturer	Built
405		RS1	American Locomotive Company	1951

=== Former fleet ===
Locomotive details
Number	Image	Type	Manufacturer	Built	Owner
89		2-6-0	Canadian Locomotive Company	1910	Strasburg Rail Road
15		2-8-0	Baldwin Locomotive Works	1916	Steamtown National Historic Site
