= Bristol Railroad =

Railway line

Overview
- Headquarters: Bristol
- Locale: Addison County, Vermont
- Dates of operation: 1892–1930

Technical
- Track gauge: 4 ft 8 1/2 in (1,435 mm) standard gauge
- Length: 6 miles (9.7 km)

The Bristol Railroad was a short-line railroad in Addison County, Vermont.

Businessmen in the town of Bristol chartered the railroad in 1890, and the grand opening was on January 5, 1892, although service had actually begun on November 25, 1891, when a car of potatoes was shipped out of Bristol.

The railroad never did much business, and it is unlikely that it ever hauled more than a three-car train. Freight traffic was mostly agricultural. A trip could take as little as 18 minutes, if the locomotive had only one car to handle.

The railroad was abandoned during the Great Depression. The last run was on April 12, 1930. One man, John S. Burt, rode both the grand opening train and the final train. Both the Bristol and New Haven Junction stations survive.

== Locomotives ==
Number	Image	Type	Builder	Notes
1		Forney locomotive	Rhode Island Locomotive Works	65 short tons (59,000 kg). Used until 1930, when the line was abandoned.
		Doodlebug		Formerly worked in Boston. 4-cylinder petrol engine. Used 1911-1922
11		4-4-0		Purchased from Southern Railway. 110 short tons (100,000 kg). Used sporadically 1922-1930. The Forney was better on this railroad. Robert C. Jones Railroads of Vermont, local historical documentation, and Bristol Herald articles of the times.
