= White River Railroad (Vermont) =

Defunct intrastate railroad

The White River Railroad was an intrastate railroad in central Vermont. It ran from Bethel to Rochester, a distance of approximately 19 miles.

== History ==
Planning for the White River Valley Electric Railroad began in 1896, and the line was charted along the course of the White River. The name was changed to White River Valley Railroad and finally White River Railroad before construction began in 1899. Built on a shoestring budget, the first train arrived in Rochester in December 1900. Because the railroad followed the course of the White River closely, it was frequently damaged by floods and was often referred to as "The Peavine". Like most railroads in Vermont, it was heavily damaged by the great Flood of November 1927. Though the railroad was fully rebuilt the following year, the Great Depression reduced traffic to fatal levels, and the railroad was abandoned in 1933.

== Stations ==
The railroad stopped at the following locations from east to west:

- Bethel, Vermont (interchange with the Central Vermont Railway and the Bethel Granite Railway)
- Lillieville, Vermont (informal flagstop)
- Gaysville, Vermont (station)
- Riverside (informal flagstop)
- Stockbridge, Vermont (station)
- Tupper's, Vermont (informal flagstop)
- Emerson, Vermont (informal flagstop)
- Talcville, Vermont (informal flagstop)
- Rochester, Vermont (station)

== Locomotives ==
Locomotive	Description	Year(s)	Number	Name	Built	Build Year	Previous Owner	Notes	Disposition
4-4-0 American	Straight stack. Upper headlight	1901	1		Manchester	1879	B&M		
4-4-0 American	Straight stack. Upper headlight		2						
4-4-0 American	Straight stack. Upper headlight	1910	3		Portland Company	1884	Maine Central		
20 pax doodlebug			4	Hummingbird	4-Wheel Drive Auto Company Clintonville, WI	1911	New		
2-6-0n			5		Baldwin	1913	New	Only new locomotive	Rock of Ages 1933
0-4-4T		1913-1922, 1927	6			1890	Montpelier & Wells River	light passenger service	
2-4-2T		1913	6				Barre Railroad		
2-6-0n		-1927	7					Destroyed during the flood of 1927	
Stanley Steamer		1916-1931	101			1916	New		Sold to Boston & Maine 1931
4-4-0 American	Straight stack. Upper headlight		368				B&M		
4-4-0 American	Straight stack. Upper headlight	1900-1905	CV 45		CV Shops St. Albans	1873	CV	CV 71 W.C. Smith previously	
4-4-0 American	diamond stacked wood burner	1899		John R. Tupper			D&H	First locomotive	
