= Midland Line =

Midland Line may refer to the following rail lines:

- Midland line, Perth, Western Australia, suburban railway line
- Midland railway line, Western Australia, regional railway line
- Midland line (New Zealand)
- Midland line (New Haven), Massachusetts, United States
- Midland Main Line, between London St Pancras station, the East Midlands and Sheffield

== See also ==
- Midland Mainline (train operating company), 1997-2006 company
- Midland Railway (disambiguation)
- Midland Railroad (disambiguation)
