= Burlington Traction Company =

- U.S. National Register of Historic Places
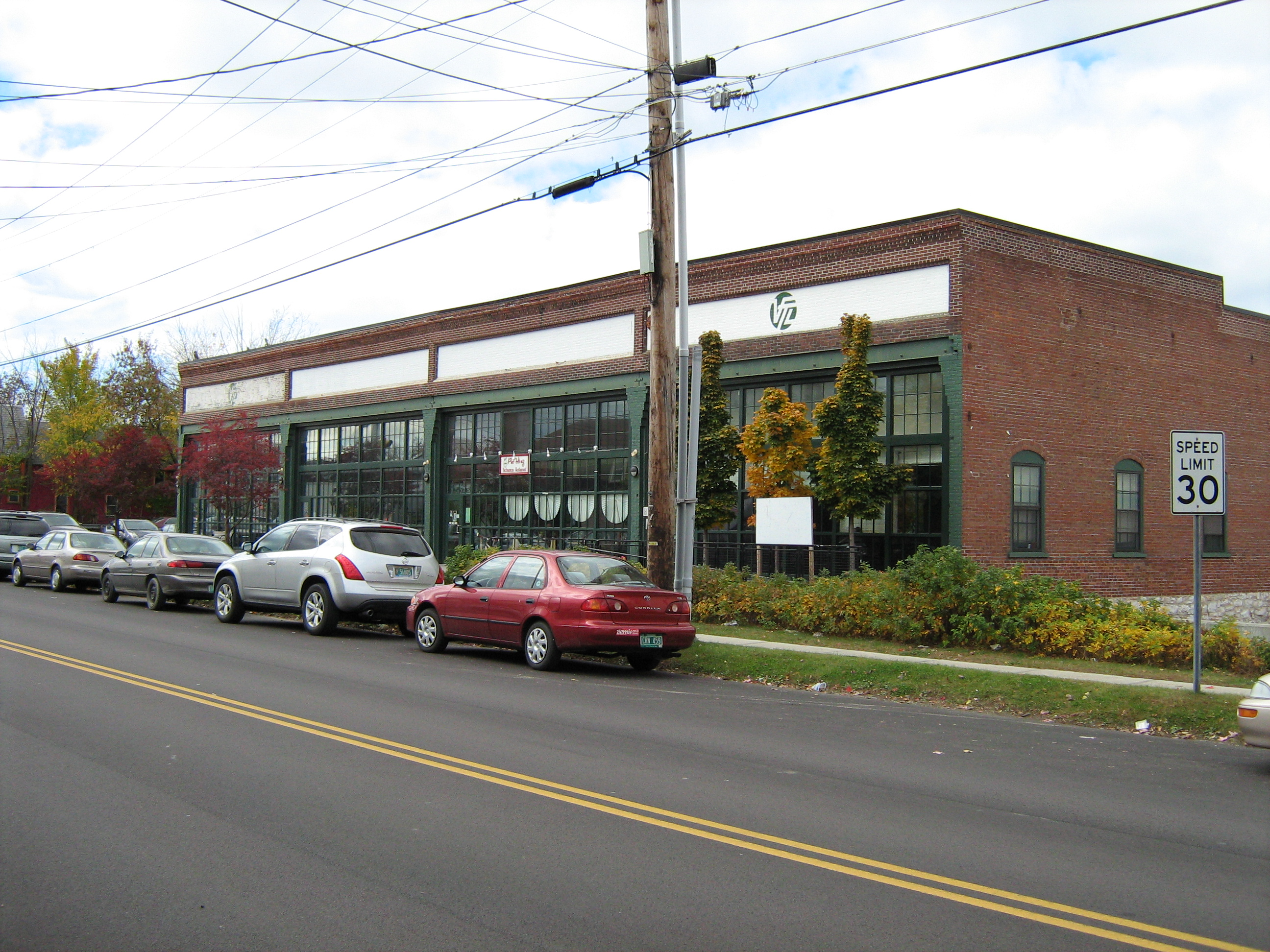

- Location within Vermont Location within the United States
- Location: 662 Riverside Ave., includes 321-343 N. Winooski Ave., Burlington, Vermont
- Coordinates: 44°29′29″N 73°12′22″W
- Area: 1.8 acres (0.73 ha)
- Built: 1900
- Architectural style: Early Commercial, Colonial Revival
- NRHP reference No.: 04001133
- Added to NRHP: October 7, 2004

The Burlington Traction Company is a historic trolley maintenance facility at Riverside Avenue and North Winooski Avenue in Burlington, Vermont. The property includes two brick trolley barns, built c. 1900 and c. 1910 respectively, that were used as public transit maintenance facilities until 1999, after which they were adaptively repurposed to other residential and commercial uses. The property was listed on the National Register of Historic Places in 2004.

== Description and history ==
The former maintenance facility of the Burlington Traction Company is located in Burlington's Old North End neighborhood, on a triangular parcel bounded on the north by Riverside Avenue and the southeast by North Winooski Avenue. The property includes three historic buildings and a modern apartment house, as well as a small public park at the intersection of the two roadways. Abutting Riverside Avenue is a long and narrow single-story gable-roofed brick building, built as a trolley barn about 1910, with an adjoining battery house dating to about 1905. Facing North Winooski Avenue is a larger brick barn, built about 1900. Its main facade consists of four large bays that have finished in small-pane glass and adapted to commercial use. Between this building and the triangular park stands the modern apartment house.

The property was used as a transit maintenance facility since at least 1885 when the Winooski and Burlington Horse Railway Corporation built a maintenance building for its horsecars. Its successors, the Burlington Traction Company and Burlington Rapid Transit, built and expanded the surviving facilities, which were used first for streetcars and then buses until 1999. The last tenant of the maintenance facility was Vermont Transit Lines.

== See also ==
- National Register of Historic Places listings in Chittenden County, Vermont
