= Vermont Railway =

Shortline railroad in Vermont and eastern New York

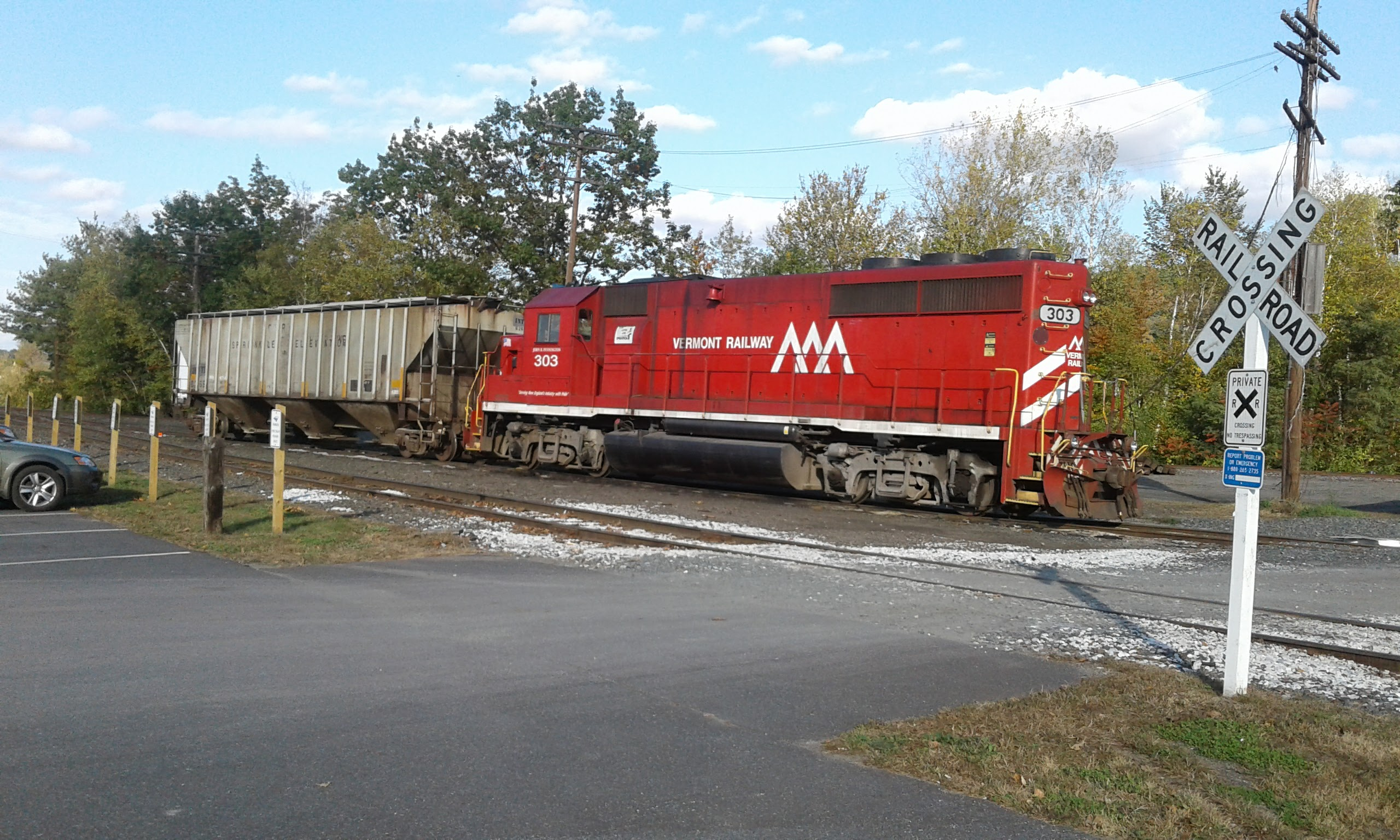
- A Vermont Railway locomotive with a hopper car in White River Junction, Vermont.

Overview
- Headquarters: Burlington, Vermont
- Reporting mark: VTR
- Locale: Vermont, New Hampshire, and New York
- Dates of operation: 1964–present

Technical
- Track gauge: 4 ft 8 1/2 in (1,435 mm) standard gauge
- Length: 400 mi (640 km)

Other
- Website: vrs.us.com

The Vermont Railway (reporting mark VTR) is a shortline railroad in Vermont and eastern New York, operating much of the former Rutland Railway. It is the main part of the Vermont Rail System, which also owns the Green Mountain Railroad, the Rutland's branch to Bellows Falls. The trackage is owned by the Vermont Agency of Transportation except in New York, where VTR operates a line owned by the Boston & Maine Railroad. The rail line employs about 150 people in Vermont.

== History ==
The Rutland Railway was the only north-south line through western Vermont. A strike in 1953 precipitated the company's ending passenger service. Another strike shut down freight operations on September 25, 1961. The government of Vermont purchased the main line south of Burlington, as well as a branch to Bennington, 128.6 miles (207.0 km) total, and the new Vermont Railway, incorporated on October 25, 1963, began operations on January 6, 1964. The company's first president was Jay Wulfson, who came from the Middletown & New Jersey Railroad.

During the early years of the Vermont Railway (VTR), money was spent replacing old locomotives and rolling stock the railroad had inherited from the Rutland. It bought several locomotives, both new and used. It also leased several hundred freight cars.

The railroad continued to expand, entering the intermodal business in 1965, and acquiring the Clarendon & Pittsford Railroad (C&P) in 1972, which gave VTR access to a limestone plant near Florence, Vermont. VTR retained the C&P name as a separate legal entity operating the acquired trackage. In the late 1970s, several senior officials died, including Wulfson. The railroad grossed more than $2 million in revenues for the first time. Net earnings were about $20,000 a year, which was spent in improving the railroad.

In 1982, VTR repaid the state of Vermont for the trackage the state had bought in 1964 to allow VTR to begin operations. A year later, VTR bought 23.7 miles (38.1 km) of track between Rutland and Whitehall, New York from the Delaware & Hudson Railway (D&H) and assigned it to its Clarendon and Pittsford subsidiary. The track was severely deteriorated at the time of purchase, with track speeds as low as 6 miles per hour (9.7 km/h) over the entire line. During the first years after the purchase, a rehabilitation project was begun, upgrading the roadbed as well as the track and ties. Since the line was upgraded to higher standards, Whitehall has become a major interchange point between VTR and D&H (now part of Canadian Pacific Railway). Since 1996, Amtrak's Ethan Allen Express has been operating on the Rutland - Whitehall section.

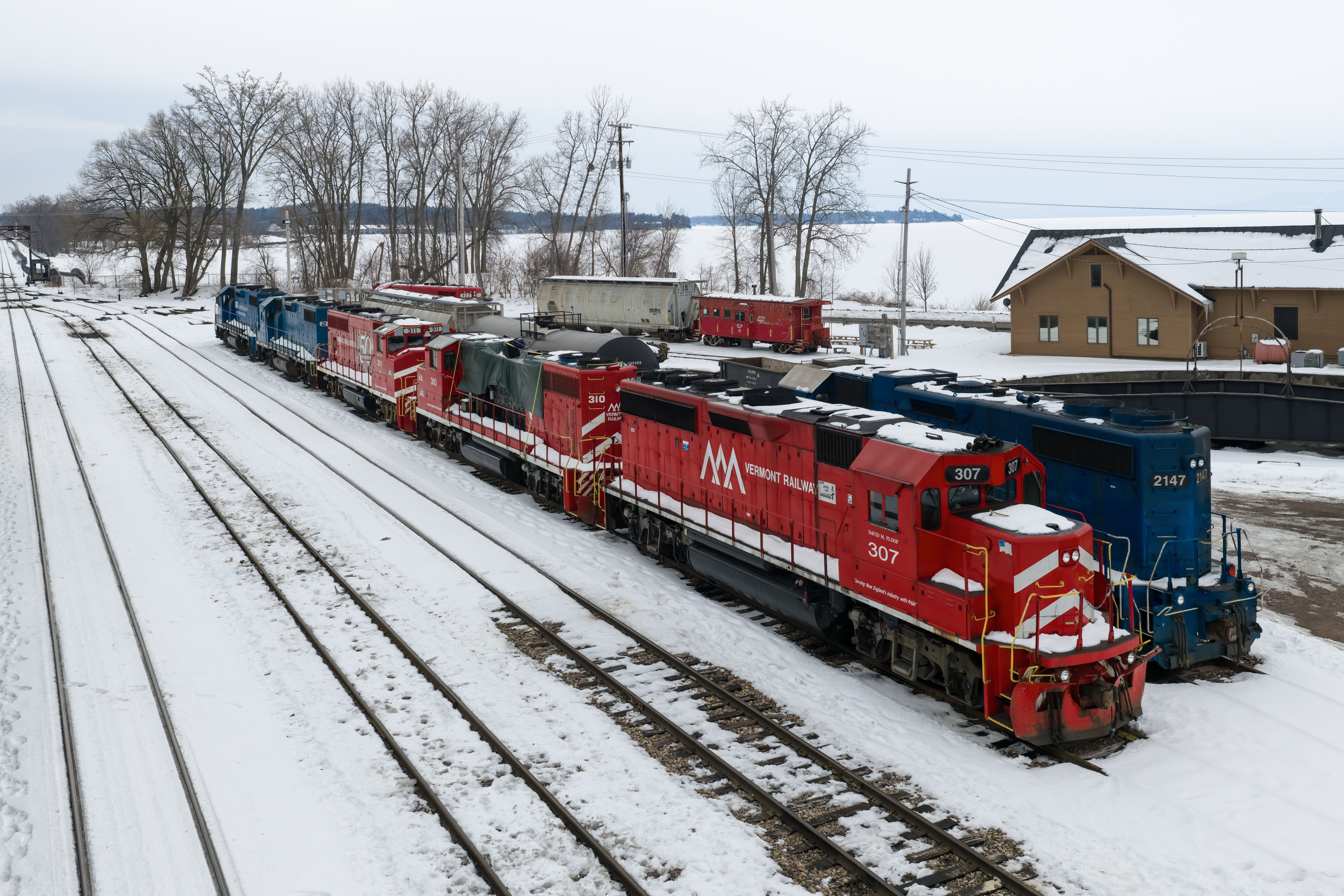
Locomotives parked at Burlington

VTR purchased the Green Mountain Railroad in 1997, which operated 52.2 miles (84.0 km) from Rutland to Bellows Falls. This led to the formation of an umbrella company, named the Vermont Rail System (VRS), which owned both railroads, as well as several other shortlines in Vermont and New York.

VTR has been the designated operator of the New York & Ogdensburg Railway for over a decade (as of 2021). This short line was once the western end of the Rutland's Ogdensburg Division and operates over the 26-mile line segment between Ogdensburg and the CSX Transportation connection at Norwood, NY.

VTR planned to construct a new 3.3-mile (5.3 km) spur line in Middlebury, Vermont, to serve a quarry. In early 2011, the company created a new subsidiary railroad called the Otter Creek Railroad to purchase land and construct trackage in preparation for construction to begin in early 2013, with a late 2014 completion date. The quarry cancelled the project in August 2012 because it was no longer economically viable.

== Routes ==
VRS owns and operates the following additional rail line:

- Connecticut River Line (104 mi (167 km) Newport, Vermont to White River Junction). This is speed-limited by the slowest track in the system to FRA class 1: 10 miles per hour (16 km/h) for freight; 15 miles per hour (24 km/h) for passengers.

== Traffic ==
VTR moves a wide variety of freight and has also hosted Amtrak's Ethan Allen Express service since 1996. VTR moves large amounts of stone products from quarries in western Vermont, largely limestone in the form of slurry from OMYA mines north of Rutland. VTR also moves large amounts of petroleum products into Vermont, including unit trains of fuel oil from Albany, New York, to Burlington. VTR operates the Champlain Valley Dinner Train, which runs from Burlington to Middlebury.

== Locomotive fleet ==
=== Current fleet ===
Locomotive details
Type	Numbers	Manufacturer	Built	Notes
GP38-2	201, 202	EMD	1972–1974	Built for VTR
GP38	204	EMD	1969	
GP38	205	EMD	1969	
GP38-3	206	EMD	1969	
GP38-3	207	EMD	1969	
GP38-2	208–212	EMD	1971–1972	
GP40-2	307, 313	EMD	1972–1984	
SD70M-2	431, 432	EMD	2006	Bought from FEC
GP18	801	EMD	1951	
GP16	802	EMD	1950	
GP9R	804	EMD	1950	

=== Former fleet ===
Locomotive details
Type	Numbers	Manufacturer	Built
Steam	97	ALCO (Cooke Works)	1923
GP38	203	EMD	1966

Preceded by Blacklands Railroad	Short Line Railroad of the Year; 2012	Succeeded by Gardendale Railroad
Preceded by R.J. Corman Railroad/Memphis Line	Short Line Railroad of the Year; 2022	Succeeded by Napoleon, Defiance & Western Railroad; Honorable mention: Eastern Idaho Railroad
