= Rutland Railroad =

Former US railway company

Rutland Railway

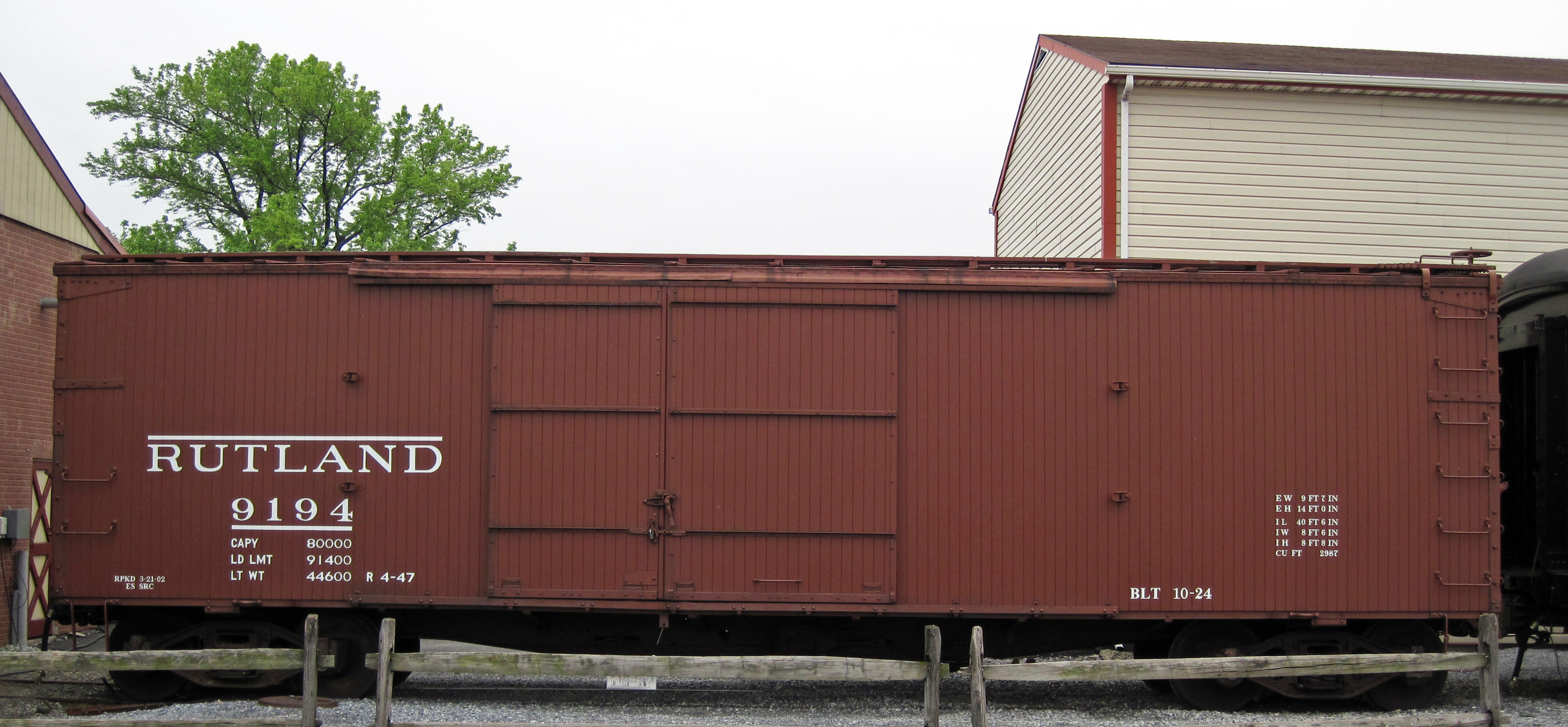
- A boxcar of the Rutland Railroad, now preserved at the Strasburg Rail Road in Pennsylvania.

Overview
- Reporting mark: RUT
- Locale: New York and Vermont
- Dates of operation: 1843–1963 (not operated 1961-1963)
- Successor: Vermont Railway

Technical
- Track gauge: 4 ft 8 1/2 in (1,435 mm) standard gauge

The Rutland Railroad (reporting mark RUT) was a railroad in the northeastern United States, located primarily in the state of Vermont but extending into the state of New York at both its northernmost and southernmost ends. After its closure in 1961, parts of the railroad were taken over by the State of Vermont in early 1963 and are now operated by the Vermont Railway.

== Construction and early years ==
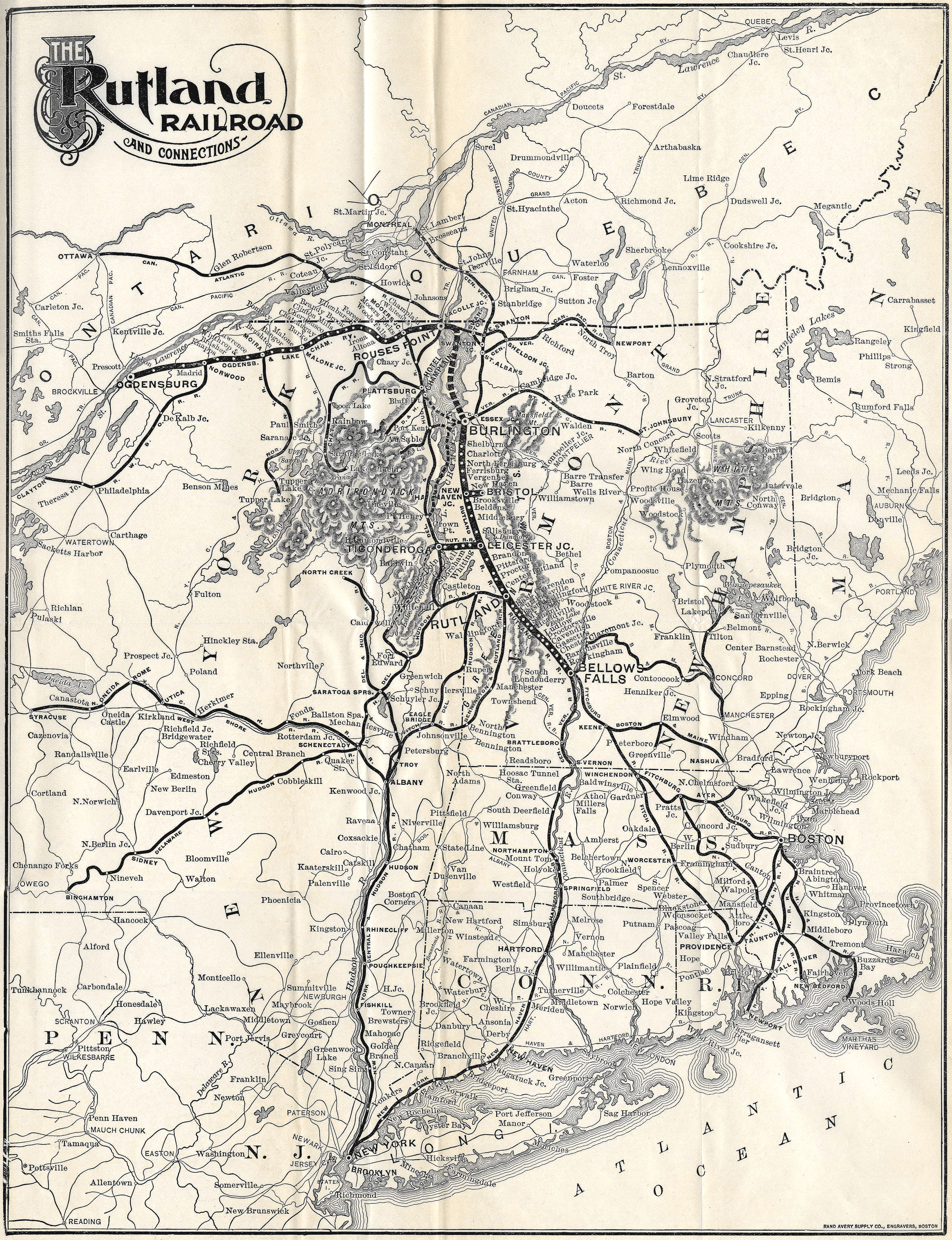
Rutland Railroad map, 1899

The earliest predecessor of the Rutland Railroad was the Rutland & Burlington Railroad (R&B), chartered in 1843 by the state of Vermont to construct a line between Rutland and Burlington. In 1855, when the Vermont legislature established the office of state railroad commissioner to oversee railway construction, maintenance, and operations, the first appointee was Charles Linsley, who served as counsel to R&B and was a member of its board of directors. Several other railroads were formed in the region during this period, and by 1867 R&B had been renamed the Rutland Railroad.

From 1871 to 1896, the Rutland Railroad was leased to the Central Vermont Railway (CV), regaining its independence after CV entered receivership. The New York Central Railroad (NYCRR) acquired a controlling interest in the Rutland in 1904 but sold half of its shares to the New York, New Haven & Hartford Railroad in 1911.

In 1901, the Rutland completed construction of a series of causeways and trestles across Lake Champlain through the Champlain Islands of South Hero and North Hero, creating a direct connection between Burlington and Rouses Point, New York. This project provided the railroad with independent access to Canada, avoiding reliance on CV trackage. Both railroads shared the bridge over the Richelieu River at Rouses Point by means of a gauntlet track, which allowed alternating use by trains without switches and limited occupancy to one train at a time.

The Rutland Railroad also operated a line from Rutland southeast to Bellows Falls on the Connecticut River, opposite North Walpole, New Hampshire. This line remains in operation under the Vermont Railway (VTR). Another line extended south from Rutland to North Bennington and onward to Chatham, New York. Chatham served as a significant junction, providing connections via NYCRR to New York City and via the Boston & Albany Railroad (B&A) to Massachusetts. The branch between North Bennington and Chatham was abandoned in 1953 and had been the first Rutland division to lose passenger service, in 1931.

The railroad operated a daytime passenger train known as the Green Mountain Flyer and a nighttime counterpart, the Mount Royal, which ran between Montreal and New York City via Burlington and Rutland.

Freight traffic on the Rutland Railroad was dominated by dairy products, particularly milk. At its maximum extent, the system comprised approximately 400 miles (640 km) of route, forming an inverted L-shape extending from Chatham north to Alburgh, Vermont, and west to Ogdensburg, New York on the St. Lawrence River. The northernmost terminus was located at Noyan, Quebec. In 1925, the railroad reported 259 million net ton-miles of revenue freight and 38 million passenger-miles over 413 miles (665 km) of road and 559 miles (900 km) of track. By 1960, traffic levels had declined to 182 million ton-miles over 391 route-miles and 476 track-miles.

== Decline ==
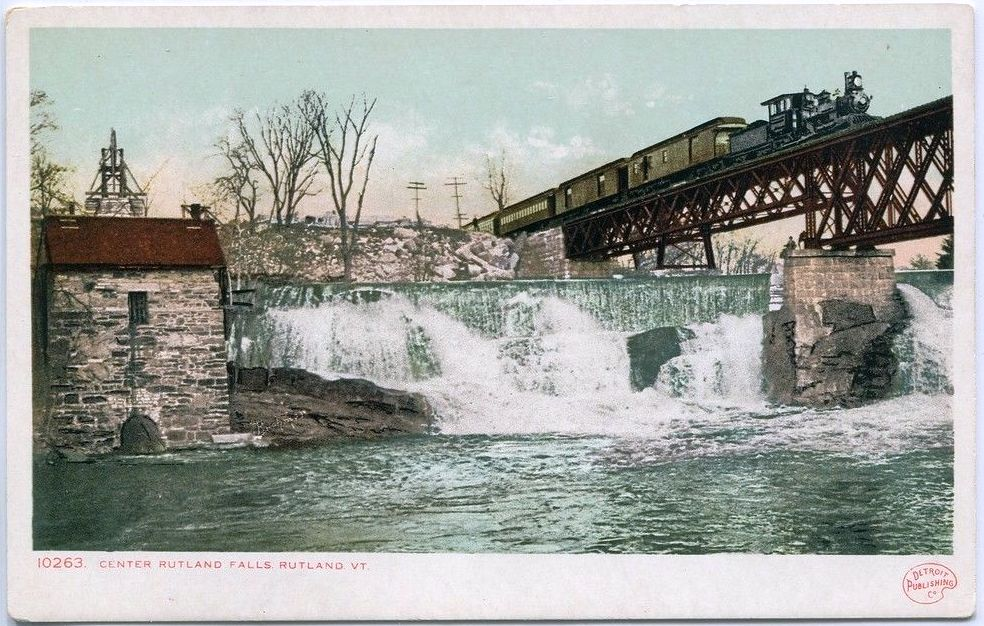
D&H Train westbound over Center Rutland Falls (Otter Creek), 1905

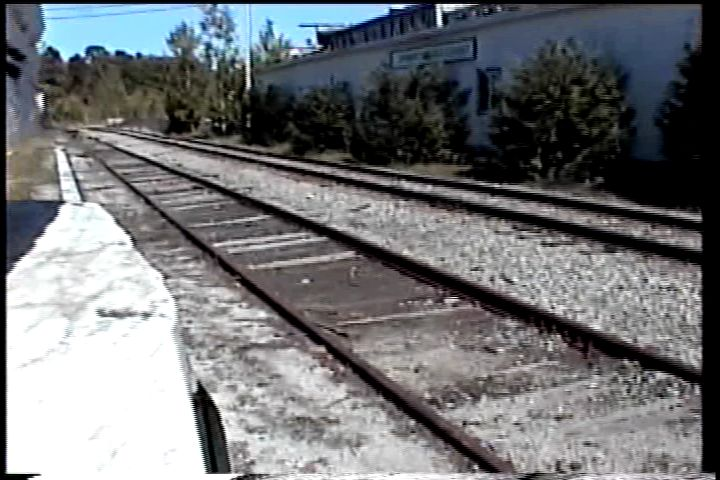
Rutland-Burlington Railroad passing through Proctor, Vermont

The Rutland Railroad entered receivership for the first time in 1938 following prolonged financial instability. In response, the company implemented cost-cutting measures, including wage reductions. The financial condition of the railroad remained sufficiently severe that, in March 1939, the State of Vermont agreed to suspend the company's tax obligations for two years in an effort to support its recovery.

A temporary increase in traffic during World War II produced a short-lived improvement in revenues. Following the war, however, declining traffic resumed and intensified, leading to renewed pressure to reduce operating costs. As part of these efforts, the Chatham Division between North Bennington, Vermont and Chatham, New York was abandoned and dismantled in 1953. This segment, characterized by numerous curves and long regarded as unprofitable, had provided connections with NYCRR's Harlem Division and B&A at Chatham. Following its removal, Rutland freight traffic was rerouted via NYCRR connections at Troy, New York.

A corporate reorganization in 1950 resulted in the railroad being renamed the Rutland Railway. In 1953, a three-week strike by employees led to the permanent discontinuation of passenger service. That same year, the railroad removed all remaining steam locomotives from active service; they were subsequently scrapped by 1955 to generate additional revenue.

In early 1961, following additional labor disputes that included demands for wage increases the company stated it could not sustain, the Rutland applied to the Interstate Commerce Commission for authority to abandon its entire system. Approval was granted, and operations ceased later that year, although formal abandonment had not yet occurred. The labor disputes stemmed in part from proposed operating changes that would have shifted the railroad's operational center from Rutland to Burlington, requiring employee relocation and extending crew run times through the introduction of overnight layovers. Under previous operating practices, crews typically completed round trips between Rutland and Burlington or Bellows Falls within a single day, as well as runs between Malone, New York and Ogdensburg.

In 1961, the State of Vermont petitioned the bankruptcy court to delay liquidation of the railroad for scrap value. The court granted the state two years to identify a new operator in order to preserve the possibility of continued rail service. When no private operator was secured, the state purchased substantial portions of the line in 1963. Following formal abandonment in 1963, much of the remaining right-of-way, track, and facilities were acquired by the State of Vermont through the bankruptcy proceedings. A 132.4-mile segment between Union Station in Burlington and Norwood, New York, via the Champlain Islands, Alburgh, Rouses Point, and Malone, was closed in 1961, formally abandoned in 1963, and dismantled in 1964. The removal of this segment left Malone without rail service, following the earlier abandonment of the northern portion of NYCRR's Adirondack Division through the village in 1960.

The westernmost 26 miles of the Rutland's Ogdensburg Division, between Ogdensburg and Norwood, remain in service and are operated by VTR. As a result, all remaining former Rutland trackage is now operated by a single company. Ownership of the former roadbed between Norwood and Burlington has since been dispersed. Portions have been converted to recreational rail trail use, including a 21-mile segment between Norwood and Moira that forms part of the multi-use Rutland Trail. Other former sections have been incorporated into the Hudson & Delaware, Corkscrew, and Alburgh Recreation rail trails, respectively.

Passenger service returned to the Rutland–Burlington route in 2022, when Amtrak extended the Ethan Allen Express to Burlington.

=== Steamtown ===
Prior to its relocation to Scranton, Pennsylvania, the Steamtown Foundation operated excursion trains from its museum site near Bellows Falls to Chester, Vermont. Following Steamtown's departure, additional tourist operations were conducted over portions of the former Rutland Railroad using original rolling stock.

== See also ==
- Phineas Gage
