= Delaware & Hudson Railroad Station =

Delaware & Hudson Railroad Depot, Delaware & Hudson Depot or Delaware & Hudson Station may refer to several New York stations formerly serving the Delaware & Hudson Railroad:

- Fort Edward station
- Plattsburgh station
- Port Henry station
- Port Kent station
- Rouses Point station
- Saratoga Springs station
- Ticonderoga station
- Westport station (New York)
- Whitehall station
