= Poe (disambiguation) =

Edgar Allan Poe (1809–1849) was an American writer.

Poe, PoE or POE may also refer to:

== Places ==
- Poe, Indiana, an unincorporated community in the US
- Poe, Alberta
- Poe, West Virginia
- 17427 Poe, an asteroid
- Poe, a settlement in the Nzérékoré Prefecture, Guinea
- Poe (crater), a crater on Mercury

== Science and technology ==
- Polyolester oil, synthetic oil used in some refrigeration compressors
- Polyoxyethylene

=== Computing ===
- Perl Object Environment, a library for event-driven multitasking for the Perl programming language
- Power over Ethernet (PoE), combining data and power supply via Ethernet cabling
- PowerOpen Environment, an open standard for running a Unix-based operating system on the PowerPC computer architecture
- Product of experts (PoE), a machine learning technique
- Poe (software) (Platform for Open Exploration), a service developed by Quora that allows users to ask questions and obtain answers from a range of AI bots
- Parity Outer Error, a type of error on a DVD, see DVD § Disc quality measurements.

== Games ==
- Pillars of Eternity, a 2015 role playing game by Obsidian Entertainment
- Path of Exile, a 2013 action role playing game by Grinding Gear Games

== People and characters ==
- Poe Ballantine (born 1955), American author
- Poe (singer) (born 1968), American singer/songwriter
- Poe (surname), a surname (and list of people with the name)
- Poe (mascot), a mascot of the Baltimore Ravens National Football League team
- Poe, a character in the series Ruby Gloom
- Poe, an AI character in the series Altered Carbon
- Poe, an uglydoll
- Poe, a ghost-like enemy in The Legend of Zelda series
- Poe Dameron, a Resistance pilot in the Star Wars sequel trilogy
- Poe De Spell, brother of Magica De Spell in Ducktales
- Poe, A violetish indigo crow from Poppy Playtime as one of the Nightmare Critters.

== Other uses ==
- Post-occupancy evaluation, of a building or space
- Port of entry, a place where one may lawfully enter a country
- Poe's law, which states that a sufficiently sophisticated parody of extremism is indistinguishable from the real thing
- Place of Employment, the address a repossessor, skip tracer, or process server will use to find a debtor or the debtor's collateral
- Poe Lock, one of the Soo Locks allowing access between Lake Superior and the lower Great Lakes, North America
- Jiaobei, wooden divination tools originating from China
  - Poe divination

== See also ==
- Peace on Earth (disambiguation)
- Po (disambiguation)
- Purity of Essence (disambiguation)
