= Port Kent station =

Railroad station in Port Kent, New York

Port Kent, NY
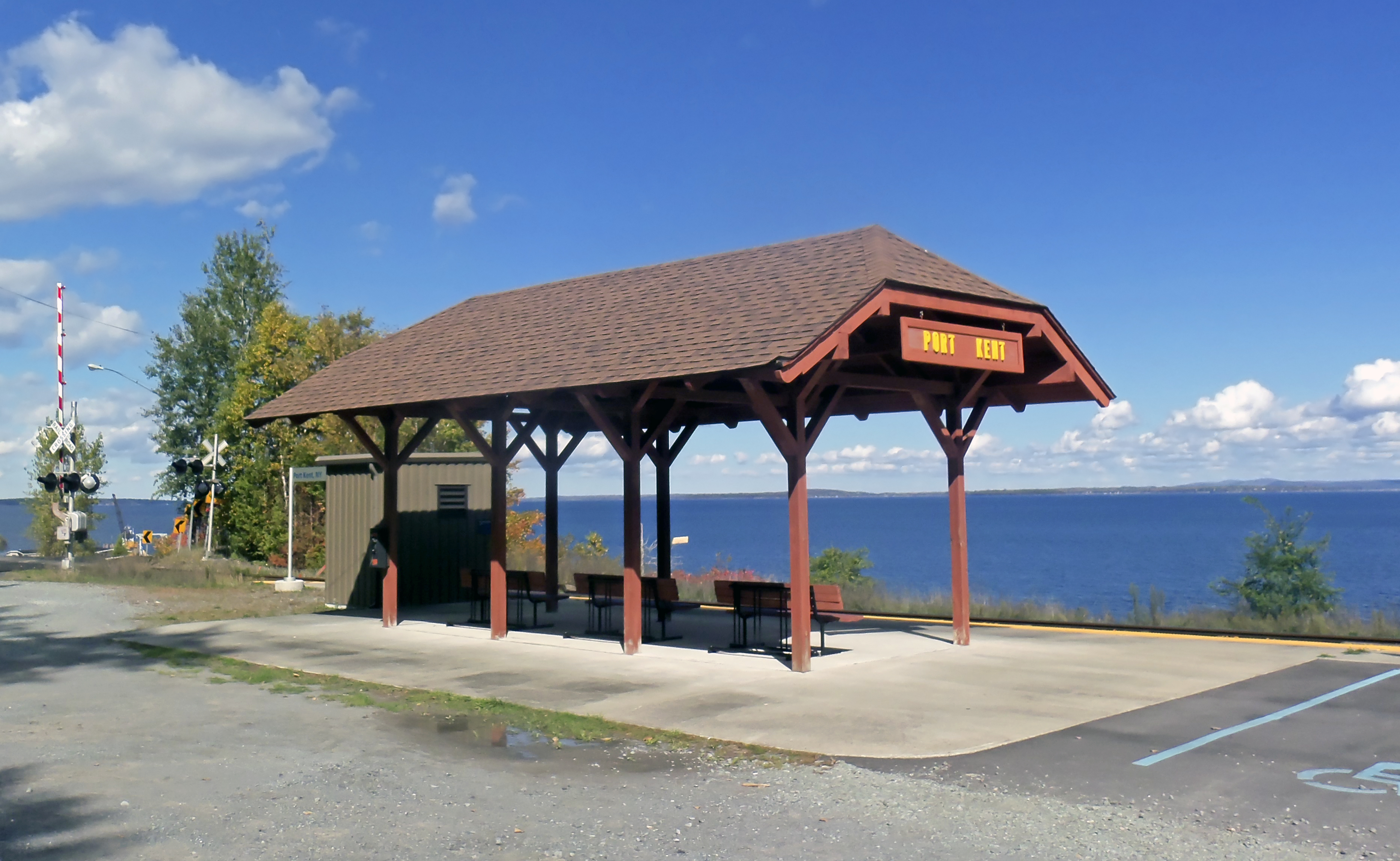
- Station shelter, with Lake Champlain in the background, in 2012

General information
- Location: NY 373 and Lake Street; Port Kent, New York; United States
- Coordinates: 44.5240°N 73.4035°W
- Owner: Amtrak
- Line: Canadian Subdivision
- Platforms: 1 side platform
- Tracks: 1
- Connections: Burlington–Port Kent Ferry

Construction
- Accessible: Yes

Other information
- Status: Temporarily closed
- Station code: Amtrak: PRK

History
- Opened: April 24, 1977

Passengers
- FY 2025: no data (Amtrak)

Services
Preceding station	Amtrak	Following station
Plattsburgh toward Montreal	Adirondack	Westport toward New York
Former services
Preceding station	Amtrak	Following station
Plattsburgh toward Montreal	Adirondack	Willsboro Closed 1987 toward New York
Preceding station	Delaware and Hudson Railway	Following station
Valcour toward Rouses Point	Main Line	Douglass toward Albany
Location

Port Kent station is a temporarily closed Amtrak intercity train station in Port Kent, New York, normally served by the Adirondack. It is only served when the Lake Champlain Transportation Company Port Kent–Burlington Ferry is in operation – typically from May to October (typically Columbus Day). The station has one low-level side platform on the west side of the single track.

The Delaware and Hudson Railroad built a freight station on the shores of Port Kent sometime between 1875 and 1876, and an open shelter in 1911, similar to the existing one. Amtrak has stopped at Port Kent since April 24, 1977, with a wood shelter added in 1989. In March 2020, the Adirondack was cancelled north of Albany–Rensselaer after all non-essential travel across the Canada–United States border was banned in response to the COVID-19 pandemic. Service resumed on April 3, 2023; however, the stop at Port Kent remained closed because ferry service remained suspended.
