= Ticonderoga station =

Amtrak intercity train station in Ticonderoga, New York

Ticonderoga, NY
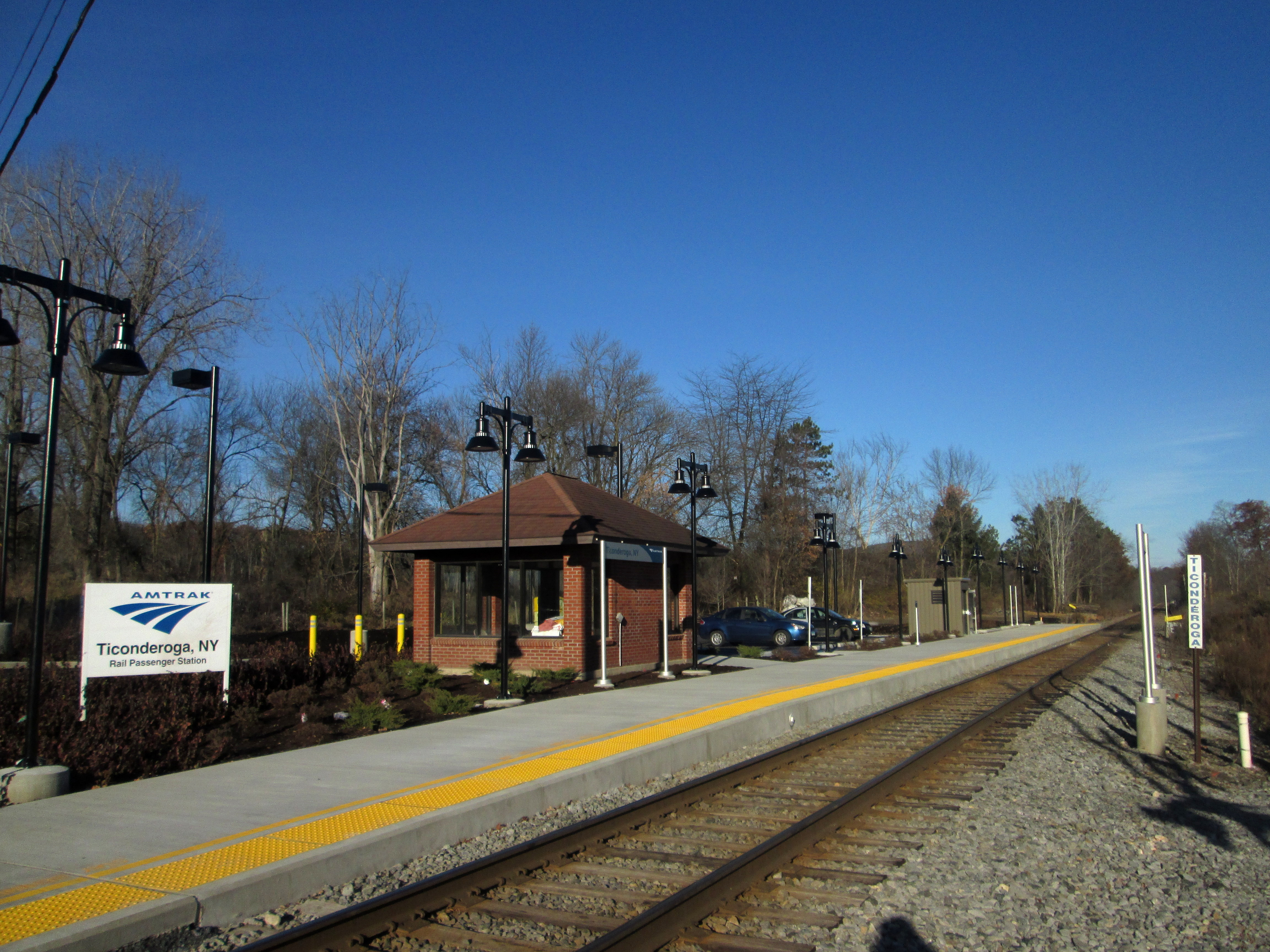
- Ticonderoga station in 2013

General information
- Location: NY 74 and Sandy Redoubt; Ticonderoga, New York; United States
- Coordinates: 43.8538°N 73.3897°W
- Owner: Amtrak
- Line: Canadian Subdivision
- Platforms: 1 side platform
- Tracks: 1
- Connections: Fort Ticonderoga–Shoreham Ferry

Construction
- Accessible: Yes

Other information
- Station code: Amtrak: FTC

History
- Opened: August 6, 1974
- Closed: April 30, 1971
- Rebuilt: August 13, 1991

Passengers
- FY 2025: 1,750 (Amtrak)

Services
Preceding station	Amtrak	Following station
Port Henry toward Montreal	Adirondack	Whitehall toward New York
Former services
Preceding station	Delaware and Hudson Railway	Following station
Crown Point toward Rouses Point	Main Line at Fort Ticonderoga (prior to 1933)	Montcalm Landing toward Albany
Preceding station	Rutland Railroad	Following station
Terminus	Addison Branch	Larrabees Point toward Leicester Junction
Location

Ticonderoga station (often called Fort Ticonderoga station) is an Amtrak intercity train station in Ticonderoga, New York. It is served by the single daily round trip of the Adirondack. The station is located about 2 miles (3.2 km) east of downtown Ticonderoga and 0.2 miles (0.32 km) west of the Fort Ticonderoga–Shoreham Ferry landing. It has one low-level side platform on the west side of the single track.

== History ==
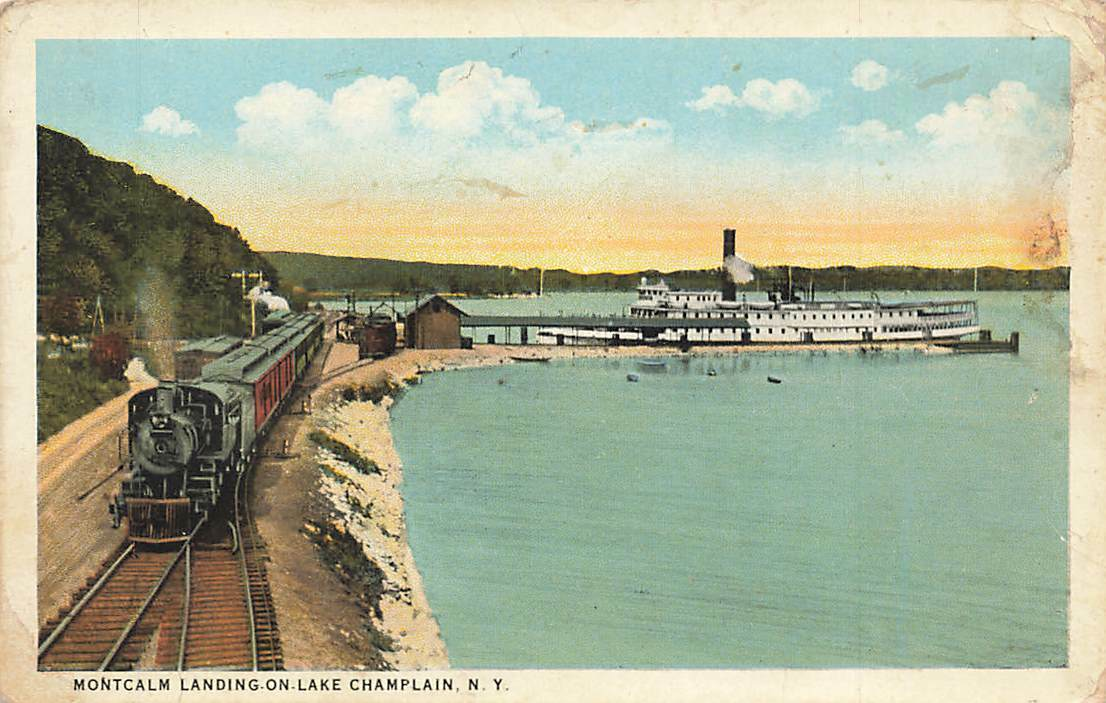
Circa-1930 postcard of Montcalm Landing

The Whitehall and Plattsburgh Railroad opened from Fort Ticonderoga to Port Henry in 1870. It became part of the New York and Canada Railroad, owned by the Delaware and Hudson Railway (D&H); its Albany–Rouses Point route (with a connection to Montreal) was completed in 1875. The Addison Railroad opened from Leicester, Vermont to Addison Junction – on the D&H north of Fort Ticonderoga – in 1871, and was soon leased by the Rutland Railroad.

In 1875, the D&H opened its Baldwin Branch from the mainline to Baldwin Dock on Lake George. It met the mainline just north of the new Montcalm Landing, which served ferries on Lake Champlain. The D&H station at Montcalm Landing was known as Fort Ticonderoga. A short branch off the Baldwin Branch into downtown Ticonderoga opened in 1890.

In October 1911, Addison Junction station was renamed Fort Ticonderoga, with Fort Ticonderoga becoming Montcalm Landing. The Addison Branch bridge over Lake Champlain was embargoed in 1917 and officially abandoned in 1923. Fort Ticonderoga station was closed in 1933, with Montcalm Landing reverting back to the Fort Ticonderoga name. Passenger service on the Baldwin and Ticonderoga branches ended by 1935, leaving Fort Ticonderoga station as the only station serving Ticonderoga.

The station building was demolished around 1962 and replaced with a small shelter. The Laurentian continued to make a flag stop there until it was discontinued on April 30, 1971, upon the formation of Amtrak. Amtrak restored service on the line with the Adirondack on August 6, 1974; it served the shelter at the former Montcalm Landing location. The current station opened on August 13, 1991, at the former Addison Junction site.
