= Poh (disambiguation) =

Poh is the tenth month in the Nanakshahi calendar.

Poh, POH or pOH may refer to:

- Poh, Hokkien pronunciation of a Chinese surname, a variant of 傅
- Poh Ling Yeow (born 1973), a Malaysian-Australian artist and chef
- Pok Oi Hospital, a hospital in Yuen Long, Hong Kong
- Power-on hours, the length of time, in hours, that electrical power is applied to a device
- POH, Amtrak station code for Port Henry (Amtrak station), New York, United States
- Pilot's Operating Handbook, a standardized aircraft flight manual for a specific aircraft
- A Player-Owned House in RuneScape, which is created by the Construction skill
- pOH, a measure of the concentration of hydroxide ions
- Progressive osseous heteroplasia, a rare genetic disorder

== See also ==
- Po (disambiguation)
