= Master Po =

Master Po may refer to:

- Master Po, a fictional character in the 1972 TV series Kung Fu
- Po (Kung Fu Panda), the title character in the Kung Fu Panda franchise

== See also ==
- Master (disambiguation)
- Po (disambiguation)
