= Rouses Point Subdivision =

Railway line in southwestern Quebec, Canada

Overview
- Owner: Canadian National Railway
- Termini: Saint-Lambert; Rouses Point

Service
- Services: Adirondack

History
- Opened: 21 July 1836

Technical
- Line length: 42.7 mi (68.7 km)
- Track gauge: 1,435 mm (4 ft 8 1/2 in) standard gauge

The Rouses Point Subdivision is a railway line in southwestern Quebec. It runs north–south from the northern end of Canadian Subdivision, on the border with New York, to the St-Hyacinthe Subdivision of the Quebec City–Windsor Corridor, in the vicinity of Montreal. The oldest part of the line was the original main line of the Champlain and St. Lawrence Railroad, completed in 1836. Today, the Canadian National Railway owns the line. Amtrak's Adirondack operates over the full length, providing daily service between New York City and Montreal.

== Route ==
The Rouses Point Subdivision begins north of the Amtrak station at Rouses Point, at a junction with the Canadian Subdivision. At Cantic, 5 miles (8.0 km) from Rouses Point, it connects with the Swanton Subdivision. It crosses the Adirondack Subdivision west of Saint-Jean-sur-Richelieu. It joins the St-Hyacinthe Subdivision near Saint-Lambert.

Amtrak's Adirondack uses the entirety of the line, providing daily service between New York City and Montreal. Poor track conditions on the line caused multiple service suspensions in the 2020s.

== History ==
The original main line of the Champlain and St. Lawrence Railroad ran from St. Johns (now Saint-Jean-sur-Richelieu) west to La Prairie, on the Saint Lawrence River. This line opened on July 21, 1836. The company operated its own ferry service between La Prairie and Montreal. From Saint-Jean-sur-Richelieu, on the Richelieu River, the Champlain Transportation Company provided service over Lake Champlain to points south.

In 1851, the Champlain and St. Lawrence built south from St. Johns to Rouses Point, New York. There, it connected with the Northern Railroad and the Vermont and Canada Railroad. This extension opened on August 16, 1851. In the north, the company extended its line to Saint-Lambert and abandoned the original line to La Prairie. The new northern line opened on January 14, 1852.

The Champlain and St. Lawrence merged with the Montreal and New York Railroad in 1857 to form the Montreal and Champlain Railroad. The Grand Trunk Railway leased that company in 1863 and acquired it outright in 1873. The Canadian government nationalized the Grand Trunk in 1923, and it became part of the Canadian National Railways (later shortened to Canadian National Railway).

In 1960, construction of the Champlain Bridge prompted the Canadian National to abandon the northern 5 miles (8.0 km) of the original extension to Saint-Lambert. It constructed a new 4-mile (6.4 km) line to connect with the Granby Subdivision in Longueuil.
