= Depot Theatre =

Theatre in Westport, New York

The Depot Theatre is located in Westport, NY, in Westport station a landmarked former train station. It is an active professional theatre, offering plays and musicals in the summer months.

== Train station ==
It was built as a train station and still is one, although few trains travel through Westport station. It is located on the tracks connecting New York City with Montreal, Canada. Originally constructed in 1876 for the Delaware and Hudson Company, the Westport train station was expanded in 1908. In 1974, it was acquired by the municipality, allowing the Westport Historical Society to turn it into a theatre space.

== Re-purposed in 1978 ==
Carol Buchanan had plans to save the train station and convert it to a theater. Beginning in 1979, she held weekly community bingo fundraisers to finance the project.

The theatre now seats roughly 120.

== 2026 productions ==
- Tick, Tick… Boom! A musical by Jonathan Larson
- Incident at Our Lady of Perpetual Help. A play about family life in the USA of the 1970s
- Ring of Fire: The Music of Johnny Cash
