= P0 =

P0 or p0 may refer to:

- P0 protein
- Standard atmospheric pressure of 101325 Pa
- Neutronium, hypothetically occupying Period 0 in the periodic table
- Proflight Zambia IATA airline designator

== See also ==
- 0P (disambiguation)
- PO (disambiguation)
