= 0P =

0P (zero P) or 0-P may refer to:

- 0-polytope, a geometric form; see Zero-dimensional space
- 0-point energy or zero-point energy, the lowest possible energy that a quantum mechanical physical system may have
- 0-point field, or the vacuum state in quantum field theory
- 0 passer rating, an American football statistic; see List of NFL quarterbacks who have posted a passer rating of zero
- 0 polynomial, a type of polynomial
- 0 page, or null page, the series of memory addresses at the absolute beginning of a computer's address space

== See also ==
- P0 (disambiguation)
- OP (disambiguation)
