= Adirondack (train) =

Amtrak service between New York City and Montreal

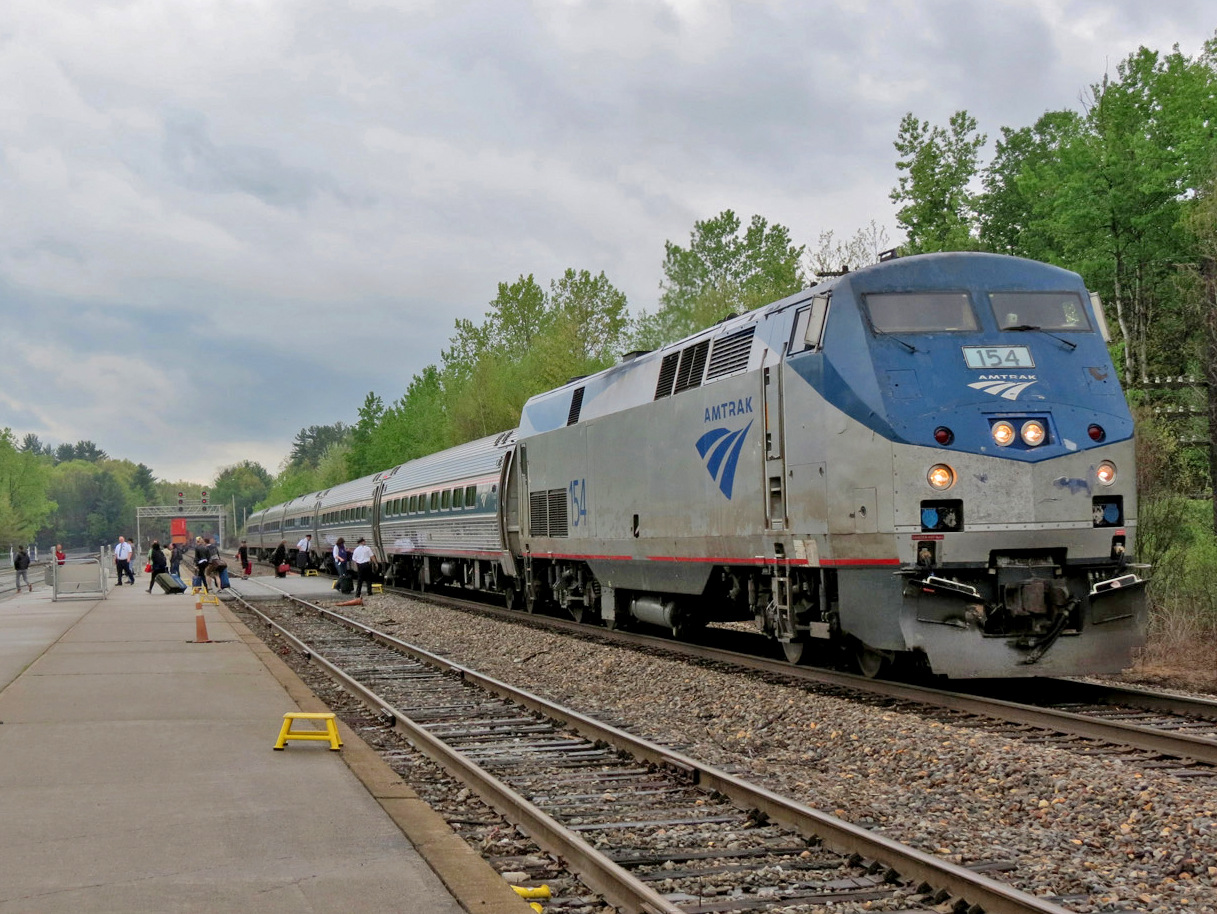
- The Adirondack at Saratoga Springs station in 2013

Overview
- Service type: Inter-city rail
- Locale: Hudson Valley
- Predecessor: Laurentian (D&H)
- First service: August 6, 1974
- Current operator: Amtrak
- Annual ridership: 83,938 (FY 25) ▲21.4% (Note: Amtrak's Fiscal Year (FY) runs from October 1 of the prior year to September 30 of the named year.)

Route
- Termini: Montreal, Quebec; New York City, New York
- Stops: 19
- Distance travelled: 381 miles (613 km)
- Average journey time: 11 hours 41 minutes (New York City to Montreal); 11 hours 5 minutes (Montreal to New York City)
- Service frequency: Daily
- Train number: 68, 69

On-board services
- Class: Coach Class
- Disabled access: All cars, most stations
- Catering facilities: Café car
- Baggage facilities: Overhead racks

Technical
- Rolling stock: Amfleet coaches
- Track gauge: 4 ft 8 1/2 in (1,435 mm) standard gauge
- Operating speed: 35 mph (56 km/h) (avg.); 110 mph (180 km/h) (top)
- Track owners: MNRR, CSX, CPKC, CN

The Adirondack is a daily intercity passenger train operated by Amtrak between New York City and Montreal. The scenic route follows the Empire Corridor through the Hudson Valley with major stops in Yonkers, Poughkeepsie, Albany–Rensselaer, and Schenectady. North of Saratoga Springs the route runs between the Adirondack Mountains and Lake Champlain until crossing the Canada–United States border at Rouses Point. Trains take approximately 11 hours to travel the 381-mile (613 km) route.

Canadian track maintenance issues led to the suspension of the Adirondack from June to September in 2023 and 2024.

Operation of the Adirondack is supported by the New York State Department of Transportation and Via Rail. Amtrak reported that Adirondack served 83,938 passengers in fiscal year 2025, down from a pre-COVID-19 pandemic ridership peak of 117,490 in FY2019.

== History ==
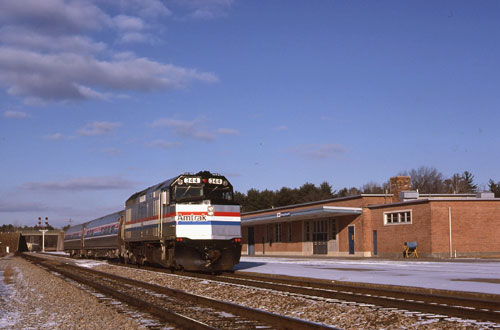
The Adirondack at Saratoga Springs in 1980

At the inception of Amtrak on May 1, 1971, the Delaware and Hudson Railway (D&H) operated two trains between Albany, New York and Montreal: the Montreal Limited (overnight) and the Laurentian (day). Both trains were discontinued, and for three years the D&H main line saw no service. Amtrak service to Montreal began in 1972 with the Montrealer, which ran through Vermont rather than New York.

The Adirondack began running on August 6, 1974 (with a ceremonial train the previous day) from Grand Central Terminal in New York to Albany, then over the D&H's line to Windsor Station in Montreal. From the outset the train operated with financial support from the state of New York. The train initially operated as a section of the New York–Buffalo Empire State Express.

Initially, the Adirondack used the same routing as its D&H predecessors, running over the former Rensselaer and Saratoga Railroad via Watervliet and Mechanicville, New York, and over the Schenectady–Mechanicville freight bypass to Saratoga. With the April 30, 1978, timetable change, the Adirondack dropped both stops but continued to use the route. The train was re-routed via Schenectady on October 29, 1978, but did not start stopping there until January 29, 1979. Both termini have shifted since service began. In Montreal, the Adirondack moved to the Canadian National Railway's Central Station on January 12, 1986. In New York City, the opening of the Empire Connection on April 8, 1991, allowed the Adirondack to serve Penn Station instead of Grand Central.

=== 21st century ===
As part of an effort to improve on-time performance along the Empire Corridor, Amtrak reached an agreement with CSX to lease the CSX Hudson Subdivision between Poughkeepsie and Schenectady. Starting in 2012, Amtrak effectively took operational control of the Hudson Subdivision, handling all maintenance and capital responsibilities. Even with this move, Amtrak still operates less than half of the trackage along the Adirondack route.

In 2012, U.S. Customs and Border Protection began planning a preclearance facility at Montreal Central Station, which would allow departing passengers to be prescreened in Montreal, where northbound passengers would be processed by the Canada Border Services Agency upon arrival, rather than at the border itself. Presently, the Adirondack must stop at Lacolle, Quebec northbound and Rouses Point, New York southbound for immigration procedures that can take up to two hours. By early 2017, the United States Congress had passed its necessary enabling legislation. The corresponding Canadian legislation was given royal assent in late 2017 and came into force in 2019.

All trains using the Empire Connection, excluding the Lake Shore Limited, operated into Grand Central Terminal from May 26 to September 4, 2018, to allow work on the Empire Tunnel, the Spuyten Duyvil movable bridge, and Penn Station. For most of the summer of 2019, the northbound Adirondack ran combined with the northbound Maple Leaf due to infrastructure work at Penn Station, splitting in Albany. The two trains ran separately on weekends during July and August.

=== COVID-19 pandemic and track issues ===
In March 2020, the Adirondack was truncated to Albany–Rensselaer after all non-essential travel across the Canada–United States border was banned in response to the COVID-19 pandemic. In July 2021, that truncated service was replaced by the resumption of Ethan Allen Express service, which overlaps the Adirondack between New York City and Fort Edward. Weekday service from New York City to Albany resumed on December 5, 2022. Full service resumption to Montreal took place on April 3, 2023; the Port Kent stop remained closed, as service on the Port Kent-Burlington Ferry remained suspended indefinitely.

The Canadian National Railway (CN) owns the Rouses Point Subdivision, a 42-mile (68 km) section of track that runs from Rouses Point, New York, to the vicinity of Montreal. During the COVID-19 suspension track conditions "deteriorat[ed]", forcing Amtrak to lengthen an already long running time between Rouses Point and Montreal. Citing a concern over heat kinks, CN imposed a 10 miles per hour (16 km/h) speed restriction when temperatures exceeded 30 °C (86 °F), leading to one trip over in mid-June taking four hours. On June 26, Amtrak suspended service "until further notice" north of Albany over the track conditions. Amtrak criticized "inconsistent application of CN's historical heat order policy"; CN claimed that Amtrak had failed to pay for maintenance to the track, which Amtrak disputed. Adirondack service was extended to Saratoga Springs on July 24, 2023, to serve the Saratoga Race Course meet. Trains were turned using a Canadian Pacific Kansas City (CPKC) wye near Saratoga Springs. Montreal service resumed on September 11.

The Adirondack was again suspended north of Saratoga Springs on May 20, 2024, due to unspecified track work. On May 17, 2024, Amtrak and CN announced an agreement under which Amtrak would pay CN to perform track work on the line, which would "mitigate, but not eliminate", heat-related slow orders. The suspension was originally intended to end on June 29; however, in early June it was extended to mid-September. Service resumed on September 9 with track work not completed. The Adirondack and Maple Leaf were combined between New York and Albany–Rensselaer beginning November 10, 2024, due to construction work in the East River Tunnels limiting capacity at Penn Station. This was reversed effective December 2, 2024, through at least March 2025.

== Operation ==
=== Equipment ===
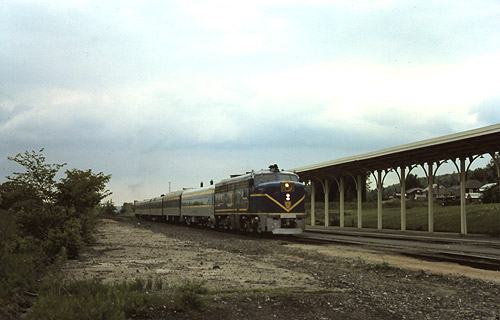
The Adirondack with D&H equipment in 1976

Most Adirondack trains consist of five to seven cars hauled by a locomotive.

The passenger cars are the Amfleet I series built by the Budd Company in the mid-1970s to early-1980s. Most trains include a Café car (food service/lounge) and four to six Coach Class cars. Unlike other Empire Corridor trains, the Adirondack does not offer business class seating.

All cars offer complimentary WiFi, an electric outlet (120 V, 60 Hz AC) at each seat, reading lamps, and fold-out tray tables. Passengers self-select seats on a first-come, first-served basis. Reservations are required on all trains; tickets may be purchased online, from an agent at some stations, a ticketing machine at most stations, or, at a higher cost, from the conductor on the train.

Between New York City and Albany–Rensselaer, trains are pulled by a GE Genesis P32AC-DM dual-mode diesel locomotive at speeds up to 110 mph (177 km/h). The locomotives operate on third rail electric power in Penn Station and the Empire Connection tunnel and on diesel power for the rest of the route. Between Albany–Rensselaer and Montréal, diesel-only GE Genesis P42DC locomotives are used.

The Adirondack debuted in 1974 with D&H equipment, much of it from the Laurentian, as Amtrak was experiencing equipment shortages. These were supplemented by a pair of Skyline dome cars leased from the Canadian Pacific Railway. Two D&H ALCO PA diesel locomotives hauled each train. On March 1, 1977, new Turboliner gas turbine trainsets took over from the D&H cars. Conventional Amtrak equipment would eventually displace the Turboliners.

In the coming years all equipment will be replaced with Amtrak Airo trainsets, the railroad's branding of its combination of Siemens Venture passenger cars and a Siemens Charger diesel-electric locomotive. The trainsets for the Adirondack will have six passenger cars, which will include a cab control car, a food service area, and a mix of 2x2 Coach Class and 2x1 Business Class seating. The car closest to the locomotive will have batteries to supply electricity to traction motors in the locomotive when operating in Penn Station and the Empire Connection tunnel, eliminating the need for third rail propulsion. The arrangement will eliminate the time-consuming locomotive change at Albany–Rensselaer.

=== Route ===
The Adirondack operates over Canadian National Railway, Canadian Pacific Kansas City, CSX Transportation, Metro-North Railroad and Amtrak rails:

- CN St-Hyacinthe Subdivision, Montreal to Southwark: 6.15 mi (9.90 km)
- CN Rouses Point Subdivision, Southwark to Rouses Point: 42.7 mi (68.7 km)
- CPKC Canadian Subdivision, Rouses Point to Ballston: 169.3 mi (272.5 km)
- CPKC Freight Subdivision, Ballston to Schenectady: 4.6 mi (7.4 km)
- CSX Hudson Subdivision, Schenectady to Poughkeepsie (trackage leased by Amtrak): 86.3 mi (138.9 km)
- Metro-North Hudson Line, Poughkeepsie to Spuyten Duyvil: 61.8 mi (99.5 km)
- Amtrak Empire Connection, Spuyten Duyvil to Penn Station 11.4 mi (18.3 km)

== Stations ==
State/ Province	Town/City	Mile (km)	Station	Connections/Notes
Quebec	Montreal	0	Montreal	Via Rail: Québec City–Windsor Corridor, Ocean, Montreal–Jonquière, Montreal–Senneterre; Exo: Mont-Saint-Hilaire line Réseau express métropolitain Montreal Metro: Orange; STM Bus
Quebec	Saint-Lambert	4 (6.4)	Saint-Lambert	Via Rail: Québec City–Windsor Corridor, Ocean; Exo: Mont-Saint-Hilaire line RTL
Canada–United States border
New York	Rouses Point	49 (79)	Rouses Point	
New York	Plattsburgh	72 (116)	Plattsburgh	Clinton County Public Transit (at Government Center)
New York	Port Kent	85 (137)	Port Kent	Lake Champlain Transportation: seasonal ferry to Burlington, Vermont. Train service has been suspended since the Adirondack resumed due to the suspension of ferry service.
New York	Westport	112 (180)	Westport	Amtrak Thruway to Lake Placid
New York	Port Henry	123 (198)	Port Henry	
New York	Ticonderoga	140 (230)	Ticonderoga	Fort Ticonderoga Ferry: seasonal ferry to Shoreham, Vermont
New York	Whitehall	162 (261)	Whitehall	
New York	Fort Edward	184 (296)	Fort Edward	Amtrak: Ethan Allen Express; Capital District Transportation Authority
New York	Saratoga Springs	203 (327)	Saratoga Springs	Amtrak: Ethan Allen Express; Capital District Transportation Authority
New York	Schenectady	222 (357)	Schenectady	Amtrak: Empire Service, Ethan Allen Express, Lake Shore Limited, Maple Leaf Capital District Transportation Authority
New York	Rensselaer	240 (390)	Albany–Rensselaer	Amtrak: Berkshire Flyer, Empire Service, Ethan Allen Express, Lake Shore Limited, Maple Leaf; Capital District Transportation Authority
New York	Hudson	268 (431)	Hudson	Amtrak: Berkshire Flyer, Empire Service, Ethan Allen Express, Maple Leaf
New York	Rhinecliff	293 (472)	Rhinecliff	Amtrak: Berkshire Flyer, Empire Service, Ethan Allen Express, Maple Leaf
New York	Poughkeepsie	309 (497)	Poughkeepsie	Amtrak: Berkshire Flyer, Empire Service, Ethan Allen Express, Lake Shore Limited, Maple Leaf; Metro-North Railroad: ■ Hudson Line; Dutchess County Public Transit, Ulster County Area Transit
New York	Croton-on-Hudson	349 (562)	Croton–Harmon	Amtrak: Berkshire Flyer, Empire Service, Ethan Allen Express, Lake Shore Limited, Maple Leaf; Metro-North Railroad: ■ Hudson Line; Bee-Line Bus System
New York	Yonkers	367 (591)	Yonkers	Amtrak: Berkshire Flyer, Empire Service, Ethan Allen Express, Maple Leaf; Metro-North Railroad: ■ Hudson Line; Bee-Line Bus System
New York	New York City	381 (613)	Penn Station	Amtrak (long-distance): Cardinal, Crescent, Lake Shore Limited, Palmetto, Silver Meteor; Amtrak (intercity): Acela, Berkshire Flyer, Carolinian, Empire Service, Ethan Allen Express, Keystone Service, Maple Leaf, Northeast Regional, Pennsylvanian, Vermonter; LIRR: ■ City Terminal Zone, ■ Port Washington Branch; NJ Transit: ■ North Jersey Coast Line, ■ Northeast Corridor Line, ■ Gladstone Branch, ■ Montclair–Boonton Line, ■ Morristown Line; NYC Subway: MTA Bus
