= Westport station (New York) =

Intercity train station in New York state

Westport, NY
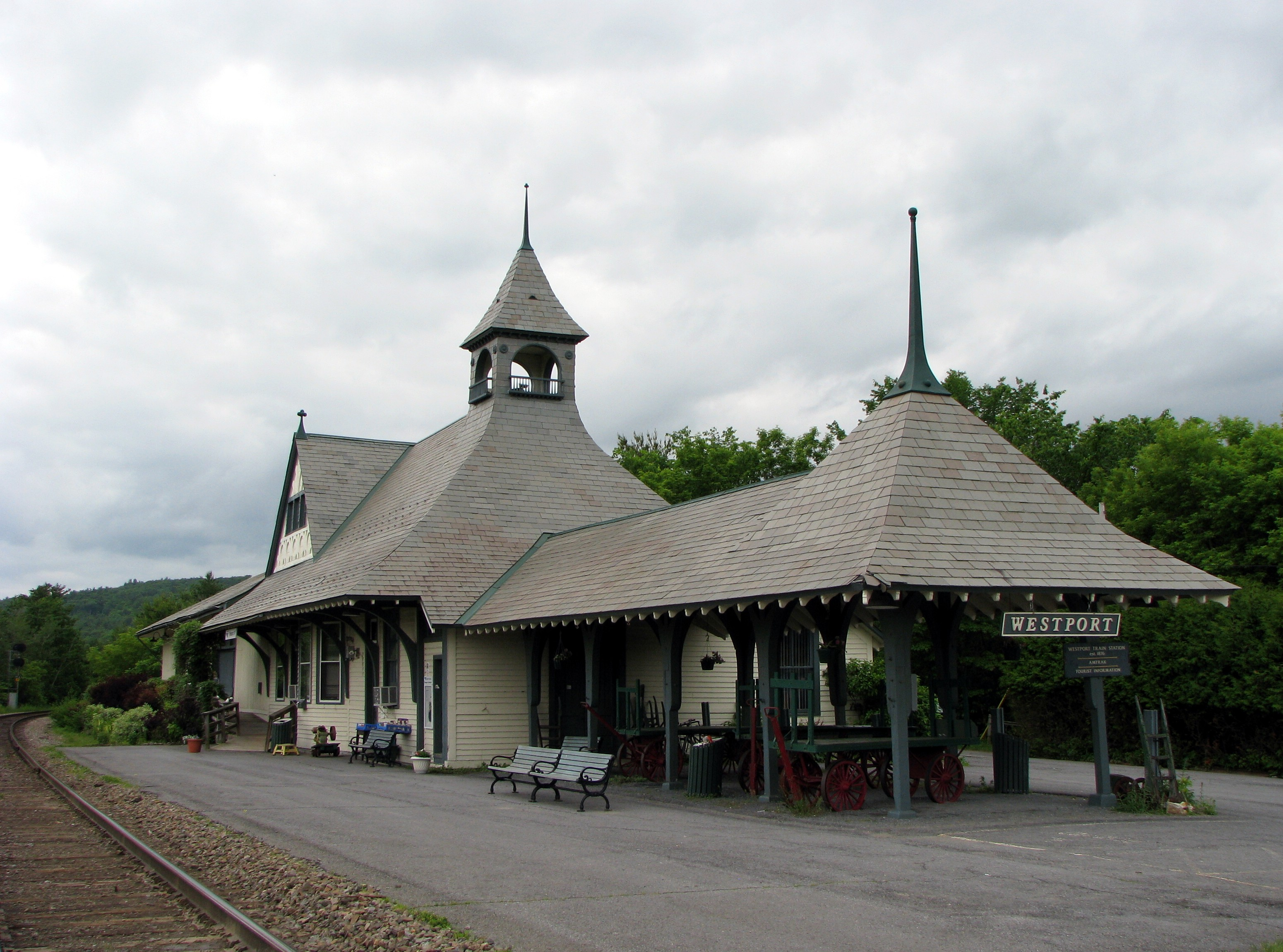
- Platform side of the old Westport D&H station in 2009

General information
- Location: 6705 Main Street (Route 9N); Westport, New York; United States
- Coordinates: 44.1871°N 73.4519°W
- Owner: Town of Westport
- Line: Canadian Subdivision
- Platforms: 1 side platform
- Tracks: 1
- Connections: Amtrak Thruway

Construction
- Accessible: Yes

Other information
- Station code: Amtrak: WSP

History
- Opened: 1876
- Rebuilt: 1891, 1908 (expansion); 1974–1976, 1998 (restoration)

Passengers
- FY 2025: 3,625 (Amtrak)

Services
Preceding station	Amtrak	Following station
Plattsburgh toward Montreal	Adirondack	Port Henry toward New York
Former services
Preceding station	Amtrak	Following station
Willsboro toward Montreal	Adirondack Discontinued 1987	Port Henry toward New York
Preceding station	Delaware and Hudson Railway	Following station
Merriams toward Rouses Point	Main Line	Port Henry toward Albany
Location

Westport station is an Amtrak intercity train station in Westport, New York. It was originally built by the Delaware and Hudson Railroad in 1876, and was expanded twice; the first time being in 1891, and the second time being in 1908. The station houses the Depot Theatre, a professional summer theatre, which was established in 1979. Westport serves the Adirondack as well as Amtrak Thruway buses to Lake Placid, New York.

In 1974, the D&H sold the depot to the town of Westport for $1. Two years later, the Westport Historical Society initiated a major restoration with a particular focus on the lobby. A subsequent renovation began in 1998; the original slate roof was replaced, repairs were made to the ornamental fascia and accessible-compliant bathrooms were installed. The majority of the funding came from an Intermodal Surface Transportation Efficiency Act (ISTEA) grant, with additional money from the New York State Council on the Arts, the Great American Stations Foundation and the theater group.

The station has one low-level side platform on the west side of the track. A 120-foot (37 m)-long accessible platform with a wheelchair lift was completed in 2024.
