= Port Henry station =

Railroad station in Port Henry, New York

Port Henry, NY
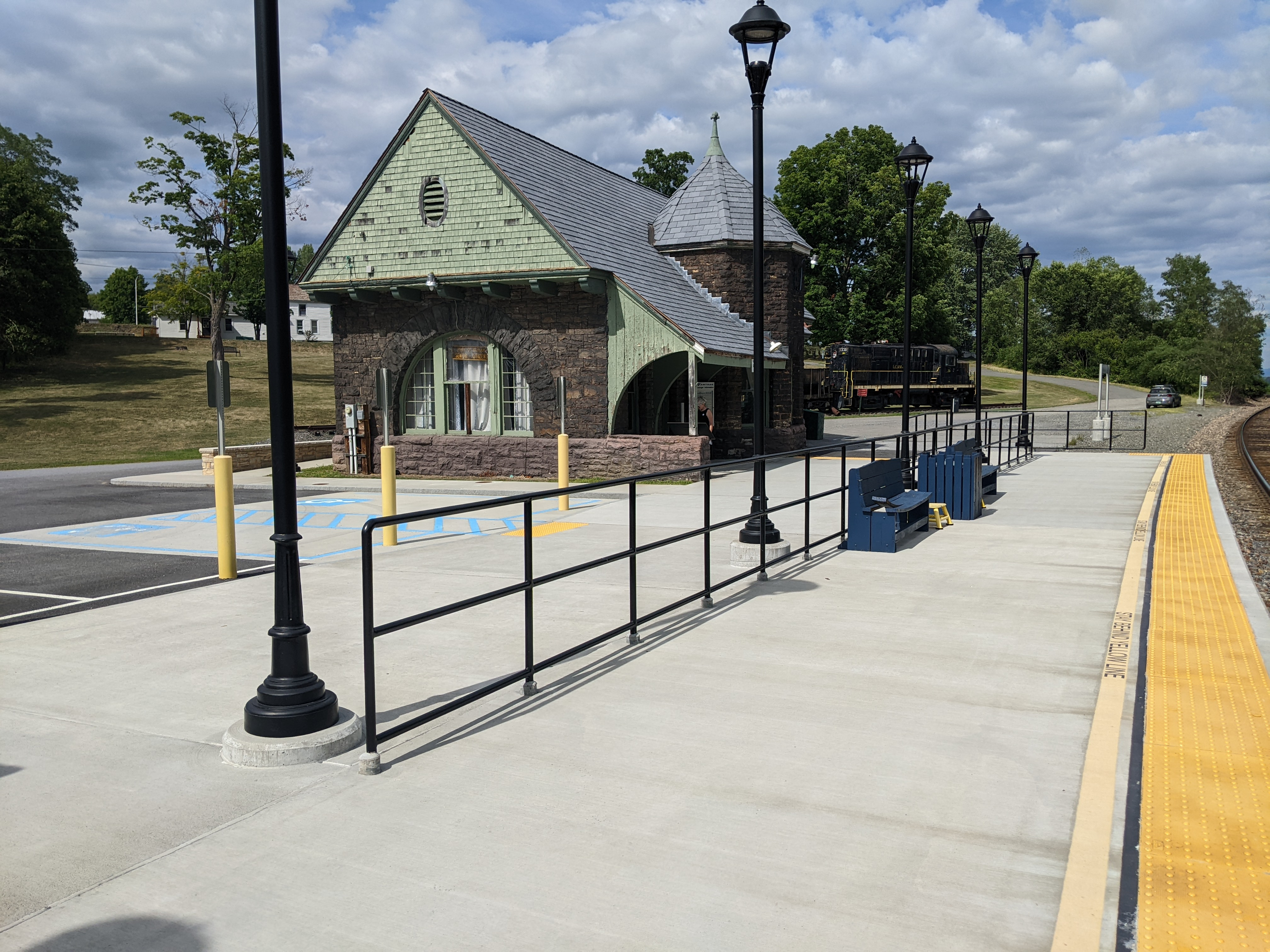
- Port Henry station in July 2022

General information
- Location: 20 Park Place; Port Henry, New York; United States
- Coordinates: 44°2′33″N 73°27′31″W
- Owner: Delaware and Hudson Railway
- Line: Canadian Subdivision
- Platforms: 1 side platform
- Tracks: 1

Construction
- Accessible: Yes

Other information
- Station code: Amtrak: POH

History
- Opened: 1888

Passengers
- FY 2025: 1,026 (Amtrak)

Services
Preceding station	Amtrak	Following station
Westport toward Montreal	Adirondack	Ticonderoga toward New York
Former services
Preceding station	Delaware and Hudson Railway	Following station
Westport toward Rouses Point	Main Line	Crown Point toward Albany
- Delaware & Hudson Railroad Depot
- U.S. National Register of Historic Places
- Area: less than one acre
- Architect: Fuller & Wheeler
- Architectural style: Romanesque
- MPS: Moriah MPS
- NRHP reference No.: 95000593
- Added to NRHP: June 1, 1995
Location

Port Henry station is an Amtrak intercity train station in Port Henry, New York served by the Adirondack. The station has one low-level side platform on the west side of the track.

The station building, designed by architects Fuller & Wheeler, was built in 1888 by the Delaware and Hudson Railroad. It was listed on the National Register of Historic Places on June 1, 1995, as the Delaware & Hudson Railroad Depot. The station building currently serves as a local senior citizen's and community center. A Canadian Pacific Alco ore car and a Lake Champlain and Moriah Railroad caboose are on display near the station.

== See also ==
- National Register of Historic Places listings in Essex County, New York
