= Plattsburgh station =

Train station in New York State

Plattsburgh, NY
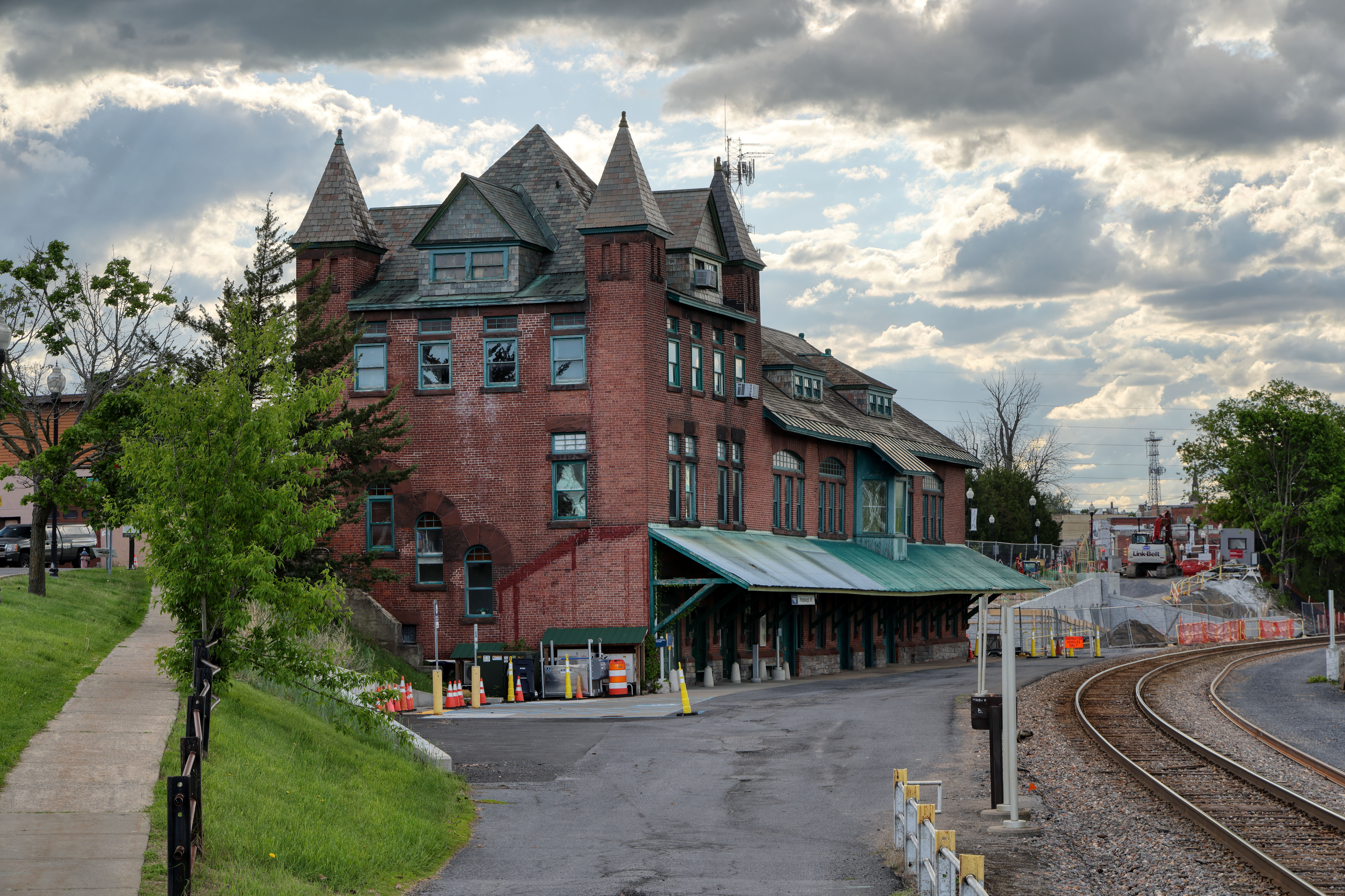
- Plattsburgh train station

General information
- Location: 121 Bridge Street; Plattsburgh, New York; United States
- Coordinates: 44.69670°N 73.44647°W
- Owner: Plattsburgh Depot Partnership
- Line: Canadian Subdivision
- Platforms: 1 side platform
- Tracks: 1

Construction
- Accessible: Yes

Other information
- Station code: Amtrak: PLB

History
- Opened: 1886

Passengers
- FY 2025: 10,744 (Amtrak)

Services
Preceding station	Amtrak	Following station
Rouses Point toward Montreal	Adirondack	Westport toward New York
Former services
Preceding station	Delaware and Hudson Railway	Following station
West Chazy toward Rouses Point	Main Line	Cliff Haven toward Albany
Preceding station	Amtrak	Following station
Rouses Point toward Montreal	Adirondack	Port Kent Suspended 2020 toward New York
- D & H Railroad Complex
- U.S. National Register of Historic Places
- Area: 18 acres (7.3 ha)
- Architect: Fuller & Wheeler
- Architectural style: Late Victorian
- MPS: Plattsburgh City MRA
- NRHP reference No.: 82001102
- Added to NRHP: November 12, 1982
Location

Plattsburgh station is an Amtrak intercity train station in Plattsburgh, New York. The station is served by one daily round trip on the Adirondack. It has one low-level side platform on the west side of the single track of the Canadian Pacific Railway Canadian Subdivision.

The Plattsburgh station was opened in 1886, previously used as a Delaware and Hudson Railway Depot, and was designed by Albany architects Fuller & Wheeler, in the French Provincial style. It was listed on the National Register of Historic Places on November 12, 1982 as the D & H Railroad Complex. Currently Amtrak only uses a small office downstairs at track level while the above space holds law offices, a media production business, and financial investment offices.

The station has no intercity bus connections. Greyhound Lines and Trailways of New York stop near the U.S. Route 9 / Interstate 87 interchange north of Plattsburgh, 2.5 miles (4.0 km) from the station.

== See also ==
- National Register of Historic Places in Clinton County, New York
