= Po =

Po or PO may refer to:

== Arts and entertainment ==
=== Fictional characters ===
- Po (Kung Fu Panda), the protagonist of the Kung Fu Panda franchise
- Po, one of the titular Teletubbies
- Po, a character in the novel Graceling by Kristin Cashore

=== Music ===
- Po (instrument), a percussion instrument
- Pocket Operator, a series of drum machines and synthesizers by Teenage Engineering
- Po!, a British musical group

=== Other media ===
- Po: Beyond Yes and No, a 1973 book by Edward de Bono
- Po, the former name of the 2016 film A Boy Called Po

== Businesses and organisations ==
- Compagnie du chemin de fer de Paris à Orléans, a defunct major French railway company, a forerunner of SNCF
- Petrol Ofisi, a petroleum distribution company
- Pilkington Optronics, a multinational optronics manufacturer
- Polar Air Cargo (IATA code), an airline
- Platforma Obywatelska (Civic Platform), a Polish political party
- Post office, a customer service facility forming part of a national postal system
- Pensions Ombudsman, the official ombudsman institution for investigating complaints regarding pensions in the UK
- PhysicsOverflow, a post-publication open peer review platform and question & answer forum

== Economics ==
- Purchase order, a document issued from a buyer to a seller
- Postal order, a financial instrument for sending money by mail
- Pareto optimality, a concept in economics
- Principal Only, a type of collateralized mortgage obligation

== Job titles and ranks ==
- Petty officer, a non-commissioned naval rank
- Pilot officer, a commissioned air force rank
- Prison officer, whose job is to guard and look over inmates in a correctional facility
- Probation officer or parole officer

== Language ==
- Po language, or Bo language, of New Guinea
- Po (kana), in syllabic Japanese script

== People ==
- Po Beg, 8th-century Turkic female ruler
- Po Bronson, American journalist and writer
- Poh Ling Yeow (born 1973), Malaysian-born Australian cook, artist, actress, author and television presenter
- Fernão do Pó, 15th-century Portuguese explorer
- Kimberly Po (born 1971), US tennis player
- Teresa del Po (1649–1716), Italian painter
- P.O, stage name of Pyo Ji-hoon, South Korean rapper and member of the boy group Block B

== Places ==
=== Europe ===
- Po (river), in Italy
- Pô (department), a department of the First French Empire in present Italy
- PO postcode area, a group of UK postal districts around Portsmouth, England
- Poo (Cabrales) (Asturian: Po), a municipality in Asturias, Spain

=== Other places ===
- Pô Department (Burkina Faso), a department and commune in Burkina Faso
  - Pô, the village in this departement
- Po, Chiang Rai, a village in Thailand
- A river in Virginia, US; joins the Mat, the Ta, and the Ni Rivers to form the Mattaponi River

== Science, technology, and mathematics ==
=== Computing ===
- .po, a filename extension
- Petaoctet (Po), a unit of information storage
- Product owner, a role in Scrum, a software development strategy

=== Other uses in science, technology, and mathematics ===
- Polonium, symbol Po, a chemical element
- Propylene oxide, an organic compound
- Phosphorus monoxide (PO), an unstable radical inorganic compound
- Projective orthogonal group, an action in projective geometry and linear algebra
- Per os or peroral, meaning "by mouth", i.e. oral administration of a medication

== Sports ==
- Pickleball Ontario, Canadian provincial pickleball association
- Putout, in baseball statistics

== Other uses ==
- Po (clothing), a traditional Korean overcoat
- Po (food), dried meat and fish in Korean cuisine
- Po (lateral thinking), part of a lateral thinking technique created by Edward de Bono
- Po (giant panda), daughter of Yang Yang, a giant panda at Zoo Atlanta
- Po (spirit), one of the elements of the spirit in ancient Chinese religion
- Po, a Filipino honorific expressing politeness and respect
- Patrouilleurs Océanique, a program of the French Navy
- Chamber pot, in British slang

== See also ==
- Poh (disambiguation)
- P0 (disambiguation) (P zero)
- Poe (disambiguation)
- Portugal
- P.O. box
