= Fort Ticonderoga Ferry =

Cable ferry in New York State

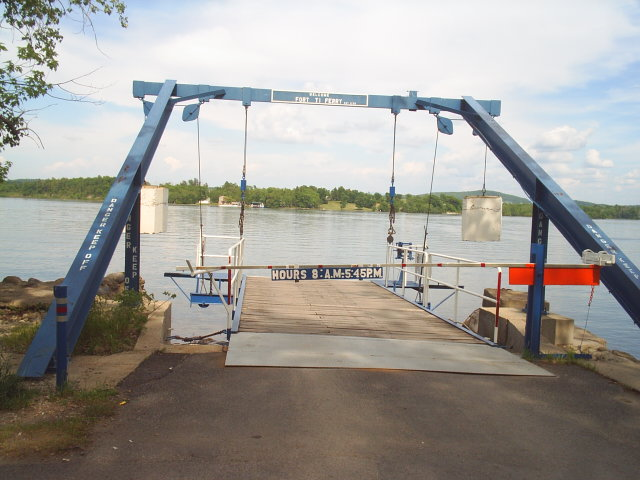
- Locale: Shoreham, Vermont/Ticonderoga, New York
- Waterway: Lake Champlain
- Transit type: Vehicle and passenger cable ferry
- Owner: Jack Doyle
- Began operation: 1823; 203 years ago
- No. of lines: 1
- No. of vessels: 1
- No. of terminals: 2
- Website: https://www.forttiferry.com/

The Fort Ticonderoga Ferry is a cable ferry crossing Lake Champlain between Ticonderoga, New York, and Shoreham, Vermont. It connects the New York and Vermont segments of State Route 74 The ferry can carry up to 18 cars and has a weight limit of 15 tons. The ferry operates seasonally, from May to October. The crossing takes seven minutes, and there are three crossings every hour. Cars are charged $12 one way, or $20 for a round trip. The ferry has been regularly operating in some form since 1759, but regular operation only began in 1823. The ferry uses a cable system consisting of two 1.1-inch (2.8 cm) steel cables aligned in parallel. The ferry did not operate between 2020 and 2022 due to both concerns over the COVID-19 pandemic, and litigation between the ex-owner and the current owner.
