= Peace on Earth =

Peace on Earth may refer to:

- "Peace on Earth, good will to men", a phrase from the Biblical annunciation to the shepherds
- World peace

== Music ==
=== Albums ===
- Peace on Earth (Casting Crowns album), 2008
- Peace on Earth (Kitaro album), 1996
- Peace on Earth (Matt Dusk album), 2004
- Peace on Earth (EP), by Crystal Lewis, 2009

=== Songs ===
- "Peace on Earth" (U2 song), 2000
- "Peace on Earth/Little Drummer Boy", by David Bowie and Bing Crosby, 1982
- "Peace on Earth", by Big Daddy Weave from Christ Is Come, 2009
- "Peace on Earth", by Keke Wyatt from Who Knew?, 2010
- "Peace on Earth", by Mike Oldfield from The Millennium Bell, 1999

== Other media ==
- Peace on Earth (film), a 1939 cartoon short directed by Hugh Harman
- Peace on Earth (Lipchitz), 1969 sculpture in Los Angeles, California, U.S.
- Peace on Earth (novel), a 1987 novel by Stanisław Lem
- Superman: Peace on Earth, a 1998 graphic novel by Paul Dini and Alex Ross

== See also ==
- Pacem in terris, a 1963 papal encyclical issued by Pope John XXIII
