= Purity of Essence =

Purity of Essence, a phrase originating from the film Dr. Strangelove, may refer to:

- Purity of Essence (Hoodoo Gurus album), 2010
- Purity of Essence, an album by Quorthon, 1997
- Purity of Essence, an album by The Rumour, 1980
