= Poe, West Virginia =

- Unincorporated community
- Location within West Virginia Location within the United States
- Coordinates: 38°15′07″N 80°57′57″W
- Country: United States
- State: West Virginia
- County: Nicholas
- Elevation: 1,375 ft (419 m)
- Time zone: UTC-5 (Eastern (EST))
  - Summer (DST): UTC-4 (EDT)
- Area codes: 304 & 681
- GNIS feature ID: 1545085

Poe is an unincorporated community in Nicholas County, West Virginia, United States. Poe is located on West Virginia Route 129, 7 miles (11 km) southwest of Summersville.

The community was named for author Edgar Allan Poe.
