= Union Station (Albany, New York) =

Historic railroad building in New York, US

Albany
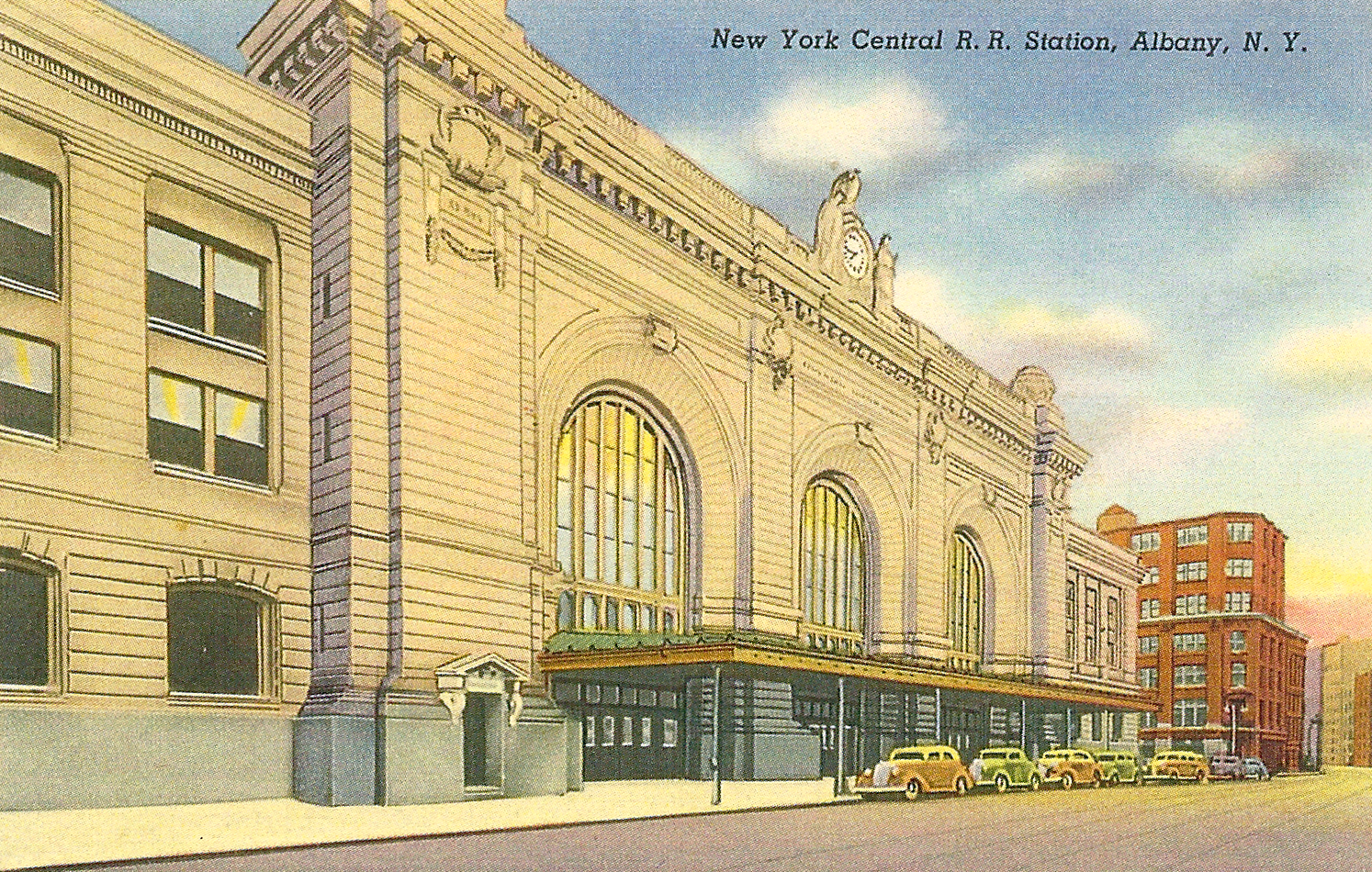
- A postcard of the station from c. 1930

General information
- Location: 575 Broadway, Albany, New York
- Owner: New York Central Railroad
- Line: Hudson Division
- Train operators: New York Central Railroad; Boston and Albany Railroad; Delaware and Hudson Railway; West Shore Railroad

Other information
- Status: Closed

History
- Opened: 1900
- Closed: 1968

Former services
| Preceding station | New York Central Railroad | Following station |
|---|---|---|
| West Albany toward Chicago | Main Line | Rensselaer toward New York |
| Terminus | River Division Albany branch | Selkirk toward Weehawken |
| Terminus | Boston and Albany Railroad Main Line | Rensselaer toward Boston |
| Terminus | Albany – Troy | Troy Terminus |
| Preceding station | Delaware and Hudson Railway | Following station |
| Menands toward Rouses Point | Main Line | Terminus |
| Menands toward Troy | Albany – Troy via Colonie | Terminus |
| Delmar toward Binghamton | Susquehanna Division | Terminus |
| Terminus | Albany – Troy via Rensselaer | Rensselaer toward Troy |
- Albany Union Station
- U.S. National Register of Historic Places
- Location within New York
- Coordinates: 42°39′5″N 73°45′0″W
- Built: 1899–1900
- Architect: Shepley, Rutan & Coolidge; Norcross Bros.
- Architectural style: Beaux Arts
- NRHP reference No.: 71000516
- Added to NRHP: February 18, 1971
Location

Union Station, also known as Albany Union Station, is a building in Albany, New York, on the corner of Broadway and Steuben Street. Built during 1899–1900, it served originally as the city's railroad station but now houses credit union offices. It was listed on the National Register of Historic Places (NRHP) during 1971.

== History ==
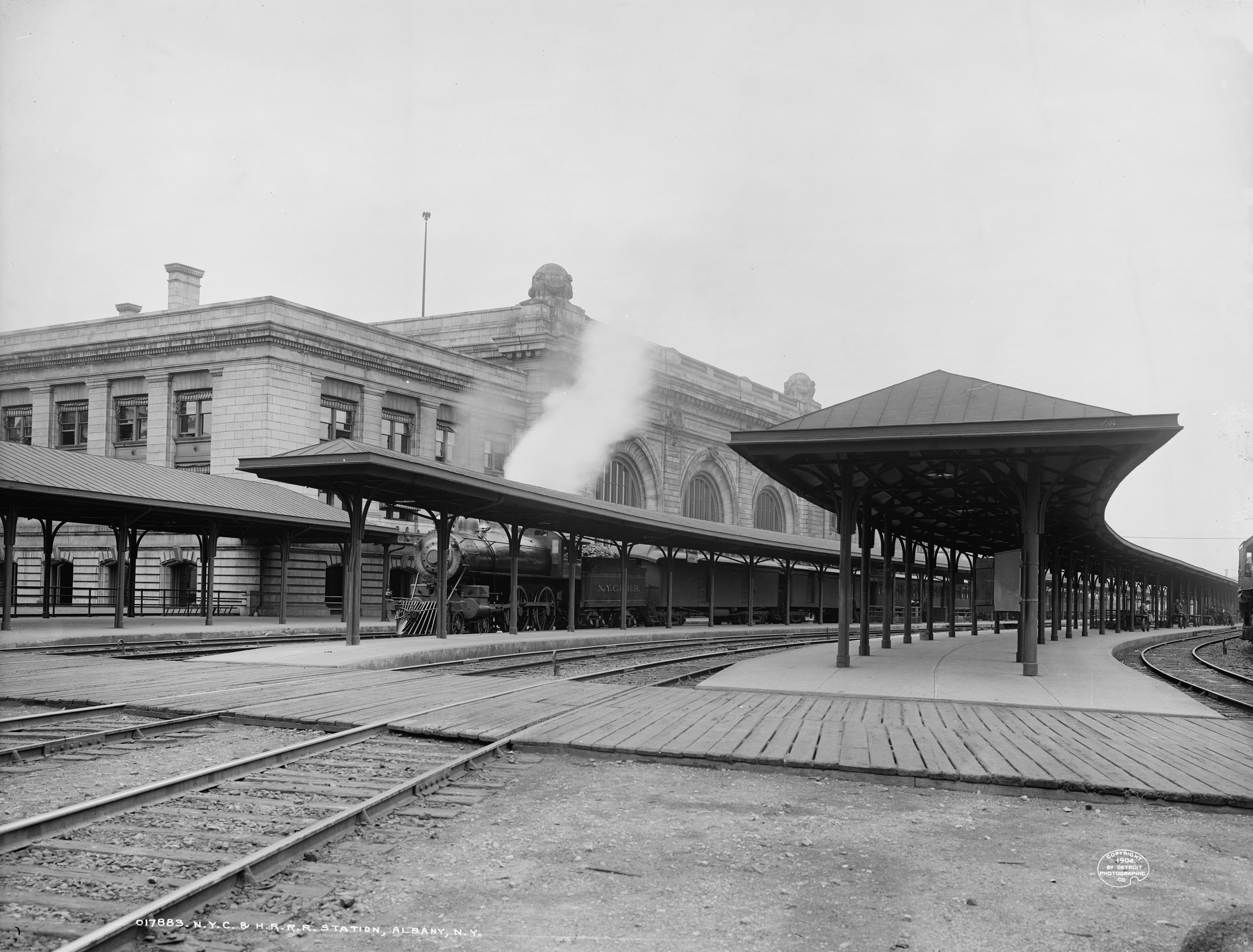
Union Station in 1904

=== Rail service ===
The station received 96 trains per day during 1900 and 121 per day during World War II. It was the Capital District's main railroad station until December 1968. Built primarily to serve the New York Central's passenger trains, it also hosted the services of the Delaware & Hudson. In 1968, Rensselaer Rail Station began operation across the river in Rensselaer, serving the newly merged company Penn Central Railroad, and three years later, Amtrak.

The station was listed on the National Register of Historic Places in 1971.

Its NRHP application asserted:

Perhaps no other building has been so important to the growth of Albany during the twentieth century as Union Station. It was designed in 1899 by Shepley, Rutan & Coolidge, the successors to the firm of H.H. Richardson and the designers of the newly completed South Station in Boston and Union Station in Springfield, Massachusetts. The construction was carried out by Norcross Brothers, who were considered to be one of the finest contractors of the period.

=== Office building ===
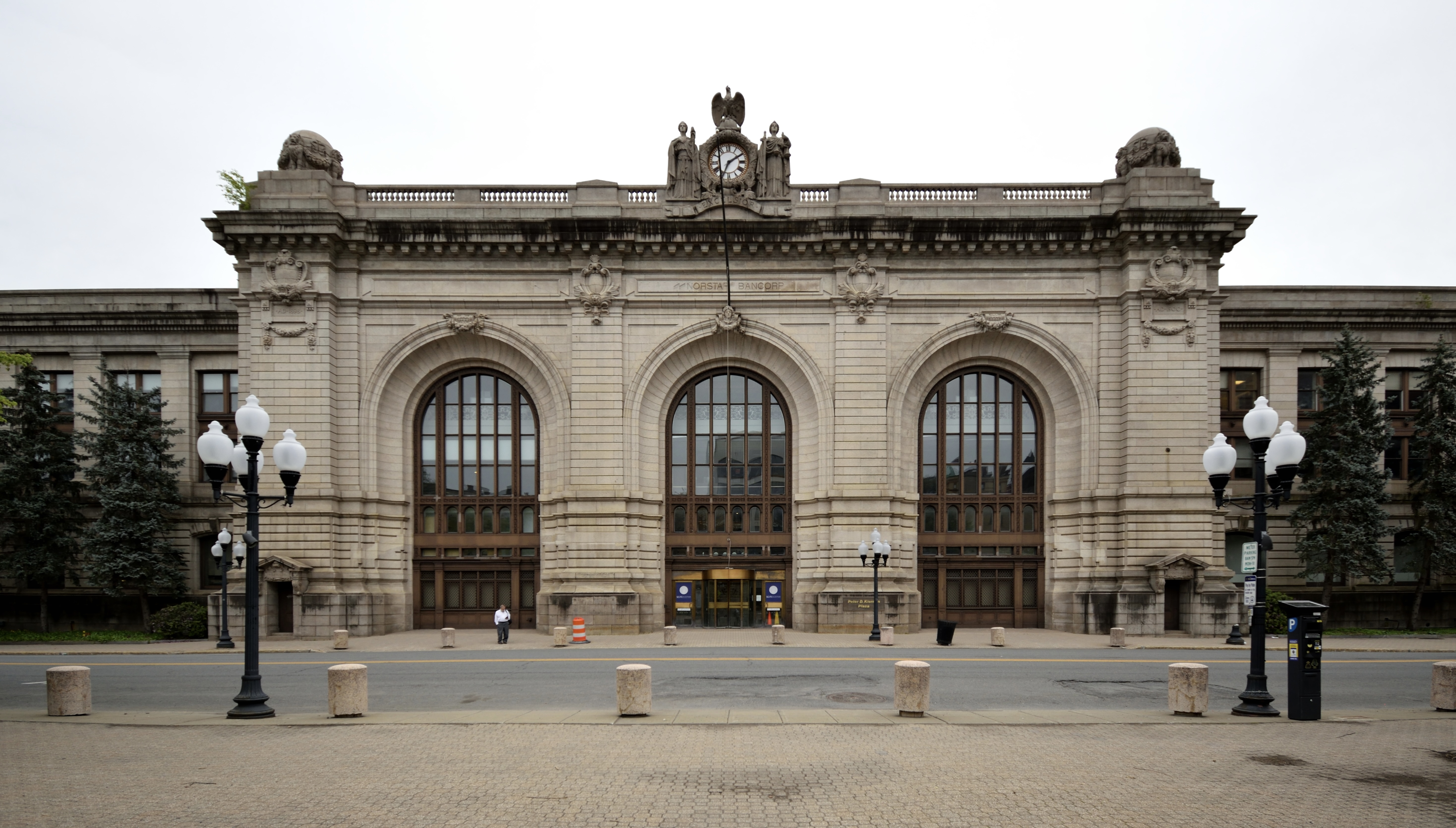
The former Union Station in 2023

During 1986 Peter Kiernan, president of Norstar Bankcorp Inc, relocated the headquarters of the Fortune 500 bank from Guilderland, New York, to Union Station in Albany, and contracted the architecture company EYP Architecture & Engineering to complete a $14.5 million renovation of the historic building. This renovation of Union Station is documented in a book that also details the history of the station. During construction a bottle was discovered hanging on a nail behind a plaster wall ornament; inside was a note dated August 12, 1900. Signed by "AA Johnsen. Foreman," the note mentioned the names of the workers and companies involved in the original construction. It listed the workers' wages as 45 cents per hour. Kiernan then placed a new time capsule regarding this construction behind another plaster ornament on an upper floor. Union Station was renamed Norstar Plaza, and when Norstar Bancorp merged with Fleet Financial Group Inc of Providence, Rhode Island, during 1988, Norstar Plaza became one of two headquarters (with Providence) of the new company. Kiernan died later that year, and during 1989 the corporation renamed the building Peter D. Kiernan Plaza in his honor. At the end of 1999, soon after Fleet purchased BankBoston to become FleetBoston Financial, the new company decided to spend a total of $25 million on new software, hardware, and electrical, heating, and cooling systems for the building.

During 2004 Bank of America bought FleetBoston and kept the building. The next year, the bank sold Kiernan Plaza to American Financial Realty Trust and leased the building back. During 2008 American Financial Realty Trust was bought by Gramercy Realty Corp. and during 2009 October Bank of America decided to consolidate its operations at Kiernan Plaza with others in Albany by relocating them to a State Street building also owned by Gramercy, with no job losses.

In 2013, the building was acquired by Fuller Road Management, a real estate development arm of the College of Nanoscale Science and Engineering, from a subsidiary of Gramercy. The college subsequently opened its Smart Cities Technology Innovation Center (SCiTI) there. The building is also headquarters for the State Employees Federal Credit Union (SEFCU).

== See also ==
- National Register of Historic Places listings in Albany, New York
