= Rouses Point station =

Intercity rail station in New York, US

Rouses Point, NY
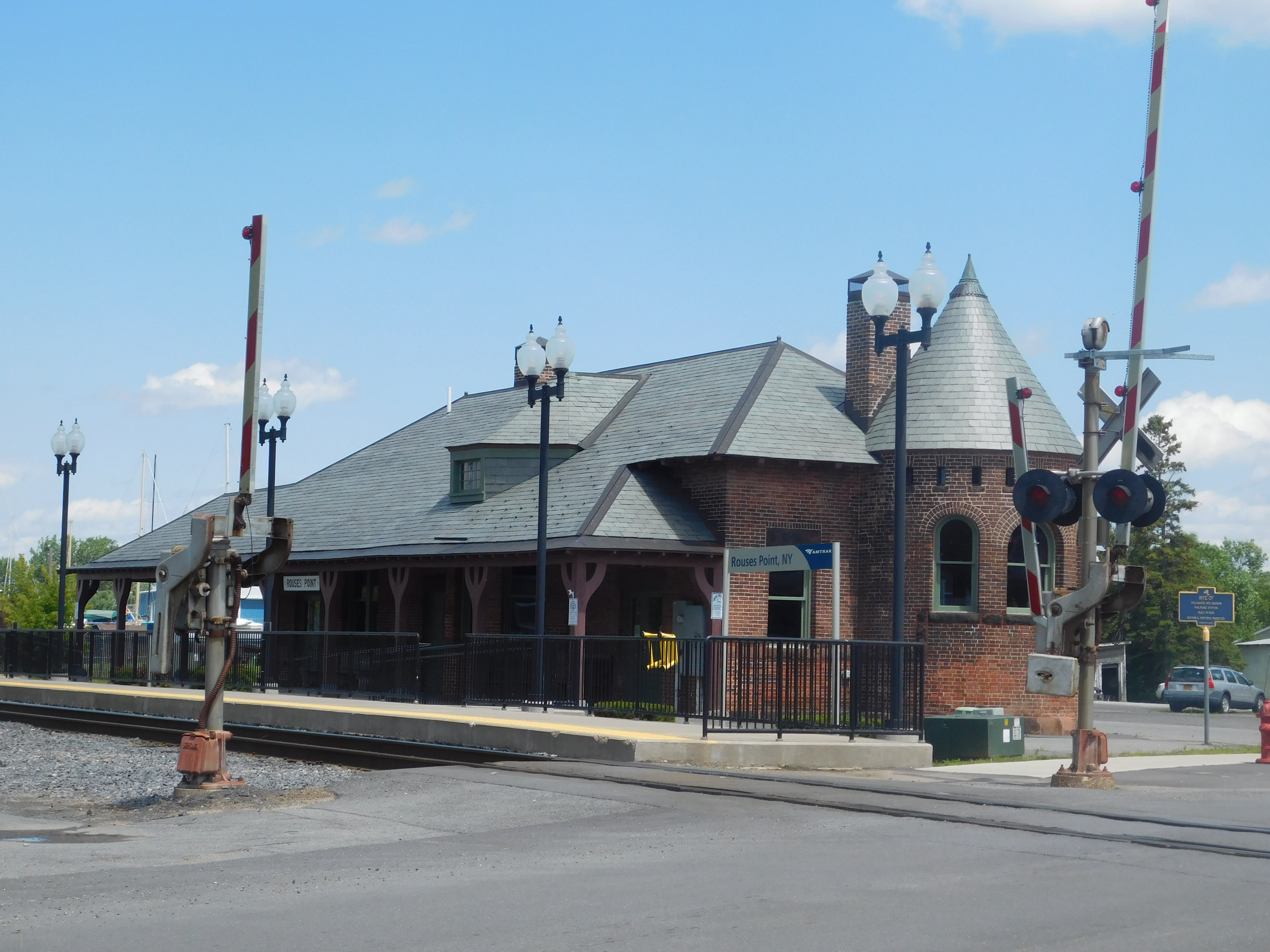
- Rouses Point station in July 2017

General information
- Location: 68 Pratt Street; Rouses Point, New York; United States
- Coordinates: 44.9948°N 73.3712°W
- Owner: Canadian Pacific Railway
- Line: Canadian Subdivision
- Platforms: 1 side platform
- Tracks: 1

Construction
- Parking: Yes
- Accessible: Yes

Other information
- Station code: Amtrak: RSP

History
- Opened: 1889
- Rebuilt: 2014 (renovated)

Services
Preceding station	Amtrak	Following station
Saint-Lambert toward Montreal	Adirondack	Plattsburgh toward New York
Former services
Preceding station	Delaware and Hudson Railway	Following station
Terminus	Main Line	Chazy toward Albany
Preceding station	Napierville Junction Railway	Following station
Lacolle toward Delson	Main Line	Terminus
Preceding station	Amtrak	Following station
Montreal West toward Montreal	Adirondack rerouted 1986	Plattsburgh toward New York
Former services at Rutland Railroad station
Preceding station	Rutland Railroad	Following station
Terminus	Main Line	Alburgh toward North Bennington or Bellows Falls
through to Montreal via Canadian National	Green Mountain Flyer / Mount Royal	Alburgh toward New York or Boston
Champlain toward Ogdensburg	Ogdensburgh–Alburgh	Alburgh Terminus
Preceding station	Canadian National Railway	Following station
Cantic toward Montreal	St. Johns services	Terminus
St. Johns toward Montreal	Green Mountain Flyer / Mount Royal	through to New York or Boston via Rutland RR
- Rouses Point Railroad Station
- U.S. National Register of Historic Places
- Architect: Delaware and Hudson Railroad
- Architectural style: Romanesque
- NRHP reference No.: 04001454
- Added to NRHP: January 5, 2005
Location

Rouses Point station is an Amtrak intercity train station in Rouses Point, New York, served by the single daily round trip of the Adirondack. The station building is a former Delaware and Hudson Railway constructed in 1889, with a one low-level side platform on the east side of the track. It was added to the National Register of Historic Places in 2005 as Rouses Point Railroad Station.

== History ==
The Northern Railroad (later the Ogdensburg and Lake Champlain Railroad) opened between Ogdensburg and Rouses Point in 1850, with a wharf on Lake Champlain at Rouses Point. In 1851, the Champlain and St. Lawrence Railroad was extended south from Canada to a wharf just to the north of the Northern's wharf. That year, the Vermont and Canada Railroad (V&C) began operating a railcar barge from the Northern wharf to Alburgh, Vermont, where its line continued to Burlington. It soon gained control of the Ogdensburg and Lake Champlain. Not until 1868 did the line complete its bridge across the lake to Rouses Point.

After several reorganizations, the Ogdensburg and Lake Champlain and the V&C became part of the Central Vermont Railway (CV) in 1873. In 1876, the Delaware and Hudson Railway (D&H) extended its mainline north to Rouses Point, where it connected with the Champlain and St. Lawrence for access to Montreal. The D&H station was located at Pratt Street, just south of the diamond crossing of the CV, which had a separate station at the junction.

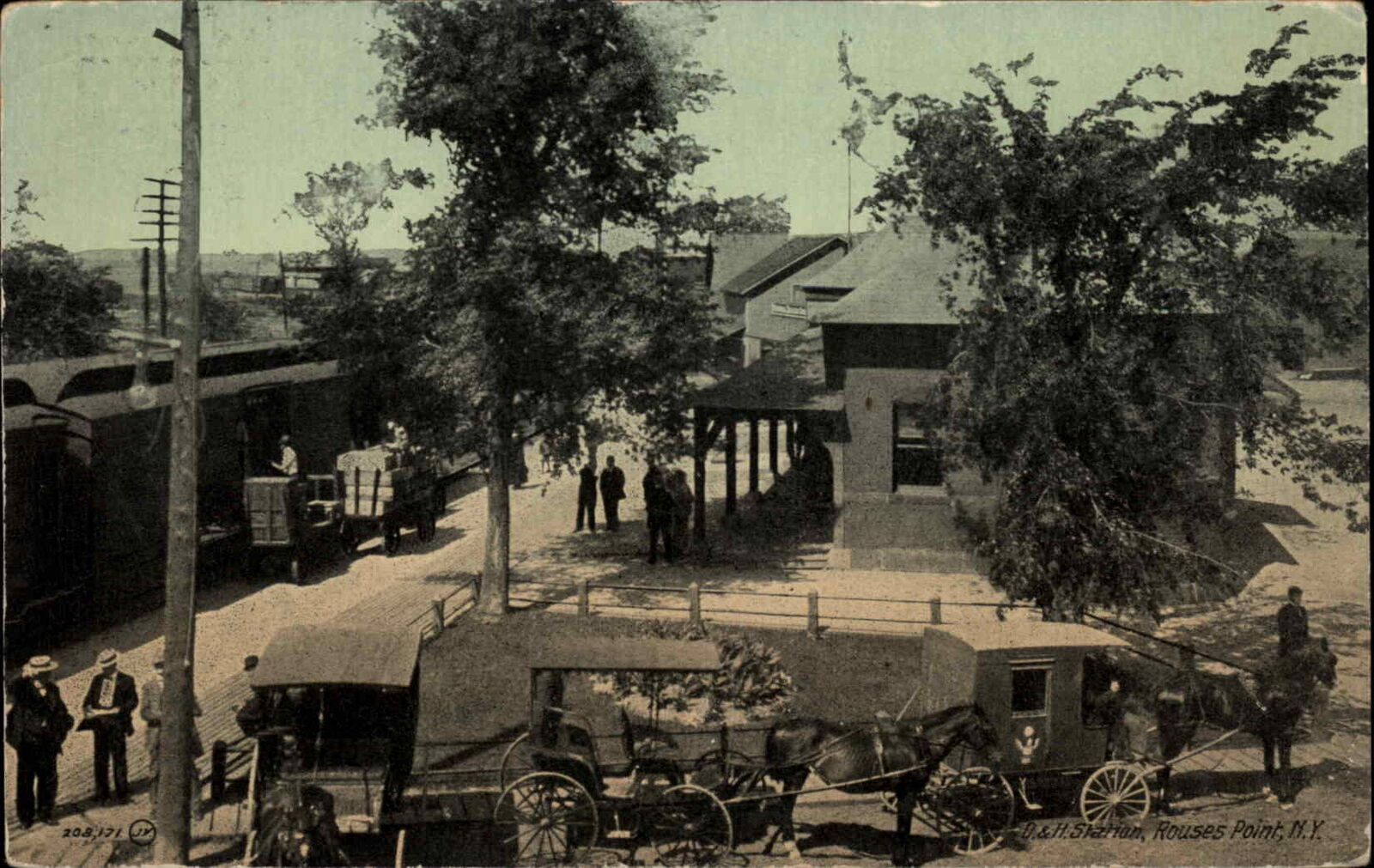
Early 20th century postcard of the station

The Ogdensburg and Lake Champlain became independent again in 1877. In 1883, it constructed the Lamoille Valley Extension eastwards from Rouses Point, with a new drawbridge parallel to the CV bridge. The line connected with the St. Johnsbury and Lamoille County Railroad at Maquam, Vermont. The CV immediately moved to regain control of the Ogdensburg and Lake Champlain, which occurred in June 1884. Service on the extension ended that July, and it was abandoned in 1888.

In 1889, the D&H built a new station in the then-popular Romanesque style. It is a one-story red brick structure with a hipped slate roof and dark stone trim. A round tower with a steep conical roof is at the southern end. The east façade has a Syrian arch door and two similar windows. Around that time, the CV built a new station slightly further east near Pratt Street, which allowed trains to turn north on the line to Montreal.

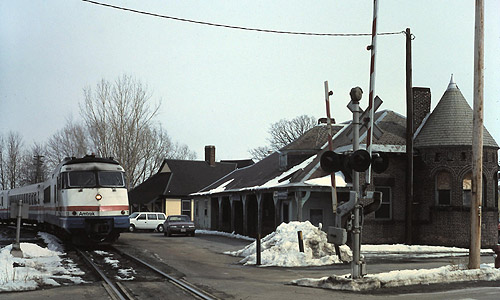
The Adirondack at Rouses Point in 1989

The CV lost control of the Ogdensburg and Lake Champlain during bankruptcy in 1896. In 1901, the Rutland opened its Island Line from Burlington to Rouses Point, using gauntlet tracks to share the CV bridge. That year, the Rutland acquired the Ogdensburg and Lake Champlain. The Napierville Junction Railway opened north from Rouses Point in 1907, giving the D&H a faster route to Montreal. CV passenger service to Rouses Point ended in 1929.

Rutland passenger service to Rouses Point lasted until 1953. The final service was the Mount Royal and an Ogdensburgh–Alburgh mixed train; the Green Mountain Flyer had been cut back to Burlington in 1951. D&H passenger service continued until April 30, 1971. Amtrak, which took over intercity passenger service in May 1971, resumed service on the D&H with the Adirondack in 1974. Amtrak initially used the D&H station, but later switched to a former express office just to the north.

In 2002, the D&H sold the station to the Village of Rouses Point for $5,000. It was added to the National Register of Historic Places on January 5, 2005. An accessible platform was built in 2010. A rehabilitation project was completed in 2014, allowing the station building to serve as Rouses Point History and Welcome Center.
